= Midtown Square Mall (North Carolina) =

Defunct mall in Charlotte, North Carolina, U.S.

Midtown Square
- Location: Charlotte, North Carolina, United States
- Coordinates: 35°12′45″N 80°50′06″W
- Address: Near Independence Blvd & Central Ave
- Opened: October 28, 1959; 67 years ago
- Renovated: 1980; 1989
- Closed: 2000; 26 years ago
- Demolished: September 2005–2006
- Previous names: Charlottetown Mall (1959–1980); Outlet Square (1980–1989)
- Developer: James W. Rouse
- Owner: Pappas Properties
- Floors: 1 (with partial second floor)

Midtown Square, formerly Outlet Square, then Charlottetown Mall, was a shopping mall located in North Carolina. The area's first enclosed shopping mall, it opened on October 28, 1959. Atlanta's Lenox Square opened two months earlier, but it was an open-air mall at first. The mall was situated on a 10-acre (40,000 m^{2}) parcel on the southeastern fringes of Charlotte's "center city" area. The Rouse Company was the mall's developers.

== History ==
=== Stores and design ===
The 234,000-square-foot (21,700 m^{2}) center featured one anchor store: Bon Marché, an Asheville, North Carolina–based department store with no connection to the Seattle-based retailer of the same name. Other major tenants included Colonial Stores supermarket, Rose's five and dime, Eckerd Drug and Milton's, a posh Ivy League haberdasher. The mall was mostly one-story, although the "Central Mall" (middle of the mall) featured a second level with an auditorium and an S&W Cafeteria. The "Central Mall" also featured a fountain, bird cages, and tropical foliage.

=== Logo and advertising ===
Charlottetown Mall had a distinctive crown logo that was on all of its public trash cans and on the door handles at all the entrances/exits. This logo was designed by Dorr M. Depew, owner/operator of Depew Advertising, the Charlotte firm that provided graphic and advertising support for the new mall. Depew also wrote and produced radio commercials for the new mall, using Edwin Franko Goldman's well-known concert march "On The Mall" as the musical background.

=== Decline and closure ===
By 1964, Bon Marché had closed at the mall; their store was quickly replaced by Ivey's. Two other malls which opened in Charlotte – SouthPark Mall and Eastland Mall (in 1970 and 1975, respectively) soon grew to draw business away from Charlottetown Mall, causing the older, smaller mall to decline.

Charlottetown Mall was first renovated in the 1980s, when it was converted into an outlet center (though several traditional stores were retained) and renamed "Outlet Square". Ivey's converted its store to an outlet store before closing altogether. Eventually, the former Ivey's was taken over by Burlington Coat Factory. The mall was renovated a second time in 1989 and renamed "Midtown Square," and two parking garages were added. Unfortunately, neither of the renovations resuscitated the rapidly dying mall. The Colonial Stores was converted to a Big Star Markets, and later to Harris Teeter before closing in 1988.

==== Demolition and redevelopment ====
After several years in a state of being a "dead mall," Midtown Square had closed permanently. The mall and the cinemas, which had also shuttered, were bulldozed back in 2006. Subsequently, a mixed-use complex was constructed on the sites of the old cinema and shopping mall. The retail segment included a two-story anchor store, with the Home Depot Design Center occupying the first floor and Target on the second. Additionally, the complex featured 198,000 square feet (18,581 square meters) of additional retail space, along with condominiums, offices, and restaurants.

The project had been developed through a joint venture by Charlotte-based Pappas Properties / Collette Associates and Birmingham-based Colonial Properties Trust. It opened in early 2008.
