= SouthPark Mall (North Carolina) =

Shopping mall in North Carolina, U.S.

Coordinates: 35.1524°N 80.8326°W

SouthPark

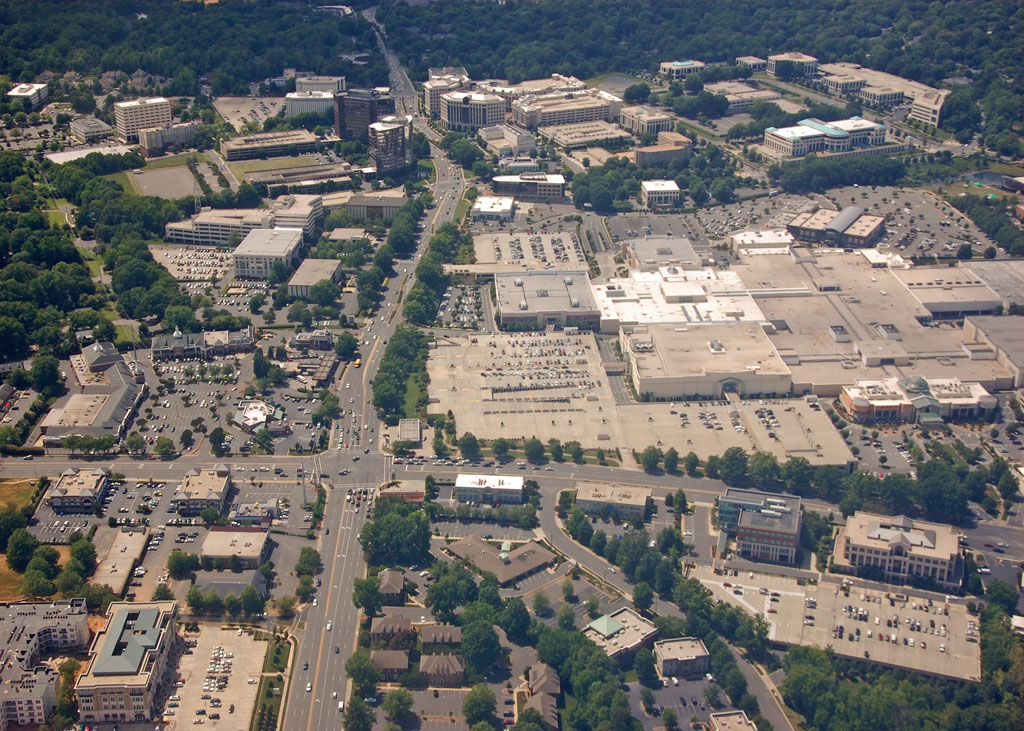
- The SouthPark Mall aerial view
- Location: 4400 Sharon Road, Charlotte, North Carolina, United States
- Opened: February 12, 1970; 56 years ago
- Developer: Belk, Ivey's
- Manager: Simon Property Group
- Owner: Simon Property Group
- Architect: Suratt
- Num. of stores: 177
- Num. of anchor tenants: 6
- Floor area: 1,688,480 square feet (156,865 m^{2}) (GLA)
- Floors: 1 with partial lower level (2 in Dick's Sporting Goods, Macy's, Neiman Marcus, and Nordstrom, 3 in Dillard's and all Parking Garages, 4 in Belk)
- Public transit: SouthPark Transit Center
- Website: www.simon.com/mall/southpark

SouthPark is an shopping mall in the SouthPark neighborhood in Charlotte, North Carolina. The mall is located approximately five miles (8 km) south of Uptown Charlotte, at the corner of Sharon and Fairview Roads, and adjacent to Phillips Place, also owned by Simon Property Group. With 1,688,480 square feet (160,000 m^{2}), It is the largest mall in the Carolinas, the 10th largest on the East Coast and is the 28th largest in the United States. SouthPark is the most congested shopping area in the United States during Black Friday weekend. The mall is among the most profitable malls in the United States with sales at over $1,500 per square foot and is visited by more than 12 million visitors a year.

SouthPark Mall is also the home of the SouthPark Community Transit Center, which opened in 2004, which serves the CATS bus lines 19, 29, 30, and 57. The Transit Center is located between Belk and Dillard's.

== History ==
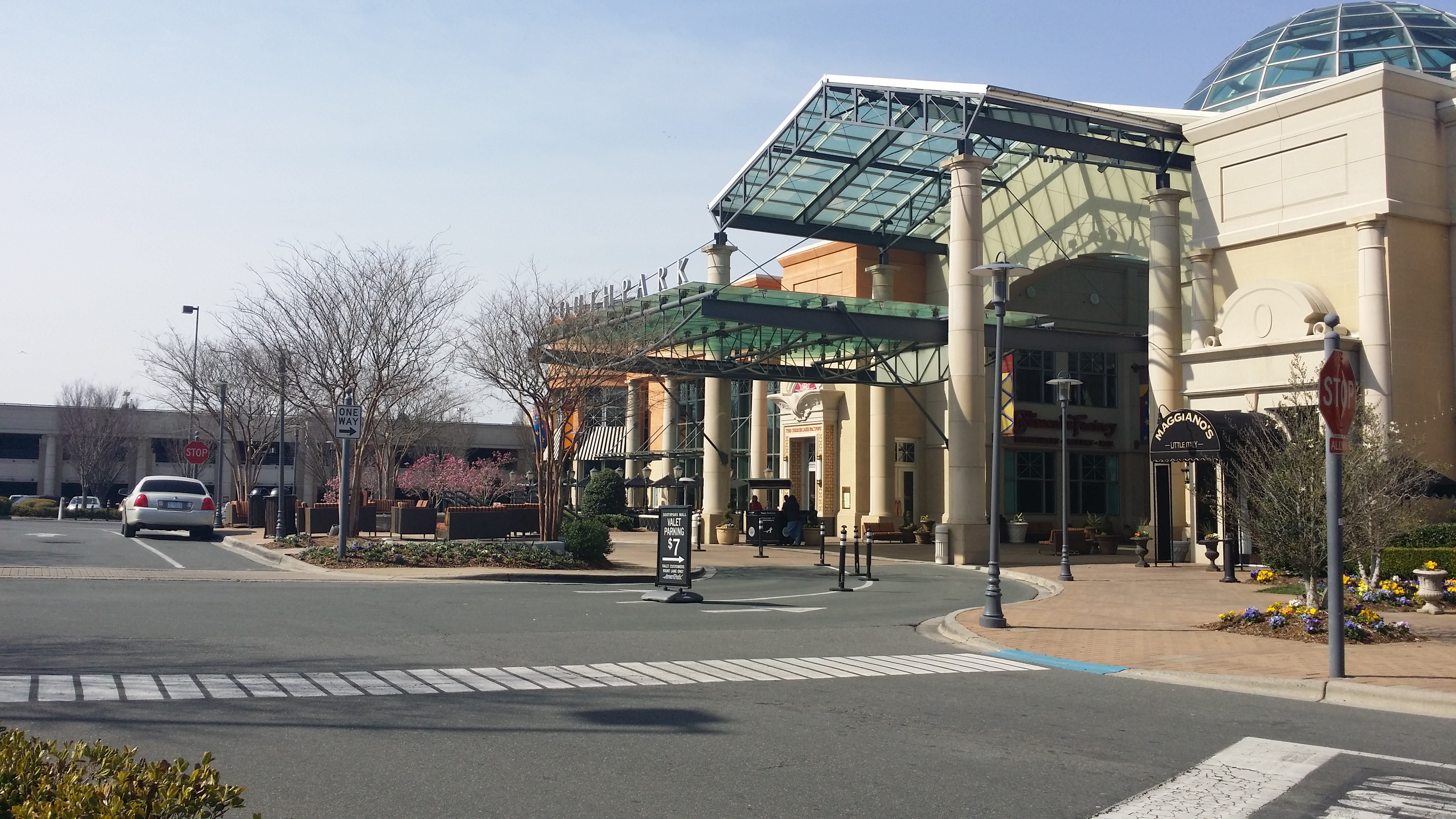
Mall entrance

SouthPark opened on February 12, 1970, with anchor stores Belk, Ivey's, and Sears. The area where SouthPark is today was considered to be on the outskirts of Charlotte at the time it opened. Many people were skeptical about a big shopping mall in the middle of pastureland. The mall was developed by the Belk and Ivey families, owners of the eponymous department stores, who jointly owned and operated the mall, and included a Sears store as a complement due to its focus on housewares. The mall had approximately 1,000,000 square feet (93,000 m^{2}) when it opened, and the design of the shopping mall was starkly modernist, with an underground parking deck, a signature white brick facade, and tinted windows. The inspiration for the mall's original architecture reportedly was Dallas' NorthPark Center. A strip mall opened behind Sears in June 1970 with a Colonial Stores grocery store (later a Big Star food market, then acquired by Harris Teeter in the 1980s) and the SouthPark Cinemas I & II.

The mall did not face any real competition until the two-story Eastland Mall was built about 6 miles (10 km) northeast. Eastland had the same anchor lineup as SouthPark, but also included a JCPenney store and an ice skating rink giving that mall a competitive advantage.

On December 6, 2007 at approximately 12:15 PM EST, a portion of the Nordstrom/Neiman Marcus parking deck collapsed. The collapse of the deck was caused by a car colliding with a retaining wall on the third and highest level. Eyewitness accounts stated an elderly woman may have suffered a heart attack, which triggered the accident; the woman died. Two cars were destroyed by the collapsed section of concrete; no one was in either of the cars. At the time, this was the second American parking structure to collapse in two weeks, leading people to question the structural integrity of such buildings.

In 2011, a study released by TomTom showed that the area around SouthPark Mall is the most congested shopping area in the United States during Black Friday weekend.

=== Expansion ===
In the late 1990s mall owners announced that upscale retailers Saks Fifth Avenue and Nordstrom would join the mall in SouthPark's biggest expansion yet. In 1995, Belk Brothers Co. became the sole owner of SouthPark by purchasing the remaining 50 percent ownership stake from Ivey Properties. The next year, Belk sold the mall to Rodamco, a Dutch real estate investment fund. The mall was briefly managed by Trammell Crow after the sale. Rodamco soon sold the mall to Simon Property Group. In 2001 and 2002, Belk renovated and expanded its flagship store and Hecht's (opened as Thalhimer's as part of an expansion in 1988, became Hecht's in 1992 and Macy's in 2006) renovated and expanded its store in 2003 and 2004. The site of the former convenience center and movie theater has been redeveloped into Symphony Park, an outdoor amphitheater and pond, home of a summer concert series called "Pops in the Park." In the summer of 2003, Sears, citing under performance, closed their store, which was eventually demolished to make way for a new outdoor plaza that included a Joseph-Beth Bookstore and a new Galyan's Store (which opened as a Dick's Sporting Goods as a result of a buyout). Saks Fifth Avenue pulled out of the expansion, and as of 2026 the company still does not have a Charlotte location, but Nordstrom opened its doors in 2004. This luxury expansion brought exclusive and upscale stores to the area, including Burberry, Louis Vuitton, Hermès, and Tiffany & Co. In late 2005, Simon Property Group announced that Neiman Marcus would be the tenant of the former Saks Fifth Avenue anchor pad, along with another wing of stores & boutiques. Neiman Marcus opened in late 2006. Three new parking decks have also been added. Dillard's renovated its original 1970s Ivey's facade and interior, the last anchor to update. Joseph-Beth Booksellers closed its bookstore in 2010 and The Container Store replaced it in August 2011.

Additional high end tenants have been added starting in 2020, including Gucci, Alexander McQueen, Saint Laurent, Golden Goose, Scotch & Soda, Psycho Bunny, and Aritzia, all of which have their sole North Carolina location at the mall. In 2021, it was announced that the West Plaza section of the mall would undergo a renovation, which includes plans to replace the former California Pizza Kitchen with a brewery, an updated playground for children, as well as an open-air stage for live music and other events. In December of 2025, SouthPark added a two-story and 29,000 square foot Zara store. It is currently the only physical location in all of the Carolina's.

== The Village at SouthPark ==
The Village at SouthPark is a 82,000 square-foot, five-story, mixed-use development featuring a curated collection of high-end specialty shops, beauty and wellness services and local eateries located adjacent to the main mall. Crate & Barrel anchors the village and occupies 35,000 square feet. The center also features The Residence at SouthPark, a multi-level apartment building located above the ground floor retail and consists of 150 premier residential units including 32 two-story penthouse units, 4,500 square feet of amenity space, and 225 dedicated parking spaces for residents.

== Symphony Park ==
Symphony Park is an outdoor venue and stage located across from Dick's Sporting Goods. The venue is home to over 80 annual events and attracts thousands of annual visitors. Several concerts have been hosted at the venue, including Kelly Clarkson in 2014.

== List of anchor stores ==
| Name | No. of floors | Year opened | Notes |
|---|---|---|---|
| Belk | 4 | 1970 | Flagship location |
| Dick's Sporting Goods | 2 | 2004 | —N/a |
| Dillard's | 3 | 1990 | Replaced Ivey's |
| Neiman Marcus | 2 | 2006 | —N/a |
| Nordstrom | 2 | 2004 | —N/a |
| Macy's | 2 | 2006 | Replaced Hecht's |

== Gallery ==
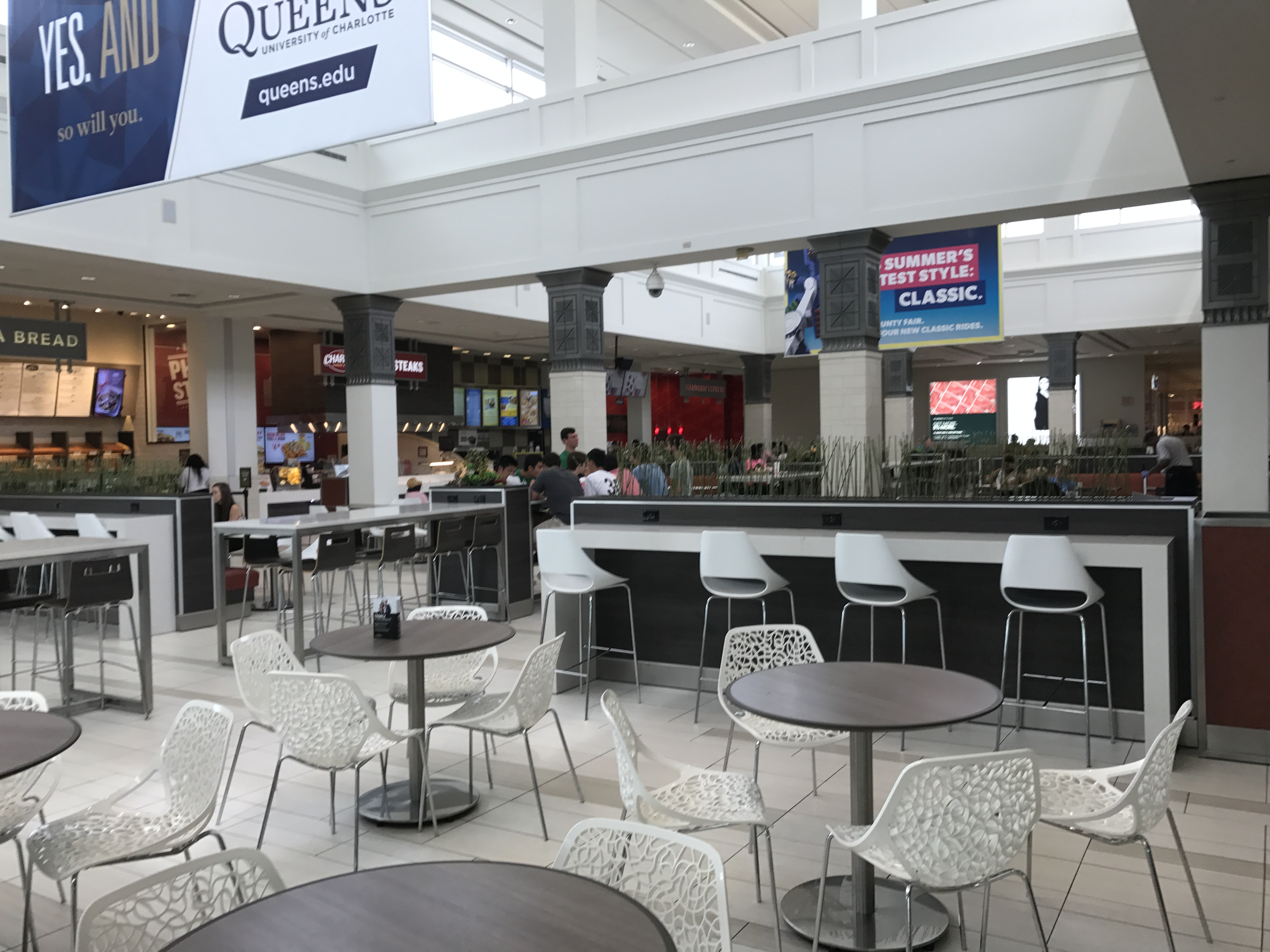
South Park Mall food court

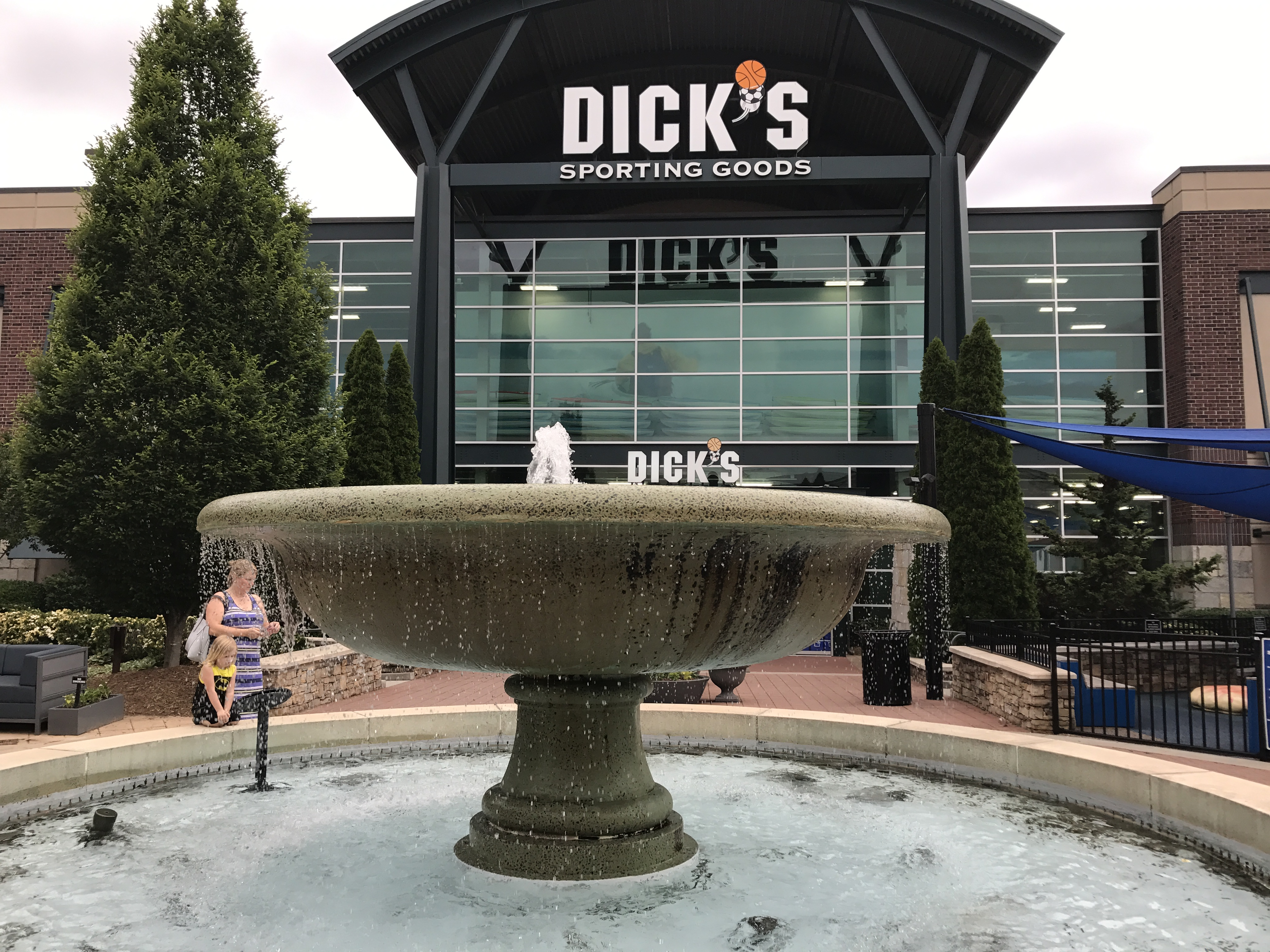
Dick's Sporting Goods store in South Park Mall

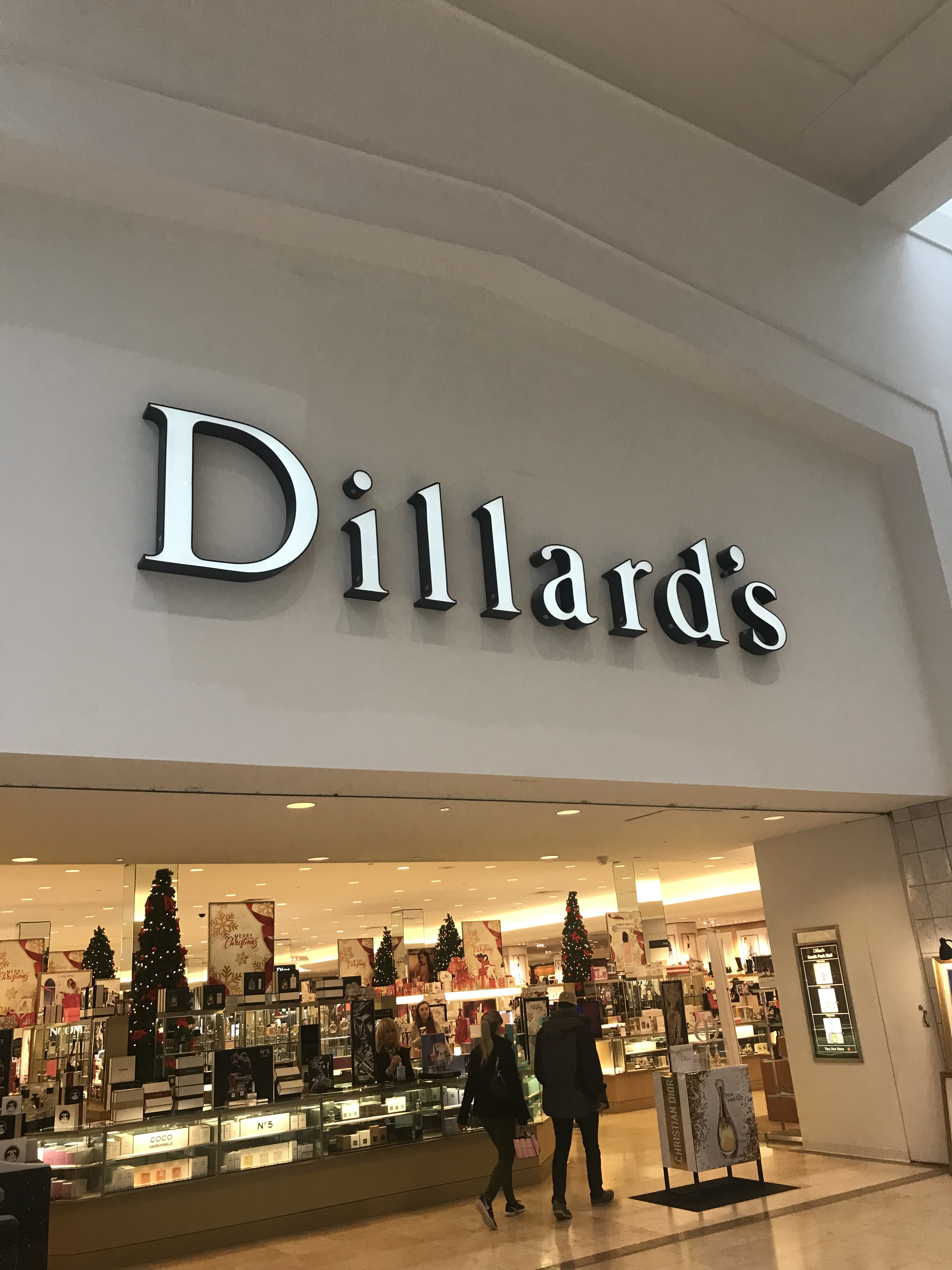
Dillard's store at South Park Mall

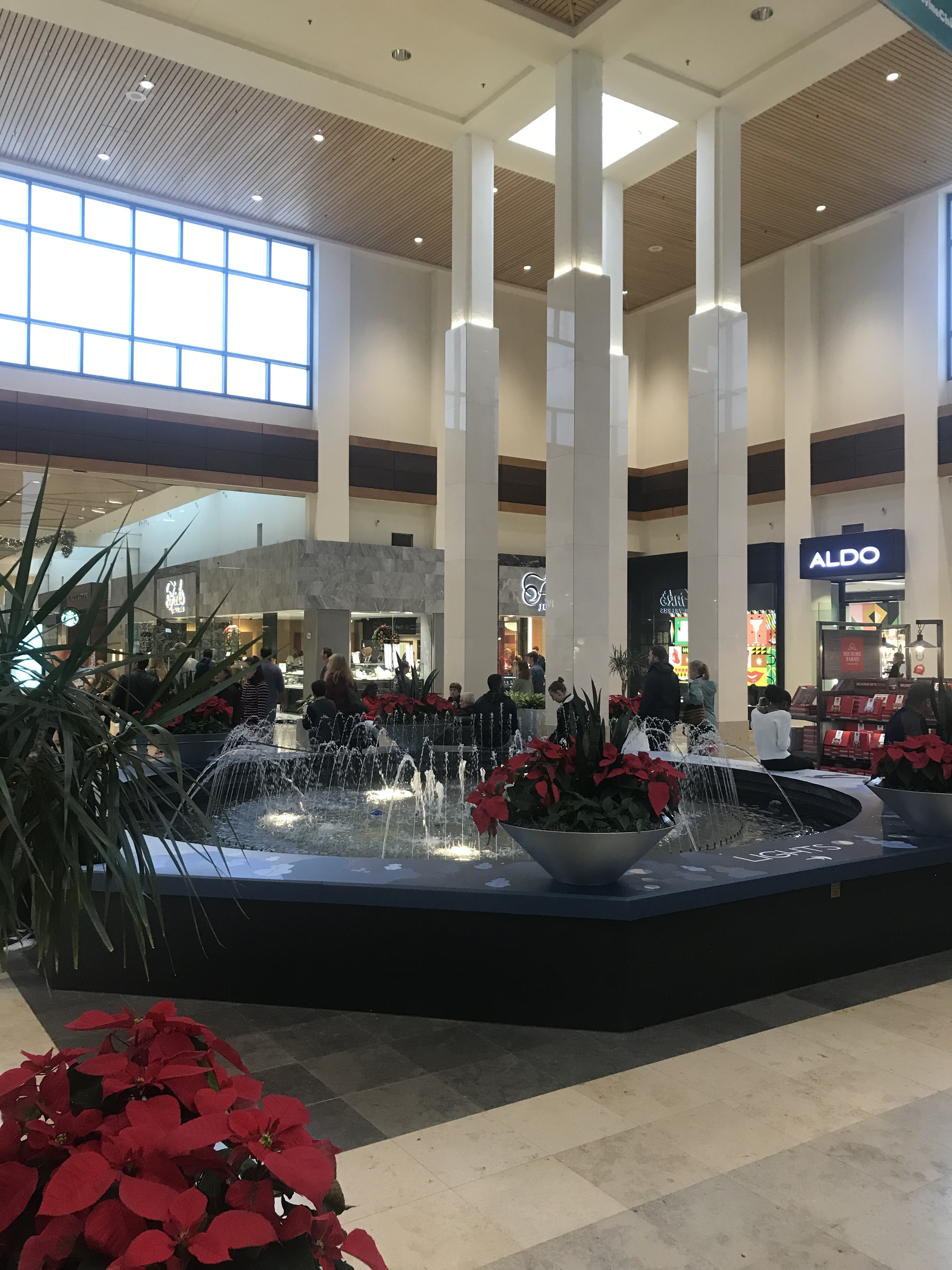
Fountain at South Park Mall

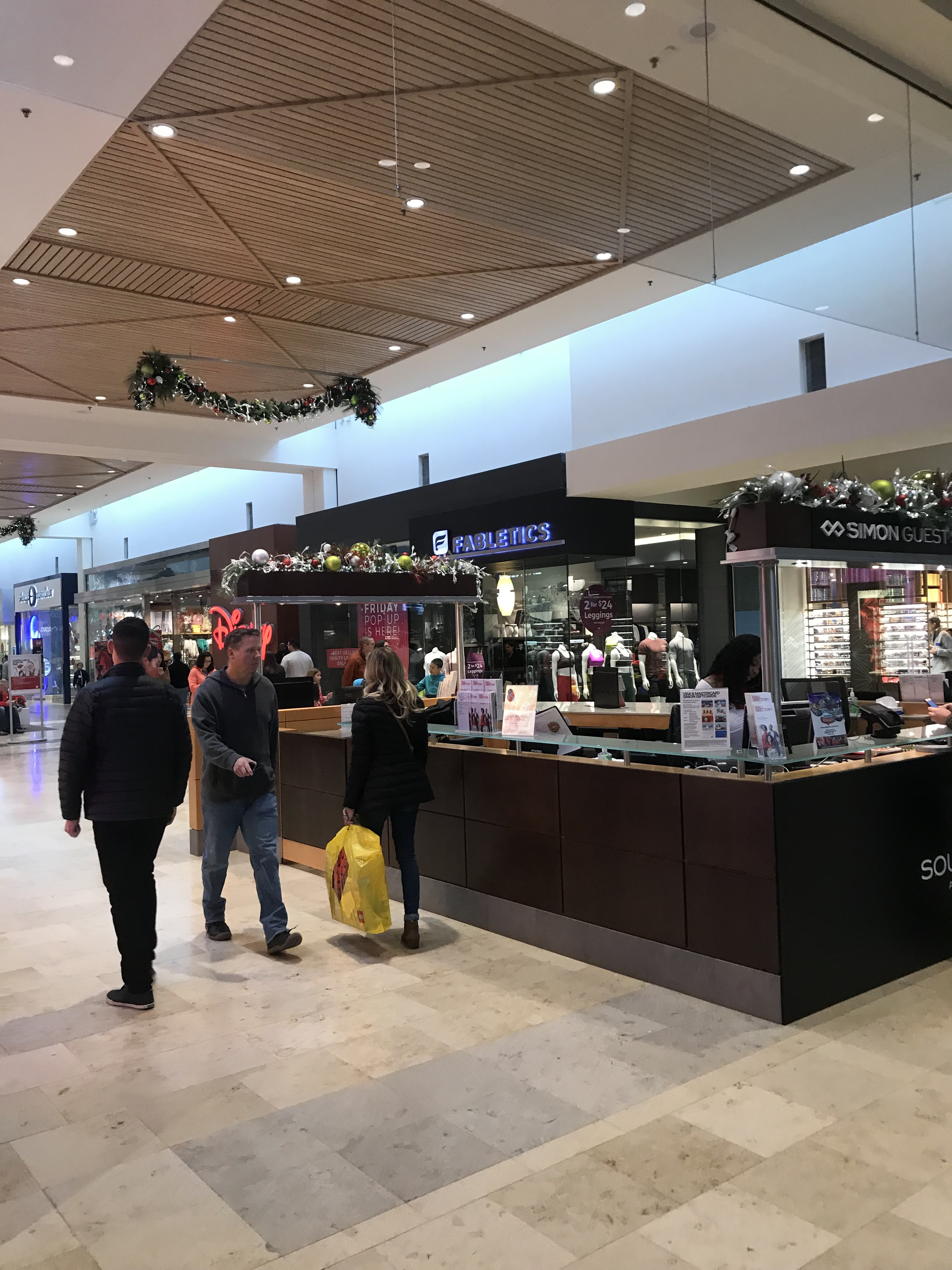
Interior of South Park Mall

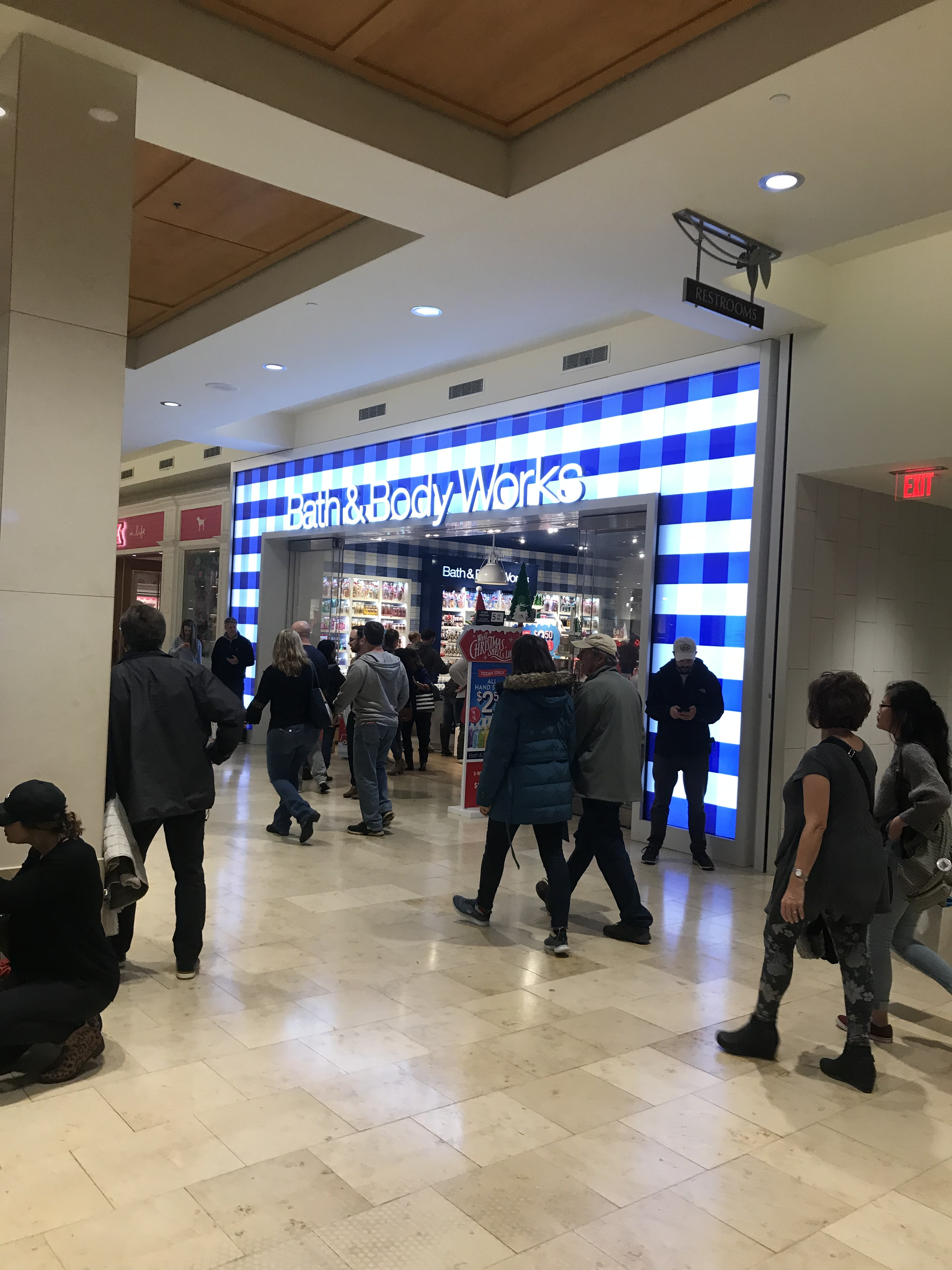
Interior of South Park Mall
