= SouthPark, Charlotte =

Edge city in Charlotte, North Carolina, US

SouthPark
- Edge city / Neighborhood
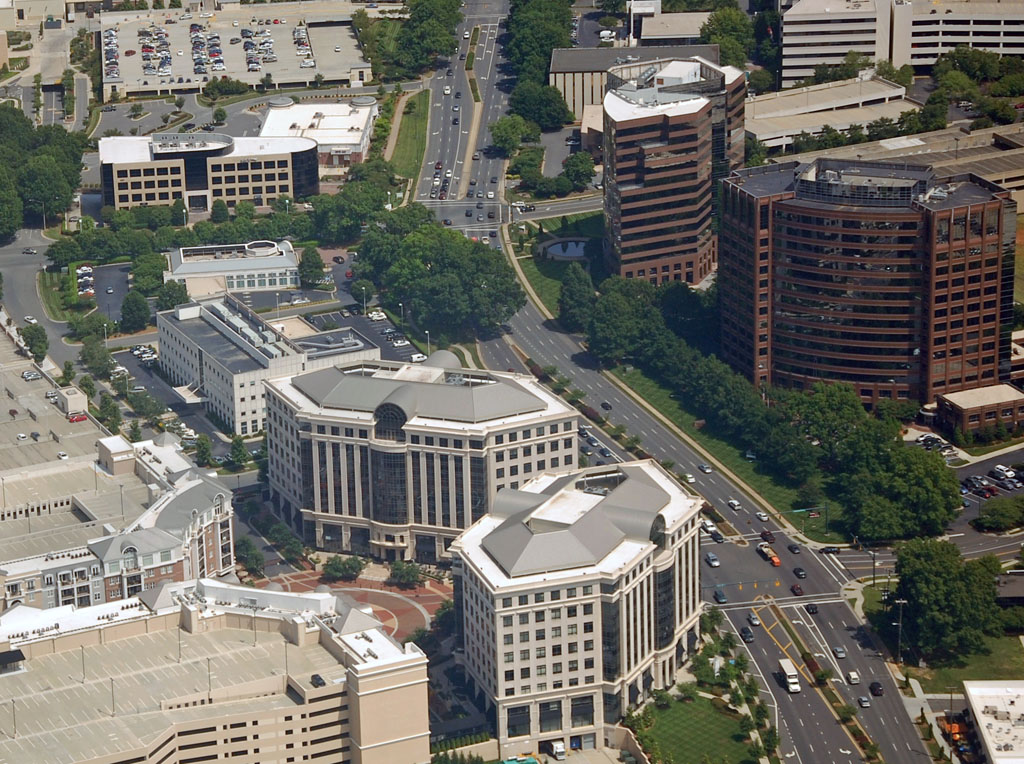
- SouthPark area in Charlotte with the Piedmont Center complex and part of the east side of SouthPark Mall
- Nicknames: Barclay Downs, Beverly Woods, Foxcroft, and Sharon Woods
- Location in Charlotte
- Coordinates: 35.14845°N 80.83091°W
- Country: United States
- State: North Carolina
- County: Mecklenburg County
- City: Charlotte
- Council District: 6
- Neighborhood Profile Areas: 7, 31, 42, 44, 133, 143, 210, 213, 358, 359
- Established: 1970s

Area
  - Edge city / Neighborhood: 8.0 sq mi (21 km^{2})
  - Land: 8.0 sq mi (21 km^{2})
  - Urban: 8.0 sq mi (21 km^{2})

Population (2015)
  - Edge city / Neighborhood: 17,765
  - Density: 2,200/sq mi (860/km^{2})
- Time zone: UTC-5 (EST)
  - Summer (DST): UTC-4 (EDT)
- Zip Code: 28209, 28210, 28211, 28226
- Area codes: 704 and 980

SouthPark is an area edge city in Charlotte, North Carolina, United States. Its name is derived from the upscale SouthPark Mall, which opened on February 12, 1970. At nearly 1.8 million square feet, SouthPark Mall is the largest shopping mall in Charlotte and all of the Carolinas. The area is geographically centered at the intersection of Fairview Road and Sharon Road in the south central sector of the city, about six miles south of Uptown Charlotte. In addition to being home to the mall, SouthPark is also a residential area and one of the larger business districts in Charlotte.

== History ==
The neighborhood was once a part of a 3,000-acre (1,200 ha) farm owned by former North Carolina Governor Cameron Morrison. The front entrance to the mall is on Sharon Road, with The Village at SouthPark and Belk Department Store anchoring each side of the front drive. Debuting in 2007 with 150 boutique apartments above boutique retail including North Carolina's first Crate & Barrel, The Village at SouthPark marked one of the first "Live, Work, Play" projects by Simon Property Group In the country. In the early 2000s, the Ivey family sold to Dillards, and the Belk Family sold to Sycamore Group of New York in the 2010s—both families notably conceptualized SouthPark Mall in the 1960s as anchoring the new edge city to be built on the 3,000 acre country farm owned by Governor Morrison. The English Country Manor House still exists today, in its original location in the-now Deering Oaks subdivision. Like Barclay Downs and Foxcroft, there are no markers naming the first subdivisions to be built directly adjacent to his homestead. Coming from the Myers Park school campuses on Colony Road, take a left on Richardson Drive, veering right into the private drive between the masonite fence posts boasting Turkeys on top. These marked the original entrance to Morrocroft before being developed. To the right, is the former horse stables/carriage house—now a single-family home. Straight ahead is the Manor. This upper-section of Deering Oaks, traditionally being the most private in SouthPark, is also a popular stretch for walking/running leisure along the SouthPark Corridor. The neighborhood, Morrocroft, comes from the original name Morrison gave the farm.

=== 2023 Construction Fire ===
At approximately 9:00 AM EST of May 18, 2023, a five-alarm fire broke out at a parking garage under construction on the 7700 block of Liberty Row Drive. Charlotte Fire Department chief Reginald Johnson would later state the fire was accidental, and began at the ramp between the parking garage and second floor in a construction trailer containing a foam insulation spraying equipment; later investigations revealed a small diesel engine, which was actively running in the trailer at the time, suffered a "catastrophic failure" and burst into flames. The large amount of exposed wood and construction debris caused the fire to quickly spread, requiring the response of more than 90 emergency personnel, and the evacuation of homes and businesses in the area as a thick black plume of smoke obscured a large part of southwestern Charlotte. The fire, which reached a peak temperature of over 2,000 °F (1,093 °C), would later collapse both the parking garage and the under-construction apartment complex connected to it. Smaller fires spread to other locations in the immediate area, with civilians battling them with fire extinguishers.

Fifteen construction workers were rescued from the blaze, with one tower crane operator being hospitalized for smoke inhalation; the operator had attempted to use the crane to rescue two coworkers who were reported trapped, Demonte Sherrill and Reuben Holmes. Sherrill had started a Facebook Live stream to alert rescuers of his and Holmes' location. While firefighters were able to hear the two men, a rescue attempt was forced to evacuate. Sherrill and Holmes were later confirmed to have died in the fire and collapse.

Many news anchors reported the incident to be the largest structural fire in recent Charlottean history. OSHA investigated the incident, and discovered that there were no proper fire evacuation measures in place on the construction site, and that there was only one method of egress from the part of the building on the sixth floor where Sherrill and Holmes were trapped. Based on this information and other findings, three of the contractor companies involved in the incident were fined by OSHA for violating proper safety procedures.

== Demographics ==
Historical population
Census	Pop.	Note	%±
2000	15,321		—
2010	16,549		8.0%
2015 (est.)	17,765		7.3%

As of 2010, SouthPark had a population of 16,549. The racial makeup of the neighborhood was 89.1% White American, 3.7% Black or African American, 2.5% Asian American, and 1.6% of some other race. Hispanic or Latino American of any race made up 3.1% of the population. The median household income for the area was $90,851.

== Transportation infrastructure ==
=== Mass transit ===
The following buses from the Charlotte Area Transit System (CATS) serve SouthPark:

- #19 (Park Road)
- #20 (Sharon Road)
- #28 (UNC Charlotte/Crosstown)
- #30 (Woodlawn/Crosstown)
- #57 (Archdale/SouthPark)

SouthPark serves as a transit hub with the SouthPark Community Transit Center, which is located on the parking deck of the SouthPark Mall, between Belk and Dillard's. The hub also serves as a transfer point to several stations along the Lynx Blue Line light rail.

=== Roads ===
Fairview Road (which turns into Tyvola Road going west and Sardis Road going east), Colony Road, Park Road, Sharon Road, Sharon Lane, and Morrison Boulevard are important thoroughfares in SouthPark. Interstate 77 also serves SouthPark via Tyvola Road at exit 5. Commuters rely on car transportation and congestion is common during rush hour.

== Economy ==
SouthPark is the home to the Fortune 300 company Nucor, as well as Dixon Hughes Goodman, National Gypsum, Coca-Cola Bottling Co. Consolidated, AmWINS Group, Carolinas AGC and Piedmont Natural Gas. Fluor, Bank of America Mortgage, First Citizens Bank, SunTrust Banks and CSX have major divisional operations located in SouthPark. The area is also home to the flagship store of grocer Harris Teeter.

== Retail ==
Within the limits of SouthPark, the upscale SouthPark Mall features many high-end designers and boutique stores. The Village at SouthPark, located adjacently, features stores restaurants. Other shopping complexes such as Phillips Place are within a close radius to SouthPark Mall and feature a diverse mix of tenants.

In 2011 SouthPark Mall was the most congested shopping mall in the United States during Black Friday weekend.

== Healthcare ==
Carolinas Medical Center, owned and operated by Atrium Health, serves SouthPark and surrounding areas. Atrium Health recently opened a new medical office complex within SouthPark featuring a medical office tower and freestanding emergency department.

== Education and library ==
=== School systems ===
Residents of SouthPark attend Charlotte-Mecklenburg Schools, including Beverly Woods Elementary, Selwyn Elementary, Sharon Elementary, Smithfield Elementary, Alexander Graham Middle, Carmel Middle, Quail Hollow Middle, Myers Park High School, Providence Day School and South Mecklenburg High School. Charlotte Country Day School is on the eastern edge of SouthPark.

=== Library ===
SouthPark is served by the South Park branch of the Public Library of Charlotte and Mecklenburg County.

== Sites of interest ==
- Morrocroft Manor

The Upper Section of Deering Oaks at Richardson Drive and Beverwyck Road, Sharon Lane, Lemon Tree, Arborway and Foxcroft Road are the anchors of SouthPark Corridor's route for runners, and home to Charlotte's celebrities from Billy Graham's family to NASCAR's Jeff Gordon.

- The architecturally notable Rotunda Building is located in SouthPark.

The architecturally notable Capitol Towers is located in SouthPark.

- The Symphony Park amphitheater at SouthPark is formerly home to Charlotte Symphony's Summer Pops concerts.
- SouthPark Mall hosts an annual Christmas tree lighting on or around Thanksgiving Day.

== See also ==
- Charlotte metropolitan area
