= The Mall at Lexington Green =

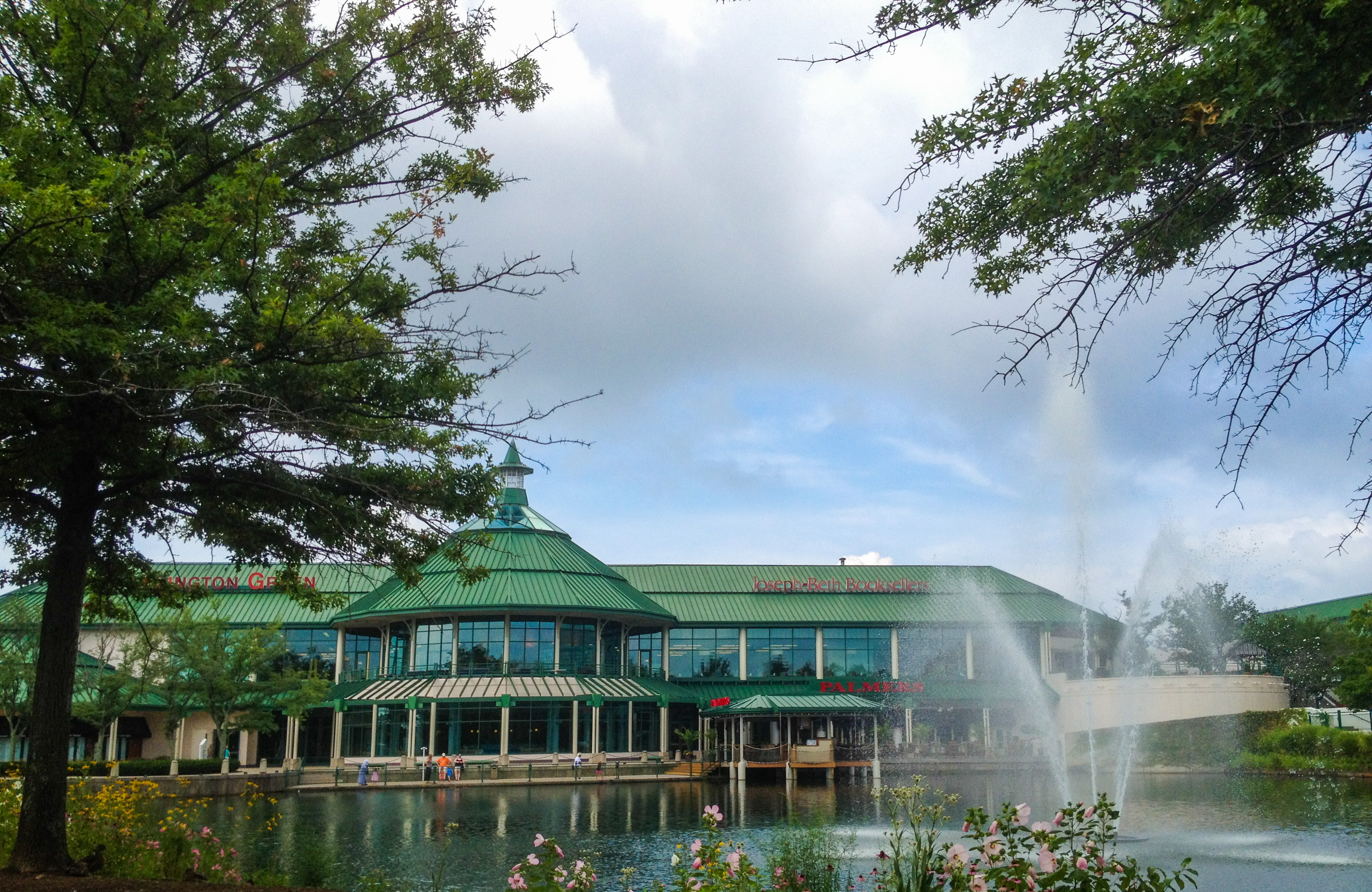
- The Mall at Lexington Green, September 2013
- Location: Lexington, Kentucky, United States
- Coordinates: 37.9946°N 84.5244°W
- Address: 161 Lexington Green Circle, Lexington, KY 40503
- Opened: September 11, 1986
- Owner: Langley Properties
- Num. of stores: 17
- Num. of anchor tenants: 2
- Floor area: 168,038 square feet (15,611.2 m^{2})
- Floors: 2
- Public transit: Lextran
- Website: ShopLexGreen.com

The Mall at Lexington Green is a hybrid enclosed shopping mall and outdoor lifestyle center in Lexington, Kentucky. Adjacent to Target and Fayette Mall, Lexington Green is located at the intersection of New Circle and Nicholasville Roads just north of the region's largest retail development.

Lexington Green is positioned as an upscale retail center. Anchor tenants include Joseph-Beth Booksellers, one of the region's largest bookstores; LOFT; Evereve; White House Black Market; Chico's; Lululemon Athletica and Anthropologie.

== History ==
The Mall at Lexington Green opened to the public on September 11, 1986, as a two-level hybrid enclosed mall and strip mall. From 1986 to 2007 the mall saw many different in and out tenants originally anchored by Disc Jockey Music, Joseph-Beth Booksellers, and Sears Homelife. The mall space was originally very vacant with only a few businesses inside of it, but that is no longer the case. The mall stayed this way until Joseph-Beth Booksellers was recognized by Greater Lexington Chamber of Commerce as the "1989 Small Business of the Year." This led to local development group Langley Properties acquiring the mall in the mid-1990s and convert most of the vacant upper and lower level spaces of the mall into space for the bookstore leaving only about seven enclosed spaces in the mall. By this time another anchor CompUSA moved into the old Joseph-Beth space. By the mid-2000s the mall began to lose many tenants. Sears Homelife closed and a furniture department was reincorporated into the main Fayette Mall store. The space was later renovated and occupied by Wild Oats Markets, and later changed to Whole Foods Market. CompUSA and Disc Jockey closed in 2007 leading many of the other tenants to close their doors as well.

On April 1, 2011, Langley Properties announced that Jeffrey R. Anderson Real Estate, Inc would be handling leasing efforts as the mall will be redeveloped entirely into a lifestyle center.

== Popularity in Lexington ==
In recent years, the shopping center has grown in popularity among older teens, young adults, and middle to upper class locals that embrace the art culture in Lexington.
