= Renovatus =

Renovatus may refer to:

- Renovatus of Mérida, 7th-century bishop in Spain
- Renovatus, a church based in Eastland Mall (Charlotte, North Carolina)
