= Heroes Convention =

Comic book convention in Charlotte, North Carolina

- Status: Active
- Genre: comic book
- Venue: Charlotte Convention Center (1995–present)
- Locations: Charlotte, North Carolina
- Country: USA
- Inaugurated: 1982
- Attendance: 50,000 (2022)
- Organizer: Shelton Drum/Heroes Aren't Hard To Find
- Filing status: for profit
- Website: Official website

Heroes Convention, or HeroesCon, is a comic book convention that takes place in June (often over Father's Day weekend) in Charlotte, North Carolina. The convention has been held since 1982 and is one of the oldest and "the largest independently owned comic book convention in the U.S.". The convention has a history of charitable work, donating to the Comic Book Legal Defense Fund and the Charlotte Firefighters Burned Children's Fund. HeroesCon is organized by Shelton Drum, owner of Heroes Aren't Hard To Find, a comic book retailer just southeast of downtown Charlotte.

HeroesCon focuses primarily on comic books, almost to the exclusion of TV, movies, and video games seen at most other major so-called comic book conventions. Along with panels, seminars, and workshops with comic book professionals, HeroesCon features hours of other programming on all aspects of comic books and pop culture. HeroesCon features a large floorspace for exhibitors including comic-book dealers and collectibles merchants. Like most comics conventions, the show includes an autograph area, as well as areas where comics artists and writers sign autographs and sell or do free sketches.

Annual events include the "Quickdraw Contest," in which artists create drawings on the spot for prizes; and an art auction.

== History ==
Shelton Drum had been running an event called the Charlotte Mini-Con, a one-day event held at Eastland Mall (near his comic book store), since 1977, but in 1982 decided to expand the event and rename it the Heroes Convention. (Drum opened his first retail location in 1980.) The show grew from being a very small trade-show environment (held in a Holiday Inn ballroom) to being a true convention, with special guests at the 1982 show including Mike Zeck, Butch Guice, and New Teen Titans creators George Pérez, Marv Wolfman, and Romeo Tanghal.

The 1984 convention featured Stan Lee as its guest of honor, and since then each year of the convention has had an array of famous guests. Due to a death in Drum's family, the event was not held in 1986. Joe Quesada has appeared at the convention frequently since 1992, first as an artist, then as editor-in-chief of Marvel Comics. George Pérez has also been a frequent guest of the show over the years.

Since 1995, the convention has taken place at the Charlotte Convention Center. The 1995 edition attracted 9,000 attendees, and featured guest Todd McFarlane, who signed over 2,000 autographs at the show. The 1998 show was the first stop on the "Trilogy Tour" II, which included Jeff Smith, Charles Vess, Linda Medley, Mark Crilley, Jill Thompson, and Stan Sakai.

In 2005, HeroesCon debuted "Indie Island," a section of the convention dedicated to alternative, independent, and self-published comics and creator.

The 2010 show hosted the closing ceremonies of the comic-themed art show Super! The Fine Art of Comics (curated by Shelton Drum), on display at the Charlotte gallery Twenty-Two.

The 2012 Heroes Convention—the 30th anniversary show—was held June 22–24 and featured special guest Stan Lee.

Heroes Convention has experienced tremendous growth, as attendance has increased to around 35,000 by 2015. 2016 saw further increases, with the show topping previous years with around 40,000 attendees. Heroes Convention's 35th anniversary show was held from June 16–18, 2017, included Eisner Award winners Alan Davis, Skottie Young, Jaime Hernandez, Gilbert Hernandez and Jason Aaron as guests.

The 2020 and 2021 HeroesCon were cancelled due to the COVID-19 pandemic. Since returning for the "Fantastic 40th Heroes Convention" in 2022, the show has continued to experience growth, with 50,000 persons attending.

=== Controversy: Wizard World Atlanta ===
In 2005, Wizard Entertainment announced that it would be holding a comic book convention in Atlanta from June 30–July 2, 2006, the same dates on which HeroesCon was scheduled to take place. This caused an outcry among fans, as Atlanta is only a four-hour drive from Charlotte, and several comic book creators, including artist Cully Hamner and writer Matt Fraction (himself a former Heroes Aren't Hard To Find employee), voiced concerns about an attempt by a large, corporate event to force out an independent comic book convention. As a result of the outcry, many comic book creators, including Warren Ellis, Bryan Hitch, Greg Rucka, Tony Harris, Scott Kurtz, Gaijin Studios and Art Adams, signed up to appear at HeroesCon 2006. In mid-August 2005, Wizard announced that it would be pushing back their Atlanta convention until 2007.
