= Shoppes at Park Place =

Pinellas Square Mall
- Location: Pinellas Park, Florida
- Coordinates: 27°50′13″N 82°41′08″W
- Opened: April 13, 1977; 49 years ago
- Closed: 2004; 22 years ago
- Demolished: 2004; 22 years ago
- Developer: Edward J. DeBartolo Corp.
- Num. of anchor tenants: 0 (originally 3)
- Floors: 2

The Shoppes at Park Place is a shopping center in Pinellas Park, Florida, USA. It is anchored by Marshalls, Target, Regal Cinemas, and Academy Sports + Outdoors, with junior anchors Conn's HomePlus and Petco. It is built on the site of the former Pinellas Square (later ParkSide) Mall.

== History ==
Pinellas Square Mall opened on April 13, 1977 with anchor J. C. Penney, followed by Montgomery Ward on November 2, and finally Ivey's on September 18, 1978. A three-screen General Cinema Corporation theater opened on May 27, 1977. It was owned by DeBartolo Realty Corporation. Ivey's became Dillard's in 1990, with Dillard's acquisition of Ivey's that year.

By 1996, the mall was owned by the John Hancock Insurance Company, who acquired the property in lieu of foreclosure after DeBartolo began defaulting on mortgage payments shortly before their acquisition by Simon Property Group. While they brought in Divaris National LLC to help manage the mall, inline tenants continued to slip and the mall's occupancy rate slipped to 50% by late 1996. A $20 million renovation, supposed to be started by winter 1996, was delayed due to the owners being unable to gain approval from all three anchors in time. Renovations began in 1997, with a 120 by 50 feet ice skating rink opening in early August, to be followed by a food court set to open in September. A new movie theater was also announced, but had not opened by the time of the mall's grand re-opening in October. The mall was renamed to ParkSide Mall in 1998.

By 2000, the mall had again fallen to a 50% occupancy rate, and had begun leasing to alternative tenants such as a public library. The new theater was set to open in spring that year, but R/C Cinemas Parkside Movies 16 did not open until March 30, 2001. Montgomery Wards closed in 2001, and was replaced with Park Avenue Coat Company for four months in 2002. The mall had risen to a 62% occupancy rate by 2002, including further alternative tenants such as a dance studio and a pet adoption center. The mall was offered for sale in December 2002 with an asking price of $25 million and an occupancy rate of 78%, and was later purchased by Tampa-based Boulder Venture South for $12 million in May 2003.

In October 2003 a plan to demolish the mall for a new shopping center, the Shoppes At Park Place, was approved by Pinellas Park officials. Dillard's closed in January 2004, followed by the JCPenney Outlet Store in May, and the mall finally closed for good in June. R/C Cinemas survived demolition; it was acquired and rebranded as Regal Park Place Movies 16, and opened, after delays, in August 2005. Demolition of the mall was underway by November 2004. Target officially closed on a property at the new plaza in January 2005, along with American Signature Furniture, Michaels, and several banks and restaurants. Target was set to open in October.

The plaza faced a $71 million foreclosure lawsuit in 2018, resulting in the plaza being listed for sale by Colliers International later that year.
