= The Bon Marché Building of Asheville, North Carolina =

Coordinates: 35.5954°N 82.5548°W

The Bon Marché Building of Asheville, North Carolina, now the Haywood Park Hotel, was built in 1923 by E.W. Grove for the store's owner, Solomon Lipinsky. This was several years before Grove began construction on nearby Grove Arcade, one of Asheville's most famous architectural landmarks. The Bon Marché building was designed by W.L. Stoddart, a hotel architect who also designed the Battery Park Hotel and Vanderbilt Hotel.

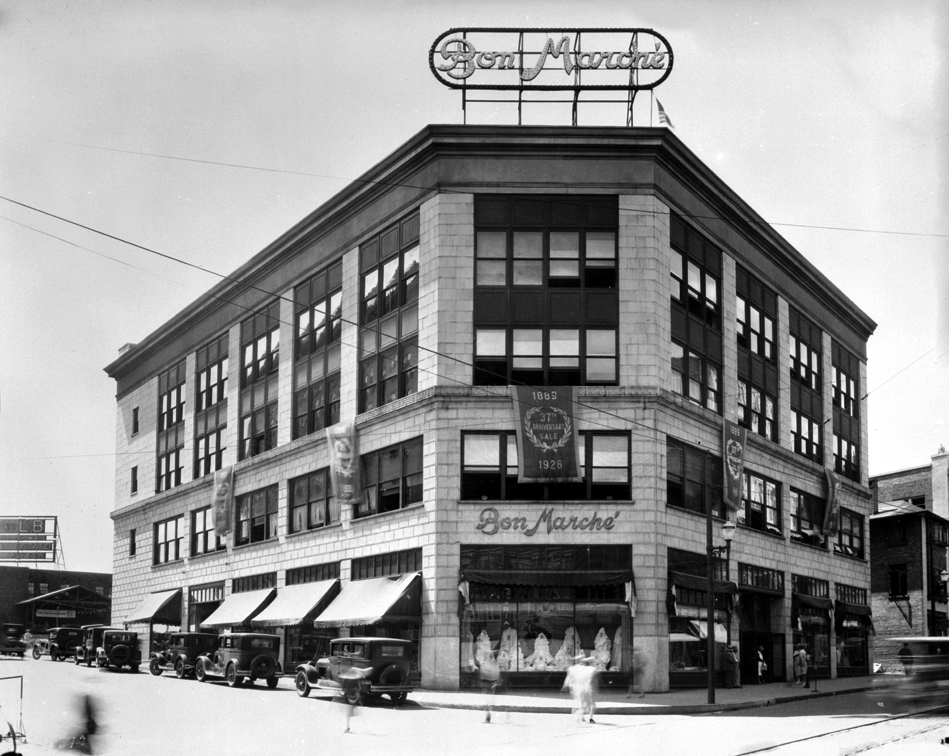
The Bon Marché

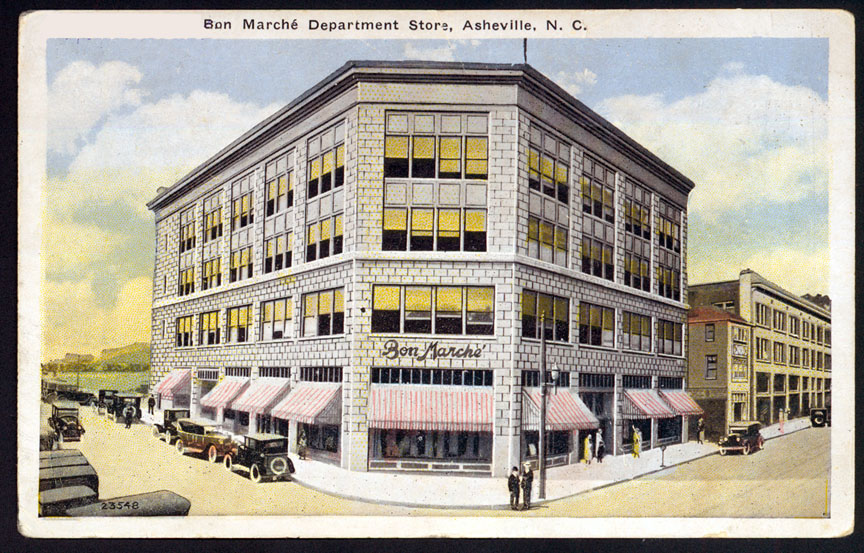
Postcard of The Bon Marché

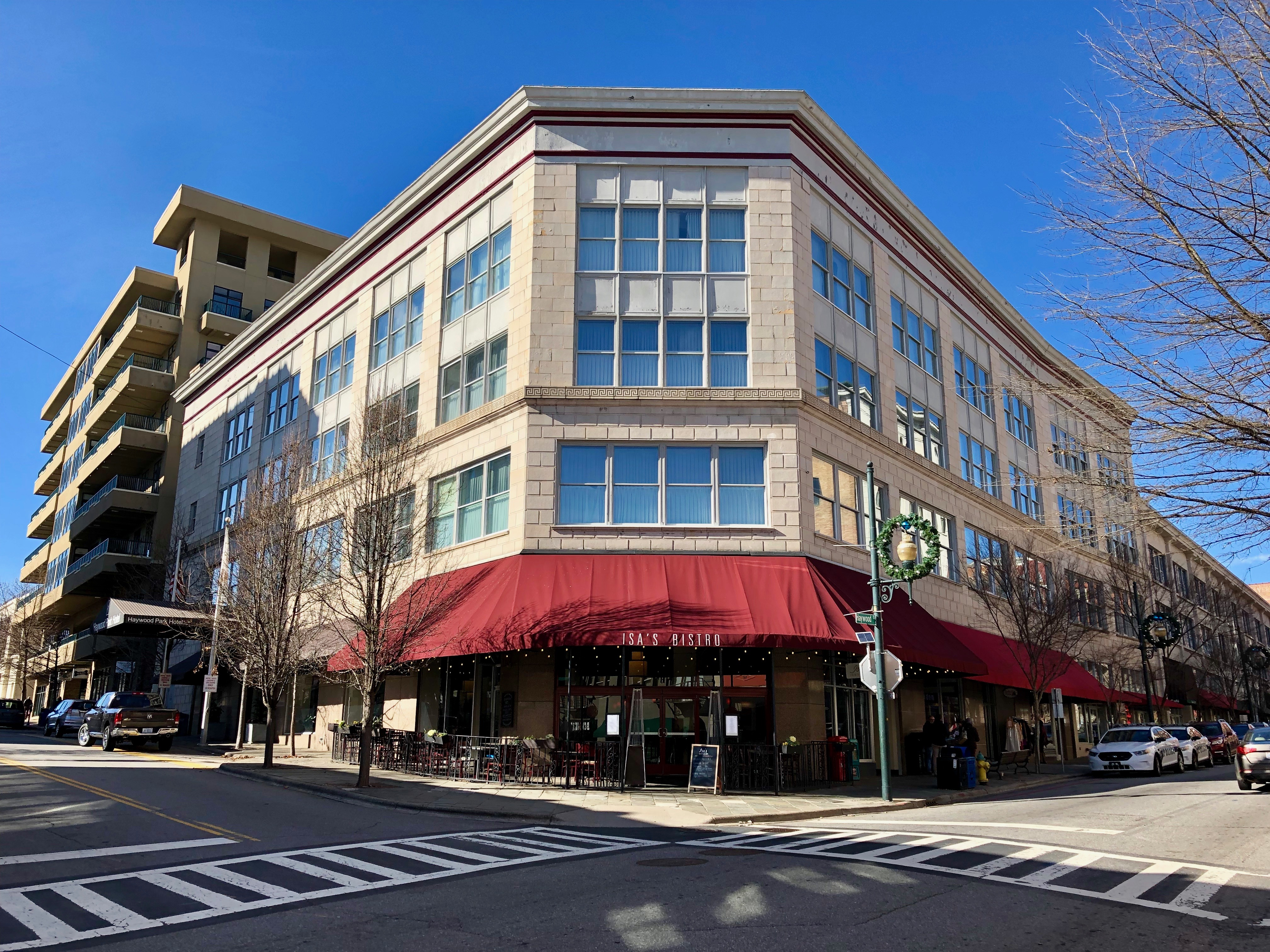
Haywood Park Hotel in 2019

It now houses the Haywood Park Hotel, a member of Historic Hotels of America.

This new building served as a larger location for the Bon Marché, originally called Lipinsky and Ellick, which was founded in downtown Asheville in the 1890s. The owner, Solomon Lipinsky, was a prominent Jewish businessman and community leader in Asheville. from the 1890s to 1978, nearly 90 years, the Bon Marché became the longest running department store in Asheville's history. The name Bon Marché, meaning "the good deal" or "the good market" in French, came from Le Bon Marché, one of the world's first department stores located in Paris.

In a 1938 letter to Solomon Lipinsky's son, Lewis Lipinsky, in preparation for the store's 50th anniversary, Asheville author Thomas Wolfe says "…Bon Marché is such a landmark in Asheville life that if I ever heard anything had happened to it I think I should feel almost as if Beaucatcher Mountain had been violently removed from the landscape by some force of nature. I know that as long as I can remember, at any rate, it has always stood with the women folk at home for the best in merchandise and fashion…"

After The Bon Marché Store moved across the street in 1937, Ivey's Department Store took over the Bon Marché building. Ivey's Department Store became a staple in downtown Asheville during the mid-20th century.

In 1985 the Bon Marché building was renovated with the removal of some 1950s and 1960s additions, such as a semicircular awning incompatible with the building's original style. The Haywood Street Redevelopment Corp. converted it into the Haywood Park Hotel and Atrium, a multi-use property which currently houses the Haywood Park Hotel, Isa's Bistro, as well as retail and office spaces; the conversion was completed in 1988. The hotel is a member of Historic Hotels of America.
