= Colonial Stores =

American grocery store chain

- Type: Subsidiary
- Industry: Supermarket/Retail
- Founded: December 5, 1940 (85 years ago)
- Defunct: 1988 (38 years ago)
- Fate: Banner eliminated
- Headquarters: Atlanta, Georgia, U.S.
- Number of locations: 435 (1965)
- Parent: National Food Products (1940-1978); Grand Union (1978-1983)

Colonial Stores was a chain of grocery stores once found throughout much of the South. Most were transformed to Big Star Markets in the 1970s and later most became Harris Teeter or A&P.

== History ==
=== David Pender Grocery Company ===
The chain evolved from Norfolk, Virginia's D. P. Pender Grocery Stores, the first of which opened in 1900. In its early years the company used horse drawn wagons to deliver goods to customers. In 1919 Pender opened a second grocery store in Norfolk, later expanding to more locations in Central and Eastern Virginia. Pender retired on January 1, 1926, making the David Pender Grocery Company a publicly owned corporation which later became a subsidiary of National Food Products Corporation. By Pender's retirement the company owned 244 stores and employed more than 1,500 people. In 1930 the company made an average of $35,000 in sales per store.

=== L. W. Rogers Grocery Company ===
L. W. Rogers opened the first of his grocery stores in Atlanta, Georgia in 1892. In the next twenty years the company expanded to other locations in Georgia and South Carolina. By 1926 Rogers' company was owned by National Food Products Corporation.

=== Colonial Stores ===
In 1937 National Food Products opened two combined Pender-Rogers self-service supermarkets, under the name "Big Star", in Griffin, Georgia and Greensboro, North Carolina. Subsequently some smaller stores were also opened under the name "Little Star". In 1940 the chains were officially combined under the name Colonial Stores, Inc. In 1947 the company introduced its rooster logo. In 1950 the company made $179 million in total sales, an average of $488,637 per store.

In 1955 the Cincinnati-based Albers Super Markets and the Indianapolis-based Stop and Shop Companies were acquired by National Food Products and put under the Colonial Stores label.

In the 1970s most of the stores were moved to the Big Star label.

In 1978 the New Jersey–based Grand Union purchased the Colonial Stores chain. This move was initially blocked by the Federal Trade Commission out of fear Grand Union would be violating anti-trust laws. This was later dismissed and the purchase was allowed to go ahead.

The Norfolk stores were closed in the 1980s, and many were purchased by the Food Town chain. In 1988 the stores owned by Grand Union were resold. The North Carolina and Virginia stores were acquired by Harris-Teeter, and the Atlanta stores were acquired by A&P.

== Locations ==
The company at its peak owned over 500 stores across Alabama, Florida, Georgia, Maryland, North Carolina, South Carolina, and Virginia. The company had 435 stores by 1964.

Its headquarters were located in Atlanta in 1955.
