= Eastland Mall (Charlotte, North Carolina) =

- Eastland Mall logo/entrance
- Location: Charlotte, North Carolina, United States
- Coordinates: 35.206799°N 80.752236°W
- Address: 5471 Central Ave
- Opened: July 30, 1975; 51 years ago
- Closed: June 30, 2010; 16 years ago (demolished beginning October 1, 2013)
- Demolished: 2013-2014
- Developer: Faison Enterprises
- Owner: City of Charlotte
- Num. of stores: 59
- Num. of anchor tenants: 1
- Floor area: 1,100,000 sq ft (100,000 m^{2}) (GLA)
- Floors: 3

Eastland Mall was a shopping mall in Charlotte, North Carolina. The center opened on July 30, 1975, as the then-largest mall in North Carolina with three anchor department stores, Belk, J.C. Penney, and Ivey's. A Sears, Roebuck and Company store joined four years later. The mall was owned by Glimcher Realty Trust and the City of Charlotte. Glimcher requested the mall be put into receivership due to heavy debt, and there were reports of the mall entering foreclosure. LNR sold the interior space in the mall to Boxer Properties of Houston for $2 million. It ceased operations on June 30, 2010, and was purchased by the city of Charlotte from Boxer Properties, and the owners of the vacant anchors in hopes of selling it to a developer.

After its takeover, the mall was maintained by the city of Charlotte. By a 10–1 vote on May 28, 2013, the Charlotte city council formally voted to demolish the mall for $871,520, as possible developers stated they had no use for the building. Demolition began on October 1, 2013.

The Eastland Community Transit Center, a planned stop on the LYNX Rapid Transit Services Center City Corridor, is in the parking lot at the mall.

CharlotteEAST, a community development organization,, was founded by the City in 2003 to help steer the redevelopment of the site and surrounding business ecosystem.

== A thriving mall: 1975–1990s ==
Development began on a shopping center in east Charlotte in the early 1970s after seeing the success of SouthPark Mall about 6 miles (10 km) away. Henry Faison, the developer, recalls planning the mall with a team of only six people. On July 30, 1975, Eastland Mall opened to much fanfare as the biggest mall in North Carolina at that time. Eastland Mall had an ice skating rink and the first food court in North Carolina. The food court was the East Coast's first in-mall food court at the time. Additionally, the mall included an outparcel convenience center with a Harris Teeter grocery store. Miller & Rhoads had a small specialty store at the mall, which was closed in 1986. In the early 1990s, Ivey's became Dillard's and the store expanded, and the mall's interior was renovated and updated as well.

== Decline: 1990s–2010 ==
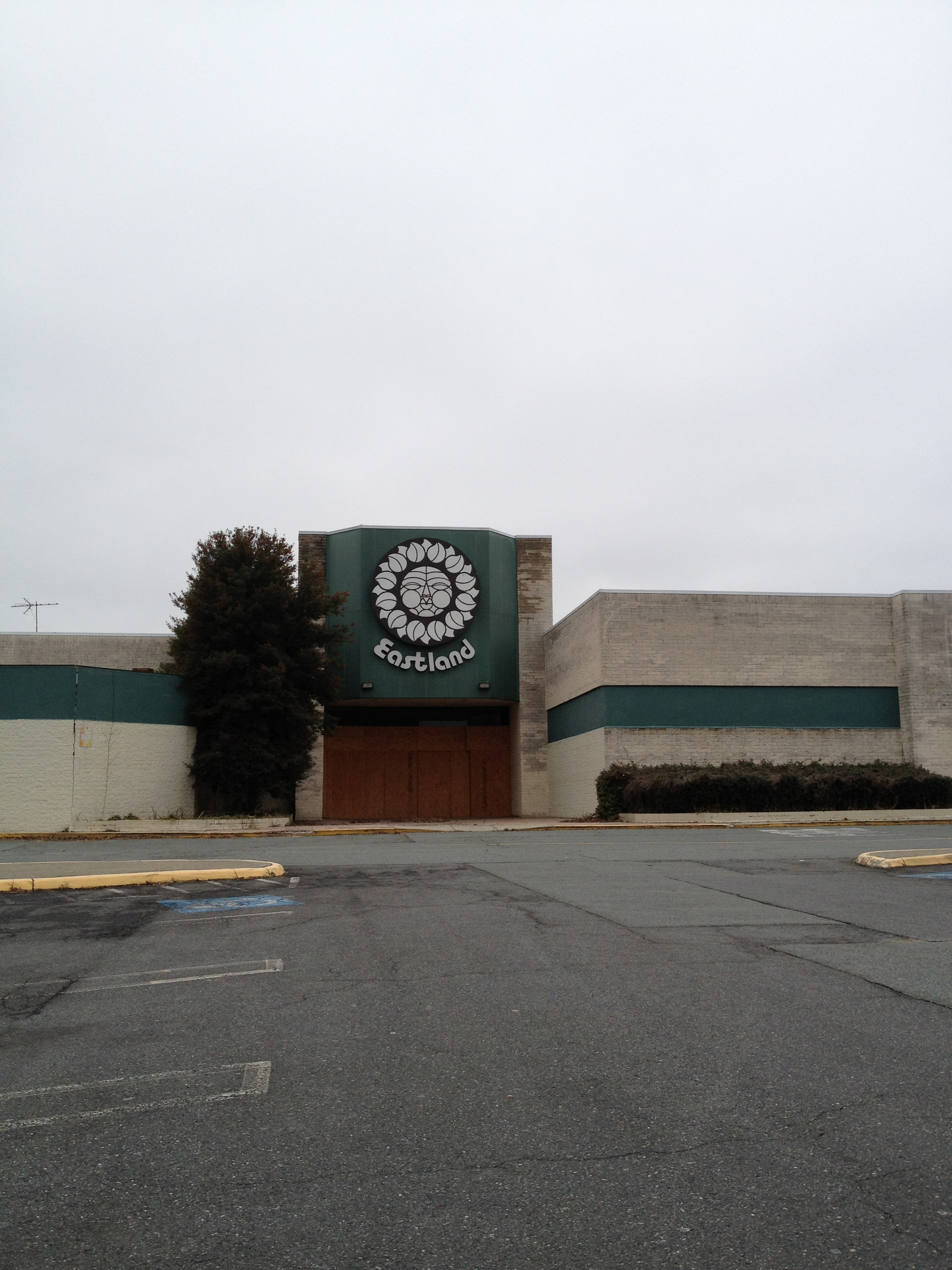
Eastland Mall entrance, January 2012

=== Demographic changes ===
By the late 1990s, Eastland Mall's image and physical appearance began to degrade. Adding to the retail shift in Charlotte, demographic changes to the surrounding areas changed the retail makeup of the mall. Crime rates also increased around the mall. In 1997, The Coffee Beanery Inc., a tenant at the mall, sued ownership claiming its sales decline was a result of the increase in crime.

In 1998, Glimcher Realty Trust acquired the mall for $54 million.

In 2000, Foot Locker and Waves Music doubled the sizes of their stores. That year, the mall had 12 kiosks.

In 2001, the city commissioned a study on redeveloping the mall.

In 2002, Belk considered closing its store, claiming a decline in the mall.

In 2003, Glimcher bought out its partners for $4.75 million to acquire full ownership of the mall.

In late 2005, there was a shooting inside the mall near the Gourmet Gardens food court and also a shooting outside in the parking lot. Another shooting took place in 2006 near the food court. A bullet smashed one of the glass doors and one person was shot.

=== Retail changes ===
The first original anchor store to depart the mall was J.C. Penney, which left in 2002, a few years after becoming a J.C. Penney Outlet store. In 2004, the anchor space was split up and a Burlington Coat Factory store took the upper level, while the bottom space was subdivided between a Fred's discount store and Prime Time store. Dillard's closed off one level of its store in 2005, and operated a Dillard's Clearance Center on the other level.

In 2005, Glimcher Realty Trust tried to sell the mall, but could not find an interested buyer.

The Harris Teeter store on the periphery closed on June 26, 2006, after being in operation since 1975. The store cited underperformance as the cause for its closure; however, changing demographics and lack of investment in remodeling may have contributed to this store's demise.

Belk closed in February 2007, becoming the third anchor to leave the mall.

One day after the announcement of Belk's departure, Eastland Mall officials announced the original movie theater showing first-run films would reopen after closing in 1996. It had reopened in the last few years but was only specializing in foreign language films and 'G' and 'PG' rated films.

On March 8, 2007, the Urban Land Institute Advisory Council shared its recommendations: to tear the mall down and make it into a vibrant community center with mixed-use shopping and an amusement park.

In early 2008, Limited Brands closed all five of its stores inside the mall, which included Bath & Body Works, The Limited and Victoria's Secret. Fred's and Prime Time closed as well, followed by the Dillard's Clearance Center and movie theater in October 2008.

The City of Charlotte had acquired an option to buy the vacant Dillard's anchor space.

In an earnings press release dated July 23, 2008, Glimcher Realty Trust announced that it "will not fund any further cash deficits at the property." The company also requested court-appointed receivership and liquidation for the property.

In February 2009, the former Ice House ice skating rink, which had been closed the previous year, was replaced with a soccer field.

However, these retail changes were accompanied by a degradation of the mall's physical appearance, which had deteriorated to the point that its owner, Glimcher Realty Trust, labeled the mall a "fixer-upper".

In 2007, Charlotte's then-mayor Pat McCrory labeled the area "corridors of crap" due to its inexpensive and aging retail structures.

In October 2008, the theater closed, one year after opening.

On February 26, 2009, Sears Holdings announced that the Sears store at Eastland would close on May 31, another major blow to the beleaguered mall.

In October 2009, ownership of the mall was transferred to the lender.

In 2010, Burlington Coat Factory, the mall's sole remaining anchor closed

In October 2009, Renovatus, a Christian local church took up residence in the mall's long shuttered theater. Renovatus, which calls itself "A Church for people under renovation", hoped to help reverse the decline in fortunes of the mall and its surrounding area, and clear Eastland of the violent, dangerous stigma that surrounds it. However, with the mall's closure, the church vacated its space and relocated.

== Closure: 2010–2013 ==
=== Ownership by Boxer Properties ===
In September 2009, the mall's owner said that if the city of Charlotte did not purchase the mall, it would be shuttered. The council decided against that in November 2006. On April 16, 2010, the remaining tenants were given notice to vacate by June 30, 2010, because of a foreclosure action filed against the mall. According to a letter sent to tenants dated April 16, 2010, "it is understood that the lender or any other party that acquires title to Eastland Mall at foreclosure will close the mall."

On June 28, 2010, ownership of the inner stores, parking lot and a few of the smaller outside buildings surrounding Eastland Mall were sold by LNR, the loan servicer, to Boxer Properties for $2.2 million. The outstanding principal balance on the loan was $42.2 million. The fate of the anchor stores, however, were left hanging in the balance. Boxer was expected to bring in retail and small-office tenants that fit with the diverse nature of Charlotte's east side, similar to the company's redevelopment of La Gran Plaza in Fort Worth, Texas. The mall was planned to reopen by Christmas 2011; however, nothing ever came out of it.

=== City ownership ===
On August 31, 2012, the city of Charlotte purchased the entire mall, as well as some of the outlying properties, for $13.2 million.

Potential redevelopment options included hotels and specialty shops. A studio known as Central Avenue Studios, expressed interest in purchasing the entire property for film uses, and as use as a film school, in conjunction with local education institutes like Central Piedmont Community College, Queens University of Charlotte, and the Charlotte-Mecklenburg Schools.

=== Demolition and redevelopment ===
On May 28, 2013, the city council voted to spend $800,000 to demolish Eastland Mall. Demolition began on October 1, 2013, with the Burlington Coat Factory Store the first to be torn down.

In 2016, the city sold 11.4 acres of the site to Charlotte-Mecklenburg Schools for $650,000, to construct a school. The sale left 69 acres of the site under control of the city. The city government plans to use its land as a catalyst for neighborhood redevelopment, envisioning a mixed-use district with housing and offices. The site was also planned to host the headquarters and training facilities of Major League Soccer team Charlotte FC, which would occupy 29 acres (12 ha) but the team eventually chose another location.

Developer Crossland Southeast was chosen as the master developer of the property. Construction started on 39 acres in August 2022 which include 155 single-family homes and townhomes, 280 multi-family units, 17,500 square feet of office and retail space, and a five-acre Mecklenburg County park. Future phases will include a grocery store.

Two proposals were presented to city council in June 2023 for the remaining 30 acres. The first is a 115,000 square foot indoor sports complex with outdoor soccer field, playground and jogging trail. The second is an outdoor sports facility, including six multi-use athletic fields with a 20,000 square foot Esports center and event space.
