= Phillips Place =

- Interactive map of the Phillips Place area

General information
- Status: Open
- Type: Shopping mall
- Location: 6800 Phillips Pl Ct, Charlotte, North Carolina, United States
- Opened: 1997; 29 years ago
- Owner: Simon Property Group
- Management: Simon Property Group

Technical details
- Floor count: 1
- Floor area: 134,000 square feet (12,400 m^{2}) of gross leasable area

Design and construction
- Developer: Lincoln Harris

Other information
- Number of stores: 28

Website
- simon.com/mall/phillips-place

Phillips Place is an outdoor shopping mall in the SouthPark neighborhood of Charlotte, North Carolina, United States. It is adjacent to SouthPark Mall, both of which are owned by Simon Property Group. Phillips Place spans 134,000 square feet (12,400 m^{2}) of gross leasable area and has 28 tenants.

== History ==
=== Planning ===
Phillips Place was first conceived in the mid 1990s by local developer Lincoln Harris as one of Charlotte's earliest purpose-built mixed-use lifestyle centers, combining retail, dining, residential, hotel, and public gathering areas. The pedestrian-oriented village opened in 1997 and was designed to complement the nearby SouthPark Mall located in Charlotte's SouthPark neighborhood. At the time of development, Charlotte did not have a formal mixed-use zoning category. As a result, the project required special zoning approvals to allow residential units to be integrated directly above street-level commercial space, making Phillips Place one of the first buildings in the area to utilize mixed-use zoning. The design focused on a European-inspired streetscape, featuring brick walkways, street furniture, landscaping, and inward-facing storefronts intended to create a walkable environment.

=== Opening ===
When it opened in June of 1997, the center included 133,000 square feet (12,400 m^{2}) of retail and restaurant space, a movie theater, a 124-room Hampton Inn and Suites, and luxury apartments. Early tenants included The Palm, P.F. Chang's, and a number of boutique retailers.

Throughout the 2000s and early 2010s, Phillips Place continued to operate as a retail and dining center with a mix of fashion stores, specialty shops, and restaurants.

In 2019, developer Lincoln Harris announced a renovation and modernization plan for Phillips Place, with an estimated budget of $50 million. The redevelopment updated the streetscape design and public spaces and reconfigured parking and access. A centerpiece of the renovation was the construction of a 41,000-square-foot RH Restoration Hardware Design Gallery, featuring a rooftop restaurant and expanded showroom spaces. The renovation was the first significant change to the center since its opening. Additional tenants included Alice + Olivia, Ralph Lauren, Hill House Home, and LoveShackFancy.

The center’s ownership structure shifted multiple times over the years. Lincoln Harris consolidated ownership of the center around 2019 as part of the redevelopment effort. The adjacent Hampton Inn & Suites, located within the Phillips Place complex, was acquired separately by Simon Property Group in a 2024 transaction. In 2025, Simon Property Group purchased the Phillips Place retail center itself. Following the acquisition, Simon announced plans to continue active investment in the center’s tenant mix, public spaces, and overall guest experience.
