= Joseph-Beth Booksellers =

Independent book store chain in the United States

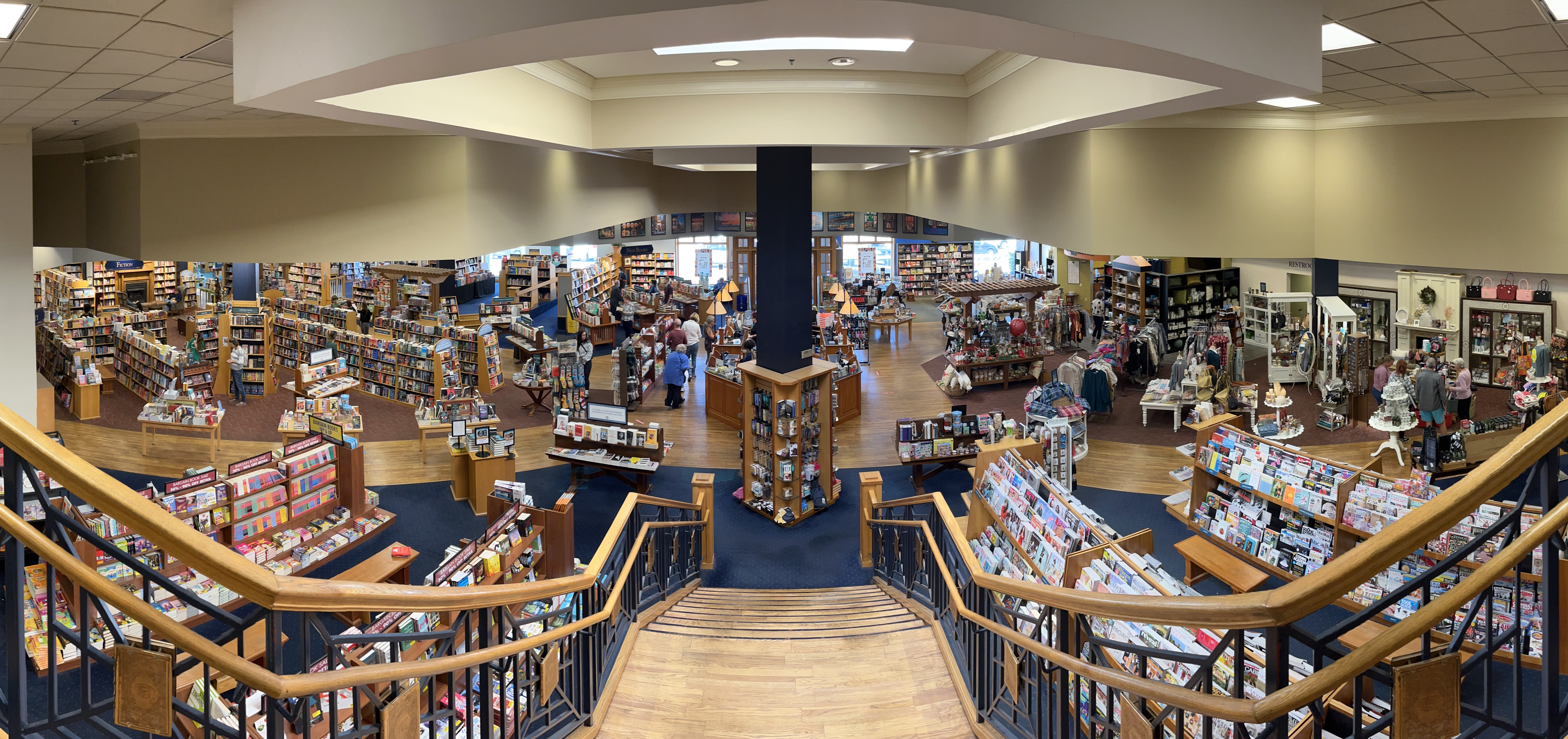
- Joseph-Beth's Cincinnati location in 2022
- Type: Bookshop
- Founded: November 1986; 39 years ago in Lexington, Kentucky
- Founder: Neil and Mary Beth Van Uum
- Number of locations: 2 (2022)
- Website: www.josephbeth.com

Joseph-Beth Booksellers is an independent bookseller with three stores in the United States. It formerly operated a total of seven under the Joseph-Beth name and two under the Davis-Kidd Booksellers name. The name "Joseph-Beth" derives from the middle names of its two founders, Neil and Mary Beth Van Uum. They opened their first store in Lexington, Kentucky in November 1986.

In 1989, they were recognized by the Greater Lexington Chamber of Commerce as the "1989 Small Business of the Year".

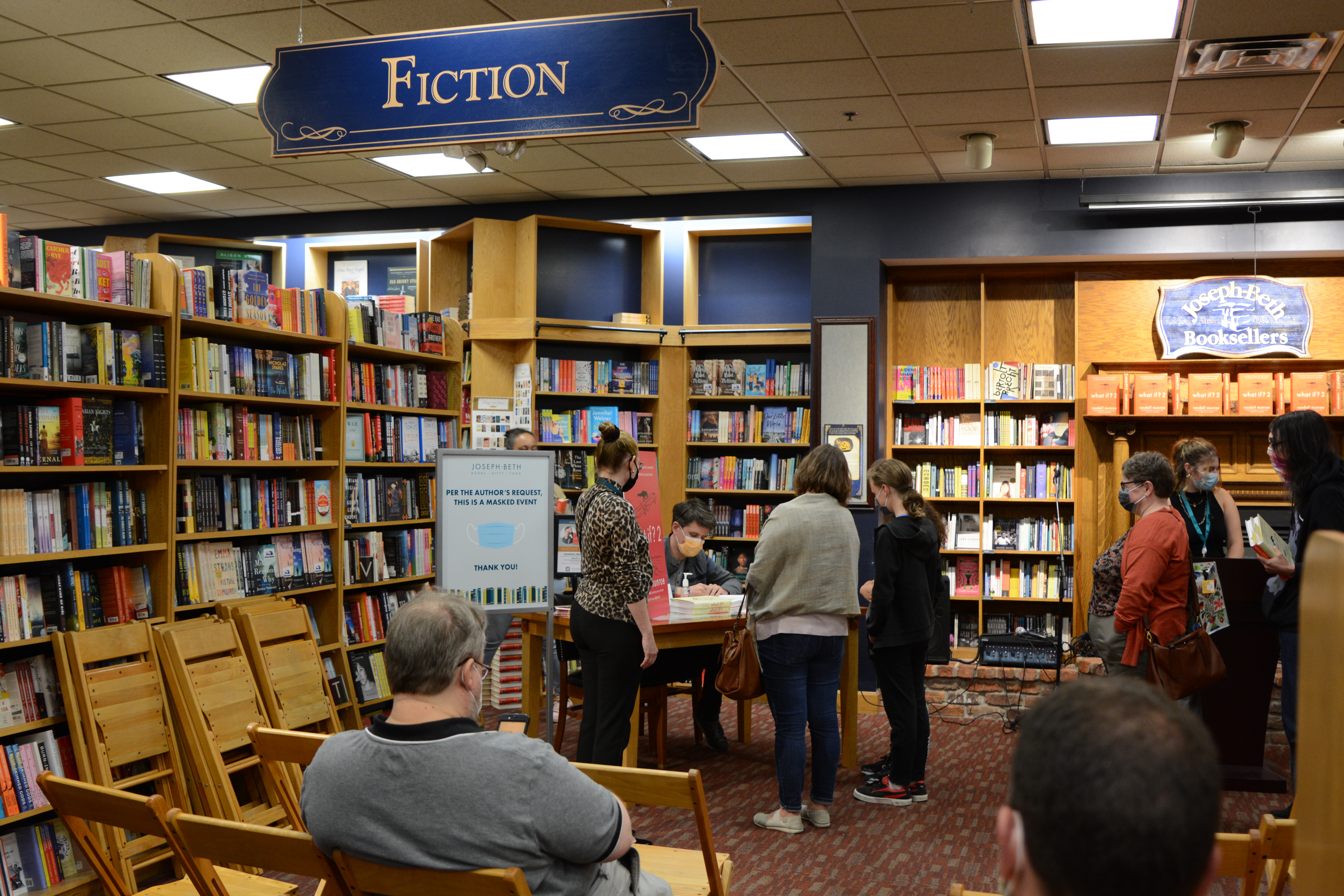
Author Randall Munroe signing books at Joseph-Beth in Cincinnati

In 1997, the company absorbed 4 Davis-Kidd Booksellers stores in Tennessee in Nashville, Knoxville, Memphis, and Jackson. The Knoxville store closed in 2000, but the Jackson bookstore remained open until 2006. The Nashville and Memphis locations remained open until 2010 and continued to operate under the Davis-Kidd name.

On November 11, 2010, Joseph-Beth filed for Chapter 11 bankruptcy protection and closed the Davis-Kidd location in Nashville, as well as Joseph-Beth locations in Pittsburgh, Charlotte, and one of the two locations in Northeast Ohio. In May 2011, the company and three of its stores were purchased by the Lexington, Kentucky store's landlord. The Fredericksburg, Virginia Joseph-Beth and the Memphis, Tennessee Davis-Kidd locations were initially sold to a liquidator. However, Joseph-Beth founder Neil Van Uum was able to purchase the Memphis location with the financial backing of the Memphis landlord from the liquidators and continued to operate the store as The Booksellers at Laurelwood, as the Davis-Kidd name was purchased in the bankruptcy auction. This store has since closed, and a new independent bookstore has opened in its place. The remaining three Joseph-Beth locations—Lexington, Cincinnati and the Cleveland Clinic specialty store—remain in operation under the new owner.

On November 14, 2011, Joseph-Beth opened their fourth location at Crestview Hills Town Center in Crestview Hills, Kentucky. This location was forced to close in May 2020 due to declining year-over-year sales and declining business due to COVID-19. On September 15, 2026, it was announced that Barnes and Noble had accuired Joseph-Beth saying it would "preserve its independent identity." As of 2026, there were only two stores remaining, The Mall at Lexington Green in Lexington, Ky. and Rookwood Pavilion in Cincinnati, both of which would be maintain by Barnes and Noble.
