= Big Star Markets =

Defunct American grocery store chain

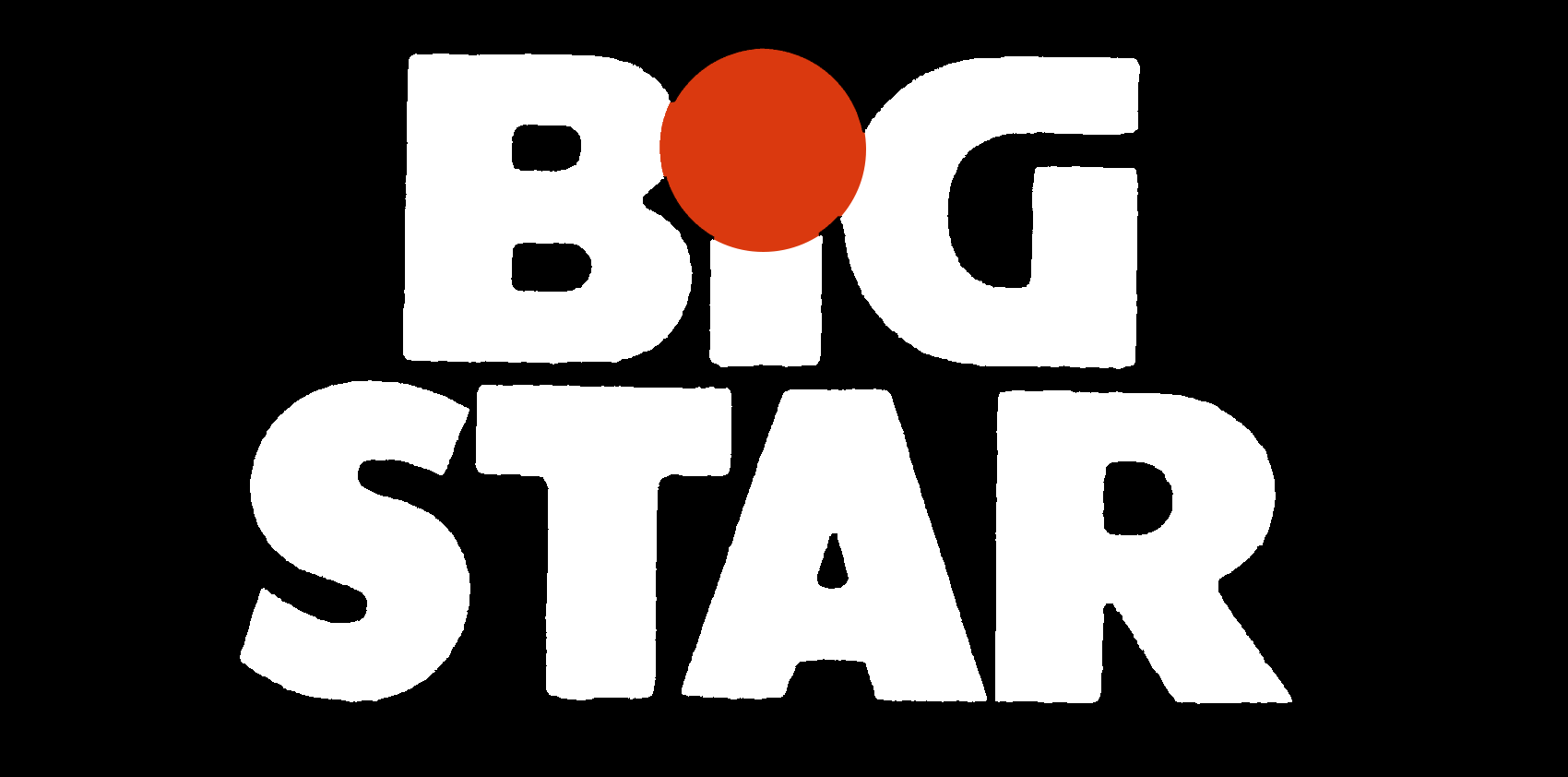
Big Star's final logo

Big Star was an American supermarket chain founded in 1937 as part of the David Pender Grocery Company.

== History ==
The Big Star stores were self-service supermarket operations which began to replace the small full-service stores Pender's had operated up to that point. By the late 1940s the entire company had rebranded under the Colonial Stores name. The Big Star name was revived around 1968 for a new discount chain owned by Colonial; eventually all stores were closed or converted to the Big Star name. Grand Union purchased the chain in 1978. The North Carolina, South Carolina, and Virginia stores were sold to Harris Teeter in 1988, while the Georgia stores were sold in 1992, with most of the Atlanta locations going to A&P. These stores were heavily remodeled, but eventually sold to Publix in 1999. Stores currently operating under the Big Star name in places like Alabama, Arkansas, Mississippi, and Tennessee, were part of a franchise operation that was never directly connected to the Big Star chain proper.

Alex Chilton and Chris Bell named their Memphis rock band of the same name after the supermarket chain.
