= Ivey's =

Department store chain

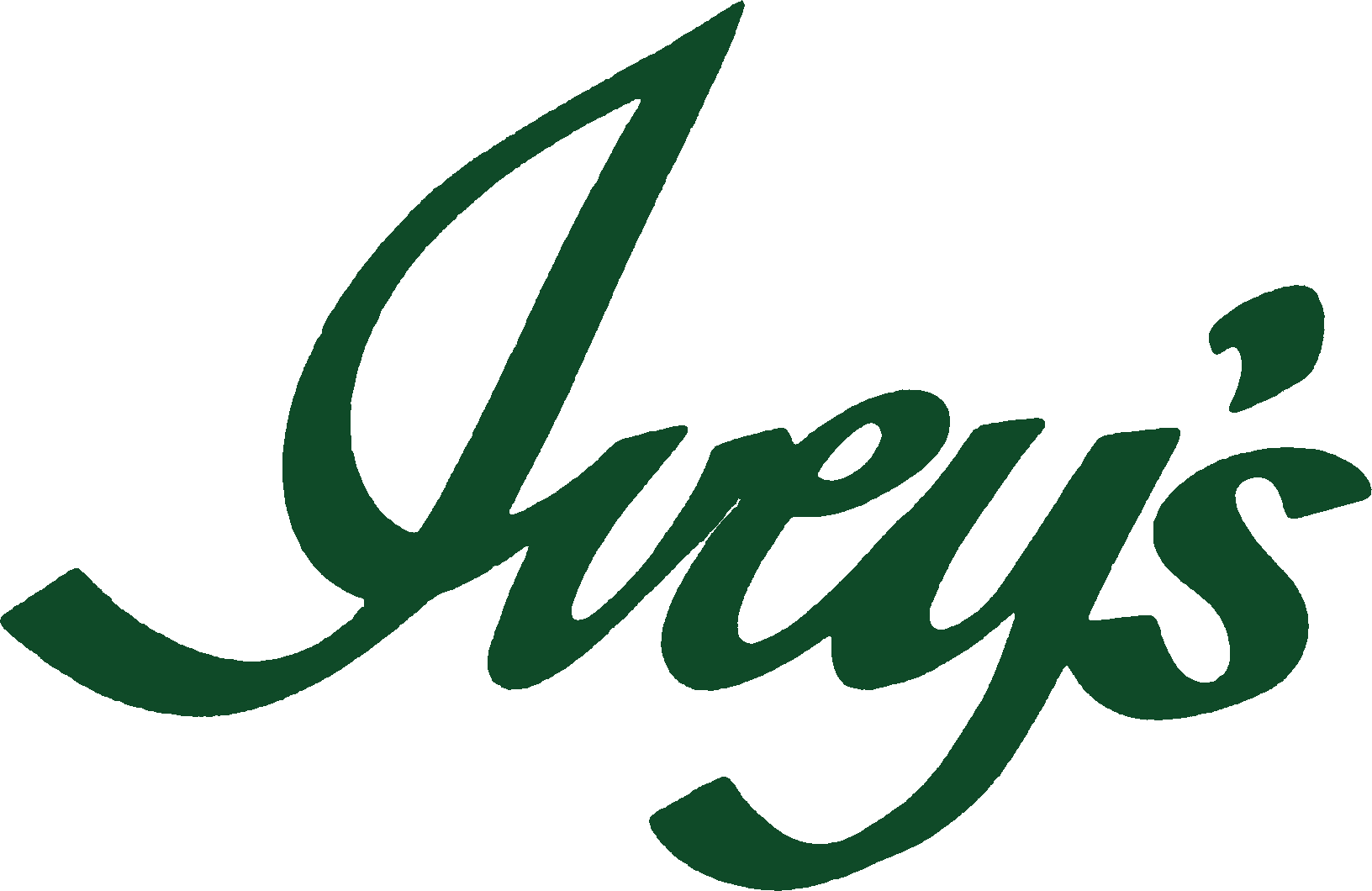
- Type: Department store
- Industry: Retail
- Founded: 1900 Charlotte, North Carolina
- Defunct: 1990
- Fate: Acquired by Dillard's
- Products: Clothing, footwear, bedding, furniture, jewelry, beauty products, and housewares.
- Website: None

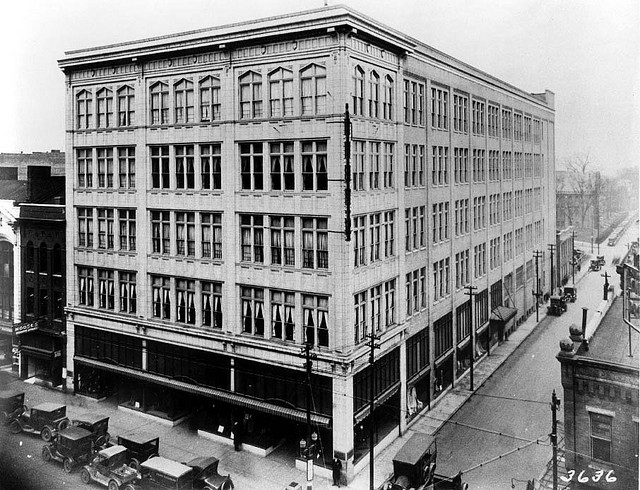

Ivey's (J.B. Ivey & Company), a former department store chain, was acquired by Dillard's, Inc. in 1990. Ivey's was based in Charlotte, North Carolina, and was founded in 1900 by Joseph Benjamin (J. B.) Ivey.

== History ==
J. B. Ivey opened the first Ivey's store on February 19, 1900, on North Tryon Street in Charlotte, North Carolina. The initial location, "one and half blocks from the town square," resulted in poor sales. Later in 1900, Ivey moved the store location to the first block of West Trade Street. The business grew and relocated to 13 North Tryon Street in fall 1914.

George M. Ivey, J. B. Ivey's only son, joined the company in 1920 and moved to convert the firm from a partnership to a corporation, which was completed in 1922. The company built a new store in Charlotte in 1924, which remained the only Ivey's store until 1935. Ivey's opened a store in Greenville, South Carolina, in 1935, and in Asheville, North Carolina, in 1937. Ivey's became a publicly traded corporation in the 1940s.

Ivey's was purchased by Marshall Field's in 1980. Marshall Field's itself would be purchased by BATUS Retail Group in 1982. Field's and its The Crescent, Frederick & Nelson, and Ivey's divisions joined other BATUS divisions, Gimbel's, Kohl's, and Saks Fifth Avenue. BATUS sold Ivey's to Dillard's in 1990, prior to the sale of Marshall Field's to Dayton Hudson Corporation. Ivey's typically offered more upscale merchandise than another Charlotte-based chain, Belk, which was a competitor to Ivey's in many Southern cities. The two chains were frequent neighbors at many malls and in many downtowns.

== Locations ==
In 1975, Ivey's had 20 stores in the following locations:

Florida

- Clearwater
- Pinellas Park
- Daytona Beach
- Jacksonville
- Merritt Island
- Orange Park
- Orlando
- Winter Park

North Carolina

- Asheville
- Chapel Hill
- Charlotte
- Gastonia
- Greensboro
- Raleigh

South Carolina

- Greenville
