= Harris Teeter =

American supermarket chain

Harris Teeter Supermarkets, LLC.
- Logo used since 2023

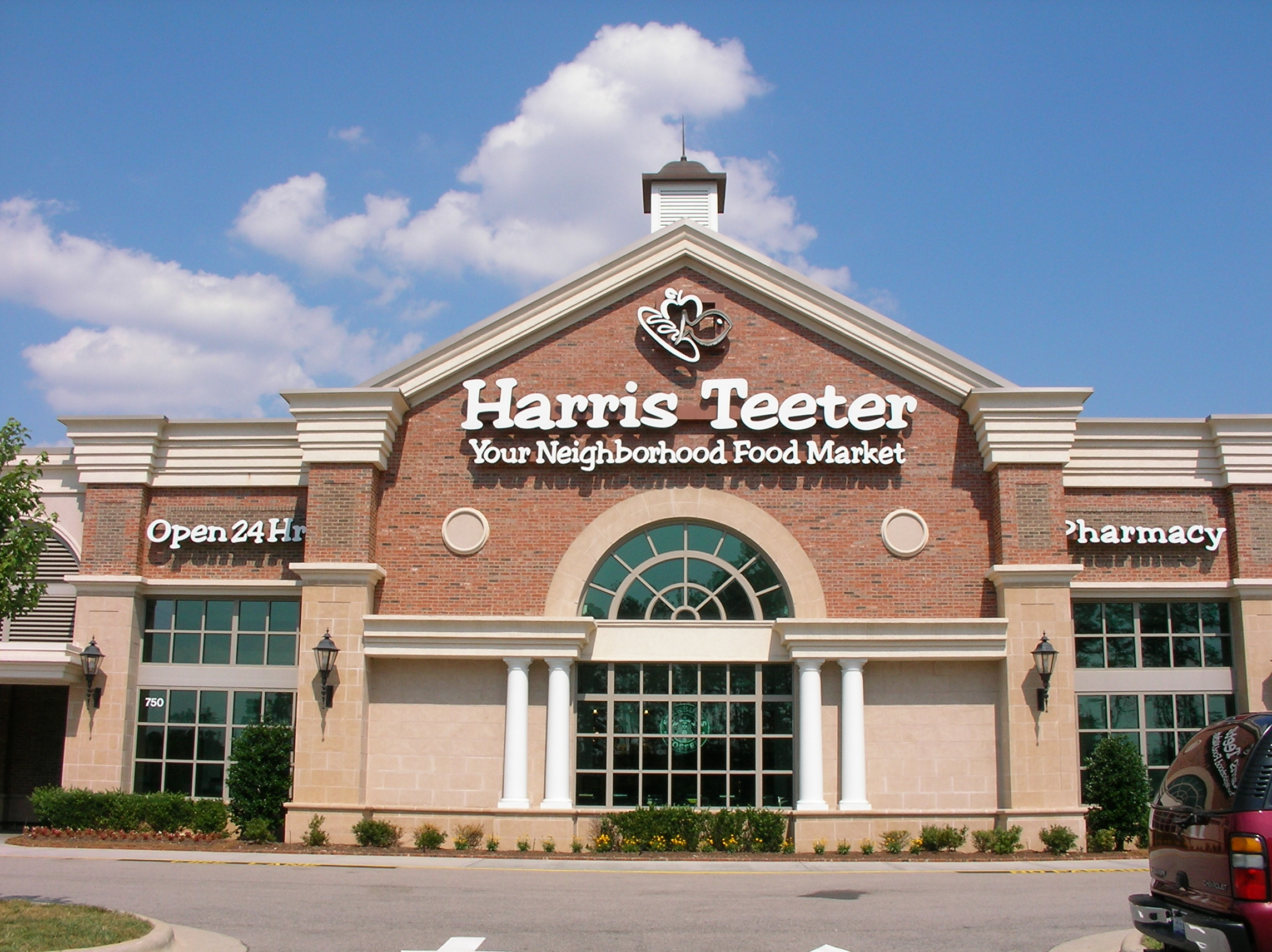
- A Harris Teeter storefront in Apex, North Carolina
- Trade name: Harris Teeter Neighborhood Food & Pharmacy
- Type: Subsidiary
- Industry: Supermarket
- Founded: Harris Super Market: 1936; 90 years ago Charlotte, North Carolina; Teeters Food Mart: 1939; 87 years ago Mooresville, North Carolina; Harris Teeter: February 1, 1960; 66 years ago Kannapolis, North Carolina
- Founder: William Thomas Harris; Willis L. Teeter
- Headquarters: Matthews, North Carolina
- Number of locations: 262 stores
- Area served: Delaware, North Carolina, Virginia, Georgia, South Carolina, Florida, Maryland and Washington, D.C.
- Key people: Tammy DeBoer (president)
- Products: Bakery, dairy, deli, frozen foods, grocery, meat, pharmacy, produce, seafood, snacks and flowers
- Revenue: US$4.54 billion (2012)
- Number of employees: 35,000
- Parent: The Ruddick Corporation (1969–2013); Kroger (2014–present)
- Website: www.harristeeter.com

Harris Teeter Supermarkets, LLC., also known as Harris Teeter Neighborhood Food & Pharmacy, is an American supermarket chain based in Matthews, North Carolina, a suburb of Charlotte. As of January 2025, the chain operates 262 stores in seven states (North Carolina, South Carolina, Virginia, Georgia, Florida, Delaware, Maryland) and Washington, D.C. Supermarket News ranked Harris Teeter No. 34 in the 2012 "Top 75 Retailers & Wholesalers" based on 2011 fiscal year sales of $4.3 billion.

On July 9, 2013, Harris Teeter Supermarkets announced that it was being acquired by The Kroger Company for $2.5 billion. The sale closed on January 28, 2014, though the company retained its name, brand, and headquarters in Matthews. On February 1, 2022, Harris Teeter named Tammy DeBoer as the company's president.

== History ==
=== Founding and early days ===
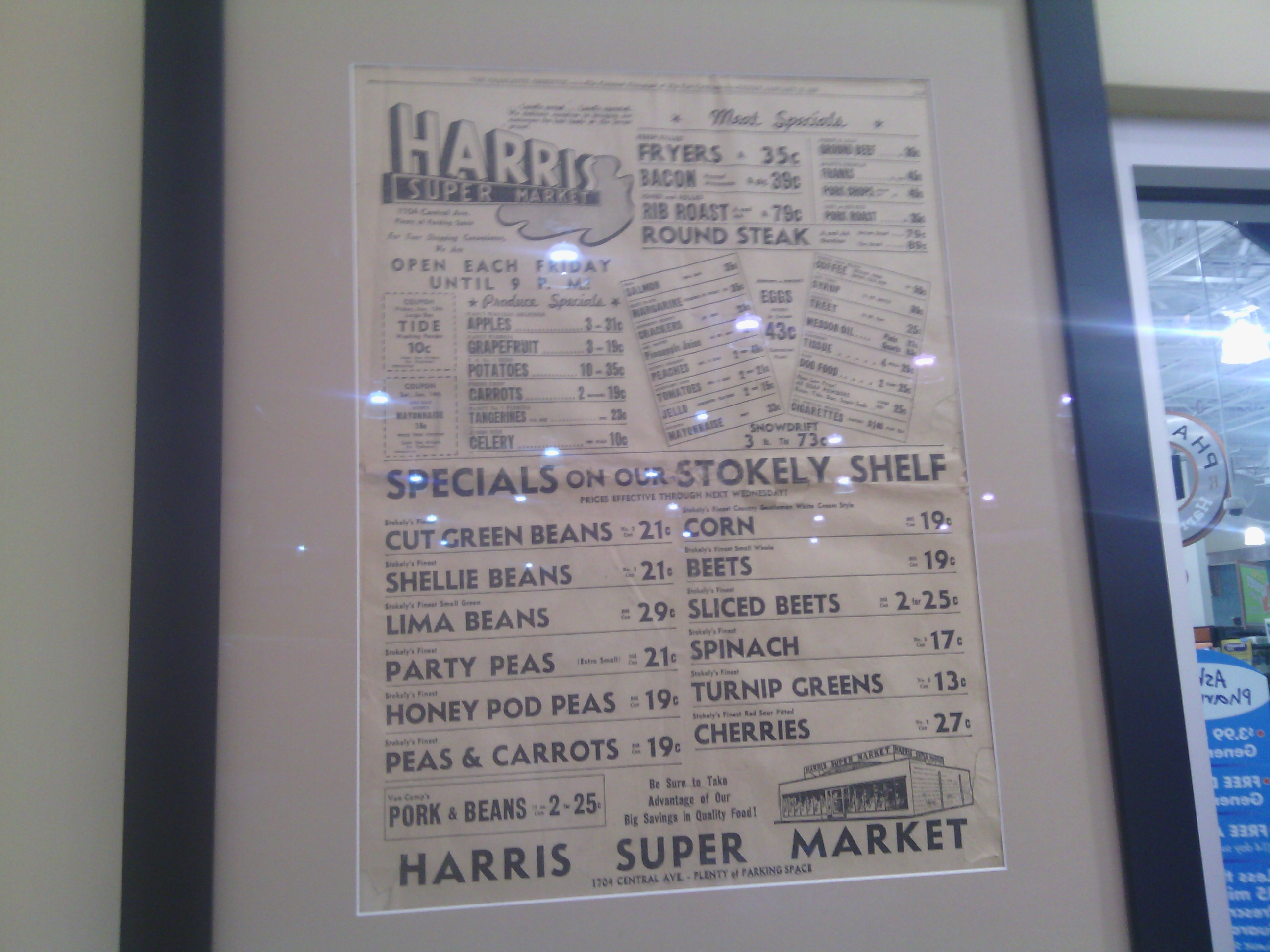
A 1950 ad for Harris Supermarkets. Displayed at Harris Teeter's store on Central Avenue in Charlotte, North Carolina (Store #097-00401).

Harris Teeter was founded by William Thomas Harris and Willis L. Teeter, two entrepreneurs who started their separate businesses during the Great Depression in Charlotte, North Carolina. Harris opened a full-service drugstore called Harris Drugs and Teeter opened Teeters Food Mart, later merging their two ventures.

Harris, an employee of the A&P store on Central and Pecan Avenues – Charlotte's first supermarket – borrowed funds in 1936 to open the Harris Super Market at 1704 Central Avenue. The store had eight employees, primarily selling dry groceries because frozen foods and refrigeration did not become common until World War II. To the family and their employees, it was known as Store #1. This store, later known as Harris Teeter store #201, closed on June 5, 2012, and was replaced by the two-story store #401 on the same site, which opened on May 29, 2013.

Harris' store was the first in North Carolina to allow customers to select their own groceries off the shelves. Before this time, customers handed a shopping list to a clerk, who then selected the groceries for the customers. The store was also open until 9 p.m. on Fridays, at a time when most grocery stores closed their doors at 5 p.m. This was done to appeal to working families and to capture their grocery shopping after they were paid on Fridays. Later, the Harris Super Market was the first grocery store in Charlotte to add air conditioning.

Harris also ran his own dairy farm and sold products from his dairy in his stores. For his wife, LaVerne, the dairy products carried the brand name of Vernedale Farms. Harris pioneered the first dairy co‑op among local dairy farmers. After running the co-op for several years, he negotiated its sale to Pet Dairy.

Harris Super Markets began primarily as a family business. Most of Harris's brothers and sisters were employees, and brothers and brothers-in-law were store managers. His sister, Sarah, ran the accounting department and his wife's sister was Harris's personal secretary. His son, Donald Thomas Harris, began working for the company at eight years old by sweeping floors. As an adult, Donald suggested that Harris Teeter should carry more than just food products, and recommended the introduction of health and beauty aids, school supplies, bakeware, kitchen tools, and seasonal items (such as coolers in the summer). His father liked the idea and told Don that he should create and run that division of the company, which he did until his retirement in 1995. He was the last member of the family who worked for the company.

Harris was instrumental in the permanent placement of kindergartens in the South Carolina public school system, and supported the effort to turn Charleston College into what is known today as the College of Charleston.

In 1939, Willis L. Teeter, who also worked for A&P at its Mooresville, North Carolina store, with his brother Paul, who was also working for A&P, borrowed $1,700 to open Teeter's Food Mart on Main Street in Mooresville. A&P was closing its doors in Mooresville and agreed to lease the location to the Teeter brothers. The first Teeter Food Mart opened on July 15, 1939. Teeter's was a family-run operation. Teeter was the manager, Paul (Bill), his brother was the produce manager, and Teeter's wife, Sylvia, also worked at the store. Paul's wife, Mildred, later joined the staff as a bookkeeper as the Teeter stores expanded. The Teeter brothers believed in exceptional customer service, even having home delivery service. Because of their standards of providing great customer service and only the best products, they saw sales rise quickly. Teeter based all he would do on the Golden Rule: Treat others as you would have them treat you.

In 1946, the Teeters moved from downtown to a larger location to keep up with demand. The Teeters were leaders in installing the first automated doors and check-outs in North Carolina. In July 1953, the Teeters opened their second store in Lincolnton, North Carolina. At this point the Teeters had become a household name. Lines of eager shoppers wrapped around the new store in anticipation of being one of the first customers in Teeters' second location. The Teeters' success continued to grow and by 1957 their third store opened in Newton, North Carolina, a fourth in Cornelius, a fifth in Hickory, and a sixth opened in Morganton, North Carolina, in November 1958.

After opening his sixth store Teeter joined the NC Food Dealers Association. At one of the Food Dealers meetings, Teeter met Harris. The two men decided that working together would increase the financial strength of the two supermarkets, allow them to grow more rapidly, and decrease operating costs. W. L. Teeter and W. T. Harris agreed to merge and did so in November 1959 to become Harris Teeter Supermarkets. The merger of 15 stores collectively became official in February 1960. The new company became the largest independent grocery organization in the Carolinas.

=== New ownership and 1980s expansion ===
Harris Teeter was purchased in 1969 by The Ruddick Corporation, owned and run by the Bourgeois-Dickson Family. The new owners introduced alcoholic beverages for sale for the first time. Harris, a devout Southern Baptist, had refused to allow the sale of alcohol, even after the merger.

In 1970, the chain introduced the Big M discount concept to compete with Colonial Stores Big Star discount chain and A&P's "WEO". Those stores were mainly in working-class neighborhoods, while middle and upper-class areas retained Harris Teeter. By 1976, the chain merged the two back to Harris Teeter/More Value and finally to just Harris Teeter again in 1979.

Harris Teeter's 1980 acquisition of the Hunter Farms dairy in High Point, North Carolina, enabled the company to substantially reduce dairy costs. Today, all Harris Teeter-brand and Hunter Farms-brand dairy products come from the Hunter dairy. Hunter also provides dairy products to companies and organizations not associated with Harris Teeter, including convenience stores, schools, Lowes Foods private label ice creams, and the Wendy's Frosty.

In 1984, Harris Teeter purchased several Food World stores in and around Greensboro. As part of the purchase, the company acquired a warehouse in the western part of Greensboro. This marked the first significant foray of the company outside its Charlotte base. Before this point, the company was a grocer in the vein of Piggly Wiggly, with a mix of stores in urban and rural areas. Since 1984, Harris Teeter has focused more on higher-income urban sites. This trend continued with HT's 1988 purchase of Big Star Supermarkets, giving it a foothold in the Raleigh-Durham market.

Ashcraft retired in 1986, and Edward Dunn took over as president of Harris Teeter in that year. During Dunn's watch, Harris Teeter began expansion outside North Carolina. The first expanded stores were in the northern part of South Carolina, near Charlotte. Later expansions led the company to Myrtle Beach, Charleston, and the Hampton Roads region of Virginia. The "Very Important Customer" program, popularly known as VIC, was introduced later in Dunn's tenure. This program was one of the first widespread loyalty card programs now popular throughout American grocery stores. The VIC program advertised "giveaways" such as turkeys for Thanksgiving, beach apparel for the summer, and gift cards to Harris Teeter stores.

In 1981, Harris Teeter was one of the first grocery chains to test plastic grocery bags. In 1985 the company added child-restraint belts to shopping carts. The chain's flagship store during the 1980s was in Charlotte's Cotswold neighborhood. It featured a waterfall and a fresh orange juice machine in the produce department, and for a brief period stocked fresh truffles that were flown in from France and priced at $300 a pound.

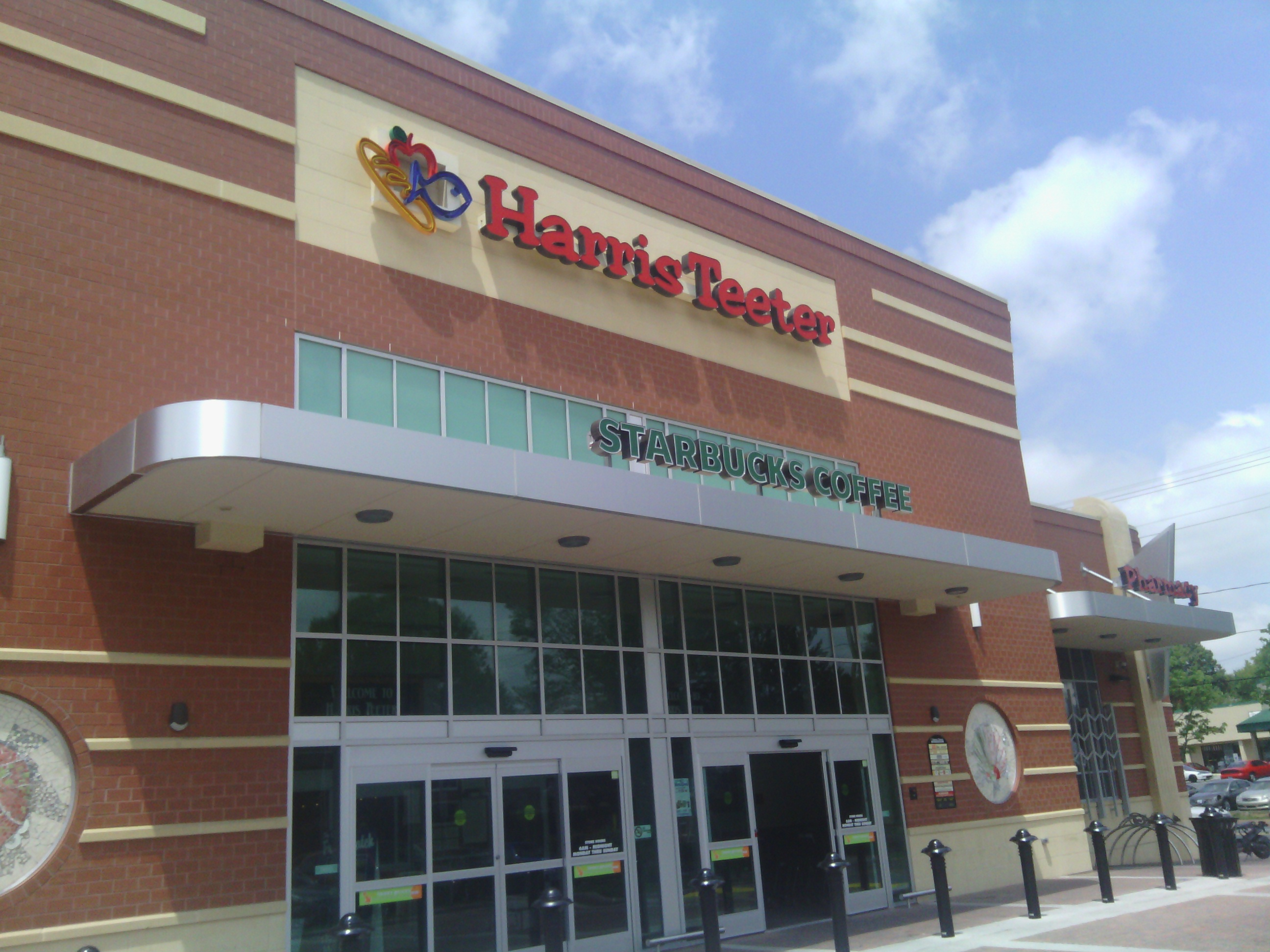
This Harris Teeter in Charlotte sits on the site of the original Harris Teeter, which was built in 1939 as Harris Supermarket and torn down in 2012 to make room for this larger store.

=== 1990s and 2000s: further expansion ===
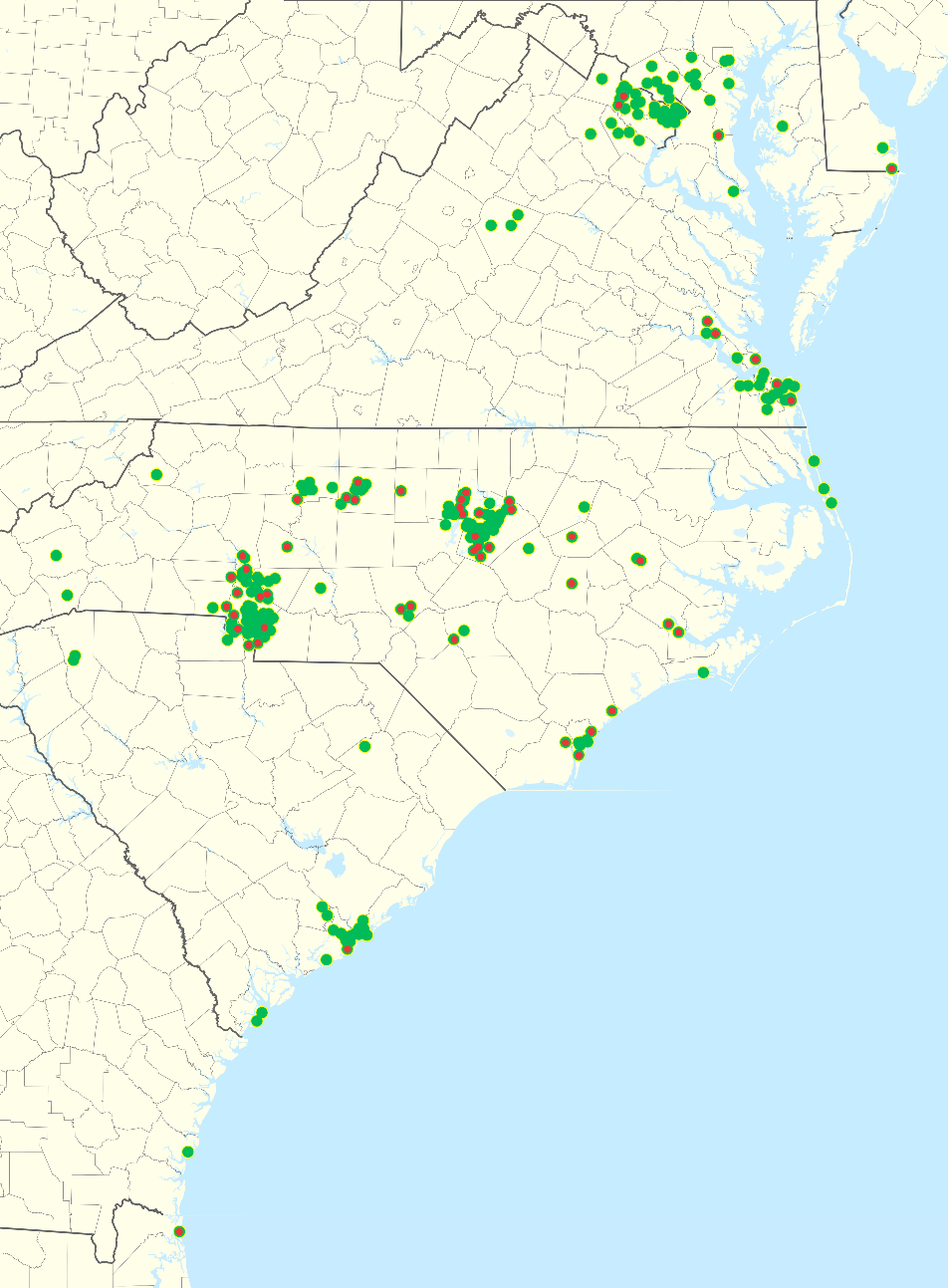
Map of Harris Teeter locations, as of December 2020 (supermarkets in green, fuel stations in red)

Fred Morganthall became president of Harris Teeter upon Dunn's retirement in 1997. Morganthall oversaw further expansion of the supermarket chain since taking over as company president. His first initial expansions moved Harris Teeter into Nashville, Tennessee; Atlanta, Georgia; and Jacksonville, Florida, which happened through the end of the 1990s.

Harris Teeter's expansion into Atlanta included 15 stores around the city and its suburbs. There were plans to further expand in Atlanta. However, these plans were only partially fulfilled and poorly executed, leading the chain to pull out of the Atlanta market altogether in 2001. Atlanta already had an established supermarket base with Publix and Kroger. Kroger quickly bought and reopened some of the former Atlanta Harris Teeter store spaces as Kroger stores, although remodeling these stores to Kroger's store floor plan and design took a few years.

Harris Teeter originally operated three stores in the greater Jacksonville area when the company expanded into that market in the late 1990s. However, only one store remains open serving Amelia Island/Fernandina Beach, and thus making it Harris Teeter's only Florida location, albeit just south of the Georgia border. The Mandarin area store closed in 2004. October 3, 2006, brought the closing of the Ponte Vedra Beach location.

Starting in the 2000s, Harris Teeter attempted to differentiate itself from its competitors by providing exceptional customer service and newly "branded" departments. The first department to be "branded" was the meat department, which in June 2002 began offering "Harris Teeter Rancher" beef. This was followed by the introductions of the Farmers' Market (produce department, October 2003), the Fisherman's Market (seafood department, April 2004), and the Fresh Foods Market (deli/bakery, January 2005). Gourmet imported items are sold under the "H.T. Traders" brand.

Harris Teeter stores are now separated into 3 regions and 20 districts. The Northern Region, based in Fairfax, Virginia, encompasses all stores in Virginia, Maryland, Delaware, and the northern coastal area of North Carolina. The Central Region, based in Raleigh, North Carolina, encompasses stores from Greensboro/High Point to Wilmington. The Southern Region, based in Charlotte, contains stores in southwestern North Carolina (from Winston-Salem to Asheville), as well as South Carolina, Georgia, and Florida.

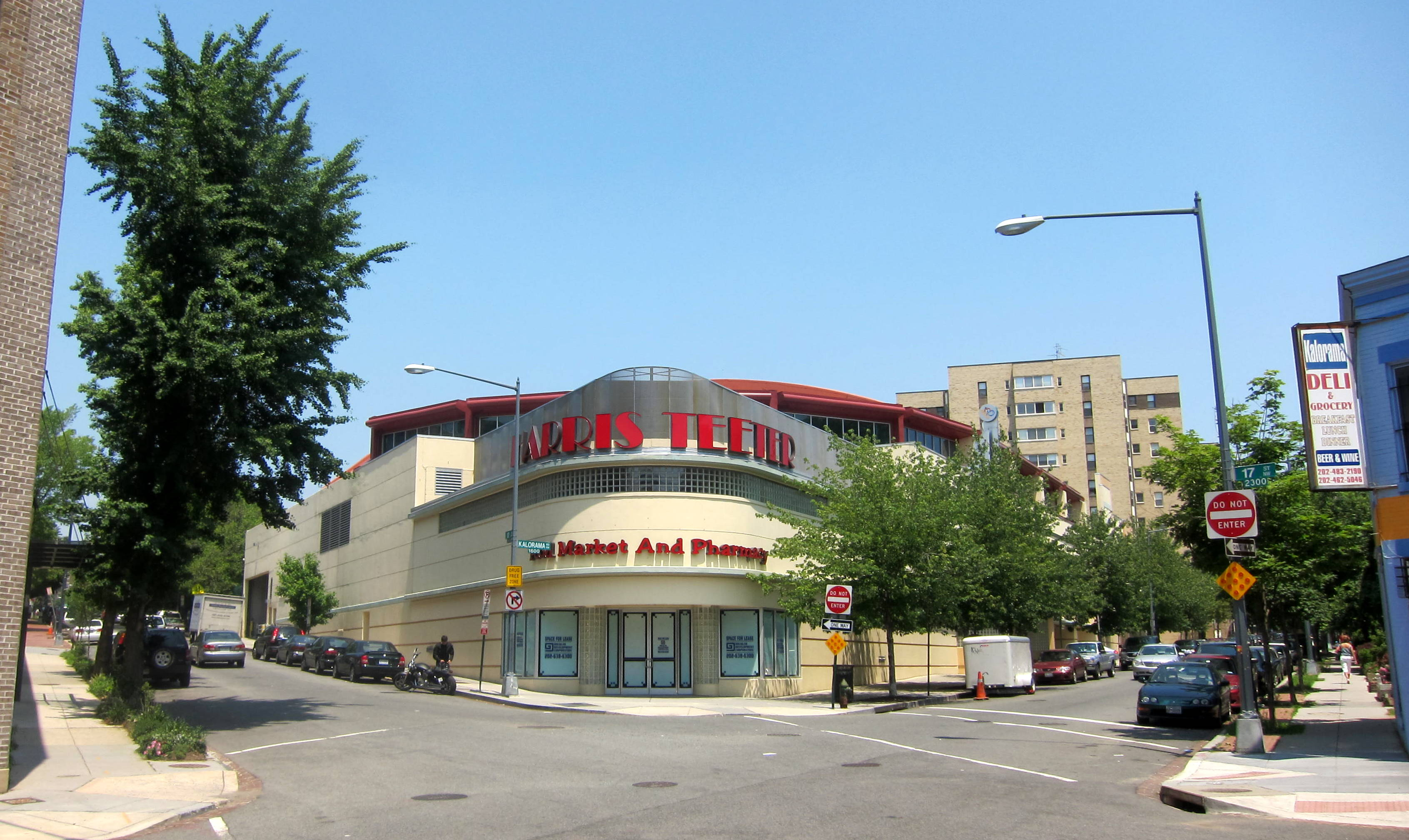
The first Harris Teeter in Washington, D.C., opened in 2008

As of August 2007, Harris Teeter had over 18,000 employees, and is the second largest supermarket chain in North Carolina, with Food Lion being number one.

By the mid to late 2000s, expansion to the Outer Banks of North Carolina had begun with stores in Corolla (May 2006), Kill Devil Hills (July 2006), and Morehead City (February 2009). The first store in Maryland opened in Darnestown on October 31, 2006; the second opened in May 2008 in Columbia's Village of Kings Contrivance, replacing the closed Safeway. The first store in Washington, D.C., opened in 2008.

Harris Teeter continues its shift into high-income urban areas. Most new stores opened in Morganthall's tenure conform to this pattern. Stores such as the original Harris Super Market, located near uptown Charlotte, remain grandfathered into the current system. With Harris Teeter's further expansion into the upscale markets, many of their older stores in lower income neighborhoods or small towns were being shut down as a result. One of Harris Teeter's oldest stores at Eastland Mall in Charlotte closed on June 22, 2006.

=== 2010 to today ===
The chain's expansion into Baltimore's Locust Point neighborhood was originally set for 2010, but was delayed due to "construction and financial problems". As of April 2014, Harris Teeter had eleven stores in Maryland, including the Locust Point location.

After selling its only other holding, American and Efird, Inc., Ruddick changed its name to Harris Teeter Supermarkets, Inc. in 2012. It had consolidated revenues of $4.3 billion for the fiscal year ended October 2, 2011 ("Fiscal 2011").

In June 2012, Harris Teeter announced the closure of six locations outside the Charlotte core, and its purchase of ten Lowes Foods stores in the Charlotte region. In turn, Lowes Foods would take the six Harris Teeter locations that would close and be compensated $26.5 million. Harris Teeter said this decision was based on focusing on larger, urbanized, and more upscale areas rather than rural, middle-market areas. In turn, Lowes Foods planned to shift to the western part of North Carolina, and away from Charlotte. However, industry analysts speculate that these changes are happening due to the impending expansion of Publix into the Charlotte market.

In 2012, Harris Teeter closed its stores in Asheville, Hickory, Shelby, Morganton, and two stores in Gastonia; the company had been established in these markets for at least the last half-century. The company returned to Asheville in 2013 with store #348 and Gastonia in 2016 with store #281. The newer Harris Teeter in Hendersonville, as well as the Boone location, did not close. They were retained as the only Harris Teeter stores in the western part of the Charlotte market. The Lowes Foods stores that became Harris Teeter were three stores in Charlotte, now two with the Hunter's Crossing store closing in 2018 (the Promenade store became a Fresh Market), and one in Cornelius, Davidson, Huntersville, Matthews (Stallings), Wesley Chapel, and Fort Mill, South Carolina. Lowes Foods stores in Harrisburg and Mooresville were retained.

The chain's largest store opened in winter 2018 at the New Bern Marketplace in New Bern, North Carolina, totaling up to 100,000 square feet. Harris Teeter also operates a number of prototype stores in their seven state layout. Some of these include a 78,200 square foot location in Greensboro, North Carolina, and a 78,000 square foot location in Charlotte.

A new upscale grocery store called 201central and owned by Harris Teeter opened two locations in two former Lowes Foods locations in Huntersville, North Carolina and Wesley Chapel, North Carolina, but the Huntersville store closed on February 3, 2018, with the Wesley Chapel store following on December 15, 2020. This announcement came shortly after upscale brand Whole Foods Market opened its first Charlotte store in late summer 2012 and before Publix announced its expansion into the Charlotte region.

In recent years, Harris Teeter has started a "Fuel Points" program whereby customers can earn discounts that can be used on gasoline purchases at Harris Teeter Fuel stations, which are adjacent to some Harris Teeter locations. Points are earned at a rate of 1 point per dollar spent (with promotions offering bonus points) with each 100 points corresponding to 10 cents off per gallon. Fuel Points can also be used at BP and Amoco stations in eligible areas.

Since 1992, the official mascot of Harris Teeter has been "Harry the Happy Dragon." Its slogan is "Your Neighborhood Food Market", although the older slogan "The Best Is What We're All About" still appears frequently in stores. An advertising campaign that debuted in 2004 features the slogan "My Harris Teeter", which is used as a jingle.

=== Kroger merger ===
It was announced on July 9, 2013, that Kroger would buy Harris Teeter for $2.4 billion in cash. The company became a subsidiary of Kroger and continued to operate under the Harris Teeter brand. The merger closed on January 29, 2014, upon which chairman Thomas Dickson announced his retirement. The deal represented a return of sorts to the Charlotte market for Kroger. It had previously operated stores under its own moniker in Charlotte from 1977 to 1988. It also allowed Kroger to enter the Asheville region. Charlotte and Asheville had been the only large markets in the Carolinas where Kroger had no presence.

In June 2015, Harris Teeter exited the crowded Nashville market, where its growth was stunted by aggressive competition from Publix (which expanded into the area around the same time as Harris Teeter), as well as other specialty grocers such as Trader Joe's, The Fresh Market, and Whole Foods, which all opened stores in the proximity of Harris Teeter locations. Kroger has traditionally had a market-leading presence in Nashville, and initially promised to keep the Harris Teeter stores open after the acquisition, But later, Kroger said the market "did not support Harris Teeter's future business plans." Harris Teeter closed one Nashville-area store soon after opening in the early-2000s, but five survived into 2015. The first of those closed in February, another was permanently closed in June, and the remaining three were converted to Kroger stores by 2016 (one of which replaced a nearby existing Kroger store).

== Gallery ==
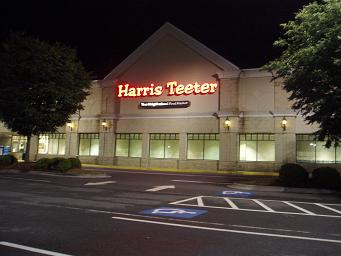
Store in Charlotte, North Carolina

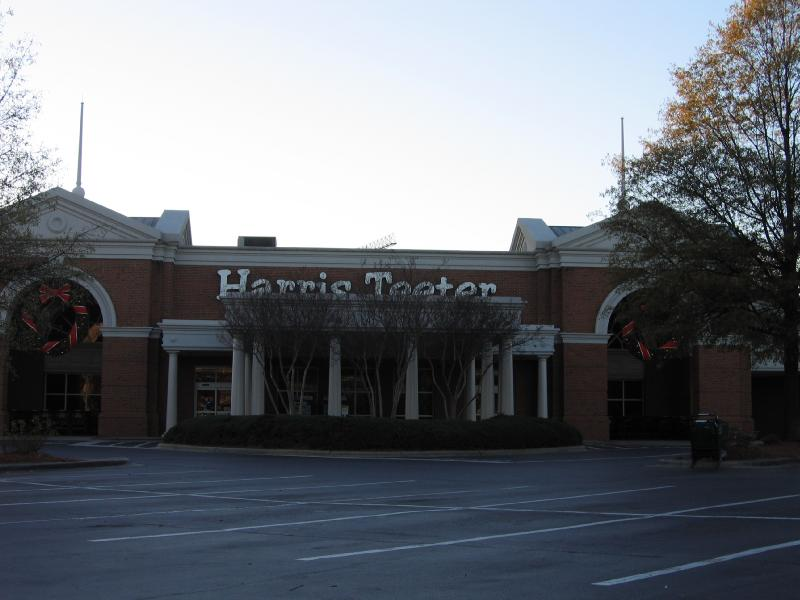
Flagship store in Charlotte, North Carolina

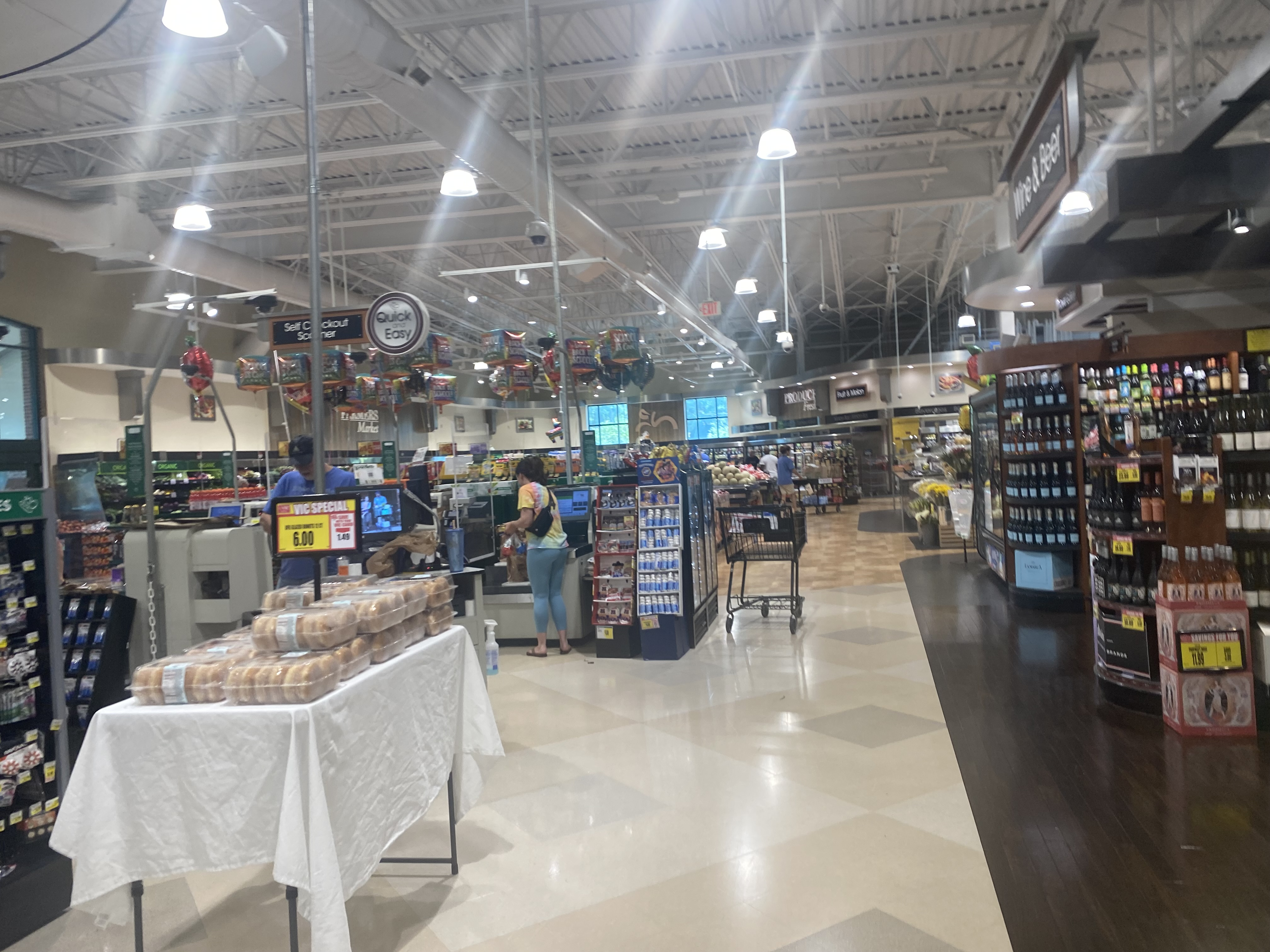
Interior of a Harris Teeter in Summerville, South Carolina

Logo used until early 2023
