= List of Charlotte Area Transit System bus routes =

== Route designations ==
- 1–89 – local routes in various areas of the city
- 40X–88X – express routes (specifically designated with an X) from uptown to various park and ride lots
- 90–99 – Circulator routes in North Mecklenburg (and formerly Matthews/Mint Hill) that will deviate for pick ups up to 3/4 of a mile from the route with advanced notice.
- 200–299 – community circulator routes
- 501 – LYNX Blue Line (though not generally listed for users)
- 510 – CityLYNX Gold Line (though not generally listed for users)

== List of routes ==
Route Name	Terminal 1	Terminal 2	Via	Notes & History
1 Mt. Holly Road	Center City; Charlotte Transportation Center	Mountain Island; Callabridge Commons	Rozzelles Ferry Road, Old Mt. Holly Road	
2 Ashley/Scaleybark Crosstown	York Road; Scaleybark station	Thomasboro-Hoskins; Thriftwood Drive & Freedom Drive	Remount Road, Ashley Road	Was 2 Ashley Park until major rerouting on October 1, 2018, creating this route.
3 The Plaza	Oakview Terrace; Centre Street & Tennessee Avenue	Hickory Ridge; Lawyers Road Park & Ride	The Plaza, W.T. Harris Boulevard	
4 Belmont	Center City; Charlotte Transportation Center	NoDa; Sugar Creek station	The Plaza	Was 4 Country Club until the extension on March 19, 2018, creating this route.
5 Airport	Center City; Charlotte Transportation Center	Charlotte-Douglas International Airport	Morehead Street, Wilkinson Boulevard	Created on September 5, 1988; discontinued September 3, 1993 due to low ridership; service resumed June 1, 1998.
6 Kings Drive	Center City; Charlotte Transportation Center	Dilworth; Scott Avenue & Blythe Boulevard	Kings Drive	
7 Beatties Ford	Center City; Charlotte Transportation Center	Wedgewood; Harris Corners Parkway & Maple View Lane	Beatties Ford Road, Statesville Road	Trips alternate between each branch
7 Beatties Ford	Center City; Charlotte Transportation Center	Wedgewood; Northlake Mall	Beatties Ford Road	Trips alternate between each branch
8 Tuckaseegee Road	Center City; Charlotte Transportation Center	West Charlotte; Scott Futrell Drive & Little Rock Road	Tuckaseegee Road	
9 Central Avenue	Center City; Charlotte Transportation Center	Hickory Ridge; Lawyers Road Park & Ride	Central Avenue	Created on September 5, 1988; Formerly Charlotte Transit route 10.
10 West Boulevard	Center City; Charlotte Transportation Center	Renaissance West; New Renaissance Way & Burnette Avenue via Central Piedmont Community College Harris Campus	West Boulevard	
11 North Tryon	Center City; Charlotte Transportation Center	Mineral Springs/Rumple Road; Walmart University Pointe	Tryon Street (North)	Select trips serve Charlotte station
12 South Boulevard	Clanton Park/Roseland; Rose Thorn Place & Pressley Road (Pressley Ridge Apartments)	Sterling; I-485/South Boulevard station	South Boulevard	
13 Nevin Road	NoDa; Sugar Creek station	Firestone-Garden Park; Milan Road East & Braden Drive	Craighead Road, Cindy Lane	
14 Providence Road	Center City; Charlotte Transportation Center	Raintree; Arboretum Shopping Center	Providence Road	Formerly Charlotte Transit route 1 (Providence).
15 Randolph Road	Center City; Charlotte Transportation Center	Cotswold; Colwick Road & Greenwich Road (Cotswold Shopping Center)	Randolph Road	Formerly Charlotte Transit route 1 (Randolph).
16 South Tryon	Center City; Charlotte Transportation Center	Steele Creek; Charlotte Medical Clinic Steelecroft	Tryon Street (South)	
17 Commonwealth Avenue	Center City; Charlotte Transportation Center	Matthews; Matthews-Independence Point Park & Ride	Central Avenue, Commonwealth Avenue, Independence Boulevard	No stops along Independence Boulevard from Sharon Amity Road to W.T. Harris Boulevard; Formerly Charlotte Transit route 2 Independence Boulevard.
18 Paw Creek/Rosa Parks Crosstown	Firestone-Garden Park; Rosa Parks Place Community Transit Center	Mountain Island; Callabridge Commons	Hoskins Road, Mt. Holly Road, Mt. Holly-Huntersville Road	Formerly part of routes 1 and 34.
19 Park Road	Center City; Charlotte Transportation Center	Barclay Downs; Southpark Community Transit Center	Park Road	Trips alternate between each branch; Formerly Charlotte Transit route 4.
19 Park Road	Center City; Charlotte Transportation Center	Pineville; Carolina Place Mall	Park Road	Trips alternate between each branch; Formerly Charlotte Transit route 4.
20 Sharon Road	Center City; Charlotte Transportation Center	Park Crossing; Hamlin Park Drive & Brandon Forest Drive (Quail Corners)	Sharon Road	No Sunday service; Extension of former 20 Queens Road; extended south to replace part of the 66X Sharon Road Express.
21 Statesville Avenue	Center City; Charlotte Transportation Center	West Sugar Creek; Sugar Creek Road @ Food Lion	Statesville Avenue/Road, Old Statesville Road	Formerly 21 Double Oaks.
22 Graham Street	Center City; Charlotte Transportation Center	University City; JW Clay Boulevard/UNC Charlotte station	Graham Street, Mallard Creek Road, W.T. Harris Boulevard	Formerly Charlotte Transit route 12.
23 Shamrock Drive	Center City; Charlotte Transportation Center	Eastway; Equitable Place & Grier Road	North Davidson Street, Shamrock Drive	All weekday early morning, weekday late night and early morning Saturday trips originate at Central Piedmont Community College Northeast Campus
24 Nations Ford Road	Madison Park; Woodlawn station	Montclaire South; Arrowood station	Nations Ford Road	Formerly route 24 Windsong Trails.
26 Oaklawn Avenue	Center City; Charlotte Transportation Center	Firestone-Garden Park; Rosa Parks Place Community Transit Center	Oaklawn Avenue	Formerly Charlotte Transit route 6.
27 Monroe Road	Center City; Charlotte Transportation Center	Matthews; Matthews-Mint Hill Road & Crestdale Road near Novant Health Matthews Medical Center	East 7th Street/Monroe Road	Formerly Charlotte Transit route 7.
28 Fairview Road	Barclay Downs; Southpark Community Transit Center	Eastland-Wilora Lake; Eastland Community Transit Center	Fairview Road, Sharon Amity Road	No Sunday service; Formerly part of route 29.
29 UNCC/JW Clay	Oakhurst; Walmart Independence	University City; JW Clay Boulevard/UNC Charlotte station	Sharon Amity Road, Barrington Drive	Was 29 UNC Charlotte/SouthPark until major rerouting on March 19, 2018.; Late evening trips only run between Mary Alexander Road and JW Clay Boulevard/UNC Charlotte station
30 Woodlawn/Scaleybark/Crosstown	Westerly Hills; Carrowmore Place & Thornton Road near Harding University High School	Barclay Downs; Southpark Community Transit Center	Clanton Road, Scaleybark Road	No Sunday service
34 Freedom Drive	Center City; Charlotte Transportation Center	Paw Creek; Freedom Drive & Old Little Rock Road (Paw Creek Shopping Center)	Freedom Drive	
35 Wilkinson-Amazon	Center City; Charlotte Transportation Center	Harbor House; Amazon Distribution Center Belmont	Morehead Street, Wilkinson Avenue	Select trips originate/terminate at Amazon Distribution Center Tuckaseegee
39 Eastway	Eastway; Old Concord Road station	Grier Heights; Billingsley Road & Randolph Road	Eastway Drive/Wendover Road	
40x Lawyers Road Express	Center City; Johnson & Wales University Charlotte	Mint Hill; Mint Hill Festival Shopping Center	Independence Boulevard, Albemarle Road, Lawyers Road	Rush hour peak direction service; Replaced 40X Albemarle Road Express on June 3, 2013.
41x Steele Creek Express	Center City; 3rd Street & McDowell Street (last stop inbound); 4th Street & McDowell Street (first stop outbound)	Steele Creek; Charlotte Medical Clinic Steelecroft	General Paul R. Younts Expressway, South Tryon Street	Rush hour peak direction service; Replaced 41X Arrowood Road Express.
42 Carowinds	Sterling; I-485/South Boulevard station	Yorkshire; Southpoint Business Park	South Boulevard/Pineville Road/Polk Street, Carowinds Boulevard	Rush hour reverse peak direction service; Part of route travels through South Carolina; Renaming of 42X Carowinds Express.
43 Ballantyne	Montclaire South; Sharon Road West station	Ballantyne; Ballantyne Corporate Place & Ballantyne Commons Parkway	Sharon Road West, Park Road, Johnston Road	No Sunday service; Replacing part of route 66X Sharon Express.
46x Harrisburg Road Express	Center City; Johnson & Wales University Charlotte	Silverwood; Cambridge Commons Park & Ride	Independence Boulevard, Albemarle Road, Harrisburg Road	Rush hour peak direction service
48x MetroRapid Northcross Express	Center City; Fourth & McDowell streets	Huntersville; Northcross Park & Ride	Statesville Avenue (NB), Bill Lee Freeway	No off-peak service; Created on February 2, 2020, pairing with the new 63X Express Route.
50 URP/CIC	Mineral Springs/Rumple Road; University City Boulevard station	Prosperity Church Road; Mallard Creek Park & Ride	IBM Drive, Mallard Creek Road	Towards Mallard Creek P&R AM, to University City Bl Sta PM; No off-peak service
51 Pineville-Matthews Road	Matthews; Matthews-Independence Point Park & Ride	Pineville; Carolina Place Mall	Pineville-Matthews Road	Select school day trips serve Central Piedmont Community College Lepine; No Sunday service
51 Pineville-Matthews Road	Matthews; CPCC Lepine	Pineville; Carolina Place Mall	Pineville-Matthews Road	Select school day trips serve Central Piedmont Community College Lepine; No Sunday service
52x Idlewild Road Express	Center City; Johnson & Wales University Charlotte	Marshbrooke; Mintworth Avenue & Margaret Wallace Road	Independence Freeway, Idlewild Road	Rush hour peak direction service; Replaced 51X Idlewild Road Express.
53x MetroRapid Northlake Express	Center City; 3rd Street & McDowell Street (last stop inbound); 4th Street & McDowell Street (first stop outbound)	Highland Creek; Hope Church via Ridge Road Park & Ride	Bill Lee Freeway, Charlotte Beltway	No off-peak service; AM Southbound trips run from Ridge Road P & R to 3rd & McDowell, PM Southbound trips run from Hope Church to Charlotte TC; Select NB trips terminate at Ridge Road P & R
54 University Research Park	Mineral Springs/Rumple Road; University City Boulevard station	Prosperity Church Road; Mallard Creek Park & Ride		Select rush hour peak direction trips
54 University Research Park	Mineral Springs/Rumple Road; University City Boulevard station	Concord; Concord Mills	Mallard Creek Road	No Sunday service; Formerly 54X with route changes.
55 Westinghouse	Montclaire South; Sharon Road West station	Steele Creek; Charlotte Premium Outlets	Westinghouse Boulevard, Steele Creek Road	Replacing part of route 102 Arrowood Shuttle.
56 Arrowood	Montclaire South; Arrowood station	Steele Creek; Charlotte Premium Outlets	Arrowood Road	Replacing part of route 102 Arrowood Shuttle.
57 Archdale/South Park	Barclay Downs; Southpark Community Transit Center	Forest Park; Forest Point Circle & Forest Point Boulevard	Archdale Drive, Forest Point Boulevard	
58 Pineville	Sterling; I-485/South Boulevard station	Pineville; Carolina Place Mall	South Boulevard/Polk Street	Replacing part of route 66X Sharon Express.
59 North Meck Connector	Huntersville; Walmart Huntersville	University City; JW Clay Boulevard/UNC Charlotte station	Prosperity Church Road/Mallard Creek Church Road	No Sunday service; Formerly part of route 22.
60 Tyvola Road	Montclair South; Tyvola station	Charlotte-Douglas International Airport	Tyvola Road, Billy Graham Parkway	Early morning, evening and late evening trips via V.A. Hospital; Replaced part of route 10 on November 26, 2007.
60 Tyvola Road	Montclair South; Tyvola station	Charlotte-Douglas International Airport	Tyvola Road, Billy Graham Parkway	Daytime trips via LakePointe Corporate Center; Replaced part of route 10 on November 26, 2007.
61x Arboretum Express	Center City; Johnson & Wales University Charlotte	Providence Estates East; Waverly Park & Ride	Randolph Road (NB), Providence Road	Rush hour peak direction service; Created as 61X Providence Square Express.
62x Rea Road Express	Center City; Johnson & Wales University Charlotte	Piper Glen; Elm Lane & Williams Pond Lane (St. Matthew Church Park and Ride)	Providence Road, Colony Road, Rea Road	No reverse-peak service west of Charlotte TC; No off-peak service
63x MetroRapid Huntersville Express	Center City; 3rd Street & McDowell Street (last stop inbound); 4th Street & McDowell Street (first stop outbound)	Huntersville; Huntersville Gateway Park & Ride	Bill Lee Freeway	Reverse peak trips run via Gilead Road and Reese Boulevard; AM trips start at CTC; No off-peak service; Created on February 2, 2020, pairing with the new 48X Express Route.
64x Independence Boulevard Express	Center City; Johnson & Wales University Charlotte	Matthews; John Street & Ames Road	Independence Boulevard	Rush hour peak direction service
74x Union County Express	Center City; Johnson & Wales University Charlotte	Indian Trail; Union Towne Center	Independence Boulevard	No off-peak service; No reverse peak service west of Charlotte TC
77x MetroRapid North Mecklenburg Express	Center City; 3rd Street & McDowell Street (last stop inbound); 4th Street & McDowell Street (first stop outbound)	Davidson; Davidson Gateway Drive & Griffith Street	Bill Lee Freeway	No off-peak service; AM northbound trips originate at Charlotte TC, running nonstop between Davidson Gateway and Center City
85x Gastonia Express	Center City; 3rd Street & McDowell Street (last stop inbound); 4th Street & McDowell Street (first stop outbound)	Gastonia; Oakland Street & Main Avenue	Senator Marshall Arthur Rauch Highway	No off-peak service; No AM reverse peak service, PM eastbound trips end at Charlotte TC
88x Mountain Island Express	Center City; 3rd Street & McDowell Street (last stop inbound); 4th Street & McDowell Street (first stop outbound)	Mountain Island; Riverbend Park & Ride	Brookshire Boulevard	Rush hour peak direction service; Formerly 88X Lincoln County Express.
211 Hidden Valley	NoDa; Sugar Creek station	Hidden Valley; Tom Hunter station	Sugar Creek Road, Tom Hunter Road (EB)	
221 E. Harris Boulevard-Idlewild Road	Eastland-Wilora Lake; Eastland Community Transit Center	Oakhurst; Walmart Independence	W.T. Harris Boulevard, Idlewild Road, Independence Boulevard	
222 Pence Road	Eastland-Wilora Lake; Eastland Community Transit Center	Becton Park; Circumferential Road & Trellis Point Boulevard (Target)	Hickory Grove Road/Pence Road	
235 Goodwill/Amay James	West Charlotte; Wilkinson Boulevard & Boyer Street (Goodwill Campus)	Reid Park; West Boulevard & Romare Bearden Drive	West Boulevard, Ashley Road, Scott Futrell Drive	235 Jackson Park until major rerouting on October 1, 2018, creating this route.
501 Light Rail/Lynx Blue Line	University City; UNC Charlotte-Main station	Sterling; I-485/South Boulevard station		Light rail service.
510 Streetcar/CityLYNX Gold Line	Biddleville; French Street station	Elizabeth; Sunnyside Avenue station		Streetcar service.

Route	Created	Notes
1 Mt. Holly Road		
2 Ashley/Scaleybark Crosstown		Was 2 Ashley Park until major rerouting on October 1, 2018, creating this route.
3 The Plaza		
4 Belmont		Was 4 Country Club until the extension on March 19, 2018, creating this route.
5 Airport	September 5, 1988	Discontinued September 3, 1993 due to low ridership; service resumed June 1, 1998.
6 Kings Drive		
7 Beatties Ford		
8 Tuckaseegee Road		
9 Central Avenue	September 5, 1988	Formerly Charlotte Transit route 10.
10 West Boulevard		
11 North Tryon		
12 South Boulevard		
13 Nevin Road		
14 Providence Road	September 5, 1988	Formerly Charlotte Transit route 1 (Providence).
15 Randolph Road	September 5, 1988	Formerly Charlotte Transit route 1 (Randolph).
16 South Tryon		
17 Commonwealth Avenue	September 5, 1988	Formerly Charlotte Transit route 2 Independence Boulevard.
18 Paw Creek/Rosa Parks Crosstown	October 1, 2018	Formerly part of routes 1 and 34.
19 Park Road	September 5, 1988	Formerly Charlotte Transit route 4.
20 Sharon Road	November 26, 2007	Extension of former 20 Queens Road; extended south to replace part of the 66X Sharon Road Express.
21 Statesville Ave	March 19, 2018	Formerly 21 Double Oaks.
22 Graham Street	September 5, 1988	Formerly Charlotte Transit route 12.
23 Shamrock Drive	September 3, 1990	
24 Nations Ford Road	November 26, 2007	Formerly route 24 Windsong Trails.
26 Oaklawn Avenue	September 5, 1988	Formerly Charlotte Transit route 6.
27 Monroe Road	September 5, 1988	Formerly Charlotte Transit route 7.
28 Fairview Road	March 19, 2018	Formerly part of route 29.
29 UNCC/JW Clay	March 19, 2018	Was 29 UNC Charlotte/SouthPark until major rerouting on March 19, 2018.
30 Woodlawn/Scaleybark Crosstown	September 5, 1988	
34 Freedom Drive	December 4, 2000	
35 Wilkinson-Amazon	February 4, 2019	
39 Eastway		
40X Lawyers Road Express	June 3, 2013	Replaced 40X Albemarle Road Express on June 3, 2013.
41X Steele Creek Express	November 26, 2007	Replaced 41X Arrowood Road Express.
42 Carowinds	November 26, 2007	Renaming of 42X Carowinds Express.
43 Ballantyne	November 26, 2007	Replacing part of route 66X Sharon Express.
46X Harrisburg Road Express	June 3, 2013	
47X Huntersville Greenhouse Express	March 19, 2018	
48X MetroRapid Northcross Express	February 2, 2020	Collaborating with the new 63X Express Route.
50 URP/CIC	March 19, 2018	
51 Pineville-Matthews Road	June 3, 2013	
52X Idlewild Road Express	June 3, 2013	Replaced 51X Idlewild Road Express.
53X MetroRapid Northlake Express	October 3, 2005	
54 University Research Park	March 19, 2018	Formerly 54X with route changes.
55 Westinghouse	November 26, 2007	Replacing part of route 102 Arrowood Shuttle.
56 Arrowood	November 26, 2007	Replacing part of route 102 Arrowood Shuttle.
57 Archdale/SouthPark	November 26, 2007	
58 Pineville	November 26, 2007	Replacing part of route 66X Sharon Express.
59 North Meck Connector	March 19, 2018	Formerly part of route 22.
60 Tyvola Road	November 26, 2007	Replacing part of route 10.
61X Arboretum Express	February 27, 1978	Created as 61X Providence Square Express.
62X Rea Road Express	September 3, 1990	
63X MetroRapid Huntersville Express	February 3, 2020	Collaborating with the 48x.
64X Independence Blvd Express		
74X Union County Express	June 2, 2003	
77X MetroRapid North Mecklenburg Express	October 4, 1999	
85X Gastonia Express	March 5, 2001	
88X Mountain Island Express	June 30, 2010	Formerly 88X Lincoln County Express.
211 Hidden Valley		
221 E. Harris Blvd-Idlewild Rd	September 27, 2002	
222 Pence Road	June 7, 2004	
235 Goodwill/Amay James		235 Jackson Park until major rerouting on October 1, 2018, creating this route.
501 Light Rail/Lynx Blue Line	November 26, 2007	Light rail service.
510 Streetcar/CityLYNX Gold Line	August 30, 2021	Streetcar

== Former routes ==
Route	Created	Discontinued	Notes
18 Selwyn Avenue	September 5, 1988	June 3, 2013	Formerly Charlotte Transit route 3 Selwyn. Discontinued due to low ridership.
20 Queens Road	September 5, 1988	November 26, 2007	Formerly Charlotte Transit route 8 Queens Road. Became 20 Sharon Road.
21 Double Oaks	September 5, 1988	March 19, 2018	Charlotte Transit route 16 Double Oaks before September 5, 1988, then 21 Double Oaks. Became 21 Statesville Avenue after major rerouting.
24 Windsong Trails	September 3, 1990	November 26, 2007	Renamed Route 24 Nations Ford Road.
25 Westside		December 3, 2001	Partially replaced by rerouted route 24.
25 Clanton-Midtown	June 7, 2004	October 1, 2018	Replaced by other routes.
28 McAlway Road	September 5, 1988	February 5, 2007	Formerly Charlotte Transit route 7 McAlway Road. Consolidated into route 15.
29 UNCC/SouthPark	March 3, 1980	March 19, 2018.	Became 29 UNCC/JW Clay after rerouting.
31 Southside Crosstown	January 3, 1994	November 26, 2007	Replaced by extension of route 30.
32 CPCC Southwest Campus		June 5, 2000	Partially replaced by rerouted route 41X.
33 North Meck Connector	June 2000	October 6, 2003	Discontinued due to low ridership.
35 The Loop	January 3, 1994	1999	
36 Midtown	November 26, 2007	March 2, 2009	Created to replace route 236; partially replaced by routes 12 and 25.
40X Albemarle Road Express	June 4, 1979	June 3, 2013	Split into 40X Lawyers Road Express and 46X Harrisburg Express.
41X Arrowood Road Express		November 26, 2007	Renamed 41X Steele Creek Express and partly replaced by route 44 Fort Mill.
42X Carowinds Express	April 2, 2003	November 26, 2007	Became 42 Carowinds Blvd.
44 Fort Mill	November 26, 2007	March 5, 2012	Replaced part of route 41X Arrowood Road Express; partially replaced by route 42.
45X Carmel Road Express	August 20, 1979	October 1, 2018	Partially replaced by route 62X and route 5.
47 UNCC Yellow Line	fall 2006	August 28, 2017	Created as 47 Nugget; renamed 47 UNCC Yellow Line in fall 2011; turned over to Academy Bus on August 28, 2017.
47X Hunterspoint-Greenhouse Express	March 29, 2018	July 7, 2025	Discontinued due to low ridership
48X Huntersville Express	June 5, 2006	February 3, 2020	Renamed 48x MetroRapid Northcross Express on February 3, 2020, collaborating with the new 63x Huntersville Express.
49 Niner	fall 2006	August 24, 2009	
49 UNCC Green Line	fall 2011	August 28, 2017	Turned over to Academy Bus on August 28, 2017.
50X Pawtuckett Express	August 20, 1979	February 28, 1983	Later renamed Freedom Drive Express.
50 UNCC Red Line	fall 2006	August 28, 2017	Created as 50 C.R.I. Shuttle; renamed 50 the Gold Streak on August 24, 2009, and to 50 UNCC Red Line in fall 2011; turned over to Academy Bus on August 28, 2017.
51X Idlewild Road Express	December 1, 1980	June 3, 2013	Renumbered 52X Idlewild Road Express with fewer stops.
52X Sardis Road Express		September 3, 1993	
53X Lawyers Road Express	September 5, 1988	September 3, 1993	Replaced by extension of 40X Albemarle Road Express.
54X Harris Boulevard Express	April 4, 1988	March 19, 2018	Briefly discontinued from September 3, 1993, then later reinstated. Became 54 University Research Park with route changes.
55X Wilkinson Blvd Express	September 3, 1990	by late 1999	
59 Scaleybark/Marsh	November 26, 2007	March 2, 2009	Replaced part of route 19 Park Road; discontinued due to low ridership.
65X Matthews Express	August 20, 1979	March 25, 2020	Discontinued due to low ridership amongst the COVID-19 pandemic.
66X Sharon Express	June 4, 1979	November 26, 2007	Replaced by extensions of route 19, 20, and routes 43 and 58.
72X Tom Hunter Express	August 20, 1979	February 28, 1983	Replaced by extension of route 11 Hidden Valley.
74 Uni-Park Rider		July 1, 2003	
78 Matthews Village Rider	October 29, 2001	October 6, 2003	
78X Celanese Express	June 25, 2010	July 4, 2011	Discontinued due to financial constraints.
79 Matthews Village Rider	October 29, 2001	October 6, 2003	
79X Concord Mills Mall	May 30, 2010	June 3, 2013	Discontinued due to financial constraints and low ridership.
80X Concord Express	May 30, 2010	March 19, 2018	Replaced by Concord Charlotte Express operated by both agencies.
81X Wachovia Express Shuttle	May 30, 2010	October 4, 2010	Discontinued due to financial constraints.
82X Rock Hill Express	October 29, 2001	June 30, 2026	Discontinued due to failure of contract renewal with Rock Hill.
83X Mooresville Express	October 29, 2001	December 31, 2010	Discontinued due to financial constraints.
84 Gold Rush Orange Line	September 2001	July 1, 2013	
86 Gold Rush Red Line	September 2001	August 14, 2017	
87 Gold Rush Blue Line	September 2001	between January 2006 and October 2007	
87 CityLynx Connector	June 3, 2019	August 30, 2021	Temporary rail replacement bus service; discontinued when Phase 2 of the CityLynx Gold Line opens.
88X Lincoln County Express	June 7, 2004	June 30, 2010	Lincoln County service discontinued due to financial constraints; route limited to Mecklenburg County, becoming 88X Mountain Island Express.
89 South End Shuttle		spring 2008	Discontinued due to low ridership.
91 First Ward Shuttle		March 2, 2009	Discontinued due to low ridership.
94 Mint Hill-Matthews Shuttle	June 6, 2011	June 3, 2013	Discontinued due to low ridership.
96 Village Rider-Davidson		March 2, 2009	Discontinued due to low ridership; service to Ada Jenkins Center replaced by an extended route 97.
97 Village Rider-Cornelius	October 29, 2001	July 7, 2025	Replaced by CATS Micro
98 Village Rider-McCoy Road	October 29, 2001	July 7, 2025	Replaced by CATS Micro
99 Village Rider-Huntersville	October 29, 2001	July 7, 2025	Replaced by CATS Micro
102 Arrowood Shuttle		November 26, 2007	Replaced by rerouted route 42 and routes 55 and 56.
200 Trinity Park	September 27, 2002	February 6, 2006	Discontinued due to low ridership.
201 Garden City	September 27, 2002	March 19, 2018	Replaced by realigned route 13 and rest redundant with route 7.
202 Washington Heights	September 27, 2002	March 2, 2009	Discontinued due to low ridership.
203 University Park	September 27, 2002	July 2, 2007	Discontinued due to low ridership.
204 LaSalle	July 2, 2007	March 19, 2018	Replaced by realigned route 3 and rest redundant with route 13.
220 Windsor Park	September 27, 2002	February 5, 2007	Consolidated into route 232.
231 Druid Hills	October 28, 2002	July 2, 2007	Discontinued due to low ridership.
232 Grier Heights	October 28, 2002	March 19, 2018	Replaced by realigned route 39 and rest made redundant with route 29.
233 CPCC/Northeast Campus Tryon Hills/Orr Road		February 6, 2006	Replaced by an extended Route 3.
234 Cityview		March 2, 2009	Already serviced by routes 8 and 34.
236 Revolution Park		November 26, 2007	Replaced by route 36 and extended route 25.
238 Paw Creek	October 3, 2005	March 2, 2009	Replaced by extended route 1.
249 UNCC/JW Clay		fall 2006	Split into 47 Nugget, 49 Niner, and 50 C.R.I. Shuttle.
251 Wachovia/URP Shuttle		early 2005	
290 Davidson Shuttle	October 29, 2001	July 7, 2025	Replaced by CATS Micro
590 Airport Connector-Northlake	June 16, 2014	October 1, 2018	Discontinued due to low ridership.
591 Airport Connector-Archdale	June 16, 2014	June 26, 2017	Discontinued due to low ridership.
MOBIE Southpark Shuttle	October 29, 2001	May 2002	Discontinued due to low ridership.
