= Interstate 485 =

Beltway around Charlotte, NC

Interstate 485
- Charlotte Outerbelt
- I-485 highlighted in red

Route information
- Auxiliary route of I-85
- Maintained by NCDOT
- Length: 66.68 mi (107.31 km)
- Existed: 1990–present
- NHS: Entire route

Major junctions
- Beltway around Charlotte
- US 29 / US 74 near Belmont; I-85 near Belmont; I-77 in Huntersville; I-85 near Concord; US 29 near Concord; US 74 in Matthews; US 521 near Pineville; I-77 / US 21 near Pineville

Location
- Country: United States
- State: North Carolina
- Counties: Mecklenburg

Highway system
- Interstate Highway System; Main; Auxiliary; Suffixed; Business; Future; North Carolina Highway System; Interstate; US; State; Scenic
← NC 481	→ US 501

Interstate 485 (I-485), also known as the Charlotte Outerbelt, is a 66.68-mile-long (107.31 km) auxiliary Interstate Highway encircling Charlotte, North Carolina. As a complete loop, it is primarily signed with "inner" and "outer" designations, though at some major interchanges, supplemental signage reflects the local compass orientation of the road. The entire route lies within Mecklenburg County.

A beltway for the Charlotte metropolitan area was first proposed in the mid-1970s, with the first section opening in 1990. The beltway was completed in stages over the next several decades, including the completion of the last segment of the highway on June 5, 2015.

== Route description ==
All of I-485 is part of the National Highway System, a network of roads important for the nation's defense, economy, and mobility. Most of I-485 ranges from four to eight lanes wide, and the speed limit for the entire loop is 70 mph (110 km/h).

=== Western half ===
The mileage begins at I-77/US 21 in southern Charlotte, near the South Carolina state line. The southwestern segment of I-485 from here to I-85 is known as the Seddon "Rusty" Goode Jr. Freeway. Proceeding through, I-485 crosses I-77/US 21 on a pair of bridges connecting I-485 to I-77, and vice versa. Past the bridges, the terrain of the Interstate transitions from asphalt to concrete. Crossing Coffey Creek, a branch of Sugar Creek, I-485 passes through generally suburban development with trees lining the sides of the road. Shortly after, it meets NC 49 (South Tryon Street), one of the primary thoroughfares through Charlotte. The Interstate gradually makes a slight curve to the north and meets an interchange with Arrowood Road, another one of Charlotte's main streets, with a Topgolf restaurant seen to the side. I-485 then curves left again and intersects NC 160 (Steele Creek Road), providing access to Charlotte Premium Outlets. Yet again, I-485 turns entirely north, exiting the suburban areas and entering some rural development. Crossing over the Piedmont rail line of Amtrak and a small stream, I-485 intersects with US 29/US 74 (Wilkinson Boulevard), allowing entrance to the main terminal of Charlotte Douglas International Airport. At that same moment, I-485 immediately meets I-85 at a stack interchange. The lanes from I-485 to southbound I-85 are often congested due to them merging into one.

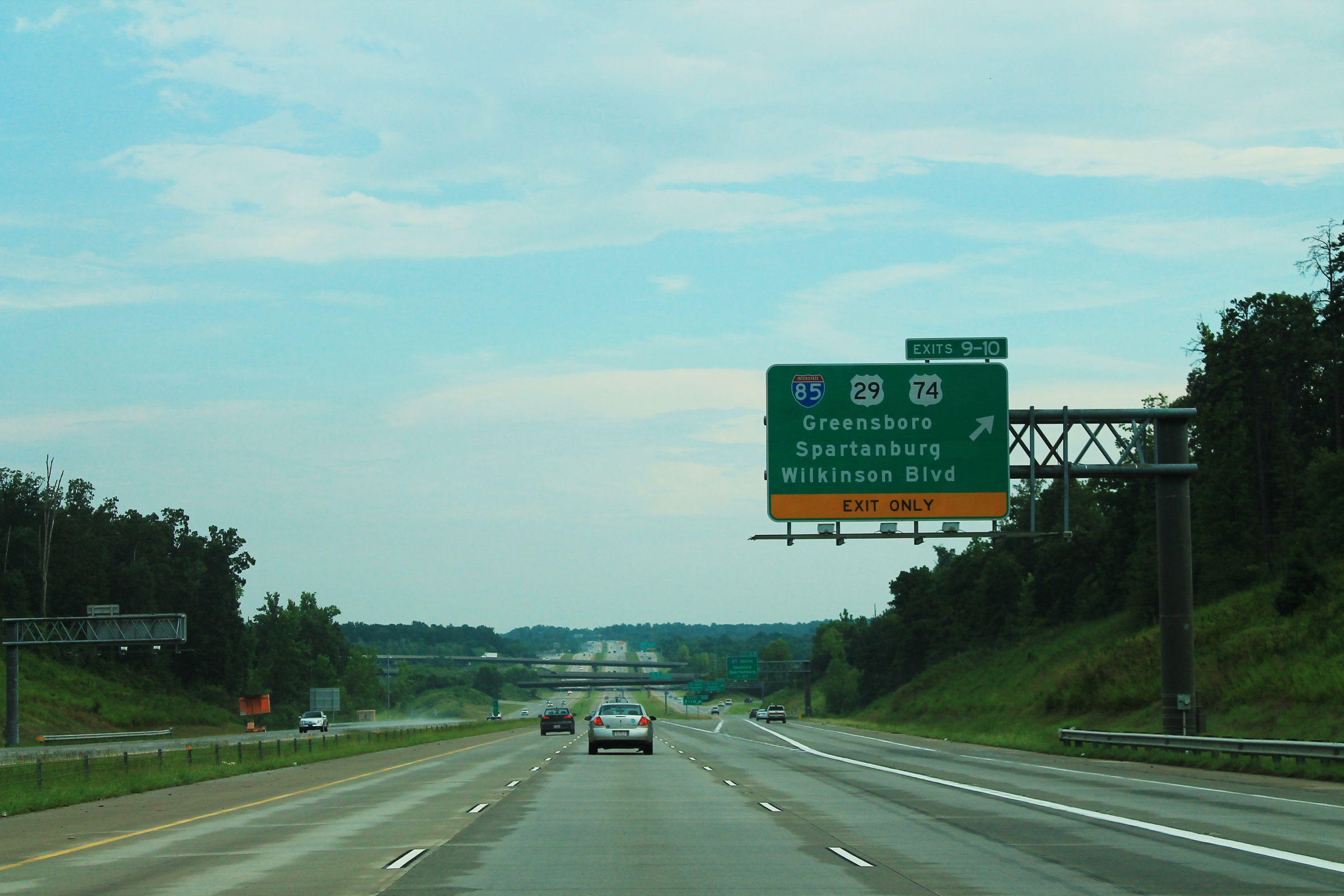
I-485 outbound at the I-85/US 29/US 74 interchange

North of the I-85 interchange, the naming of I-485 changes to the Craig Lawing Freeway, named after W. Craig Lawing, the former senator and politician of North Carolina. I-485 passes through more rural areas and just west of a wildlife refuge and lake. I-485 then intersects a roundabout interchange with Moores Chapel Road, allowing drivers to reach the U.S. National Whitewater Center. The Interstate next meets NC 27 at a partial cloverleaf interchange for Mount Holly, then crosses the Long Creek, a tributary of the Catawba River. I-485 continues through forested land and near a dog park before utilizing another partial cloverleaf interchange with NC 16 (Brookshire Boulevard) for Newton at milemarker 16. The interchange as of 2018 has been undergoing a feasibility study that would help improve traffic flow to I-485 and widen the northbound lanes on NC 16. I-485 then makes a gradual turn northeast, meeting another roundabout interchange with Oakdale Road, opened in 2017.

Continuing through forest yet again, I-485 turns even further to the east and crosses the Long Creek two more times, then enters suburban areas and meets the western terminus of NC 24 (Harris Boulevard) at an interchange with a single cloverleaf, where drivers on NC 24 can access Northlake Mall. I-485 then turns slightly northeast, entering Huntersville, and crosses another small stream before making another curve back east, intersecting with I-77 again at a large interchange composed of partial cloverleaf and turbine interchange ramps. The segment of I-485 from here to I-85 is the latest segment of the Interstate, completed in 2015.

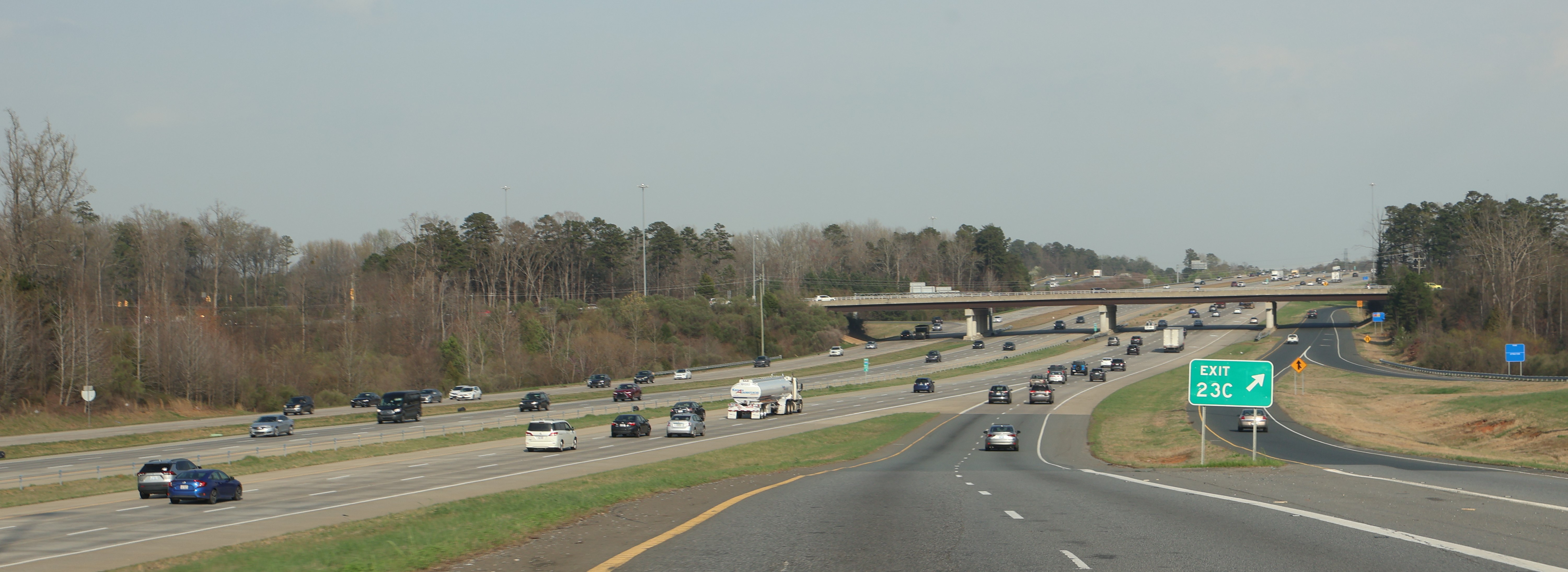
I-485 inbound approaching exit 23C

I-485 also picks up the name H. Allen Tate Jr. Highway, named after Allen Tate, the founder of Allen Tate Realtors (originally designated as Doctor Jay M. Robinson Freeway, 2001–2015, named after a former superintendent of the Charlotte-Mecklenburg Schools system). It immediately has a partial cloverleaf for NC 115 at exit 23C, which is proposed to undergo widening from I-485 to NC 24. The Interstate also passes above US 21 without direct access and then intersects a unique roundabout interchange with Benfield Road, Prosperity Church Road, and Prosperity Ridge Road; these three roads are all accessed via Robert Helms Road going inbound and Craven Thomas Road outbound respectively. I-485 then turns a bit southeast and reaches a diverging diamond interchange with Mallard Creek Road, another one of Charlotte's main roads. It turns even more in a southeast direction and reaches a turbine interchange with I-85 once more.

=== Eastern half ===
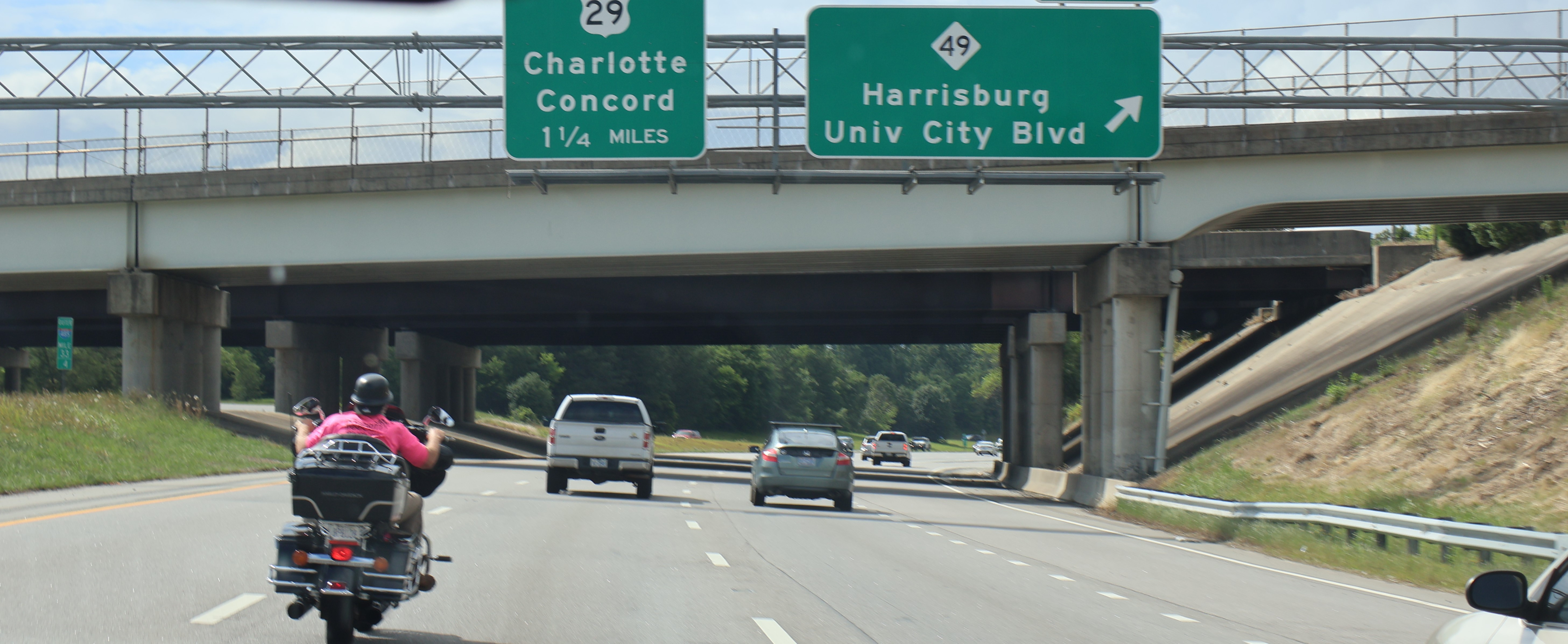
I-485 outbound at exit 33 for NC 49

From the I-85 interchange, I-485 becomes the Governor James G. Martin Freeway, named after the former governor of North Carolina. The terrain of I-485 becomes a mixture of concrete and asphalt, and the Interstate passes through somewhat suburban areas, intersecting US 29 (North Tryon Street) a second time, providing access to Concord Mills and Charlotte Motor Speedway. I-485 then meets NC 49 (University City Boulevard) at a partial cloverleaf interchange also a mile later for the University of North Carolina at Charlotte. It passes underneath Lynx Blue Line and crosses the Back Creek as it yet again enters rural areas, going over the Reedy Creek and paralleling, later crossing the McKee Creek, both of them being tributaries of the Rocky River.

From here, the terrain is entirely asphalt. I-485 then meets NC 24/NC 27 (Albemarle Road) a second time at a partial cloverleaf interchange. The Interstate intersects with NC 51 (Blair Road) a mile later near the town of Mint Hill. It turns entirely due south, then intersects NC 218 a mile after that by crossing the Clear Creek. Passing Idlewild Road, which underwent construction numerous times, I-485 turns southwest, and utilizes another partial cloverleaf interchange with US 74. The interchange ramps were closed as part of a project to build express lanes along I-485 on August 1, 2023.

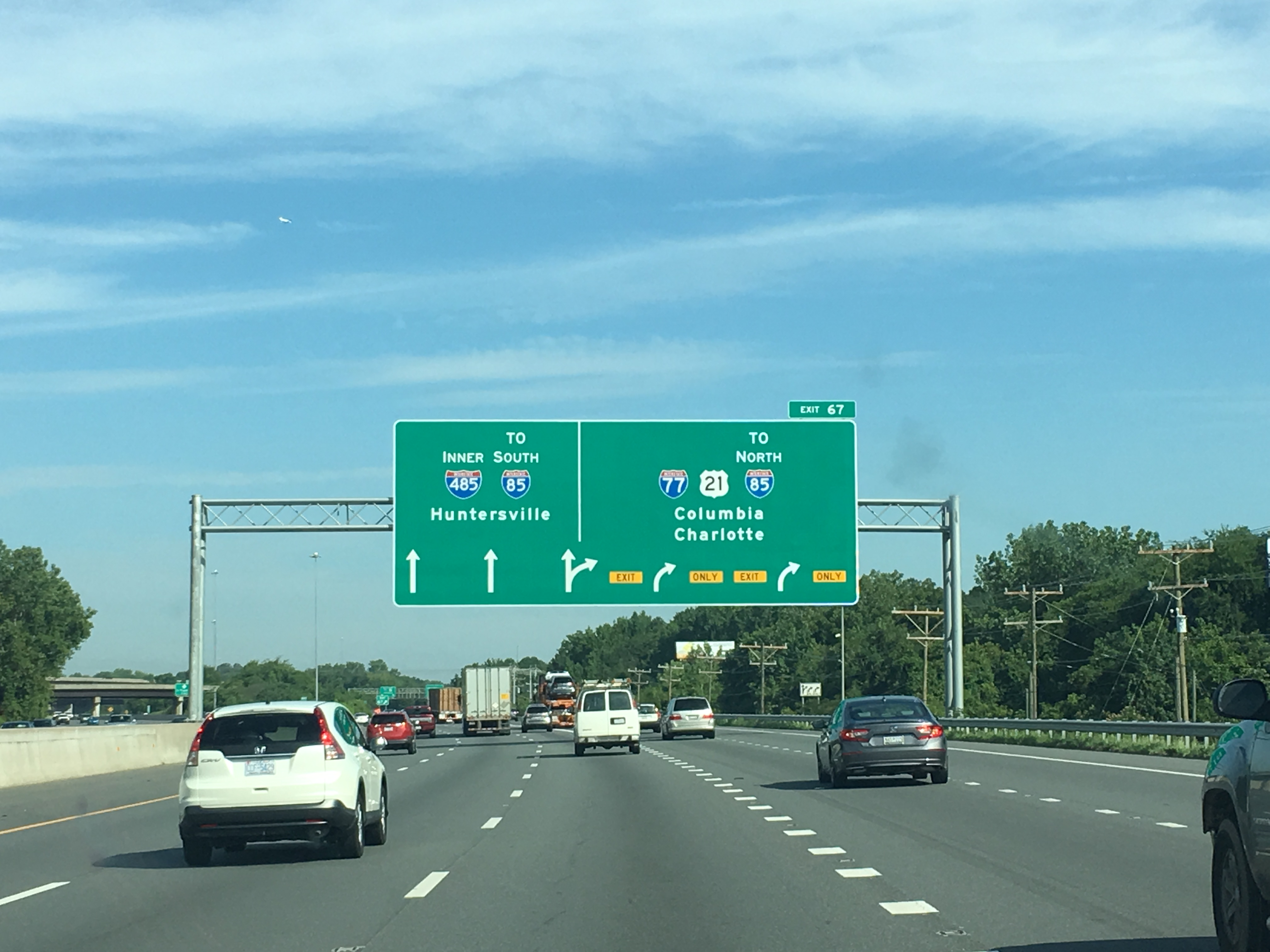
I-485 inbound at the interchange with I-77 south of Charlotte

Several miles later, I-485 has a partial cloverleaf interchange with NC 16 (Providence Road) again, just outside the Ballantyne neighborhood, where it travels entirely in a westward direction. It then enters suburban areas and receives the northern terminus of US 521 (Johnston Road) at milemarker 61. The express lanes in the future will connect Johnston Road directly to I-485, and vice versa. I-485 then turns a little northwest, crossing McAlpine Creek, another tributary of the Catawba River before turning in a north direction and intersecting NC 51 (Pineville-Matthews Road) at a partial cloverleaf interchange. A mile later, I-485 passes just south of the I-485/South Boulevard park and ride located off of South Boulevard at milemarker 65, as well as access to the President James K. Polk Historic Site. I-485 then continues northwest, crossing Sugar Creek, before reaching I-77/US 21 at a stack interchange, completing the beltway and resetting the mileage.

=== Express lanes ===
Opened on February 28, 2026, the 16.6-mile (26.7 km) toll manged lanes are operated by the North Carolina Turnpike Authority and are contained entirely within the median of I-485 with various connecting points to and from the general purpose lanes and direct access to US 521 (Johnston Road) and Westinghouse Boulevard. The express lanes (one lane for each direction) begin at US 74 (Independence Boulevard), in Matthews, and end at I-77/US 21 (General Paul R. Younts Expressway), in Charlotte. The maximum speed limit is 70 mph (110 km/h) with a minimum speed limit at 45 mph (72 km/h).

Only vehicles with two-axles or motorcycles are allowed on the express lanes. Emergency vehicles when responding to emergencies and mass transit vehicles are exempt and are not tolled.

==== Tolls ====
The express lanes uses open road tolling, with tolls payable with a valid transponder (NC Quick Pass, E-ZPass, ExpressToll, K-TAG, Peach Pass, Pikepass, SunPass, or TollTag) or bill by mail, which uses automatic license plate recognition and charge double the posted rate with additional fees. Toll rates for the first year will temporarily be determined by time of day and day of the week. After approximately twelve months of operations, toll rates will switch to dynamic pricing. Two-axle vehicles that are more than 22 feet (6.7 m) in length or two-axle vehicles with a single-axle trailer will be charged two times the posted rate and two times times the toll invoice rate if without a valid transponder.

As of January 2026, the total one-way inner-bound rate will range within $2.70–$4.90 and the total one-way outer-bound rate will range within $2.70–$7.35 with valid transponder.

=== Orientation and signage ===
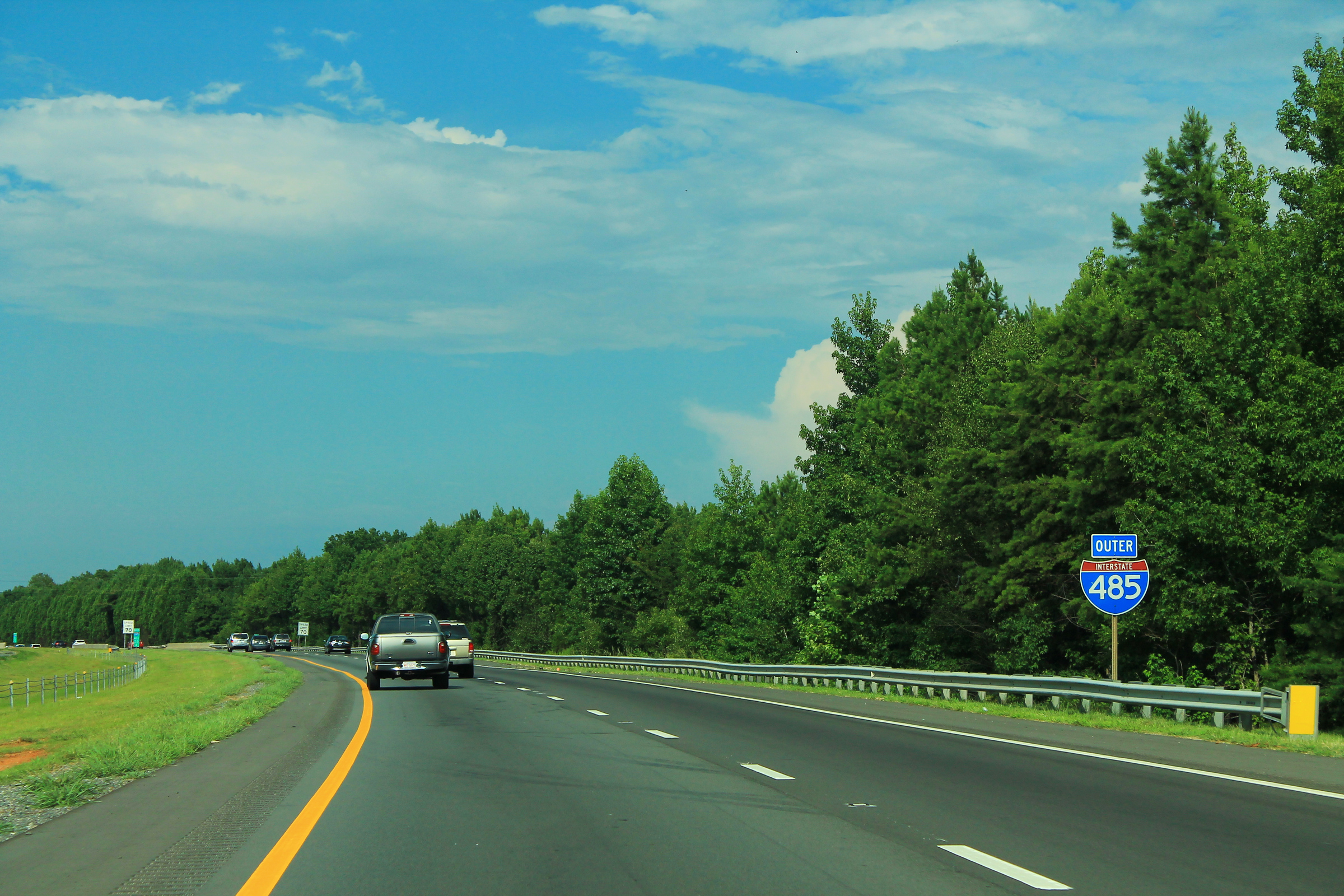
I-485 outbound near Matthews. Due to traffic traveling on the right side of the road in a counterclockwise direction, it is considered the "outer" portion of the loop.

Since I-485 is a beltway, the compass orientation of the freeway is not uniform around the loop. To remedy the uniformity issue, the inner–outer orientation system was implemented and became the primary method of signing the direction of travel around the loop. Some sections of the loop are signed with additional north–south or east/west labels (depending on the general direction of travel along a particular stretch) to aid drivers familiar with compass directions. Usually when both systems are utilized on signs, the compass directional banner is placed above the number shield and the inner/outer banner is placed below. Officials originally decided to use only "north" and "south" compass directions when signing the route, but, because this would be confusing with multiple "norths" and "souths", "inner" and "outer" designations were included. Although "east" and "west" signs exist, these were phased out in favor of "inner" and "outer" designations.

Traffic traveling in a clockwise direction around the city of Charlotte is on the "Inner" loop and traffic traveling in a counterclockwise direction is on the "Outer" loop. This system can be confusing, but it is logical; since traffic in the US generally travels on the right side of the road, the clockwise traveling lanes will always be the "Inner" lanes of a loop.

There are three control cities along the route: Huntersville, Matthews, and Pineville. Secondary control cities, which include Spartanburg, Statesville, Greensboro, and Columbia, are also listed at various interchanges for travelers that want to bypass Charlotte to other destinations, via I-77 and I-85.

== History ==
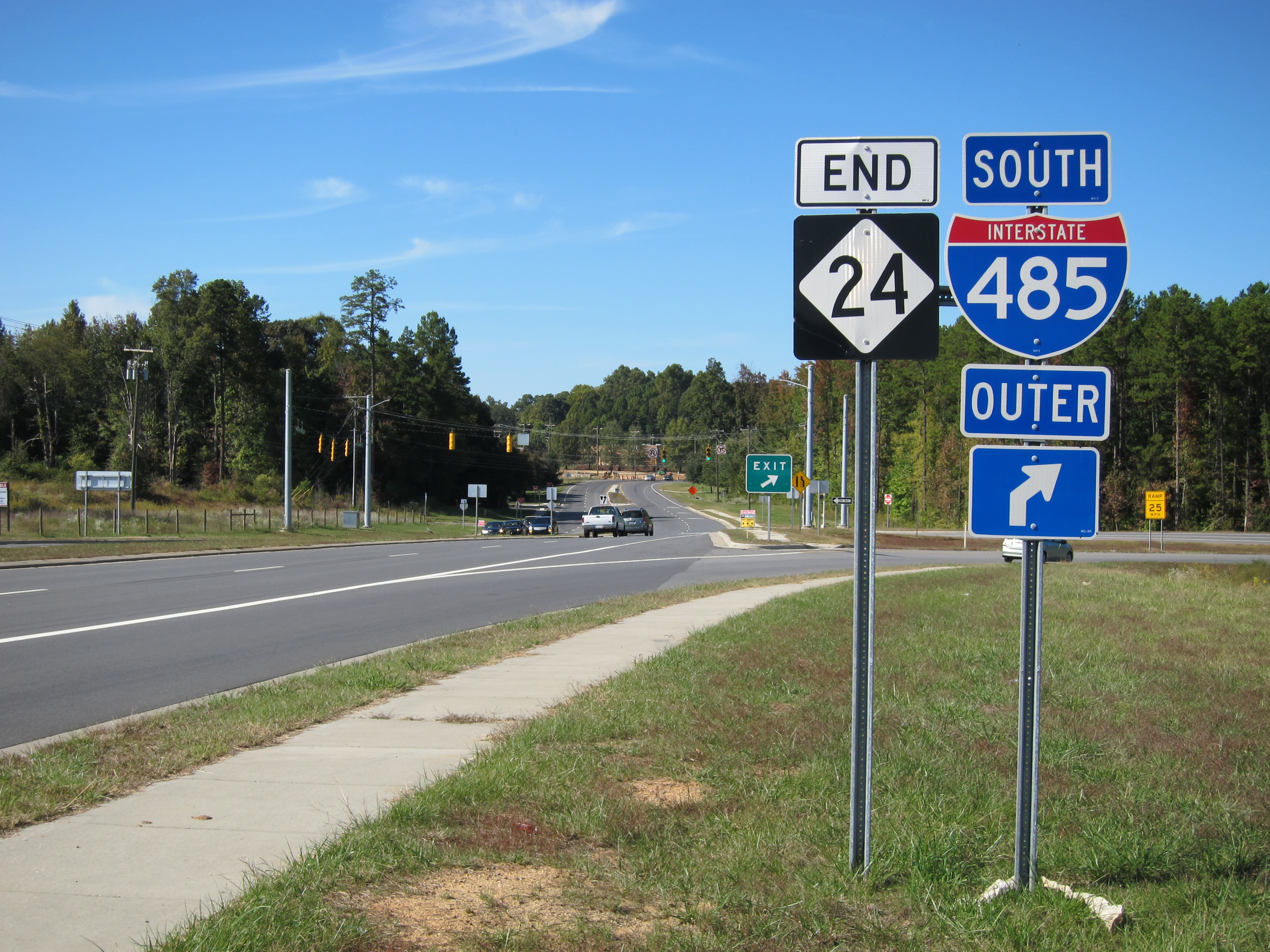
NC 24 ends at I-485, in Charlotte

The first section of what became I-485 was completed around 1967, connecting a newly opened section of I-85 with US 29 near the Cabarrus–Mecklenburg county line. This section became a part of I-485 on May 5, 1999, the first section of the highway on the north end of the county.

In 1975, planning began for the Charlotte outerbelt.

On July 8, 1988, Governor James G. Martin and state transportation secretary Seddon Goode attended a groundbreaking near US 521, marking the start of construction on the first 1.3-mile (2.1 km) section between US 521 and North Carolina Highway 51 (NC 51). Martin also announced the designation "Interstate 485" for what had previously been called the outerbelt. The section opened November 1, 1990, two months earlier than planned.

A $67.2-million (equivalent to $129 million in 2024) 2.6-mile (4.2 km) section of I-485 from US 521 to I-77 was opened on October 24, 1994. This section included a four-level interchange, the first and only in North Carolina, at its junction with I-77. On December 9, 1994, the section from NC 51 to Rea Road was opened.

On July 1, 1997, a $13.9-million (equivalent to $25.2 million in 2024) two-mile (3.2 km) section of I-485 was opened between I-77 and NC 49, a section designated the Seddon "Rusty" Goode Jr. Freeway, named for a member of the North Carolina Board of Transportation who helped decide where I-485 would be built.

On August 15, 1997, 2.3 miles (3.7 km) of I-485 were opened between Rea Road and NC 16 (Providence Road). An $8.6-million (equivalent to $15.6 million in 2024) 1.4-mile (2.3 km) section from NC 49 to Brown-Grier Road in the Steele Creek community was opened in two stages in August 26 and 27; the name of Brown-Grier Road was changed to Arrowood Road when that road was extended. Seven more miles (11 km) were opened on September 15, connecting NC 16 to US 74.

In May 1999, the original segment between I-85 and US 29 (North Tryon Street) was widened and rebuilt to Interstate standards, officially becoming part of I-485; a few months later, on August 13, the segment was extended to NC 49 (University City Boulevard). In December 1999, the main section of I-485 continued its extension north from US 74 to Idlewild Road, adding 2.3 miles (3.7 km). In June 2000, another three-mile (4.8 km) extension was completed, between Idlewild Road and Lawyers Road in Mint Hill, at a cost of $10.2 million (equivalent to $17.6 million in 2024).

In 2003, the last 12.5 miles (20.1 km) needed to link main I-485 to its northern stub were completed, at a cost of $55.4 million (equivalent to $90.3 million in 2024). Opening in two phases, the first 7.5-mile (12.1 km) segment was opened on September 3, 2003, between University City Boulevard and NC 27 (Albemarle Road). Two months later, the second five-mile (8.0 km) segment was opened on November 19, between Albemarle Road and Lawyers Road.

On October 19, 2004, I-485 was widened, from four to six lanes between I-77/US 21 and Arrowood Road, and extended between Arrowood Road and I-85 (near Belmont). Completion of the $100-million (equivalent to $159 million in 2024) seven-mile (11 km) segment was noted that it would relieve traffic along the Billy Graham Parkway and provide an alternative route to Charlotte Douglas International Airport. On December 15, 2006, a 2.3-mile (3.7 km) segment between I-85 (near Belmont) and NC 27 (Mount Holly Road) was opened. Signed as Future I-485, it was also dedicated as the Craig Lawing Freeway. Six months later, on May 9, 2007, another 1.5-mile (2.4 km) segment, between Mount Holly Road and NC 16 (Brookshire Boulevard) was opened. On December 4, 2008, a 5.5-mile (8.9 km) segment between Brookshire Boulevard and NC 115 (Old Statesville Road) was opened; all future signage was removed from the previous segments, with new signage showing connection between I-77, toward Statesville, and I-85, toward Spartanburg. In 2011, the West Boulevard interchange (exit 6) was opened to traffic, existing previously as a graded future interchange since 2004.

The final segment, from I-77 to I-85 near the UNC Charlotte, had begun the right-of-way acquisition phase with contracts awarded in June 2010. The segment was opened to traffic on June 5, 2015, finally completing the loop and providing a direct connection from I-77 near Huntersville to I-85 near Concord Mills.

Since 2003, the North Carolina Department of Transportation (NCDOT) has made sure that future segments of I-485 were designed with a minimum of six travel lanes. While the first segments of I-485 were already choked by traffic due to Charlotte's rapid growth, NCDOT could not immediately deal with the issue thanks to a 2000 policy that prevented the state using trust fund money, a major source of funding for new projects, to widen existing roads. Eventually, NCDOT was able to allocate new funds for a widening project, between US 521 (Johnston Road) and I-77/US 21, which was slated for construction in 2012. On November 18, 2011, NCDOT changed the plans with an extension of the widening project to Rea Road and additional space allocated for a future toll lane, between Johnston Road and I-77/US 21. Construction on the modified widening project began in 2013. At a cost of $83.3 million (equivalent to $107 million in 2024), the 9.2-mile (14.8 km) widening project was completed in December 2015.

On January 15, 2017, the Oakdale Road interchange (exit 18) was opened to traffic, existing previously as a graded future interchange since 2008.

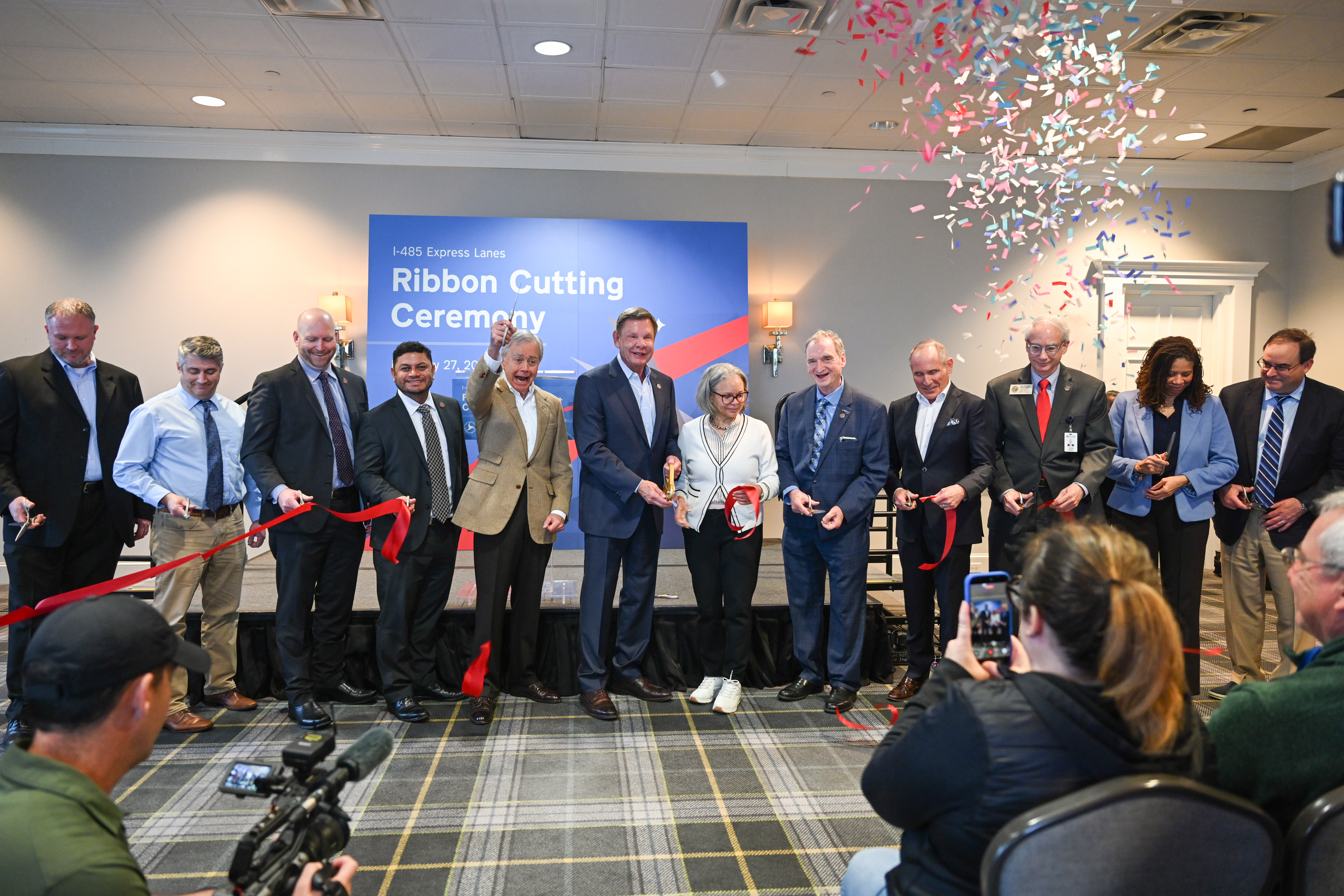
Express lanes ribbon cutting ceremony at the Ballantyne Hotel

In Summer 2019, construction began on the 16.6-mile (26.7 km) I-485 Express lanes project, from US 74 (Independence Boulevard), in Matthews, to I-77/US 21 (General Paul R. Younts Expressway), in Charlotte. At a cost of $202.9 million, the project would add one toll lane on each direction and also included the following improvements: adding additional general purpose lanes between Providence Road and Rea Road, extending auxiliary lanes between Independence Boulevard and East John Street, establishing dedicated connectors from the Express Lanes to Johnston Road (eastbound only) and Westinghouse Boulevard (westbound only), and incorporating the existing planned project of adding a new interchange at Weddington Road. Since November 18, 2011, NCDOT has made plans for future toll lanes along I-485. Modifying an already planned widening project between US 521 (Johnston Road) and I-77/US 21, it called on a future toll lane to be constructed as well as extending the widening project towards Rea Road. The future toll lanes, when completed would be between US 74 (Independence Boulevard) and I-77/US 21; in April 2014, the Charlotte Regional Transportation Planning Organization (CRTPO) adopted the 2040 Metropolitan Transportation Plan (MTP), which included establishing toll lanes along I-485. The first segment of the new toll lanes, between Johnston Road and I-77/US 21, were completed in December 2015 but were not opened. The new unopen lanes along I-485 became controversial and discussions were made about making it a high-occupancy vehicle lane (HOV lane), or at least temporally; however, local and state officials said that could not be done and would cost more for just temporary use of the lanes. On January 9, 2026, the Weddington Road interchange (exit 54) was opened to traffic. With a project cost expanded to $346 million, a ribbon cutting ceremony was held on February 27, with the express lanes opening early morning on February 28.

== Future ==
Requested by the Charlotte Regional Transportation Planning Organization (CRTPO) in 2025, the I-485 West Express Lanes is a proposed $300 million extension of the I-485 Express Lanes from I-77/US 21 (exit 67) to I-85 (exit 10) in southwest Charlotte. It is funded for preliminary engineering only in the 2026-2035 STIP.

== Exit list ==
Milemarker numbering along the loop freeway goes in a clockwise direction, beginning and ending at the interchange with I-77/US 21 in southern Charlotte. The entire route is in Mecklenburg County.

Location	mi	km	Exit	Destinations	Notes
Charlotte	1.6	2.6	1	NC 49 (South Tryon Street)	
Charlotte	3.0	4.8	3	Arrowood Road	
Charlotte	4.4	7.1	4	NC 160 (Steele Creek Road) – Fort Mill	Partial cloverleaf interchange
	6.0	9.7	6	West Boulevard	
	9.4	15.1	9	US 29 / US 74 (Wilkinson Boulevard) – CLT Airport	Exit is part of exit 10 outbound
	10.0	16.1	10	I-85 – Greensboro, Spartanburg	Signed as exits 10A (north) and 10B (south) on exit collector lanes; stack interchange
Charlotte	11.8	19.0	12	Moores Chapel Road	Double roundabout interchange
Charlotte	13.0	20.9	14	NC 27 (Mount Holly Road)	
Charlotte	15.4	24.8	16	NC 16 (Brookshire Boulevard) – Newton	Partial cloverleaf interchange
Charlotte	17.2	27.7	18	Oakdale Road	
Charlotte	20.3	32.7	21	NC 24 east (Harris Boulevard)	Partial cloverleaf interchange; to Northlake Mall
Huntersville	22.0	35.4	23	I-77 – Charlotte, Statesville	Signed as exits 23A (south) and 23B (north) outbound
Huntersville	23.0	37.0	23C	NC 115 (Old Statesville Road)	
Charlotte	25.4	40.9	26	Prosperity Ridge Road / Prosperity Church Road / Benfield Road	Double roundabout interchange
Charlotte	28.4	45.7	28	Mallard Creek Road	Diverging diamond interchange
Charlotte	30.6	49.2	30	I-85 – Spartanburg, Greensboro	Turbine interchange
Charlotte	32.2	51.8	32	US 29 (North Tryon Street) – Charlotte, Concord	Partial cloverleaf interchange; to Charlotte Motor Speedway
Charlotte	34.2	55.0	33	NC 49 (University City Boulevard) – Harrisburg	To UNC Charlotte
	37.5	60.4	36	Rocky River Road	
	38.4	61.8	39	Harrisburg Road	
Mint Hill	40.4	65.0	41	NC 24 / NC 27 (Albemarle Road) – Albemarle	
Mint Hill	42.2	67.9	43	NC 51 (Blair Road) – Mint Hill	
Mint Hill	44.1	71.0	44	NC 218 (Fairview Road) – Mint Hill	
Mint Hill	46.3	74.5	47	Lawyers Road	
Matthews	48.1	77.4	49	Idlewild Road	
Matthews	50.4	81.1	51	US 74 (Independence Boulevard) – Charlotte, Monroe	Signed as exits 51A (west) and 51B (east)
Matthews	50.4	81.1	—	I-485 inner (Express Lanes)	Outer terminus of I-485 Express lanes
Matthews	52.4	84.3	52	East John Street – Matthews, Stallings, Indian Trail	
Matthews	54.0	86.9	54	Weddington Road	
Charlotte	56.2	90.4	57	NC 16 (Providence Road) – Weddington	Partial cloverleaf interchange
Charlotte	59.4	95.6	59	Rea Road	Partial cloverleaf interchange
Charlotte	61.4	98.8	61	US 521 south (Johnston Road)	Signed as exits 61A (north) and 61B (south) inbound; to Ballantyne; northern terminus of US 521
Charlotte	61.4	98.8	—	US 521 south (Johnston Road)	Outbound exit and inbound entrance
Pineville	64.2	103.3	64	NC 51 (Pineville-Matthews Road) – Pineville, Matthews	Signed as exits 64A (north) and 64B (south); partial cloverleaf interchange; to Carolina Place Mall
Pineville	65.1	104.8	65	South Boulevard / North Polk Street – Pineville	Signed as exits 65A (south) and 65B (north) outbound; partial cloverleaf interchange; former US 521 north
Charlotte	66.3	106.7	—	Westinghouse Boulevard	Inbound exit and outbound entrance
Charlotte	67.6	108.8	—	I-485 outer (Express Lanes)	Inner terminus of I-485 Express lanes
Charlotte	67.6	108.8	67	I-77 / US 21 to I-85 north – Charlotte, Columbia	Stack interchange; to Westinghouse Boulevard; I-85 signed inbound
1.000 mi = 1.609 km; 1.000 km = 0.621 mi: Electronic toll collection

== See also ==
- Carowinds
- I-485 / South Boulevard (LYNX station)
