= Northlake Mall (Charlotte, North Carolina) =

Shopping mall in North Carolina, US

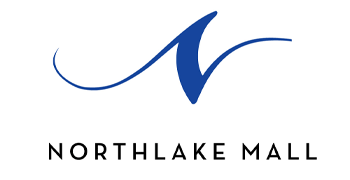

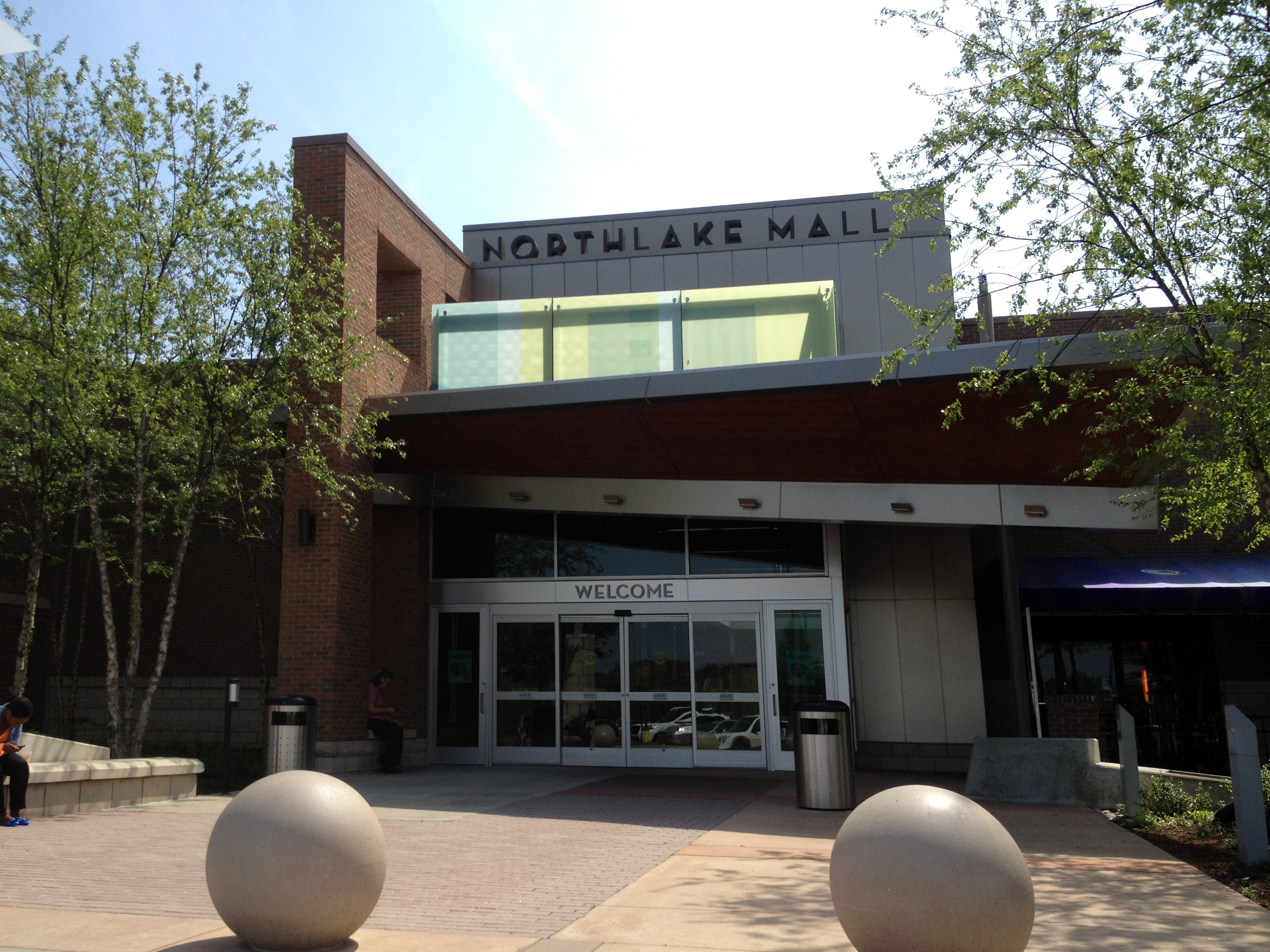
- Entrance to Northlake Mall, April 2012
- Location: Charlotte, North Carolina, United States
- Coordinates: 35.351703°N 80.852221°W
- Address: 6801 Northlake Mall Drive
- Opened: September 15, 2005; 21 years ago
- Developer: Taubman Centers
- Manager: Spinoso Real Estate Group
- Owner: Hull Property Group
- Num. of stores: 130
- Num. of anchor tenants: 5
- Floor area: 1,071,000 sq ft (99,500 m^{2}) (GLA)
- Floors: 2
- Website: shopnorthlake.com

Northlake Mall is a two-story modern shopping mall located eight miles (13 km) north of center city Charlotte, North Carolina off Interstate 77 at exit 18, Harris Blvd, and off Interstate 485 at exit 21, also at Harris Blvd. The mall was owned by Starwood Capital Group and is currently managed by Hull Property Group.

== History ==
In 2005, when Northlake Mall opened, it filled a void for the lack of retail in the northern portion of Mecklenburg County. A mall had been planned for this region for years, but plans never materialized until a few years prior to the mall's opening. It has become the dominant retail destination for the thriving communities in North Charlotte and the Lake Norman region, from where it gets its name.

It was announced in 2013 that Northlake Mall would receive Charlotte's second H&M store, after the recently announced store at Carolina Place Mall. These two stores, along with the planned store at the SouthPark Mall, would be the only H&M stores in the Charlotte area.

In June 2014, it was announced that Taubman Centers would sell Northlake Mall to Starwood Capitol Group, as part of a portfolio of malls, for an aggregate purchase price for the portfolio of $1.4 billion.

In February 2016, Starwood Capitol Group announced a $50 million expansion of the mall, adding an additional 200,000 square feet.

Dick's Sporting Goods closed in February 2021, in favor of the location at Concord Mills Mall. Apple Inc. closed their store without notice on March 1, 2023, due to 3 shootings at the mall in 75 days.

During the 2020s, a furniture store called Galleria Furniture opened in the former Dick’s Sporting Goods anchor store. Galleria Furniture utilizes the entirety of the anchor space.

== Anchor stores ==
The mall's anchor stores include:

- AMC Theatres
- Belk (180,000 sq ft (17,000 m^{2})
- Dillard's (186,000 sq ft (17,300 m^{2})
- Macy's (165,000 sq ft (15,300 m^{2}); opened as Hecht's, converted to Macy's in 2006.
- Galleria Furniture (75,000 sq ft (7,000 m^{2}); opened in the former Dick’s Sporting Goods.

=== Junior anchor stores ===
- H&M (25,600 sq ft (2,380 m^{2}); Space previously occupied by Borders from 2005 to 2011, remodeled as an H&M in 2014.

=== Former anchor stores ===
- Dick's Sporting Goods (75,000 sq ft (7,000 m^{2}); closed in February 2021
