= Matthews, North Carolina =

- Town
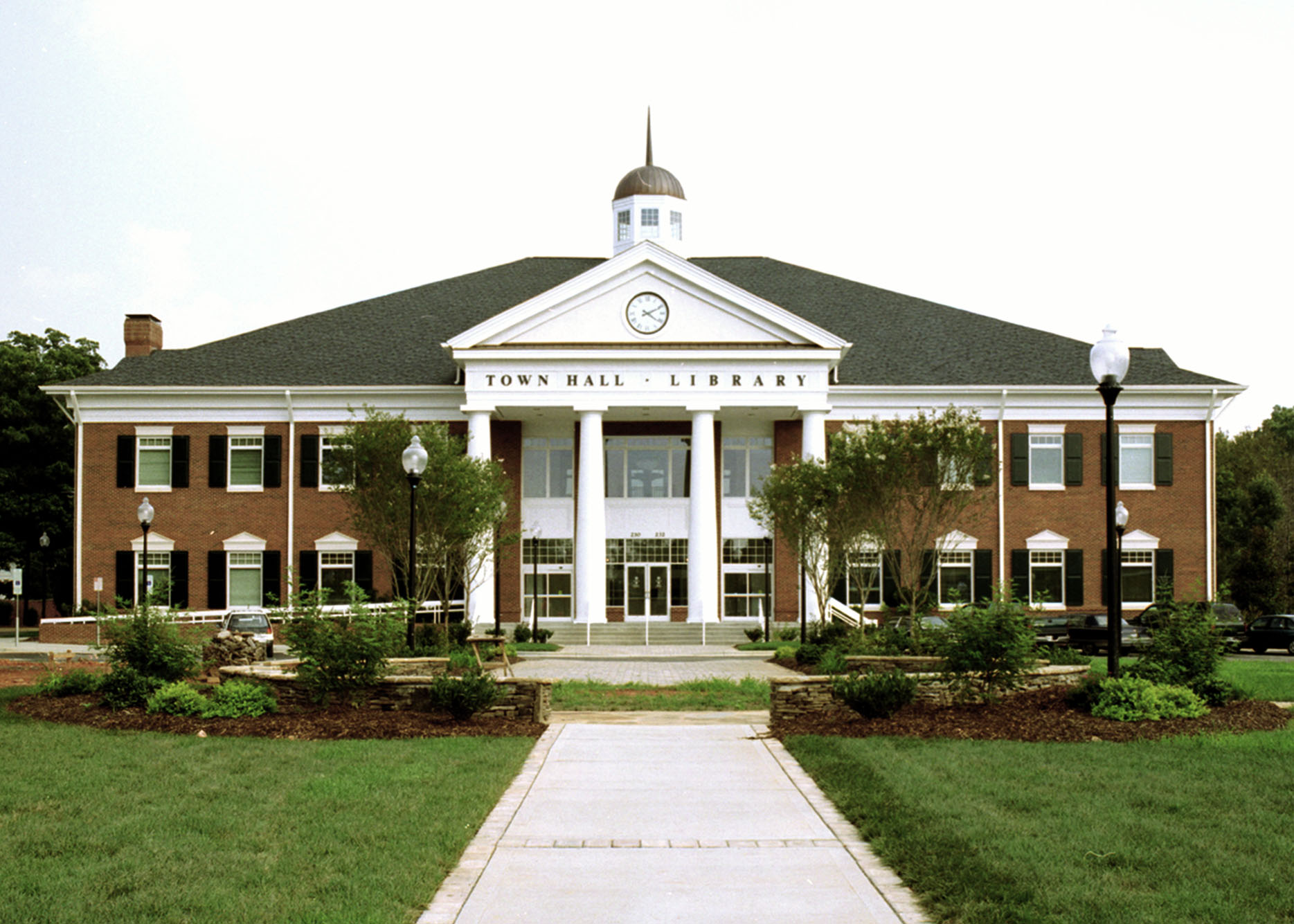
- Matthews Town Hall and library

- Flag Seal

- Location in Mecklenburg County and the state of North Carolina
- Coordinates: 35°07′10″N 80°42′36″W
- Country: United States
- State: North Carolina
- County: Mecklenburg
- Incorporated: 1879
- Named for: Edward Matthews

Government
  - Mayor: John Higdon
  - Town Manager: Melia James

Area
  - Total: 17.19 sq mi (44.53 km^{2})
  - Land: 17.12 sq mi (44.33 km^{2})
  - Water: 0.081 sq mi (0.21 km^{2})
- Elevation: 745 ft (227 m)

Population (2020)
  - Total: 29,435
  - Density: 1,720.1/sq mi (664.1/km^{2})
- Time zone: UTC−5 (Eastern (EST))
  - Summer (DST): UTC−4 (EDT)
- ZIP Code: 28105
- Area code: 704
- FIPS code: 37-41960
- GNIS feature ID: 2406108
- Website: www.matthewsnc.gov

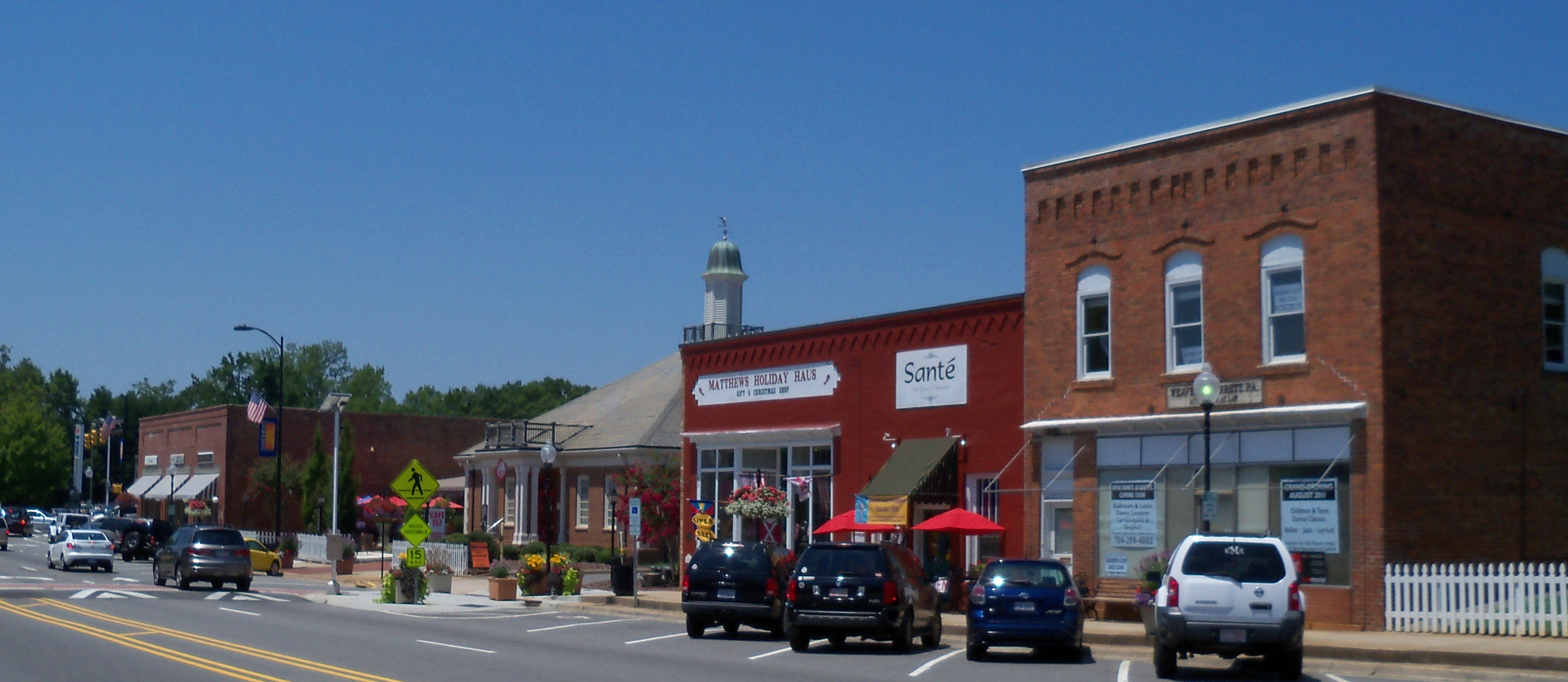
Downtown Matthews, North Carolina

Matthews is a town in southeastern Mecklenburg County, North Carolina, United States. It is a suburb of Charlotte. The population was 29,435 as of the 2020 census.

== History ==
In the early 19th century, the new settlement that would become Matthews was unofficially named "Stumptown" for the copious number of tree stumps left from making way for cotton fields. The community's name later changed to Fullwood, named after appointed area postmaster John Miles Fullwood. The establishment of a sawmill and the cotton and timber industry helped Fullwood change into a town. Prior to the first train arriving on December 15, 1874, Fullwood acted as a stagecoach stop between Charlotte and Monroe. The town was incorporated in 1879, and was renamed Matthews in honor of Edward Matthews, who was director of the Central Carolina Railroad, which would later become the Seaboard Air Line Railroad.

According to officials, the Matthews Alive Parade, part of a celebration held for the 31st time in 2023, was the largest Labor Day parade in the Southeastern United States.

== Geography ==
Matthews is located in southeastern Mecklenburg County at 35°7′1″N 80°42′59″W (35.116851, −80.716409). It is bordered to the northwest and southwest by the city of Charlotte and to the northeast by the town of Mint Hill. It is bordered to the southeast by the town of Stallings in Union County. Uptown Charlotte is 11 miles (18 km) to the northwest of the center of Matthews.

According to the U.S. Census Bureau, the town has a total area of 17.2 square miles (45 km^{2}), of which 0.08 square miles (0.21 km^{2}), or 0.47%, are water. The center of Matthews sits on a ridge which drains north toward McAlpine Creek and south toward its tributary Fourmile Creek. McAlpine Creek is a southwest-flowing tributary of Sugar River, which in turn flows south to meet the Catawba River in South Carolina.

U.S. Route 74 is the main highway through Matthews, leading northwest into Charlotte and southeast 14 miles (23 km) to Monroe. North Carolina Highway 51 runs through the northern part of Matthews, leading northeast into Mint Hill and west 10 miles (16 km) to Pineville. Interstate 485, the Charlotte Outerbelt, runs through the southern part of Matthews, with access from four interchanges.

== Demographics ==
Historical population
Census	Pop.	Note	%±
1880	191		—
1890	335		75.4%
1900	378		12.8%
1910	396		4.8%
1920	310		−21.7%
1930	454		46.5%
1940	486		7.0%
1950	589		21.2%
1960	609		3.4%
1970	783		28.6%
1980	1,648		110.5%
1990	13,651		728.3%
2000	22,127		62.1%
2010	27,198		22.9%
2020	29,435		8.2%
2025 (est.)	32,769	▲	11.3%
U.S. Decennial Census

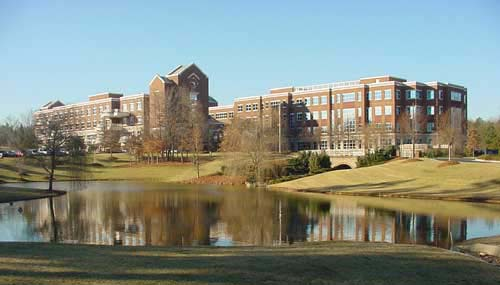
Novant Health Matthews Medical Center in Matthews

=== Racial and ethnic composition ===
Matthews town, North Carolina – Racial and ethnic composition Note: the US Census treats Hispanic/Latino as an ethnic category. This table excludes Latinos from the racial categories and assigns them to a separate category. Hispanics/Latinos may be of any race.
Race / Ethnicity (NH = Non-Hispanic)	Pop 2000	Pop 2010	Pop 2020	% 2000	% 2010	% 2020
White alone (NH)	19,625	21,344	20,897	88.69%	78.48%	70.99%
Black or African American alone (NH)	1,179	2,555	3,004	5.33%	9.39%	10.21%
Native American or Alaska Native alone (NH)	72	79	71	0.33%	0.29%	0.24%
Asian alone (NH)	520	1,148	1,400	2.35%	4.22%	4.76%
Native Hawaiian or Pacific Islander alone (NH)	2	8	12	0.01%	0.03%	0.04%
Other race alone (NH)	19	74	162	0.09%	0.27%	0.55%
Mixed race or Multiracial (NH)	157	411	1,188	0.71%	1.51%	4.04%
Hispanic or Latino (any race)	553	1,579	2,701	2.50%	5.81%	9.18%
Total	22,127	27,198	29,435	100.00%	100.00%	100.00%

=== 2020 census ===
As of the 2020 census, Matthews had a population of 29,435. The median age was 42.5 years. 21.6% of residents were under the age of 18 and 20.4% of residents were 65 years of age or older. For every 100 females there were 89.9 males, and for every 100 females age 18 and over there were 87.7 males age 18 and over.

100.0% of residents lived in urban areas, while 0.0% lived in rural areas.

There were 11,663 households and 8,496 families in Matthews, of which 31.0% had children under the age of 18 living in them. Of all households, 56.7% were married-couple households, 13.4% were households with a male householder and no spouse or partner present, and 25.5% were households with a female householder and no spouse or partner present. About 25.5% of all households were made up of individuals, and 12.1% had someone living alone who was 65 years of age or older.

There were 12,156 housing units, of which 4.1% were vacant. The homeowner vacancy rate was 1.0% and the rental vacancy rate was 6.8%.

=== 2006-2008 ===
As of the 2006-2008 American Community Survey, there were 26,901 people, 11,349 households, and 7,904 families in the town. According to the Census Bureau of 2000, the population density was 1,557.1 inhabitants per square mile (601.2/km^{2}). There were 138 housing units at an average density of 572.7 per square mile (221.1/km^{2}). According to the 2006-2008 American Community Survey, The racial makeup of the town was 82.3% White, 10.1% African American or Black, 0.3% American Indian or Alaska Native, 3.7% Asian, 0.00% Pacific Islander, 1.8% of other race, and 1.7% from two or more races. Hispanic or Latino of any race were 4.3% of the population.

There were 7,904 households, of which 36.1% had children under the age of 18 living with them, 63.4% were married/couples living together, 7.8% had a female householder with no husband present, and 25.5% were non-families. 22.4% of households were one person and 8.2% were one person aged 65 or older. The average household size was 2.61 and the average family size was 3.08.

The age distribution was 29.9% under the age of 19, 3.2% from 20 to 24, 25.6% from 25 to 44, 30.3% from 45 to 64, and 11% 65 or older. The median age was 40.3 years.

The median household income was $77,981 and the median family income was $88,600. Males had a median income of $65,909 versus $44,665 for females. The per capita income for the town was $35,250. About 2.8% of families and 3.8% of the population were below the poverty line, including 3.6% of those under age 18 and 4.9% of those age 65 or over.

== Education ==
Matthews is in the Charlotte-Mecklenburg Schools system. Schools in the Matthews city limits include Matthews Elementary, Crown Point Elementary, and Elizabeth Lane Elementary; Crestdale Middle; David W. Butler High School.

Elementary schools serving sections of Matthews include Matthews Elementary, Crown Point, Elizabeth Lane, Mint Hill Elementary in Mint Hill, and Providence Spring (outside of Matthews).

Much of Matthews is zoned to Crestdale Middle School. Portions of Matthews are zoned to Mint Hill Middle in Mint Hill, as well as South Charlotte Middle School. Most of Matthews is zoned to Butler High School, while portions are zoned to Providence High School.

Public charter schools include Matthews Charter Academy, Telra Institute and Socrates Academy. Religious schools nearby include Covenant Day School, Charlotte Christian School, Carmel Christian, Blessed Sacrament Academy, and Greyfriars Classical Academy.

Matthews is served by a branch of the Charlotte Mecklenburg Library. The library is located on the first floor of the Matthews Town Hall and is one of the most active in the system.

== Economy ==
Companies with headquarters in Matthews include:

- Family Dollar Stores, a retail store chain
- Harris Teeter, a grocery store chain
- Pokertek, a gaming device manufacturer

== Sports ==
Matthews is home to professional soccer club Stumptown Athletic, named after the suburb's nickname. It was founded in 2019 and plays in US Soccer's third division, the National Independent Soccer Association. Its home stadium is the 5,000 capacity Sportsplex at Matthews.

== Notable people ==
- Jamar Adams, NFL safety
- Tyler Barnhardt, actor
- James B. Black, member of the North Carolina General Assembly
- J. Curtis Blackwood Jr., Republican member of the North Carolina General Assembly
- Robert Blanton, NFL strong safety
- Jarrett Boykin, wide receiver in both the NFL and CFL
- Laura Budd, member of the North Carolina House of Representatives
- Cierra Burdick, WNBA player
- Ty Buttrey, MLB pitcher
- Dion Byrum, football cornerback
- Tricia Cotham, Republican member of the North Carolina House of Representatives
- Brooklyn Decker, model and actress best known for her appearances in the Sports Illustrated Swimsuit Issue
- Jahwan Edwards, football running back
- Ikem Ekwonu, NFL offensive tackle for the Carolina Panthers
- Riley Ferguson, football quarterback
- Jim Gulley, member of the North Carolina General Assembly
- Tomas Hilliard-Arce, soccer player
- Patrick Hogan, soccer player
- Darius Kilgo, NFL defensive tackle and two-time Super Bowl champion
- Jordan Lloyd, winner of the reality TV show Big Brother 11 and contestant on Big Brother 13 and The Amazing Race 16
- Jennifer Loven, journalist, former White House press correspondent for the Associated Press (AP)
- Alex Maughan, MLR rugby forward
- Ken McCool, member-elect of the North Carolina House of Representatives from the 105th district
- Kenneth Moore, NFL wide receiver
- Jerry Reary, NASCAR driver
- Channing Stribling, football cornerback

== Sister cities ==
Matthews is twinned with:

- Sainte-Maxime, Var, France
