= North Carolina Highway 218 =

State highway in North Carolina, US

North Carolina Highway 218

Route information
- Maintained by NCDOT
- Length: 31.6 mi (50.9 km)
- Existed: 1935–present

Major junctions
- West end: NC 51 in Mint Hill
- I-485 in Mint Hill; US 601 in Unionville
- East end: US 74 in Polkton

Location
- Country: United States
- State: North Carolina
- Counties: Mecklenburg, Union, Anson

Highway system
- North Carolina Highway System; Interstate; US; State; Scenic
← NC 217	→ US 220

North Carolina Highway 218 (NC 218) is a primary state highway in the U.S. state of North Carolina. The highway runs east–west from Mint Hill to Polkton.

== Route description ==
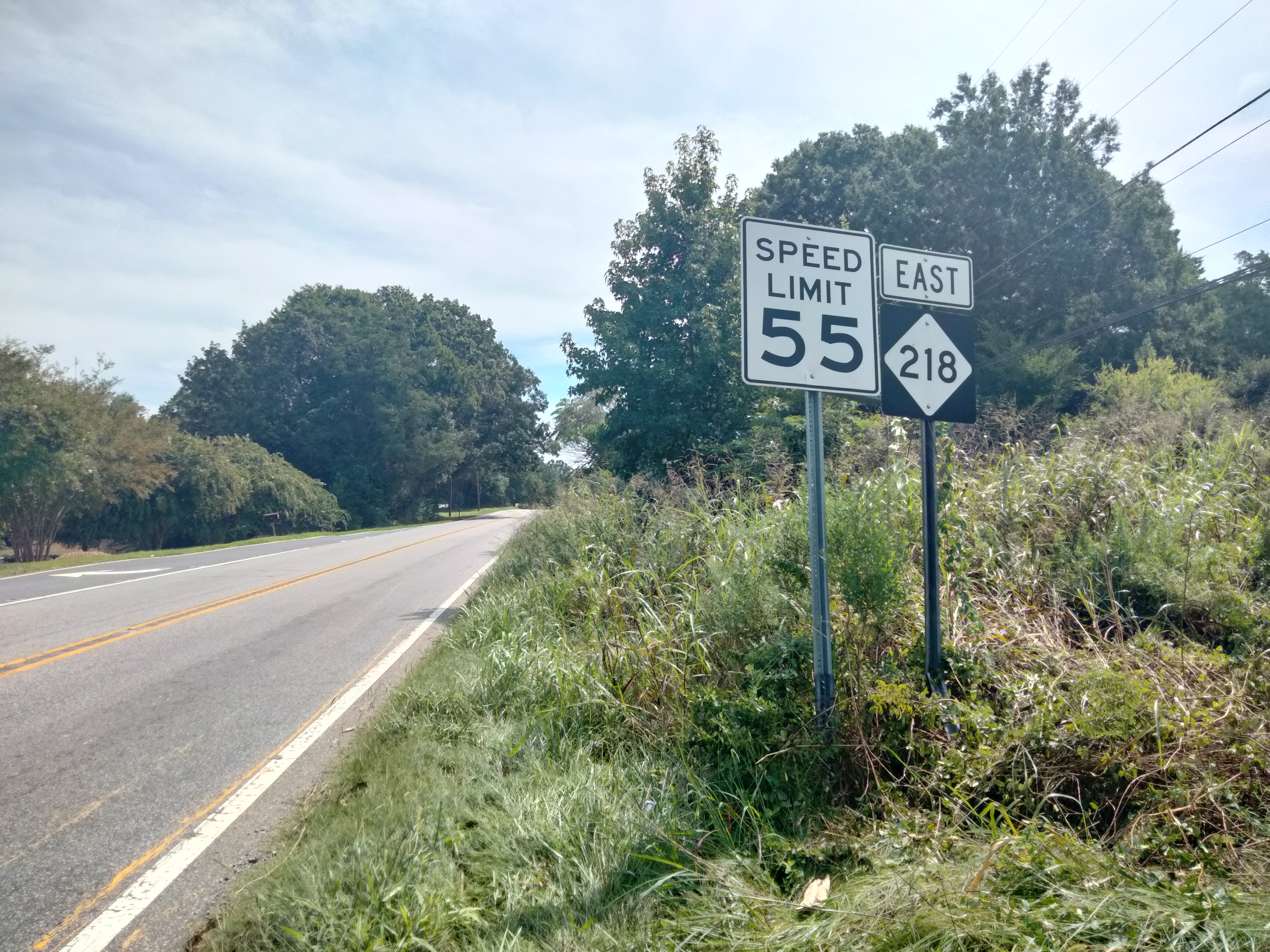
View east along NC 218 past the US 601 junction in Unionville

NC 218 traverses 31.6 miles (50.9 km); starting in Mint Hill, it goes through northern Union County, then ends in Polkton. The entire route is a two-lane rural highway and is a significant truck route. It also has seasonal beach bound traffic. Residential communities in Union County and a few near Interstate 485 (I-485) in Mecklenburg County contribute the majority of the daily commuter traffic.

== History ==
Established as a new primary routing in 1935, it connected the towns of Mint Hill and Polkton. In the early 1940s, it was extended in Polkton when U.S. Route 74 (US 74) was rerouted further south from town. In the 1960s, NC 218 was moved onto a new extension of Williams Street in Polkton, leaving Old US 74.

== Junction list ==
County	Location	mi	km	Destinations	Notes
Mecklenburg	Mint Hill	0.0	0.0	NC 51 (Blair Road / Matthews Mint Hill Road) / Wilgrove Mint Hill Road	
Mecklenburg	Mint Hill	1.0– 1.2	1.6– 1.9	I-485 – Pineville, Concord	Exit 44 (I-485)
Union	Fairview, Union County	7.3	11.7	US 601 (Concord Highway) – Concord, Monroe	
Union		13.8	22.2	NC 200 (Morgan Mill Road) – Locust, Monroe	
Union	New Salem	18.0	29.0	NC 205 – Oakboro, Marshville	
Anson	Polkton	31.6	50.9	US 74 – Monroe, Charlotte, Wadesboro, Wilmington	
1.000 mi = 1.609 km; 1.000 km = 0.621 mi
