= Charlotte Premium Outlets =

Shopping mall in North Carolina

- Location: Charlotte, North Carolina, United States
- Coordinates: 35.167503°N 80.972099°W
- Address: 5404 New Fashion Way
- Opened: July 31, 2014; 12 years ago
- Developer: Simon Property Group
- Manager: Simon Property Group
- Owner: Simon Property Group (50%), Tanger Outlet Centers, Inc. (50%)
- Num. of stores: 100
- Floor area: 399,000 square feet (37,100 m^{2})
- Floors: 1 (open-air)
- Parking: Parking lot
- Website: premiumoutlets.com/outlet/charlotte

The Charlotte Premium Outlets is a 399,000-square-foot (37,100 m^{2}) open-air outlet mall located in Charlotte, North Carolina. It is located off of Interstate 485 in the Steele Creek neighborhood. It is owned by a joint venture of 50% Simon Property Group and 50% Tanger Outlet Centers, Inc.

== History ==
In September 2013, construction of Charlotte Premium Outlets began on 42 acres (17 ha) of mostly farmland. Charlotte Premium Outlets opened on July 31, 2015 with 100 stores and restaurants. Charlotte Premium Outlets is the second-largest outlet shopping center in the Charlotte metropolitan area, behind Concord Mills. The construction of Charlotte Premium Outlets changed the Steele Creek neighborhood from a mostly rural, two-lane thoroughfare to an expansive new retail center for the Charlotte area, and now includes other shopping centers, hotels, and restaurants.

== Stores ==
The outlet mall is home to 100 stores, including Brooks Brothers, Saks 5th Avenue Off 5th, Cole Haan, Michael Kors, Steve Madden, Puma, Nike, and Vera Bradley. It also includes a food court.
