= North Carolina Highway 51 =

State highway in Mecklenburg County, North Carolina, US

North Carolina Highway 51

Route information
- Maintained by NCDOT
- Length: 22.2 mi (35.7 km)
- Existed: 1934–present

Major junctions
- South end: SC 51 at the South Carolina state line in Pineville
- I-485 in Pineville; US 74 in Matthews; I-485 in Mint Hill
- North end: NC 24 / NC 27 in Mint Hill

Location
- Country: United States
- State: North Carolina
- Counties: Mecklenburg

Highway system
- North Carolina Highway System; Interstate; US; State; Scenic
← NC 50	→ US 52

North Carolina Highway 51 (NC 51) is a primary state highway in the U.S. state of North Carolina entirely in Mecklenburg County. It connects the towns of Pineville, Matthews and Mint Hill.

== Route description ==
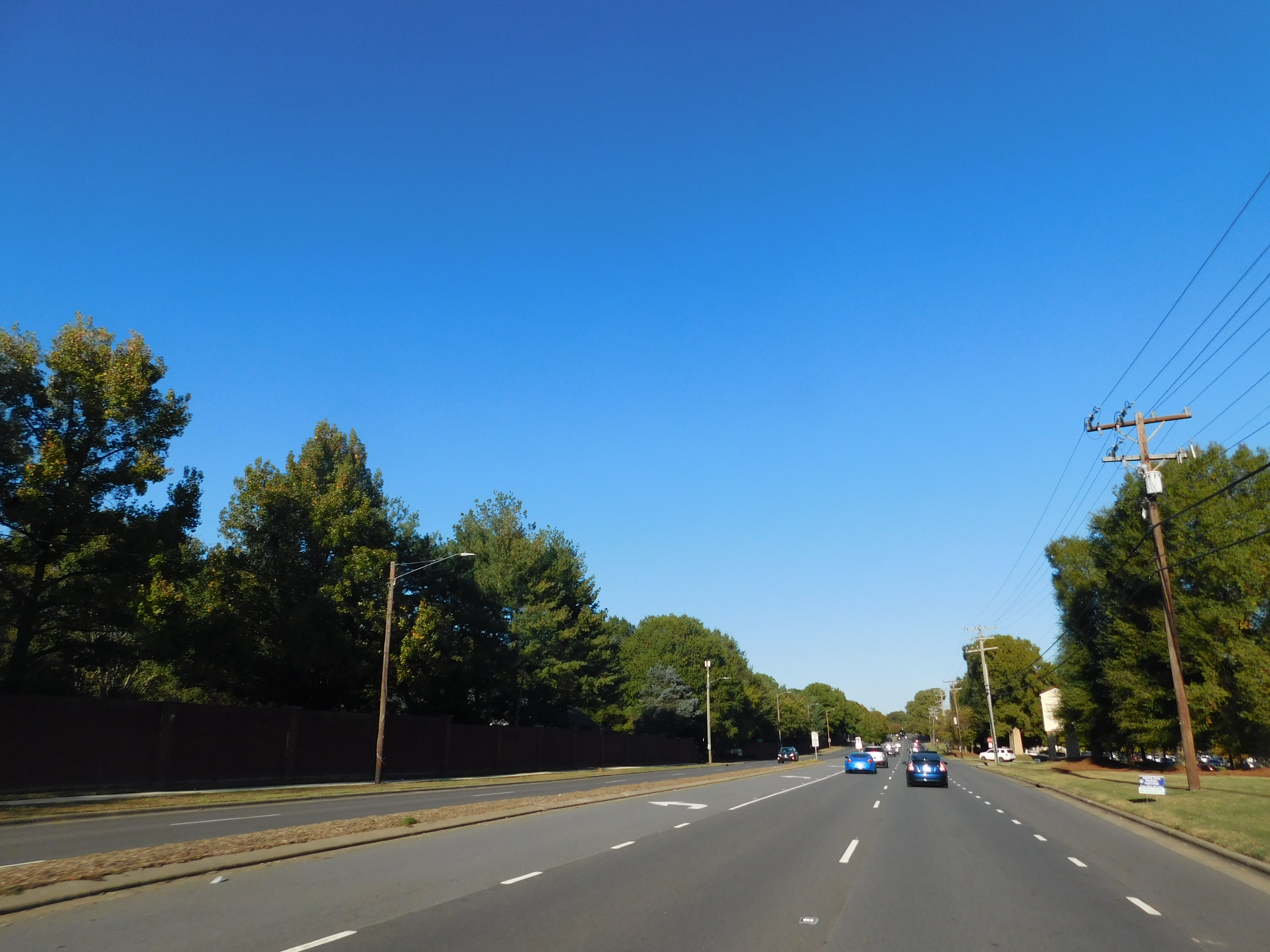
NC 51 eastbound in Matthews

Though NC 51 begins at the state line, SC 51 is a short 1-mile-long (1.6 km) road that connects with US 21, near Fort Mill, South Carolina. Crossing the state line, NC 51 quickly becomes a four-lane road as it goes through the town of Pineville. After its first intersection with I-485, it enters the Charlotte city limits. In Charlotte, NC 51 crosses the busy intersections of Johnston Road and Providence Road, known for rush-hour traffic during the weekdays. In Matthews, NC 51 bypasses the main downtown area, followed by a semi-controlled interchanged with US 74 (Independence Boulevard). As the NC 51 enters Mint Hill, the road narrows to two-lane. NC 51 crosses intersects I-485 again, before ending at NC 24/NC 27 (Albemarle Road).

== History ==
NC 51 northbound in Mint Hill

The first NC 51 was an original state highway that traveled from NC 20, in Rockingham, to NC 74, in Wadeville. In 1928, Rockingham to Ellerbe became an extension of NC 75. In 1934, NC 51 was decommissioned in favor of NC 73, between Ellerbe and Mount Gilead, and NC 109, between Mount Gilead and Wadeville.

The second and current NC 51 was established in 1934 as a renumbering of NC 276, between US 21/US 521, in Pineville, to NC 27, near Allen. In 1968, NC 51 was extended to the South Carolina state line, replacing a segment of US 21. In 1981, NC 51 was placed on new alignment in Pineville, abandoning an old routing along Lee Street and eliminating a short concurrency with US 521. In 1995, NC 51 was placed on new bypass north of downtown Matthews, marked as Matthews Township Parkway. The old alignment along Matthews-Mint Hill Road was downgraded to secondary road.

=== North Carolina Highway 276 ===
North Carolina Highway 276
- Location: Pineville–Allen
- Length: 20.4 mi (32.8 km)
- Existed: 1930–1934

North Carolina Highway 276 (NC 276) appeared in 1930 as new primary routing from NC 26, in Pineville, to NC 27, near Allen. In 1934, it was renumbered as the second NC 51.

== Major intersections ==
The entire route is in Mecklenburg County.

Location	mi	km	Destinations	Notes
Pineville	0.0	0.0	SC 51 south – Fort Mill	South Carolina state line
Pineville	2.5– 2.8	4.0– 4.5	I-485 – Matthews, Huntersville	I-485 exit 64
Charlotte	8.5	13.7	NC 16 (Providence Road) – Waxhaw	
Matthews	13.1– 13.4	21.1– 21.6	US 74 (Independence Boulevard) – Charlotte, Monroe	Interchange
Mint Hill	18.9	30.4	NC 218 east (Fairview Road) / Wilgrove Mint Hill Road – Fairview	Western terminus of NC 218
Mint Hill	20.6– 20.7	33.2– 33.3	I-485 – Matthews, Huntersville	I-485 exit 43
Mint Hill	22.2	35.7	NC 24 / NC 27 (Albemarle Road) – Charlotte, Albemarle	
1.000 mi = 1.609 km; 1.000 km = 0.621 mi
