= Sharon Road West station =

Tram stop in Charlotte, North Carolina, United States

Sharon Road West
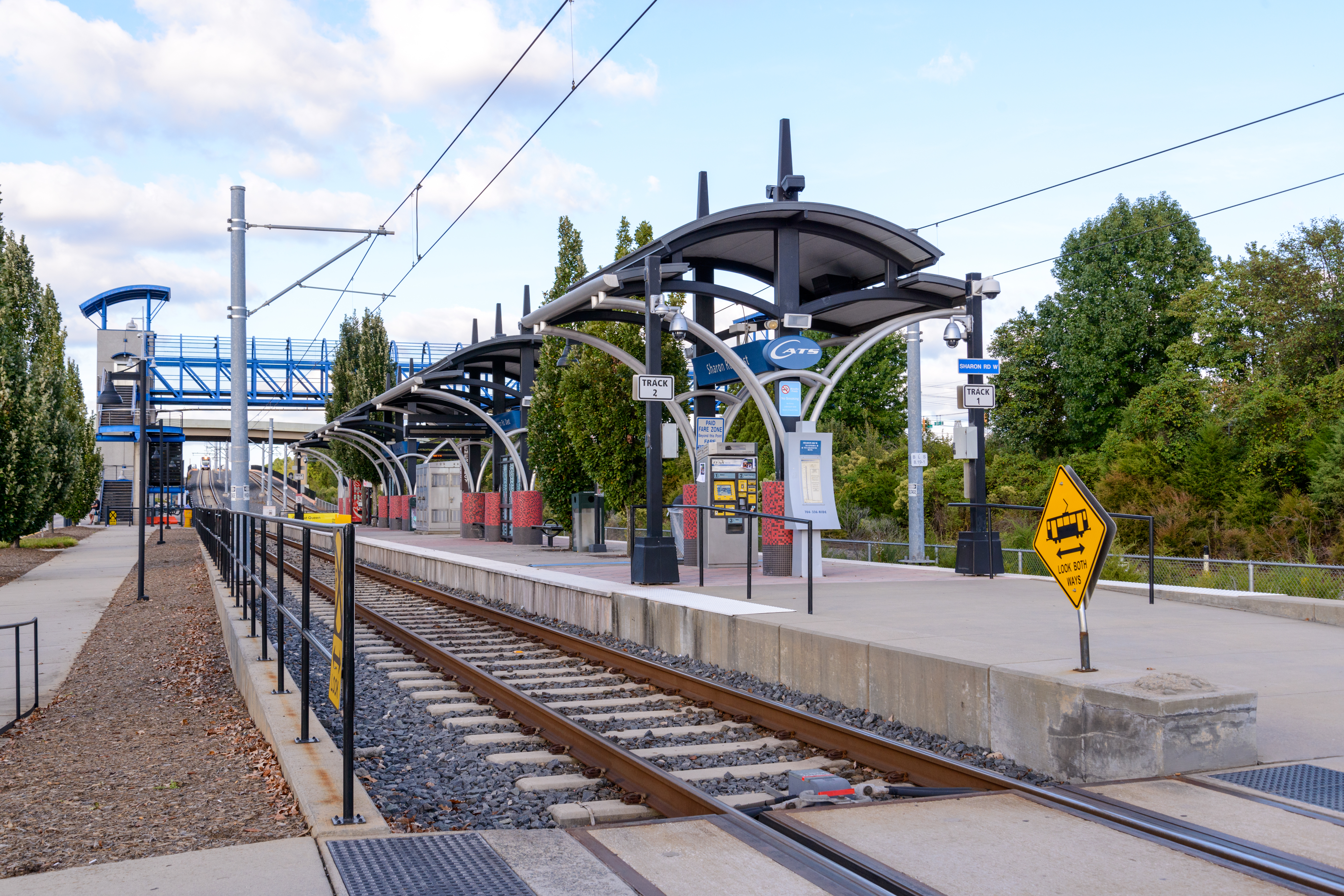
- Train arriving at Sharon Road West

General information
- Location: 8815 Crump Road; Charlotte, North Carolina
- Coordinates: 35°7′10″N 80°52′55.5″W
- Owner: Charlotte Area Transit System
- Platforms: 1 island platform
- Tracks: 2
- Bus stands: 2
- Connections: CATS: 19, 43, 55

Construction
- Structure type: At-grade
- Parking: 188 spaces
- Cycle facilities: Bicycle racks
- Accessible: yes
- Architect: Ralph Whitehead Associates
- Architectural style: Postmodern

History
- Opened: November 24, 2007

Services
Preceding station	CATS	Following station
I-485/South Boulevard Terminus	Lynx Blue Line	Arrowood toward UNC Charlotte–Main
Location

Sharon Road West is a light rail station in Charlotte, North Carolina. The at-grade island platform is a stop along the Lynx Blue Line and serves the industrial area of Montclaire South, including the Snyder's-Lance factory. It also features a 188-space park and ride and local bus connections.

== Location ==
The station and the park and ride are both located along Crump Road and connects directly to the intersection of South Boulevard and Sharon Road West via a pedestrian bridge that goes over both the Blue Line and Norfolk Southern tracks. Another walkway, going north, leads to the Snyder's-Lance entrance gate.

== History ==
The station was part of the overall planning and construction of the LYNX Blue Line; starting in 1999, it was approved in February 2000 and construction began on February 26, 2005. The station officially opened for service on Saturday, November 24, 2007, and as part of its opening celebration fares were not collected. Regular service with fare collection commenced on Monday, November 26, 2007.

== Station layout ==
The station consists of one island platform and four covered waiting areas; other amenities include ticket vending machines, emergency call box, and bicycle racks. The station also features several art installations including bas-reliefs entitled Skyrocket Oak by Alice Adams, drinking fountain basins designed to look like dogwoods, the North Carolina state flower, by Nancy Blum, bark motifs on both the pavers and shelters by Leticia Huerta and the painting of the bridge and retaining walls by Marek Ranis. The most notable art installations at the station are its two, 18 feet (5.5 m) tall, stainless-steel sculptures at the intersection of South Boulevard and Sharon Road West created by Cliff Garten.

Adjacent to the station is the park and ride, which features a 188-space surface parking lot and two bus bays. Parking is free for patrons for either bus or light rail and is limited to 24 hours.
