= Allen Tate Realtors =

American real estate company operating in North and South Carolina

Howard Hanna Allen Tate
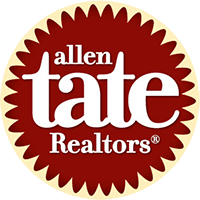
- Industry: Real estate
- Founded: 1957; 69 years ago
- Founder: H. Allen Tate, Jr
- Headquarters: Charlotte, North Carolina, United States
- Number of locations: 75
- Area served: North Carolina and South Carolina
- Key people: Pat Riley (President & COO - Allen Tate Companies); Phyllis York Brookshire (President - Allen Tate Realtors)
- Number of employees: 1,800
- Parent: Howard Hanna Real Estate Services
- Website: www.allentate.com

Allen Tate Realtors is an American independent real estate company headquartered in Charlotte, North Carolina, with 75 offices and 1,800 agents in North and South Carolina.

As of 2017, Allen Tate was the largest real estate company in the Carolinas; the sixth in the nation among independently owned, non-franchised brokers; and the tenth in the nation among the top 500 largest real estate companies (ranked by closed transaction sides for 2017).

Allen Tate Realtors is a founding member of Leading Real Estate Companies of the World, a network of more than 140,000 affiliated agents in 30 countries. In 2013, this network accounted for 686,947 home sales units (26.7% of all home sales units in the United States).

== History ==
The Allen Tate Company was formed in 1957 by H. Allen Tate, Jr. after graduating from the University of North Carolina. The company's first office was located in the Tryon Plaza building at 112 S. Tryon St. in Charlotte, with the company selling both real estate and insurance.

By 2019, Allen Tate Realtors' headquarters was in Charlotte at 6700 Fairview Road in the South Park area. The company had offices in the Charlotte, Triad and Triangle regions of North Carolina, and in the Upstate and Greater Charlotte regions of South Carolina. By 2017, it had a A+ rating from the Better Business Bureau.

== Structure ==
Allen Tate Realtors is a subsidiary of The Allen Tate Company. Other subsidiaries include Allen Tate Mortgage, Allen Tate Insurance, Allen Tate Home Services, Allen Tate Relocation, BSI Builder Services and Master Title Agency.

== Community support ==
Allan Tate is a long-time supporter of organizations such as United Way, the Poe Center for Health Education in NC and to public education initiatives in the communities in which it operates.
