= Sugar Creek (North Carolina) =

Coordinates: 34.9434°N 80.8687°W

Sugar Creek, also called Sugaw Creek, is a small tributary of the Catawba River in North and South Carolina in the United States that drains the central portion of Charlotte, North Carolina, including Uptown Charlotte. Its takes its name from a Native American (probably Catawba) word sugaw said to mean "collection of huts" (compare Catawba suk, "house"), which was anglicized Sugar in the name of the street which runs by the creek (Sugar Creek Road) and Sugaw in the name of Sugaw Creek Park and the Presbyterian church located by it.

During the Battle of Charlotte in the American Revolutionary War, as William Richardson Davie's forces withdrew from Charlotte on 26 September 1780, captain Joseph Graham was wounded at Sugaw Creek but survived and went on to fight again at the Battle of Cowan's Ford.

For a time, effluent from Charlotte's sewers and industries was dumped into the creek.

== See also ==
- List of rivers of North Carolina
