= Carolina Place Mall =

Shopping mall in Pineville, North Carolina

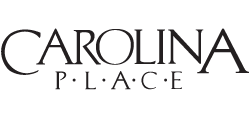

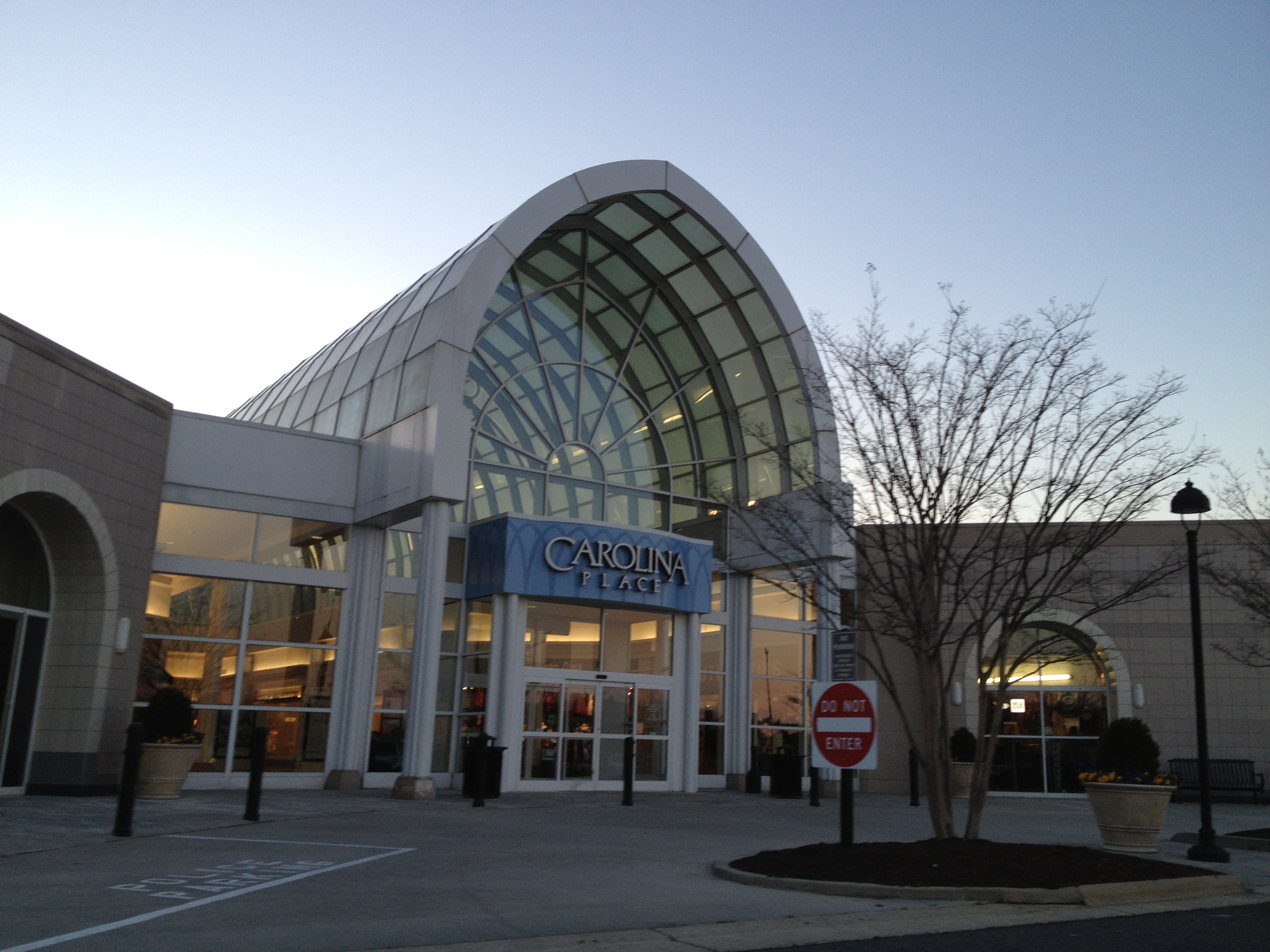
- Entrance to Carolina Place Mall
- Location: Pineville, North Carolina, U.S.
- Coordinates: 35.08241°N 80.87663°W
- Address: 11025 Carolina Place Parkway
- Opened: 1991
- Developer: Carter & Associates, Atlanta
- Manager: GGP
- Owner: GGP
- Num. of stores: 120
- Num. of anchor tenants: 5
- Floor area: 1,200,000 sq ft (110,000 m^{2}) (GLA)
- Floors: 2 (3rd floor offices in Belk)

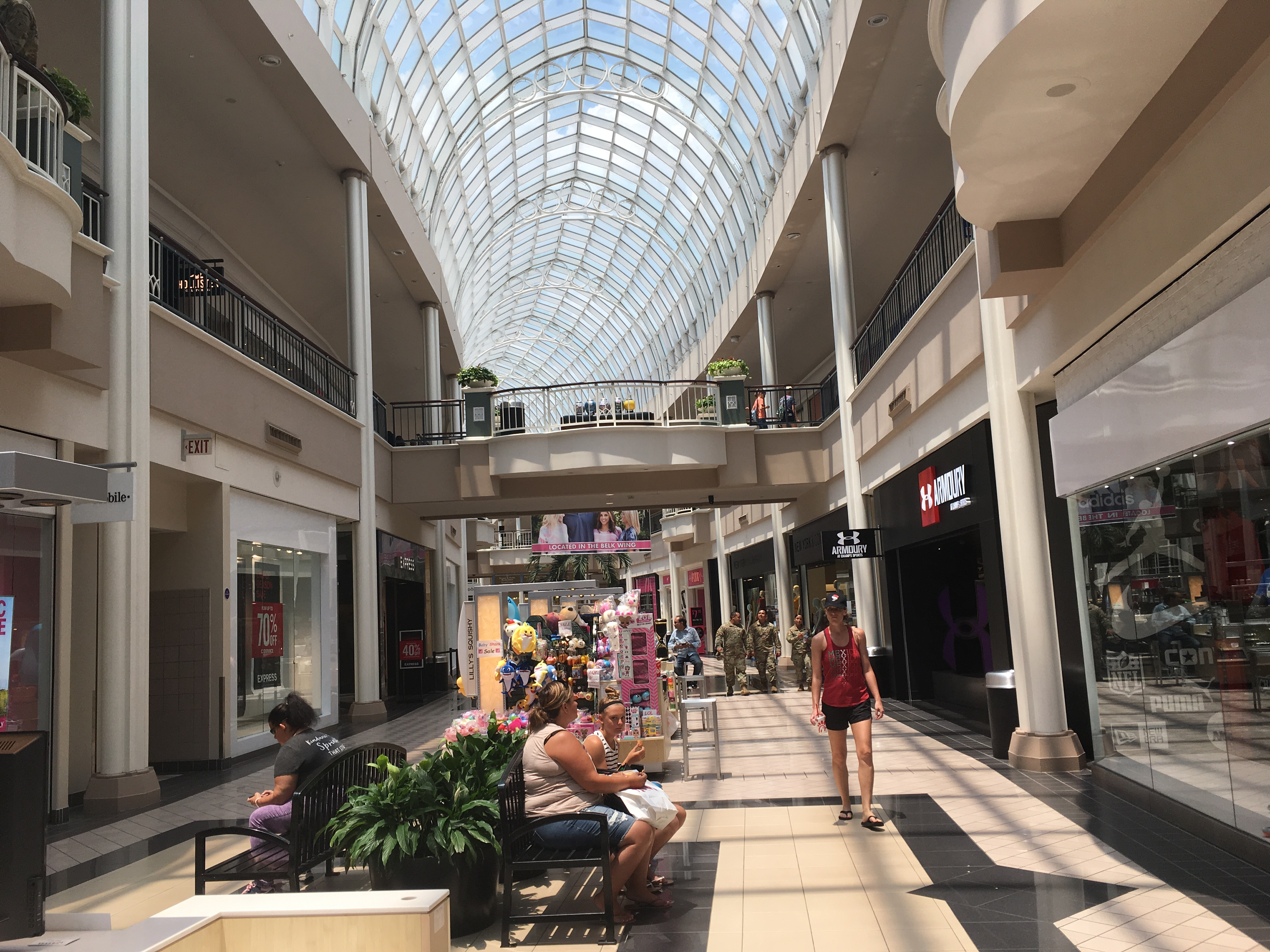
Interior of the Carolina Place Mall

Carolina Place (also referred to as Carolina Place Mall) is a shopping mall located in Pineville, North Carolina, a suburb of Charlotte. The 1,200,000-square-foot (110,000 m^{2}) GLA mall, in the shape of a curve, is anchored by Belk, a Dick's Sporting Goods, Golf Galaxy combo store, Dillard's, JCPenney, and Southern Lion.

== History ==
Carolina Place Mall was planned over 30 years before its opening in 1991, as the original location of SouthPark Mall. The Belk and Ivey's families bought the land for $8.5 million, but decided it was too far away from town. Ivey's eventually sold all the land to Belk after SouthPark was built, and in the mid 1980s the planning of Carolina Place, as it is known today, began.

The mall opened in 1991 with four anchor stores, Belk, Dillard's (Ivey's had just been bought by Dillard's), JCPenney and Sears. Several years previously, Belk closed its 75+ year-old store in uptown Charlotte, and JCPenney closed its 35-year-old store at Park Road Shopping Center. There were two more anchor pads available, one for Rich's and the other for Miller & Rhoads. However, neither of these stores joined the mall. In 1993, Hecht's (which had just bought Thalhimers) opened its doors as the 5th anchor store to the mall, making Carolina Place Mall the only mall in the region with 5 department store anchors at that time. In 1996, Incredible Universe and Garden Ridge opened outside the mall. In 1997, Incredible Universe closed and Sam's Club opened in its place. Garden Ridge became At Home in 2014.

The mall is managed by Brookfield Properties. Barnes & Noble, REI, and Harper's Restaurant joined the mall on its sixth anchor pad in an outdoor portion slated in August 2006. That same year, Hecht's was replaced by Macy's.

The second Charlotte area H&M opened its doors to the public on February 27, 2014.

Macy's closed in early 2017, following a sale of the store in an effort to improve profitability by reducing its brick-and-mortar footprint.

Dave & Buster's opened at the mall on October 16, 2017.

On October 15, 2018, it was announced that Sears would be closing as part of a plan to close 142 stores nationwide. The store closed in January 2019.

In May 2019, a Dick's Sporting Goods and Golf Galaxy combo store opened in the former Macy's.

On July 13, 2024, Southern Lion opened in the former Sears anchor. This is the first retail location of its kind. Southern Lion is a home goods store set as a marketplace with over 150 vendors that sells a variety of goods.
