= Concord Mills =

Shopping mall in Cabarrus County, North Carolina, U.S.

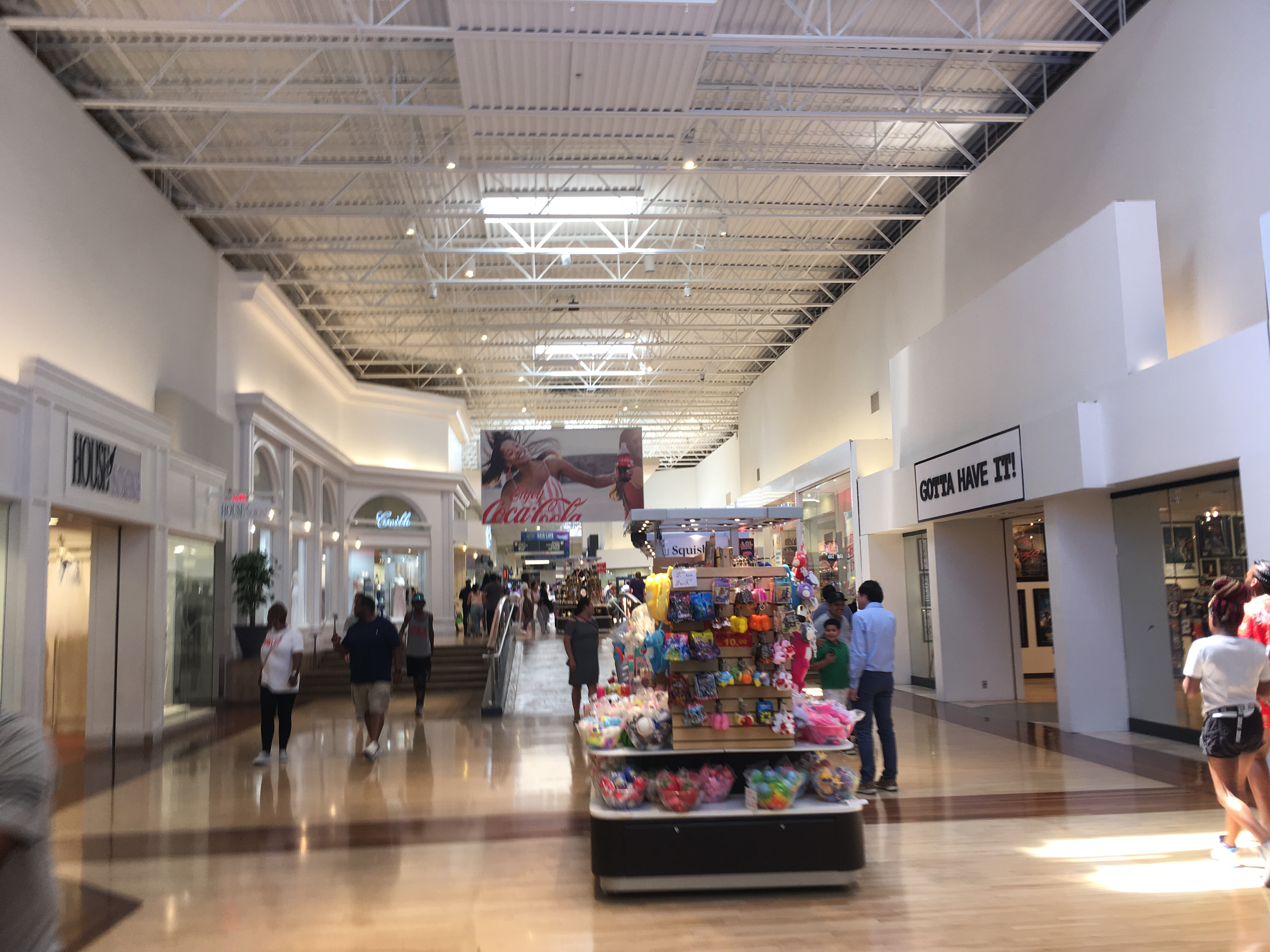
- Looking west from Entrance 6 (June 2019)
- Location: Concord, North Carolina, United States
- Coordinates: 35°22′10.04″N 80°43′20.60″W
- Opened: September 17, 1999; 27 years ago
- Renovated: 2016–2017 (Phase I); 2018–2019 (Phase II)
- Developer: The Mills Corporation; Simon Property Group; KanAm Group
- Manager: Simon Premium Outlets; The Mills: A Simon Company
- Owner: Simon Property Group (59.3%); KanAm Group (40.7%)
- Architect: Kiku Obata & Co.
- Num. of stores: 200+ (at peak; 182 as of July 2026)
- Num. of anchor tenants: 19 (at peak)
- Floor area: 1,362,404 square feet (126,571 m^{2}) (GLA)
- Floors: 1
- Parking: Parking lot
- Website: www.simon.com/mall/concord-mills/
- Building details
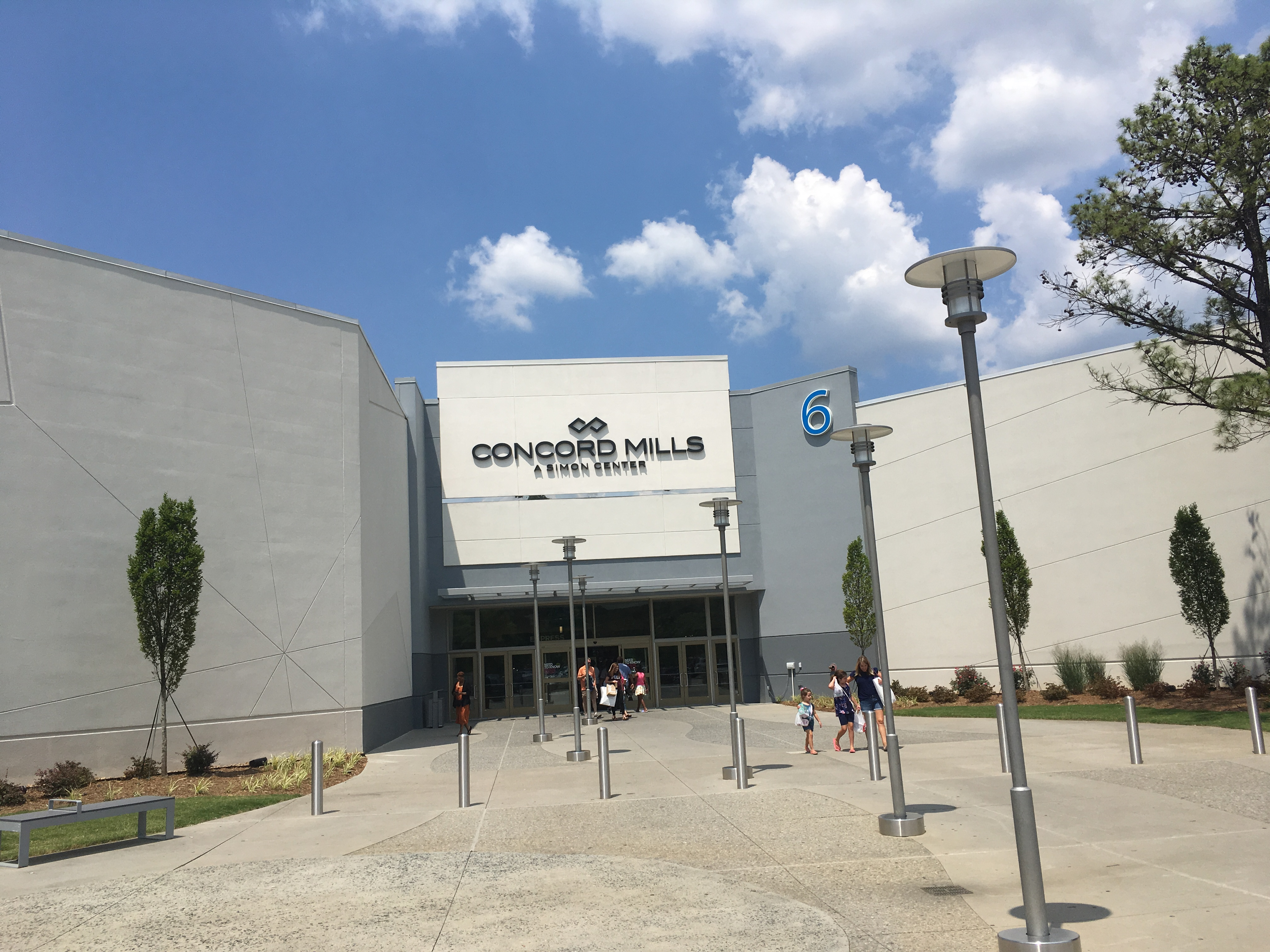
- Entry 6 (June 2019)

General information
- Status: Operational

Renovating team
- Architect: Bergmann Associates
- Renovating firm: Simon Property Group
- Main contractor: Graycor Construction Company

Concord Mills is a super-regional outlet mall in Concord, North Carolina. The mall is in Cabarrus County, just a few hundred feet from the Mecklenburg County border and Charlotte city limits, and about 12 miles (19 km) from Uptown Charlotte. It is one of two malls in Concord, the other being Carolina Mall.

The mall is a single-floor oval building with a floor area of 1,362,404 square feet (126,571 m^{2}). Primarily developed and formerly operated by the Mills Corporation, it is managed by Simon Property Group as of April 2007, which owns 59.3% of it. The remaining shares are handled by KanAm of Germany. It is North Carolina's largest single-site tourist attraction, attracting 17.6 million visitors in 2005. The mall is located about a mile from Charlotte Motor Speedway, close to Interstate 85.

== History ==
=== Mid-1990s–1999: Development and opening ===
The Arlington, Virginia-based Mills Corporation began planning on Concord Mills in the mid-1990s as a super-regional "shoppertainment" mall with colorful aesthetics, retail outlets, dining, and attractions.

Concord Mills was designed by the St. Louis, Missouri-based Kiku Obata & Company, and was developed as a joint venture with the German-based KanAm. The mall had its grand opening on September 17, 1999, with over 200 stores, and 65 payphones. Concord Mills made 4,000 jobs, $20 million+ in sales taxes per year, and $26 million in property taxes since 1997.

==== Design and architecture ====
Best Fest Food Court (October 2010)

The mall featured seven themed neighborhoods, including "Courts" in each one, such as Urban Stage Entertainment Court with nightlife aesthetics, Fashion Court, Style Court, Basketball Court, with rims and netting attached to the ceilin, Music Court, the NASCAR Racing Court with black-and-white checker flags and vehicle murals, another Entertainment Court, and the Runaway Court. The food court, known as Best Fest, originally featured North Carolina imagery, paying homage to the state.

=== 2002–2020: Simon Property Group ===
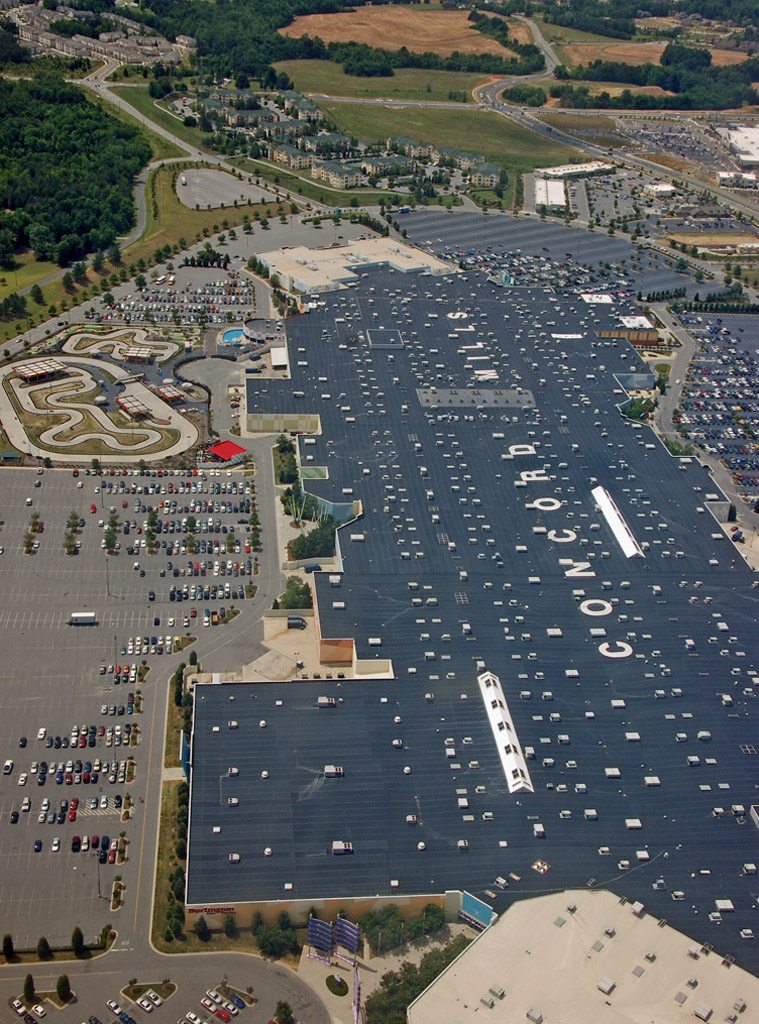
Aerial view (July 2010)

Simon DeBartolo Group held joint venture interests in Concord Mills, which they sold to KanAm in May 2002. However, The Mills Corporation, which was financially struggling by 2006, would be purchased by Simon Property Group and Farallon Capital Management, alongside its portfolio, for $1.64 billion. The acquisition was completed in April 2007, and the Mills Corp. was rebranded The Mills: A Simon Company. In March 2012, Simon acquired full control of the property's management by buying out Farallon's stake in the Mills portfolio for $1.5 billion.

Borders Books and Music closed in September 2011, as the chain went out of business in the U.S. Sea Life Aquarium opened on February 20, 2014, with 5,000 marine creatures, acting as an educational family-friendly attraction. In April 2016, Simon announced that Concord Mills would undergo an interior renovation starting in May that would deliver an improved shopping experience for families, tourists, and locals. This included the rebranding of the mall's food court into the Dining Pavilion, with new tile flooring, a white-and-gray color palette, updated LED lighting, and charging stations with Wi-Fi connectivity.

H. H. Gregg closed permanently, following the company's Chapter 11 bankruptcy and liquidation of all of its locations. Bonefish Grill, Outback Steakhouse and Chipotle Mexican Grill were announced to be coming to the mall. The first phase of the renovations was completed in January 2017. H&M opened in the spring of 2017, replacing Saks Off 5th, which closed in 2016. Phase II of the renovations, announced by Simon in March 2018, would modernize Concord Mills' exterior, including new signage, LED lighting, and the addition of a 70-foot (840 in)-tall tower sign visible from I-85. These renovations were slated for completion by August 2018, but were finished in April 2019 instead. Both renovation phases were designed by Bergmann Associates, and the main contractor was Graycor Construction Co.

On September 17, 2019, Concord Mills celebrated its 20th anniversary, and Simon held a three-week event titled "20 Days of Style", featuring special and promotional items from the mall's flagship stores and luxury stores. The payphones were replaced with over 50 cell phone charging stations. Concord Mayor Bill Dusch participated in the event, noting that the mall had grown to provide 4,000 jobs and generated over $20 million in annual sales tax for the region since its 1999 opening. On March 18, 2020, Simon temporarily closed all of its U.S. properties, including Concord Mills, due to the COVID-19 pandemic. The mall would reopen on May 8, 2020, under strict social distancing guidelines.

=== 2021–present ===
In December 2021, a major flyover bridge project was completed to alleviate the chronic traffic congestion on Concord Mills Boulevard, providing a direct route from Concord Mills to I-85. City officials are working on a strategic plan to add more sidewalks, bike paths, and pocket parks around the mall area to encourage a more pedestrian-friendly environment.

Simon Property Group implemented a Youth Supervision Policy on July 31, 2021, requiring minors under 18 to be occupied by an adult after 3 p.m. ET on Fridays and Saturdays. This was a direct response to teen disturbances in the area, initially reported by November 2020, which is when the weekend policy was announced by Simon. Primark opened in May 2023 as part as a global expansion effort.

Concord Mills celebrated its 25th anniversary in September 2024. Similar to the 2019 event, Dusch also pointed out how the mall had an economic impact in the Charlotte metropolitan area, stating:

Concord Mills has been a place where memories have been made for families of all ages since it opened. To see our favorite local hot spot thriving 25 years later, leaves me incredibly encouraged. We are excited to see what the next 25 years will bring!

— Concord Mayor Bill Dusch

In October 2024, Concord Mills was announced to add several stores and a children's play area, including BoxLunch, HEYDUDE, Cavender's Boot City, Hi Level Fashion and Kids Jungle Playground, all of which opened in July 2025. That month, the mall's Dave & Buster's was renovated to include:

- Darts and shuffleboard game suites.
- Human crane.
- A refreshed bowling area.
- Updated menu offerings.
- Revamped event spaces.

Starbucks Coffee and Juicy Body Goddess opened at the mall that same month.

Gap Factory opened in September 2025. Shake Shack announced on March 3, 2026, that it would debut on March 11. On March 20, 2026, Simon Property Group sued A Sneaker City for over $600,000 in unpaid rent and lease violations at Concord Mills.

In July 2026, JD Sports, Rally House, and Request Boutique opened at the mall. That month, Simon, under legal affiliate Mall at Concord Mills Limited Partnership, filed an eviction lawsuit at EZ Purchase LLC, doing business as Go Green CBD, for $104,770 in unpaid rent since June 2026.

== Concord Marketplace ==
Concord Marketplace (formerly Concord Mills Marketplace) is a power center adjacent to the Concord Mills outlet mall. It was also developed by the Mills Corp. and KanAm, and had its opening in October 2001.

Simon spun-off the property to Washington Prime Group (WPG) in May 2014, leading to the "Mills" part of the name to be dropped as Simon trademarked it. WPG then filed for Chapter 11 bankruptcy in June 2021, and as of April 2025, WPG was in the process of liquidating its retail operations, including Concord Mills Marketplace, which was expected to be completed by March 31, 2026.

As of April 2026, the property is expected to be sold to another owner, as it is past March 31. The mall is no longer on WPG's official website. However, it is unclear of what company owns the property now.

== Notable incidents ==
=== 2000 explosion ===
On August 21, 2000, a bulldozer damaged a 16-inch North Carolina Natural Gas line, causing a natural-gas explosion at a construction site nearby Concord Mills that shot flames and debris 100 feet into the air, according to Carolina Power & Light.

Shoppers immediately evacuated the shopping center, and everyone working at the construction site was viewed as accountable, according to Concord Fire Department spokeswoman Sherry Lee. One construction worker had first-degree burns from the incident. The Mills Corp. quickly clarified that the construction site was not part of the Concord Mills property.

=== Shooting at AMC Theatres ===
In March 2019, a man was shot by an 18-year-old male inside the AMC theater after a dispute over seating. This incident lead to yet another panic which resulted in a total evacuation. The suspect was arrested the following day and charged with assault with a deadly weapon and intent to kill.

=== 2019 shooting ===
In December 2019, a 13-year-old girl was struck and killed by a stray bullet after she attempted to escape a fight between a group of teenage males. Two other teenagers were also shot but did not receive life threatening injuries. In an unrelated case, the girl's cousin was himself murdered earlier the same hour.

One of the suspects in the shooting was arrested and charged with first-degree murder and felony riot on the Wednesday morning following the attack. Two days later, Police announced they had arrested another suspect. This was the first instance of murder on mall property.

=== 2026 traffic collision ===
On March 6, 2026, a serious collision occurred on I-85 southbound near the Concord Mills Boulevard exit. The crash resulted in two deaths and two injuries, causing significant traffic delays and the closure of multiple lanes for several hours.

== See also ==
- I-85 Corridor
- List of shopping malls in the United States
- St. Louis Mills, another Landmark Mills mall designed by Kiku Obata & Company
