= Pineville Commercial Historic District =

Historic district in North Carolina, United States

- U.S. National Register of Historic Places
- U.S. Historic district
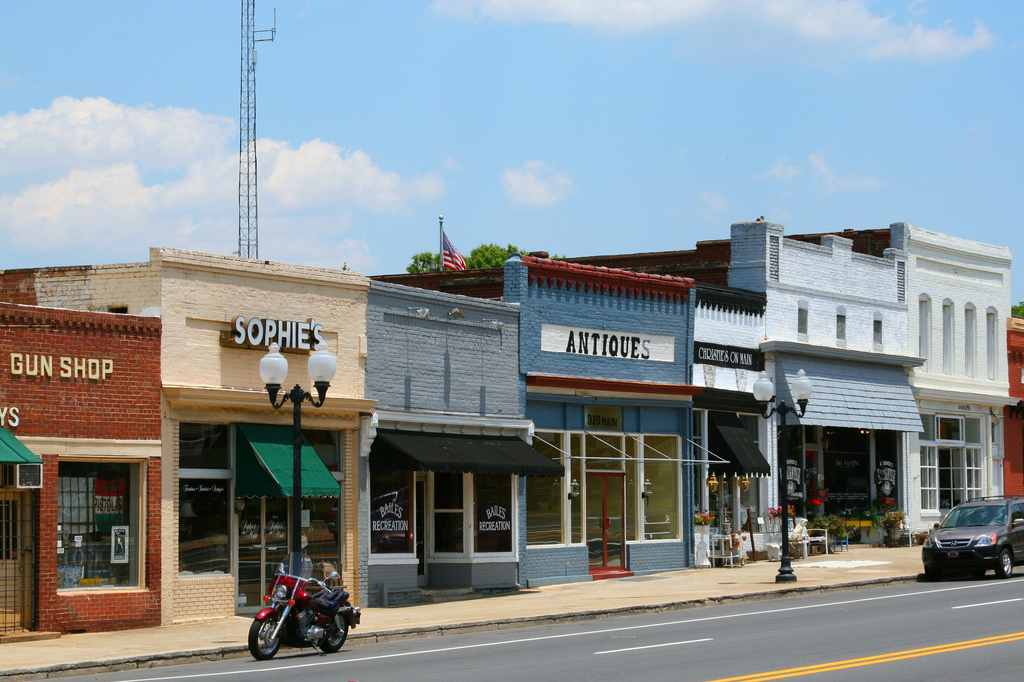
- Pineville Commercial Historic District, September 2012

- Location within North Carolina Location within the United States
- Location: 310-333 Main St. & 105-109 Dover St., Pineville, North Carolina
- Coordinates: 35°5′9″N 80°53′29″W
- Area: 4.5 acres (1.8 ha)
- Built: c. 1873
- NRHP reference No.: 11000510
- Added to NRHP: August 5, 2011

Pineville Commercial Historic District is a national historic district located at Pineville, Mecklenburg County, North Carolina. The district encompasses 15 contributing buildings in the central business district of Pineville. It was developed between about 1873 and 1960 and consists of contiguous rows of one-story and two-story, brick commercial buildings. Notable buildings include Younts General Store (c. 1873), Pineville Loan and Savings Bank (c. 1910), Yandell Hotel and Grocery Building (1925), and McCoy Barbershop/Pineville Post Office (1955).

It was added to the National Register of Historic Places in 2011.
