= Charlotte Mecklenburg Library =

Public library system in North Carolina, US

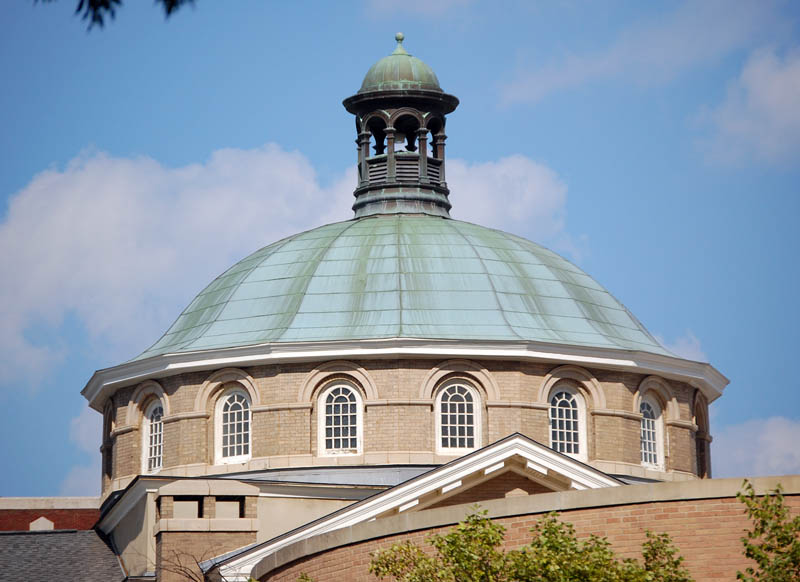
- 35°13′43.32″N 80°50′25.98″W
- Location: Mecklenburg County, North Carolina, United States
- Type: Public
- Established: 1903
- Branches: 21

Collection
- Items collected: Books, e-books, streaming movies and music, audiobooks, language programs, digital resources (databases, newspapers, journals, research, etc.), free Wi-Fi, outreach programs, and community partnerships

Access and use
- Access requirements: Residence in Mecklenburg County (annual fee for out of county customers)
- Circulation: 6.3M materials
- Population served: approximately one million citizens
- Members: 700,000 active cardholders

Other information
- Director: Angie Myers (interim)
- Employees: 490 staff members (full time and part-time)
- Website: www.cmlibrary.org

The Charlotte Mecklenburg Library (previously the Public Library of Charlotte and Mecklenburg County) is the public library system of the city of Charlotte and Mecklenburg County in North Carolina, United States.

Charlotte Mecklenburg Library serves a community of approximately one million citizens in the city of Charlotte and the towns of Matthews, Pineville, Mint Hill, Davidson, Cornelius and Huntersville – all located in Mecklenburg County, North Carolina.

== History ==
=== Early history ===
Andrew Carnegie donated $25,000 to establish a public library in Charlotte in 1901. In early 1904, the city aldermen bought a lot at the corner of Brevard and East 2nd streets for a separate library for African Americans, the first of its kind in North Carolina. Although only six blocks from the Carnegie Library, it was in the heart of the Brooklyn neighborhood, the black city within the city of Charlotte where many black churches and most black-owned businesses and professional offices were located. It operated independently at first, and after 1929 as a branch of the public library system, before closing in 1961.

=== Growth of the library system ===
The library system and the region grew tremendously in this period. The new, architecturally modern Main Library expanded its services to include a Carolina Room for local history and genealogy. In 1956, the library stopped segregating its customers by race and opened its services to all on an equal basis.

Under the leadership of, among others, Hoyt R. Galvin (1940-1971) and Robert E. Cannon (1986–2003), the library added more branches, inaugurated a literary festival, remodeled the 1956 Main Library building, and brought its catalog online. It continued to grow into the 21st century, constructing the ImaginOn branch as a joint venture with the Children's Theatre of Charlotte.

=== The modern library ===
The economic recession of 2009–2011 brought significant budget reductions, resulting in employee layoffs, the closure of four library branches, reduced hours and services at all remaining locations, and the consolidation of several support functions with Mecklenburg County. It was from this challenging time that the Library, County and community leaders found new ways to collaborate to meet the mutual goal of providing Mecklenburg County residents with the resources they needed. Today the library's 20 locations include a Main Library, an innovative library for children and teens called ImaginOn, and a network of branch libraries throughout Mecklenburg County. Throughout the system, the library provides free and open access to its physical and electronic collections and information, as well as to its services for people of all ages.

In April 2025, Charlotte Mecklenburg Library CEO Marcellus "MT" Turner resigned, and Angie Myers assumed the role of interim CEO.

== List of Branches ==
Branch Name	Municipality	Address
Allegra Westbrooks Regional	Charlotte	2412 Beatties Ford Rd, Charlotte, NC 28216
Cornelius	Cornelius	21105 Catawba Ave, Cornelius, NC 28031
Davidson	Davidson	119 S Main St, Davidson, NC 28036
Founders Hall	Charlotte	100 N Tryon Street, Suite 290, Charlotte, NC 28202
Hickory Grove	Charlotte	5935 Hickory Grove Rd, Charlotte, NC 28215
ImaginOn: The Joe & Joan Martin Center	Charlotte	300 E 7th St, Charlotte, NC 28202
Independence Regional	Charlotte	6000 Conference Dr, Charlotte, NC 28212
Main	Charlotte	310 North Tryon Street, Charlotte, NC 28202
Matthews	Matthews	230 Matthews Station St, Matthews, NC 28105
Mint Hill	Mint Hill	6840 Matthews-Mint Hill Rd, Mint Hill, NC 28227
Mountain Island	Charlotte	4420 Hoyt Galvin Way, Charlotte, NC 28214
Myers Park	Charlotte	1361 Queens Rd, Charlotte, NC 28207
North County Regional	Huntersville	16500 Holly Crest Ln, Huntersville, NC 28078
Pineville	Pineville	505 Main St #100, Pineville, NC 28134
Plaza Midwood	Charlotte	1623 Central Ave, Charlotte, NC 28205
South Boulevard	Charlotte	4429 South Blvd, Charlotte, NC 28209
South County Regional	Charlotte	5801 Rea Rd, Charlotte, NC 28277
SouthPark Regional	Charlotte	7015 Carnegie Blvd, Charlotte, NC 28211
Steele Creek	Charlotte	13620 Steele Creek Rd, Charlotte, NC 28273
Sugar Creek	Charlotte	4045 North Tryon Street, Suite A, Charlotte, NC 28206
University City Regional	Charlotte	5528 Waters Edge Village Drive, Charlotte, NC 28262
West Boulevard	Charlotte	2157 West Blvd, Charlotte, NC 28208

== See also ==
- 23 Things, an educational program created by the technology director of this library
