= Mecklenburg County, North Carolina =

County in the United States

- County
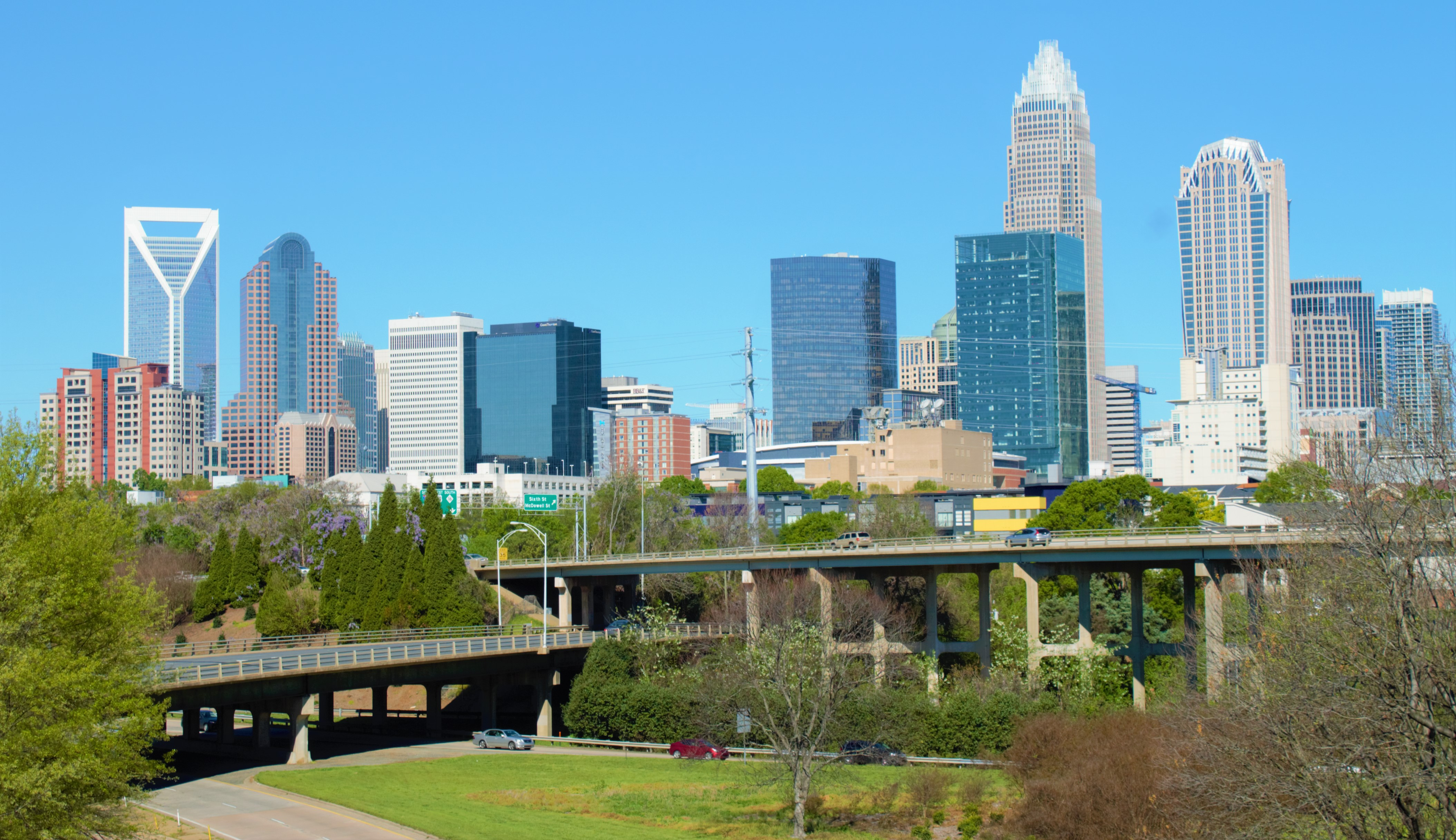
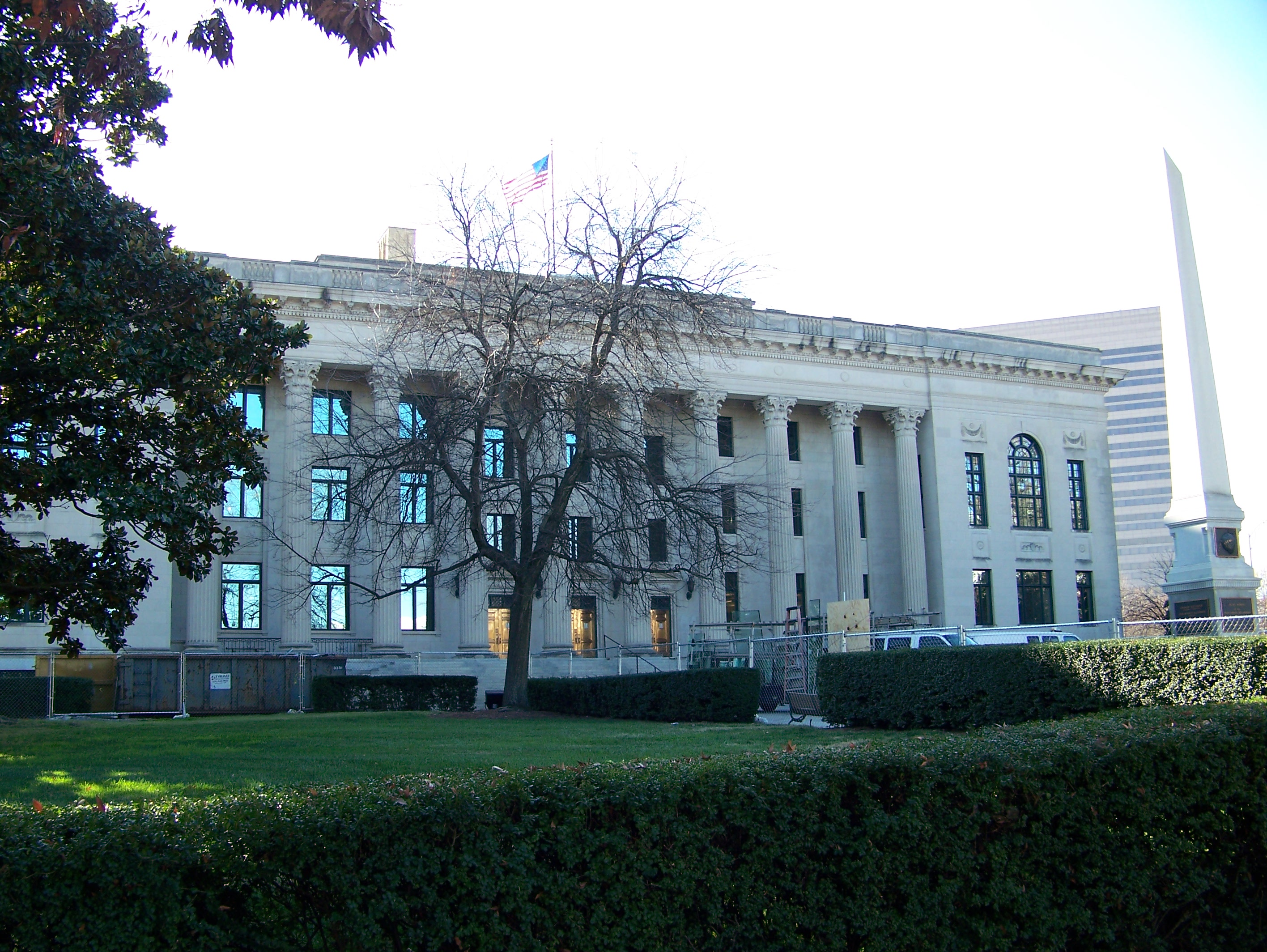
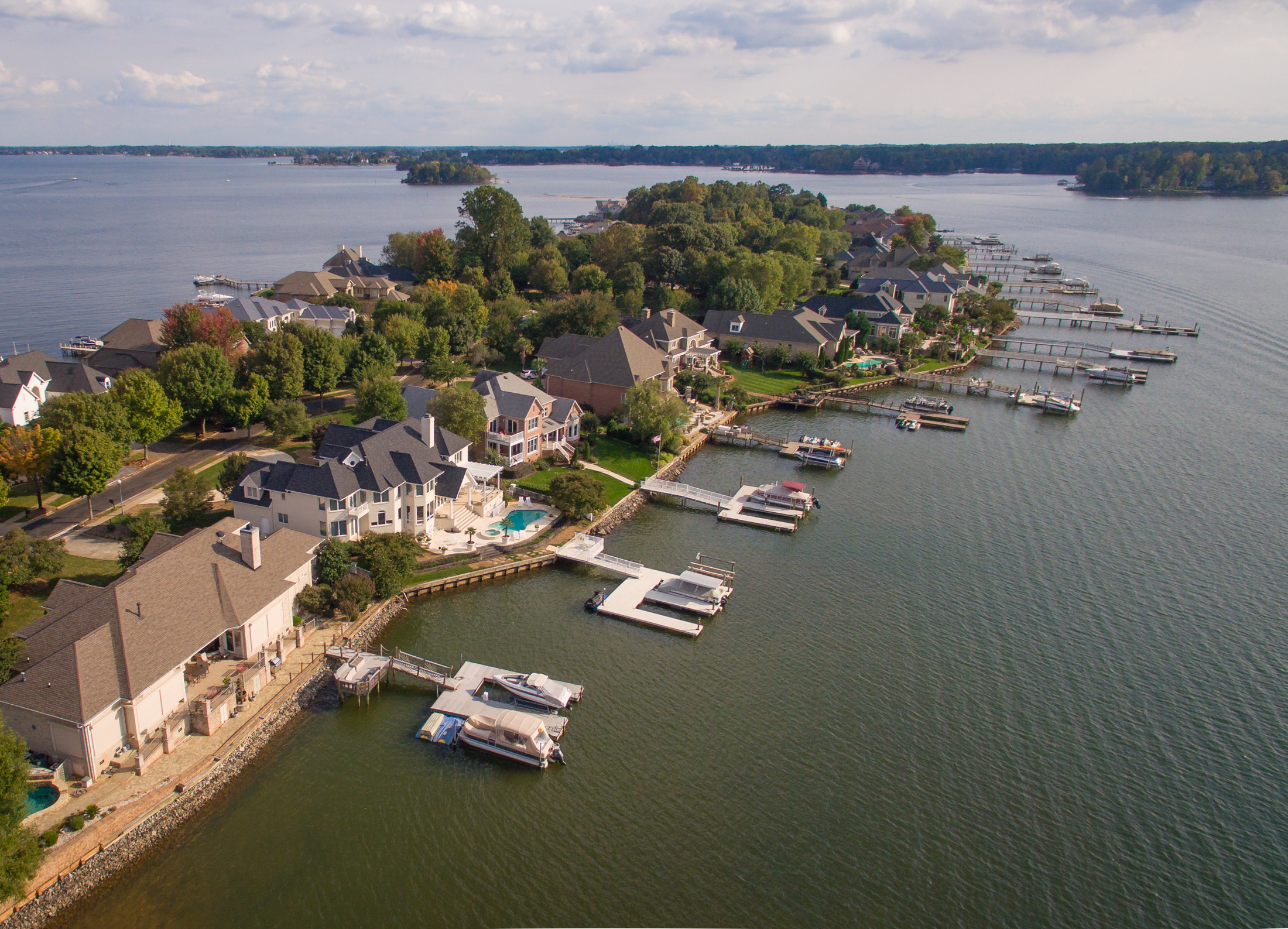
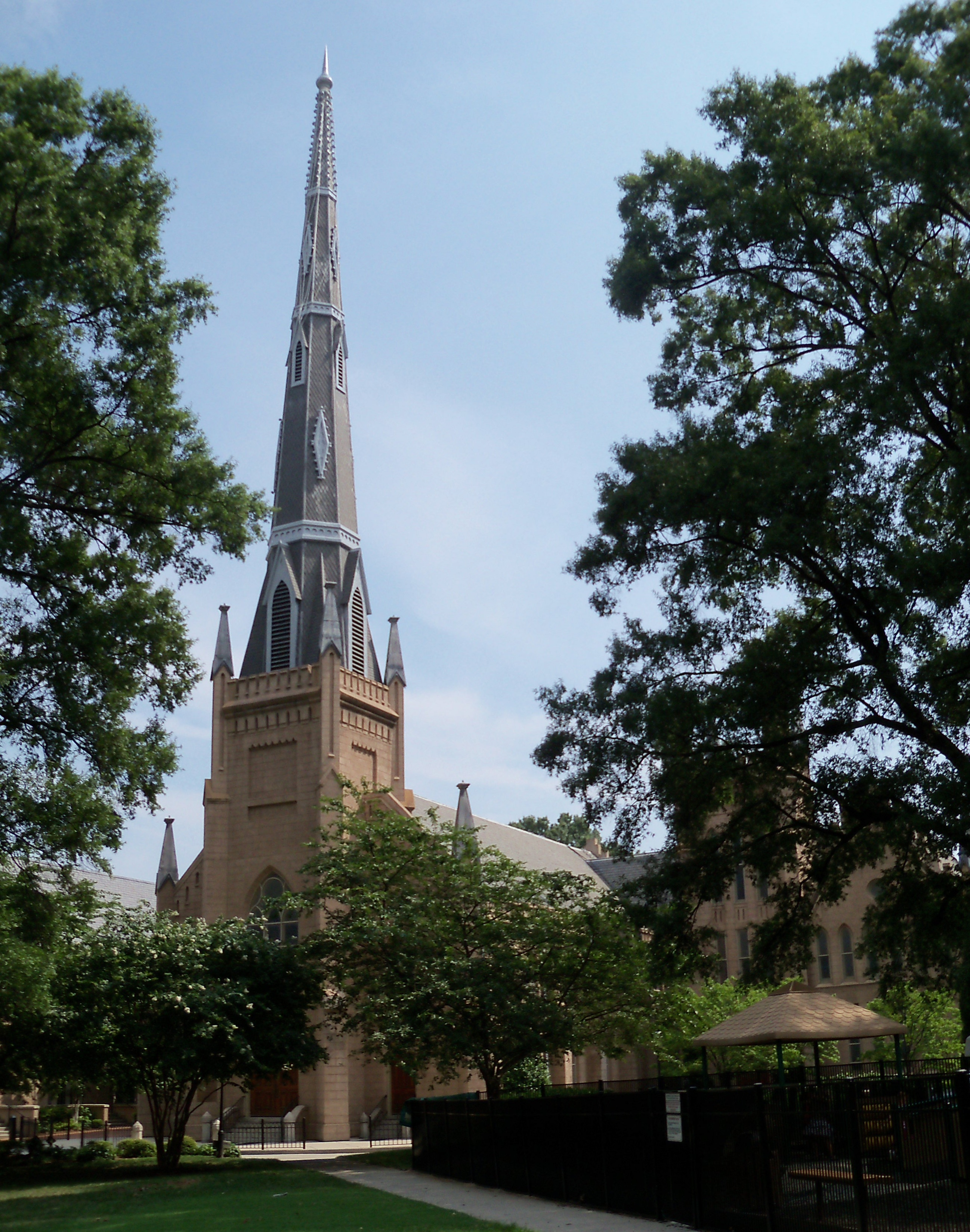
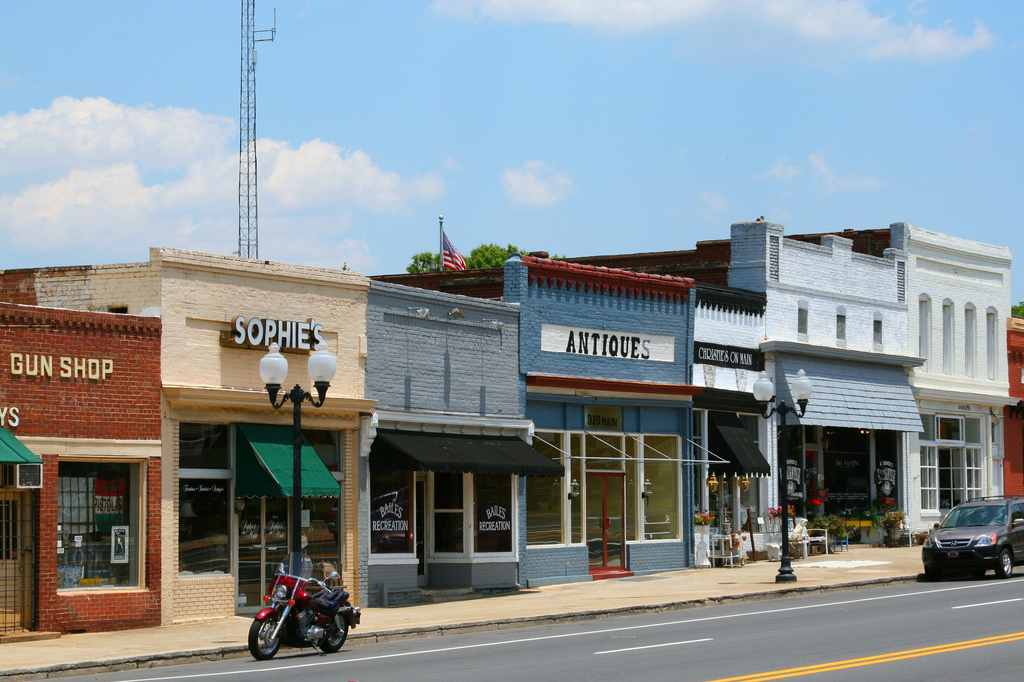
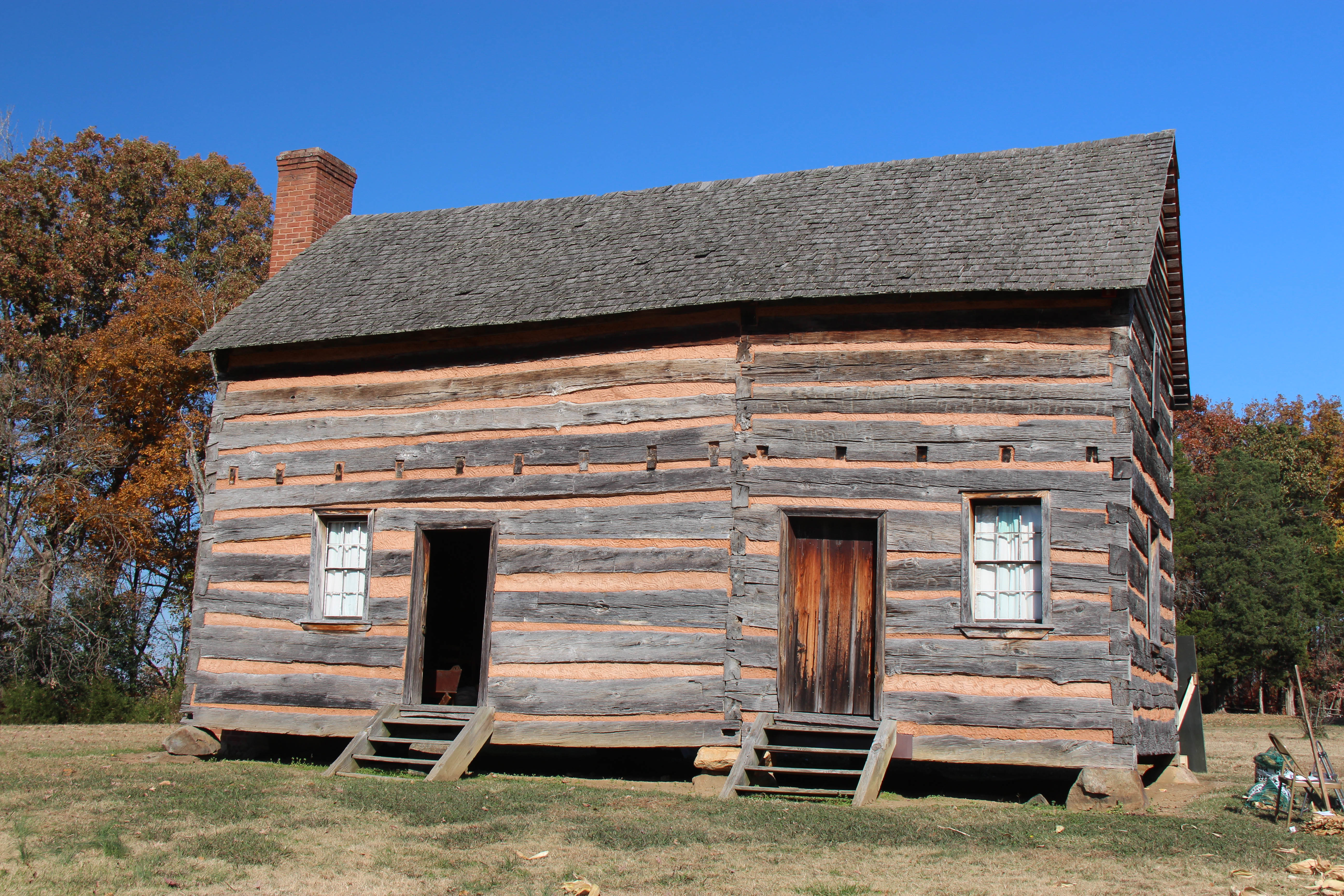
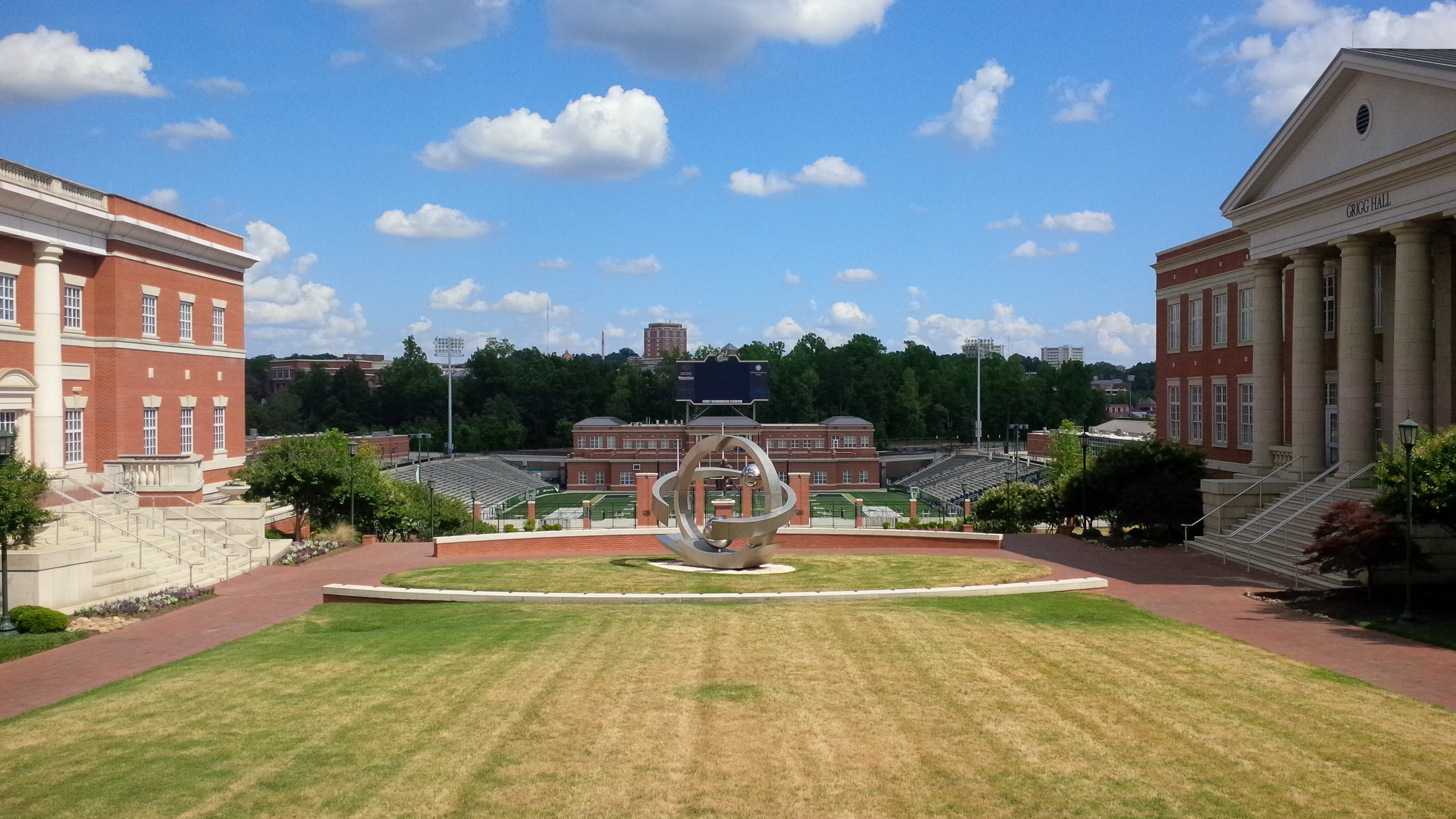
- Uptown Charlotte skyline Old Mecklenburg County Courthouse Governors Island on Lake Norman First Presbyterian Church Pineville Historic District President James K. Polk Historic Site Charlotte Research Institute campus at UNC Charlotte

- Flag Seal
- Nickname: Meck County
- Location within the U.S. state of North Carolina
- Interactive map of Mecklenburg County, North Carolina
- Coordinates: 35.25°N 80.83°W
- Country: United States
- State: North Carolina
- Founded: December 11, 1762
- Named for: Charlotte of Mecklenburg-Strelitz
- Seat: Charlotte
- Largest municipality: Charlotte

Area
  - Total: 546.09 sq mi (1,414.4 km^{2})
  - Land: 523.61 sq mi (1,356.1 km^{2})
  - Water: 22.48 sq mi (58.2 km^{2}) 4.12%

Population (2020)
  - Total: 1,115,482
  - Estimate (2025): 1,233,383 ▲
  - Density: 2,130.4/sq mi (822.54/km^{2})
- Demonym: Mecklenburger

GDP
  - Total: $186.114 billion (2024)
- Time zone: UTC−5 (Eastern)
  - Summer (DST): UTC−4 (EDT)
- Congressional districts: 8th, 12th, 14th
- Website: www.mecknc.gov

Mecklenburg County (/ˈmɛklənˌbɜːrɡ/) is a southwestern county in the U.S. state of North Carolina. As of the 2020 census, the population was 1,115,482, making it the second-most populous county in North Carolina (after Wake County). Its county seat is Charlotte, the state's largest municipality.

Mecklenburg County is the central county of the Charlotte-Concord-Gastonia, NC-SC Metropolitan Statistical Area. On September 12, 2013, it was estimated the county surpassed one million residents. It was the first county in the Carolinas to surpass one million in population.

Like its seat, the county is named after Charlotte of Mecklenburg-Strelitz, Queen of the United Kingdom (1761–1818), whose name is derived from the region of Mecklenburg in Germany. It was named for Mecklenburg Castle (Mecklenburg meaning "large castle" in Low German) in the village of Dorf Mecklenburg.

== History ==
Before the arrival of European settlers, the area that is now Mecklenburg County was populated by the Catawba people. European settlers first arrived in about 1740.

Mecklenburg County was formed by English colonists in 1762 from the western part of Anson County, both in the Piedmont section of the state. It was named in commemoration of the marriage of King George III to Charlotte of Mecklenburg-Strelitz, for whom the county seat Charlotte is named. Due to unsure boundaries, a large part of south and western Mecklenburg County extended into areas that would later form part of the state of South Carolina. In 1768, most of this area (the part of Mecklenburg County west of the Catawba River) was designated Tryon County, North Carolina.

Determining the final boundaries of these "western" areas between North and South Carolina was a decades-long process. As population increased in the area following the American Revolutionary War, in 1792 the northeastern part of Mecklenburg County was taken by the North Carolina legislature for Cabarrus County. Finally, in 1842 the southeastern part of Mecklenburg County was combined with the western part of Anson County to form Union County.

The Mecklenburg Declaration of Independence was allegedly signed on May 20, 1775, and if the document is genuine, Mecklenburg County was the first part of the Thirteen Colonies to declare independence from Great Britain. The "Mecklenburg Resolves" were adopted on May 31, 1775. Mecklenburg continues to celebrate the declaration each year in May, the date of which is included on the flag of North Carolina.

The first gold rush in the United States, the Carolina Gold Rush, began after a 12-year-old boy named Conrad Reed discovered a gold nugget in a stream in neighboring Cabarrus County. Many miners and merchants began settling in the county during that time. The first United States branch mint was established in 1837 in Charlotte and continued operations until 1913. The original building was moved from its original site and redeveloped as a museum.

In 1917, during World War I, Camp Greene was established west of Charlotte as an army training camp. In 1919, after the end of WWI, it was decommissioned. Around the 1930s and 1940s, the population began to rapidly increase. During this time, Carolinas Medical Center and Charlotte College (now the University of North Carolina at Charlotte) were built. Lake Norman was also completed in 1964, after a five-year construction period.

In the mid-20th century, the county continued to see rapid growth. Many new government buildings were constructed, and Charlotte Douglas International Airport was expanded in 1954. By 1960, a quarter million people were living in the county, with the population reaching half a million by 1990. A proposal to form a consolidated city-county government with Charlotte was considered, but voted down by residents in 1971. The metropolitan statistical area now includes 11 counties in both North Carolina and South Carolina, and had an estimated combined population of 2,805,115 in 2023.

In mid-2020, the county was the site of the 2020 Colonial Pipeline oil spill, wherein about 2,000,000 U.S. gal (7,600,000 L) of gasoline leaked from the Colonial Pipeline in the Oehler Nature Preserve near Huntersville. It is one of the largest gasoline spills in U.S. history, and cleanup efforts are expected to last for several years.

== Geography ==
According to the U.S. Census Bureau, the county has a total area of 546.09 square miles (1,414.4 km^{2}), of which 523.61 square miles (1,356.1 km^{2}) is land and 22.48 square miles (58.2 km^{2}) (4.12%) is water.

=== State and local protected areas/sites ===
- Carolina Raptor Center
- Charlotte Museum of History
- Historic Latta Place
- Historic Rural Hill/Nature Preserve
- Little Sugar Creek Greenway
- Mint Museum Randolph, uses the original Charlotte Mint building
- Mint Museum Uptown
- Oehler Nature Preserve
- President James K. Polk Historic Site

Nature preserves in Charlotte:

- Auten Nature Preserve
- Big Rock Nature Preserve
- Cowans Ford Wildlife Refuge
- Ferrelltown Nature Preserve
- Latta Nature Preserve
- McDowell Nature Preserve
- Possum Walk Nature Preserve
- Reedy Creek Nature Preserve
- Sherman Branch Nature Preserve
- Stevens Creek Nature Preserve

=== Major water bodies ===
- Catawba River
- Lake Norman
- Mountain Island Lake
- Rocky River

=== Adjacent counties ===
- Iredell County – north
- Cabarrus County – northeast
- Union County – southeast
- Lancaster County, South Carolina – south
- York County, South Carolina – southwest
- Gaston County – west
- Lincoln County – northwest

== Demographics ==
Historical population
Census	Pop.	Note	%±
1790	11,395		—
1800	10,317		−9.5%
1810	14,272		38.3%
1820	16,895		18.4%
1830	20,073		18.8%
1840	18,273		−9.0%
1850	13,914		−23.9%
1860	17,374		24.9%
1870	24,299		39.9%
1880	34,175		40.6%
1890	42,673		24.9%
1900	55,268		29.5%
1910	67,031		21.3%
1920	80,695		20.4%
1930	127,971		58.6%
1940	151,826		18.6%
1950	197,052		29.8%
1960	272,111		38.1%
1970	354,656		30.3%
1980	404,270		14.0%
1990	511,433		26.5%
2000	695,454		36.0%
2010	919,628		32.2%
2020	1,115,482		21.3%
2025 (est.)	1,233,383	▲	10.6%
U.S. Decennial Census; 1790–1960 1900–1990; 1990–2000 2010–2020

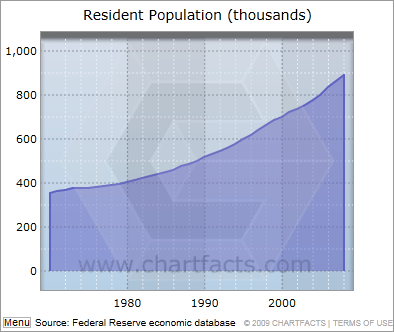
Population grew 2.5% per year from 1970 to 2008

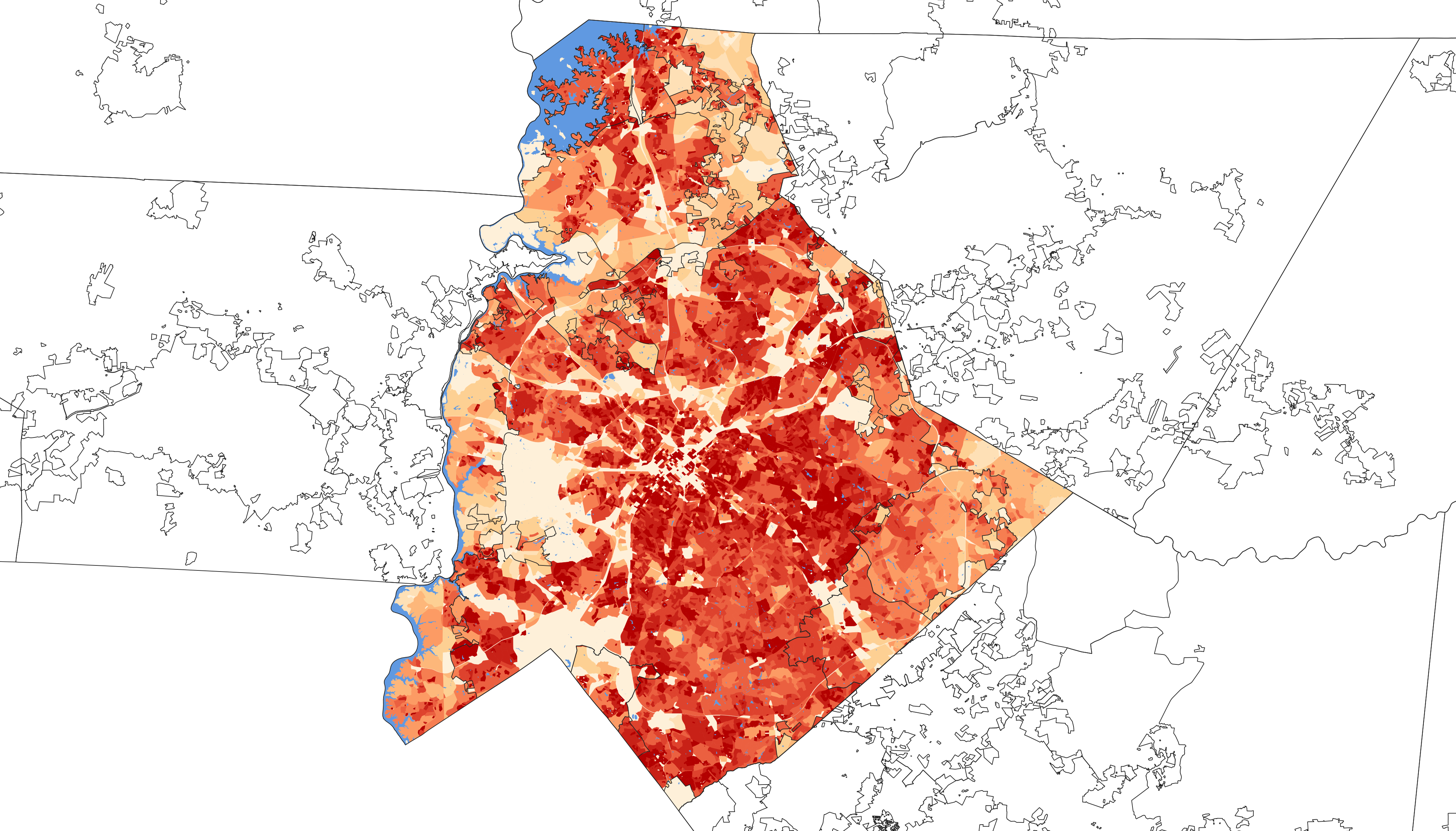
2020 population density of Mecklenburg County NC by census block

=== 2020 census ===
As of the 2020 census, the county had a population of 1,115,482. The median age was 35.1 years. 22.9% of residents were under the age of 18 and 11.8% of residents were 65 years of age or older. For every 100 females there were 92.8 males, and for every 100 females age 18 and over there were 89.9 males age 18 and over.

The racial makeup of the county was 46.7% White, 29.6% Black or African American, 0.6% American Indian and Alaska Native, 6.5% Asian, 0.1% Native Hawaiian and Pacific Islander, 8.7% from some other race, and 7.8% from two or more races. Hispanic or Latino residents of any race comprised 15.2% of the population.

99.2% of residents lived in urban areas, while 0.8% lived in rural areas.

There were 448,814 households in the county, of which 31.0% had children under the age of 18 living in them. Of all households, 41.3% were married-couple households, 20.0% were households with a male householder and no spouse or partner present, and 31.5% were households with a female householder and no spouse or partner present. About 30.5% of all households were made up of individuals and 7.8% had someone living alone who was 65 years of age or older.

There were 478,966 housing units, of which 6.3% were vacant. Among occupied housing units, 54.4% were owner-occupied and 45.6% were renter-occupied. The homeowner vacancy rate was 1.3% and the rental vacancy rate was 7.7%.

=== Racial and ethnic composition ===
Mecklenburg County, North Carolina – Racial and ethnic composition Note: the US Census treats Hispanic/Latino as an ethnic category. This table excludes Latinos from the racial categories and assigns them to a separate category. Hispanics/Latinos may be of any race.
Race / Ethnicity (NH = Non-Hispanic)	Pop 1980	Pop 1990	Pop 2000	Pop 2010	Pop 2020	% 1980	% 1990	% 2000	% 2010	% 2020
White alone (NH)	289,258	360,554	425,144	465,372	498,683	71.55%	70.50%	61.13%	50.60%	44.71%
Black or African American alone (NH)	105,892	133,866	192,403	278,042	324,832	26.19%	26.17%	27.67%	30.23%	29.12%
Native American or Alaska Native alone (NH)	1,412	1,869	2,130	2,843	2,730	0.35%	0.37%	0.31%	0.31%	0.24%
Asian alone (NH)	2,804	8,235	21,717	41,991	71,583	0.69%	1.61%	3.12%	4.57%	6.42%
Native Hawaiian or Pacific Islander alone (NH)	x	x	283	518	531	x	x	0.04%	0.06%	0.05%
Other race alone (NH)	942	216	1,022	2,407	6,889	0.23%	0.04%	0.15%	0.26%	0.62%
Mixed race or Multiracial (NH)	x	x	7,884	16,511	40,312	x	x	1.13%	1.80%	3.61%
Hispanic or Latino (any race)	3,962	6,693	44,871	111,944	169,922	0.98%	1.31%	6.45%	12.17%	15.23%
Total	404,270	511,433	695,454	919,628	1,115,482	100.00%	100.00%	100.00%	100.00%	100.00%

=== 2024 ACS ===
Recent data from the 2024 ACS 1-year estimates show that Mecklenburg County's population total is now 1,206,285, with 486,412 households. The percent of females in the population is 51.7%, and the percent of males is 48.3%, with a ±0.1% margin of error. Mecklenburg County has a larger female population than male population, as is the case worldwide, and, similarly to global trends, the gap between the male and female populations is decreasing. According to the 2020 ACS 5-year estimates, the female population was 568,717, and the male population was 526,453. This means the populations differ by 42,264. In 2024, the female population is estimated at 623,680, and the male population is estimated at 583,605. This means the populations differ by 40,075, a significantly smaller difference than in 2020. Though the 2020 estimates have a margin of error of ±119, and the 2024 estimates have a margin of error of ±283, the margins are not significant enough to undermine the general trend observed in the difference between the female and male populations.

Mecklenburg county has a significantly different racial profile than North Carolina on average. The ACS estimated 44.4% of Mecklenburg county identified as White, 29.3% Black or African American, 9.4% ‘Some Other Race’, 6.6% Asian, and 0.8% American Indian or Alaskan Native. Whereas the ACS estimated all of North Carolina identified as 60.8% White, 19.8% Black or African American, 5.6% ‘Some Other Race’, 3.6% Asian, 1.2% American Indian and Alaskan Native, and 0.1% Native Hawaiian and Other Pacific Islander.

=== 2000 census ===
At the 2000 census, there were 695,454 people, 273,416 households, and 174,986 families residing in the county. The population density was 1,322 people per square mile (510 people/km^{2}). There were 292,780 housing units at an average density of 556 units per square mile (215 units/km^{2}). The racial makeup of the county was 64.02% White, 27.87% Black or African American, 0.35% American Indian/Alaska Native, 3.15% Asian, 0.05% Pacific Islander, 3.01% from other races, and 1.55% from two or more races. 6.45% of the population were Hispanic or Latino of any race.

There were 273,416 households, out of which 32.10% had children under the age of 18 living with them, 47.70% were married couples living together, 12.40% had a female householder with no husband present, and 36.00% were non-families. 27.60% of all households were made up of individuals, and 5.90% had someone living alone who was 65 years of age or older. The average household size was 2.49 and the average family size was 3.06.

In the county, 25.10% of the population was under the age of 18, 9.70% was from 18 to 24, 36.40% from 25 to 44, 20.30% from 45 to 64, and 8.60% was 65 years of age or older. The median age was 33 years. For every 100 females there were 96.50 males. For every 100 females age 18 and over, there were 93.60 males.

The median income for a household in the county was $50,579, and the median income for a family was $60,608. Males had a median income of $40,934 versus $30,100 for females. The per capita income for the county was $27,352. About 6.60% of families and 9.20% of the population were below the poverty line, including 11.50% of those under age 18 and 9.30% of those age 65 or over.

== Law and government ==
Mecklenburg County is a member of the regional Centralina Council of Governments.

The county is governed by the Mecklenburg Board of County Commissioners (BOCC). The BOCC is a nine-member board made up of representatives elected from six single-member districts, and three at-large representatives elected by the entire county. This electoral structure favors at-large candidates who appeal to the majority population of the county. Each District has a population of approximately 165,000 individuals. All seats are partisan and are for 2-year terms (elections occur in even years). The current chair of the Mecklenburg BOCC is Mark Jerrell (D, District 4). The current vice chair is Leigh Altman (D, At-Large).

Members of the Mecklenburg County Commission are required by North Carolina State law to choose a chair and vice-chair once a year (at the first meeting of December). Historically, the individual elected was the 'top-vote-getter', typically one of three at-large members. In 2014 this unofficial rule was changed by the Board to allow any member to serve as Chair or vice-chair as long as they received support from 4 members plus their own vote.

The nine members of the Board of County Commissioners are:

- George Dunlap (D, District 3)
- Elaine Powell (D, District 1)
- Yvette Townsend-Ingram (D, At-Large)
- Leigh Altman (D, At-Large Vice Chair)
- Arthur Griffin (D, At-Large)
- Vilma Leake (D, District 2)
- Mark Jerrell (D, District 4 Chair)
- Laura Meier (D, District 5)
- Susan Rodriguez-McDowell (D, District 6)

=== Politics ===
United States presidential election results for Mecklenburg County, North Carolina
Year	Republican		Democratic		Third party(ies)	
Year	No.	%	No.	%	No.	%
1880	3,245	49.12%	3,361	50.88%	0	0.00%
1884	3,101	45.83%	3,666	54.17%	0	0.00%
1888	3,253	43.07%	4,206	55.69%	93	1.23%
1892	1,933	29.87%	3,881	59.97%	658	10.17%
1896	3,921	44.61%	4,714	53.63%	155	1.76%
1900	2,234	36.63%	3,786	62.09%	78	1.28%
1904	748	19.01%	3,142	79.87%	44	1.12%
1908	1,645	29.37%	3,926	70.09%	30	0.54%
1912	284	5.89%	3,967	82.27%	571	11.84%
1916	1,257	21.78%	4,508	78.11%	6	0.10%
1920	3,421	23.22%	11,313	76.78%	0	0.00%
1924	2,572	22.46%	8,443	73.73%	437	3.82%
1928	12,041	55.41%	9,690	44.59%	0	0.00%
1932	4,973	21.32%	18,167	77.90%	181	0.78%
1936	4,709	15.25%	26,169	84.75%	0	0.00%
1940	7,013	19.60%	28,768	80.40%	0	0.00%
1944	9,434	26.66%	25,950	73.34%	0	0.00%
1948	11,518	34.71%	14,353	43.25%	7,314	22.04%
1952	44,334	57.30%	33,044	42.70%	0	0.00%
1956	44,469	62.02%	27,227	37.98%	0	0.00%
1960	48,250	55.07%	39,362	44.93%	0	0.00%
1964	46,589	48.44%	49,582	51.56%	0	0.00%
1968	56,325	52.40%	31,102	28.93%	20,070	18.67%
1972	77,546	68.52%	33,730	29.80%	1,900	1.68%
1976	61,715	49.21%	63,198	50.40%	486	0.39%
1980	68,384	47.80%	66,995	46.83%	7,679	5.37%
1984	106,754	62.67%	63,190	37.10%	393	0.23%
1988	106,236	59.42%	71,907	40.22%	653	0.37%
1992	99,496	43.57%	97,065	42.50%	31,814	13.93%
1996	97,719	45.91%	103,429	48.59%	11,697	5.50%
2000	134,068	50.97%	126,911	48.25%	2,057	0.78%
2004	155,084	48.00%	166,828	51.63%	1,190	0.37%
2008	153,848	37.45%	253,958	61.82%	3,011	0.73%
2012	171,668	38.24%	272,262	60.65%	4,970	1.11%
2016	155,518	32.89%	294,562	62.29%	22,777	4.82%
2020	179,211	31.60%	378,107	66.68%	9,735	1.72%
2024	187,770	32.51%	376,454	65.19%	13,281	2.30%

Mecklenburg County was one of the first parts of North Carolina to break away from a Solid South voting pattern. It was a Republican-leaning swing county for most of the second half of the 20th century, supporting the GOP all but three times from 1952 to 2000. However, the county has strongly trended Democratic in the 21st century, particularly in federal and statewide elections. The expansion of the financial and business communities since the late 20th century attracted many newcomers from other areas of the country, with more diverse voting patterns. The more ethnically diverse core and northern sections of Charlotte trend Democratic, while wealthier and whiter suburban areas to the south of the city lean more Republican.

In 2004, John Kerry became only the fourth Democrat to carry Mecklenburg County since Harry Truman in 1948, and the third to win it with a majority since Franklin Roosevelt's last campaign in 1944. In 2008, the county swung dramatically to support Barack Obama, who won 60.8 percent of the county's vote, at the time the strongest showing for a Democrat in the county since Roosevelt's landslides. Obama's 100,100-vote margin in the county helped him become the first Democrat to carry North Carolina since 1976. At the same time, John McCain became the first Republican to win less than 40 percent of the county's vote since 1948.

Obama won the county almost as easily in 2012 despite losing statewide. The county swung even further in favor of Hillary Clinton in 2016, Joe Biden in 2020, and Kamala Harris in 2024, with all three beating Obama's 2008 total. However, Republicans continue to retain some strength in local races.

=== Courts and policing ===
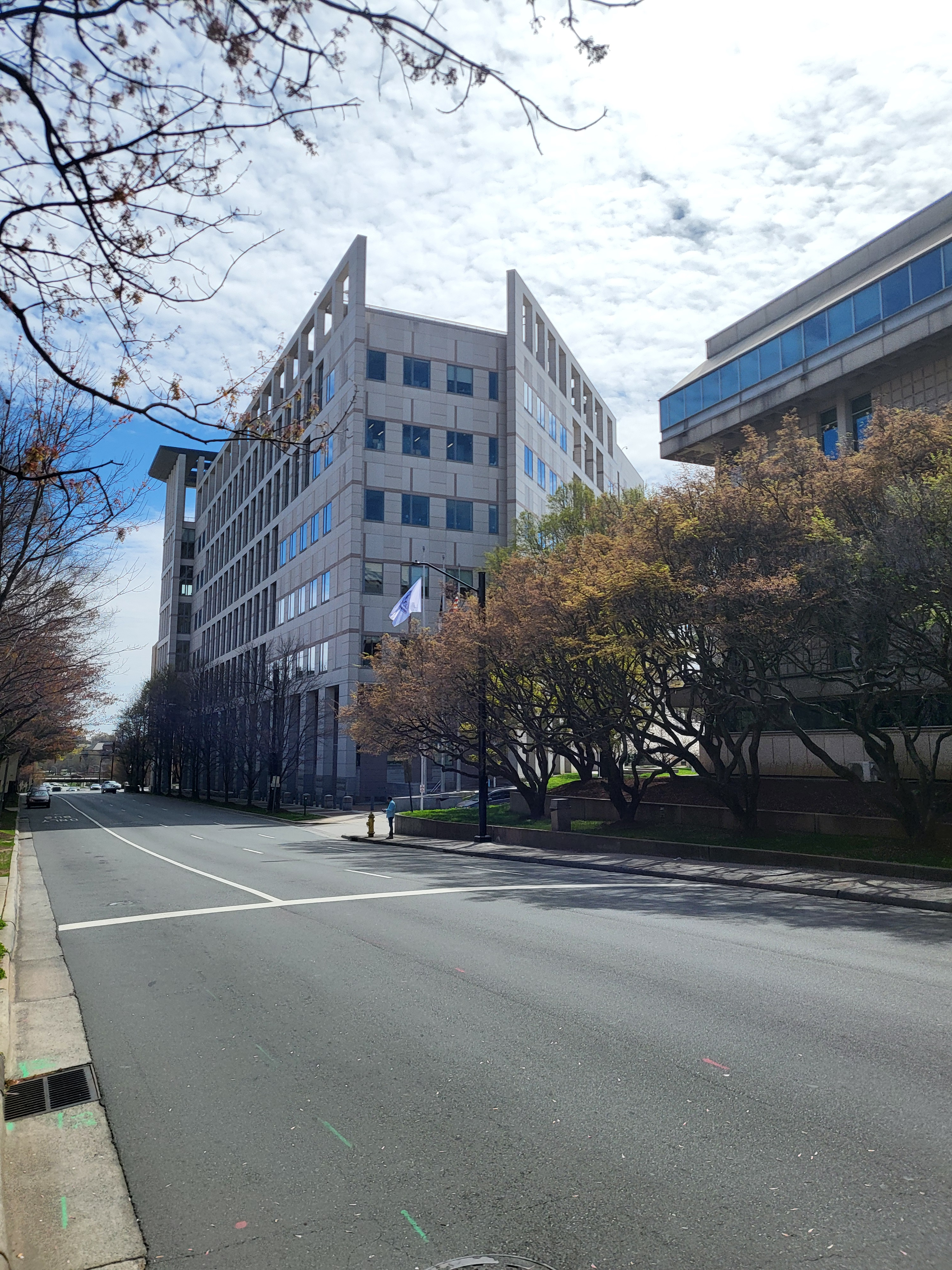
The Mecklenburg County Courthouse pictured in 2024.

Mecklenburg County is in District 26 of the North Carolina Judicial Branch. Mecklenburg County Courthouse is at 832 East Fourth Street in Charlotte. Since 2017, the District Attorney has been Spencer B. Merriweather III.

The post of 'High Sheriff' of Mecklenburg County dates back to 1763 and is mandated in the constitution of North Carolina. The county sheriff is elected for a four-year term and heads the Mecklenburg County Sheriff's Office. As of 2018, the sheriff is Garry L. McFadden, who has featured in a number of true crime documentaries.

== Economy ==
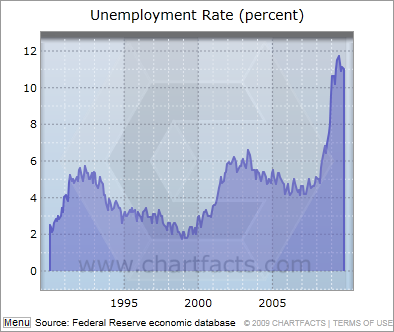
Data represents January 1990 to November 2009

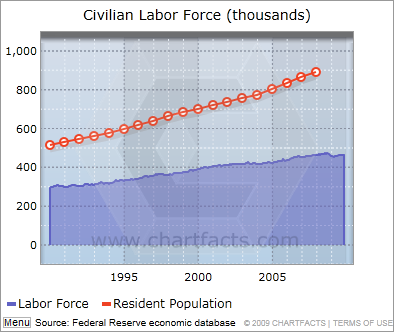
Data represents January 1990 to November 2009

The major industries of Mecklenburg County are banking, manufacturing, and professional services, especially those supporting banking and medicine. Mecklenburg County is home to ten Fortune 1000 companies.

Fortune 1,000 companies with headquarters in Mecklenburg County
	Name	Industry	2019 Revenue	Rank
1.	Bank of America	Banking	$110.6 billion	25
2.	Nucor	Metals	$25.1 billion	120
3.	Duke Energy	Utilities	$24.1 billion	126
4.	Sonic Automotive	Automotive retailing	$10.0 billion	316
5.	Brighthouse Financial	Insurance	$9.0 billion	342
6.	Sealed Air	Conglomerate	$4.7 billion	555
7.	Coca-Cola Consolidated	Food Processing	$4.7 billion	563
8.	JELD-WEN Holding	Building Products	$4.3 billion	590
9.	Albemarle	Chemicals	$3.4 billion	702
10.	SPX	Electronics	$2.1 billion	962

Wachovia, a former Fortune 500 company, had its headquarters in Charlotte until it was acquired by Wells Fargo for $15.1 billion. Wells Fargo maintains the majority of the former company's operations in Charlotte.

Goodrich Corporation, a former Fortune 500 company, had its headquarters in Charlotte until it was acquired by United Technologies Corporation for $18.4 billion. Charlotte is now the headquarters for UTC Aerospace Systems.

20 largest employers in Mecklenburg County, by number of employees in region (Q2 2018)
Name	Industry	Number of employees
1. Atrium Health	Health Care and Social Assistance	35,700
2. Charlotte-Mecklenburg Schools	Educational Services	18,495
3. Bank of America	Finance and Insurance	15,000
4. American Airlines	Transportation and Warehousing	11,000
5. Harris Teeter	Retail Trade	8,239
6. Duke Energy	Utilities	7,900
7. City of Charlotte	Public Administration	6,800
8. Mecklenburg County Government	Public Administration	5,512
9. YMCA of Greater Charlotte	Arts, Entertainment and Recreation	4,436
10. Carowinds	Arts, Entertainment and Recreation	4,100
11. University of North Carolina at Charlotte	Educational Services	4,000
11. United States Postal Service	Transportation and Warehousing	4,000
11. TIAA	Finance and Insurance	4,000
14. LPL Financial	Finance and Insurance	2,850
15. Central Piedmont Community College	Educational Services	2,700
16. Belk	Retail Trade	2,300
17. DMSI	Transportation and Warehousing	2,175
18. IBM	Professional Services	2,100
19. Robert Half International	Administrative and Support Services	2,000
19. Allstate Insurance	Finance and Insurance	2,000

== Transportation ==
=== Air ===
The county's primary commercial aviation airport is Charlotte Douglas International Airport in Charlotte.

=== Intercity rail ===
With twenty-five freight trains a day, Mecklenburg is a freight railroad transportation center, largely due to its place on the NS main line between Washington and Atlanta, and the large volumes of freight moving in and out of the county via truck.

Mecklenburg County is served daily by three Amtrak routes. The Crescent train connects Charlotte with New York, Philadelphia, Baltimore, Washington, Charlottesville, and Greensboro to the north, and Atlanta, Birmingham and New Orleans to the southwest.

The Carolinian train connects Charlotte with New York, Philadelphia, Baltimore, Washington, Richmond, Raleigh, Durham and Greensboro.

The Piedmont train connects Charlotte with Raleigh, Durham and Greensboro.

The Amtrak station is located at 1914 North Tryon Street. A new centralized multimodal train station, Gateway Station, has been planned for the city. It is expected to house the future LYNX Purple Line, the new Greyhound bus station, and the Crescent line that passes through Uptown Charlotte.

Mecklenburg County is the proposed southern terminus for the initial segment of the Southeast High Speed Rail Corridor operating between Charlotte and Washington, D.C. Currently in conceptual design, the SEHSR would eventually run from Washington, D.C. to Macon, Georgia.

=== Light rail and mass transit ===
Light rail service in Mecklenburg County is provided by LYNX Rapid Transit Services. Currently, the 19-mile (31 km) Lynx Blue Line runs from University of North Carolina at Charlotte, through Uptown Charlotte, to Pineville; build-out is expected to be complete by 2034. The CityLynx Gold Line, a 1.5-mile (2.4 km) streetcar line runs from Sunnyside Avenue, in Plaza-Midwood, through Uptown Charlotte, stopping at the Charlotte Transportation Center and future Charlotte Gateway Station, before continuing to French Street in Biddleville (Charlotte neighborhood), near the campus of Johnson C. Smith University.

Charlotte Area Transit System (CATS) bus service serves all of Mecklenburg County, including Charlotte, and the municipalities of Davidson, Huntersville, Cornelius, Matthews, Pineville, and Mint Hill.

The Lynx Silver Line is a proposed 29-mile (47 km) east-west light rail line that would connect the outlying cities and towns of Belmont, Matthews, Stallings and Indian Trail to Uptown Charlotte and the Charlotte Douglas International Airport. Originally setup as two separate projects known as the Southeast Corridor and West Corridor, they were merged in 2019 by the Metropolitan Transit Commission. The tentative opening date in 2037.

=== Freight ===
Mecklenburg's manufacturing base, its central location on the Eastern Seaboard, and the intersection of two major interstates in the county have made it a hub for the trucking industry. Also located in the county is the Inland Port of Charlotte, which is a major rail corridor for CSX rail lines.

=== Major highways ===
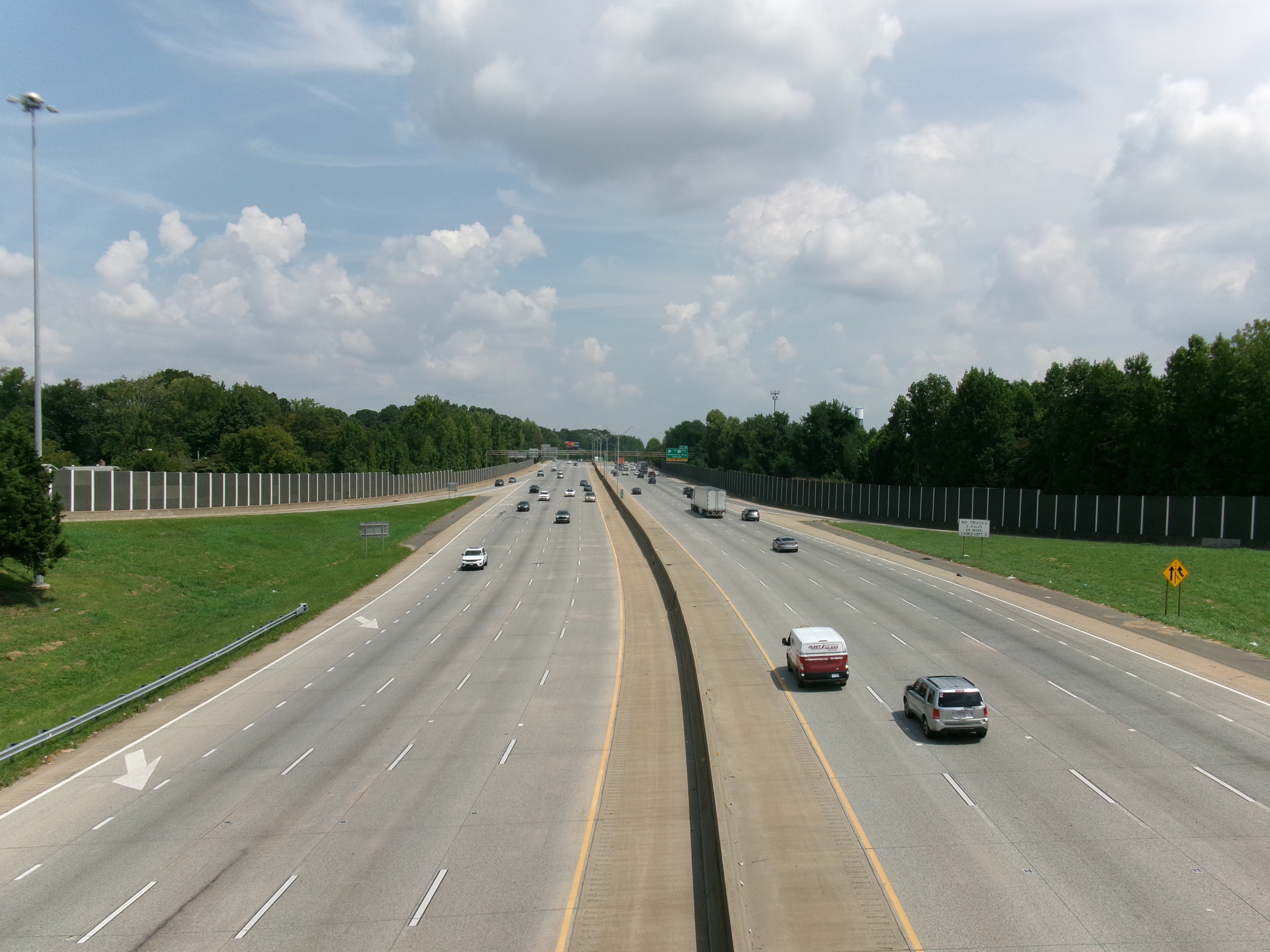
I-85 northbound past Glenwood Drive in Charlotte

- I-77
- I-85
- I-277
- I-485
- US 21
- US 29
- US 74
- US 521
- NC 16
- NC 24
- NC 27
- NC 49
- NC 51
- NC 73
- NC 115
- NC 160
- NC 218

== Education ==
=== School system ===
The Charlotte-Mecklenburg Schools (CMS) serves the entire county; however, the State of North Carolina also has approved a number of charter schools in Mecklenburg County (independently operated schools financed with tax dollars).

=== Colleges and universities ===
==== Current ====
- Central Piedmont Community College
- Davidson College
- Johnson C. Smith University
- Johnson & Wales University
- Pfeiffer University
- Queens University of Charlotte
- Union Presbyterian Seminary
- University of North Carolina at Charlotte
- Wake Forest University Charlotte Center

==== Former ====
- King's College

=== Libraries ===
The Charlotte Mecklenburg Library is the public library that serves residents of Mecklenburg County. Library cards from any branch can be used at all locations and to access digital resources. The library has an extensive collection (over 1.5 million items) of fiction and non-fiction books, eBooks and audiobooks (through Libby, Hoopla, and NC Live), and online databases. The Archives and Special Collections department houses archival collections related to Mecklenburg County, materials related to state and local government and culture, genealogy, and manages the Robinson-Spangler Carolina Room.

The Billy Graham Library contains the papers and memorabilia related to the career of the well-known 20th century evangelist, Billy Graham. It is open for tours, but does not allow materials to be checked out.

== Healthcare ==
Two major healthcare providers exist within Mecklenburg County, Atrium Health, and Novant Health. The two healthcare systems combined offer 14 emergency departments throughout Mecklenburg County, including a psychiatric emergency department and two children's emergency departments. Two hospitals in the region offer trauma services with one level I trauma center and one level II. Atrium Health, legally Charlotte-Mecklenburg Hospital Authority, is the public hospital authority of the county.

The residents of Mecklenburg County are provided emergency medical service by MEDIC, the Mecklenburg EMS Agency. All emergency ambulance service is provided by MEDIC. No other emergency transport companies are allowed to operate within Mecklenburg County. In the fiscal year 2024, MEDIC responded to 157,121 calls for service and transported 113,768 patients. While MEDIC is a division of Mecklenburg County Government, a board guides and directs MEDIC that consists of members affiliated with Atrium Health, Novant Health and a swing vote provided by the Mecklenburg County Board of Commissioners. Atrium and Novant are the two major medical institutions in Charlotte, North Carolina.

== Arts and culture ==
=== Museums and libraries ===
- Bechtler Museum of Modern Art
- Billy Graham Library
- Carolinas Aviation Museum
- Charlotte Museum of History
- Charlotte Nature Museum
- Discovery Place
- Discovery Place Kids-Huntersville
- Harvey B. Gantt Center for African-American Arts + Culture
- ImaginOn
- Levine Museum of the New South
- McColl Center for Visual Art
- Mint Museum Randolph
- Mint Museum Uptown
- NASCAR Hall of Fame
- Public Library of Charlotte and Mecklenburg County

=== Sports and entertainment ===
- Carolina Panthers
- Charlotte Hornets
- Charlotte Hounds
- Charlotte FC
- Charlotte Checkers
- Charlotte Knights
- Charlotte Independence
- Charlotte Motor Speedway
- Bank of America Stadium
- Truist Field
- Knights Stadium
- American Legion Memorial Stadium

=== Music and performing arts venues ===
* Actor's Theatre of Charlotte
- Bojangles' Coliseum
- Carolina Actors Studio Theatre
- ImaginOn
- Knight Theater
- Morrison YMCA Amphitheatre
- The Neighborhood Theatre in NoDa
- North Carolina Blumenthal Performing Arts Center
- Ovens Auditorium
- Skyla Credit Union Amphitheatre at the AvidxChange Music Factory
- Spectrum Center
- Spirit Square
- The Fillmore at the AvidxChange Music Factory
- The Milestone Club
- The Underground at the AvidxChange Music Factory
- Theatre Charlotte
- Truliant Amphitheater

=== Amusement parks ===
- Carowinds
- Great Wolf Lodge in Cabarrus County
- Ray's Splash Planet

=== Other attractions ===
- Carolina Place Mall
- Carolina Raptor Center
- Concord Mills Mall in Cabarrus County
- Lake Norman
- Lake Wylie
- Latta Plantation Nature Preserve
- Little Sugar Creek Greenway
- Mecklenburg County Aquatic Center
- Northlake Mall
- President James K. Polk Historic Site
- SouthPark Mall
- U.S. National Whitewater Center
- Charlotte Premium Outlets

== Communities ==
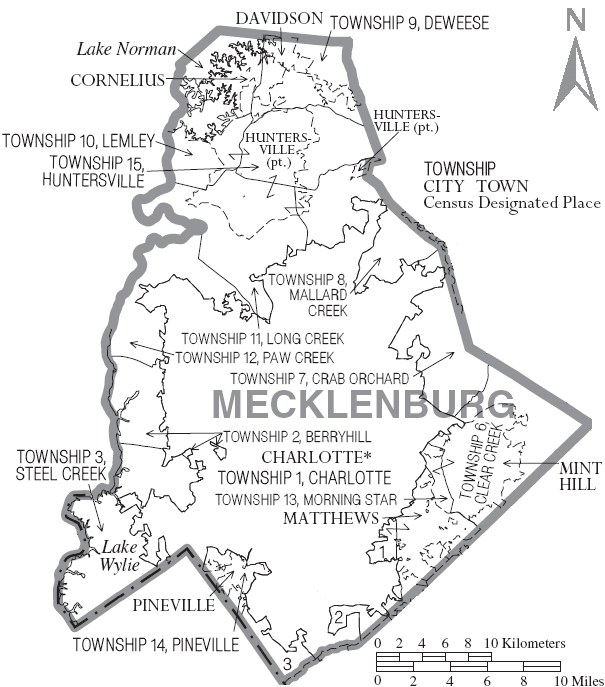
Map of Mecklenburg County with municipal and township labels

Mecklenburg County contains seven municipalities including the City of Charlotte and the towns of Cornelius, Davidson, and Huntersville (north of Charlotte); and the towns of Matthews, Mint Hill, and Pineville (south and southeast of Charlotte). A small portion of Stallings is also in Mecklenburg County, though most of that town is in Union County. Extraterritorial jurisdictions within the county are annexed by municipalities as soon as they reach sufficient concentrations.

=== City ===
- Charlotte (county seat and largest municipality in the county and state)

=== Towns ===
- Cornelius
- Davidson (most; small portion extends into Iredell)
- Huntersville
- Matthews
- Mint Hill (most; small portions extend into Union)
- Pineville
- Stallings (parts; mostly in Union)

=== Unincorporated communities ===
- Caldwell
- Dixie
- Hopewell
- Newell

=== Townships ===
By the requirements of the North Carolina Constitution of 1868, Mecklenburg County was divided into 15 townships. However, one township, Sharon, was later annexed to the Charlotte township and ceased to exist. The townships, which are both numbered and named, are as follows:

- Township 1, Charlotte
- Township 2, Berryhill
- Township 3, Steele Creek
- Township 4, Sharon (extinct)
- Township 5, Providence
- Township 6, Clear Creek
- Township 7, Crab Orchard
- Township 8, Mallard Creek
- Township 9, Deweese
- Township 10, Lemley
- Township 11, Long Creek
- Township 12, Paw Creek
- Township 13, Morning Star
- Township 14, Pineville
- Township 15, Huntersville

== Notable people ==
- Abraham Alexander (1717–1786), on the commission to establish town of Charlotte, North Carolina, North Carolina state legislator
- Evan Shelby Alexander (1767–1809), born in Mecklenburg County, later United States Congressman from North Carolina
- Nathaniel Alexander (1756–1808), born in Mecklenburg County, United States Congressman and governor of North Carolina
- Nellie Ashford (born c. 1943), folk artist born in Mecklenburg County
- Romare Bearden (1911–1988), 20th century African-American artist
- Sarah Frew Davidson (1804–1889), educator
- Brigadier General William Lee Davidson (1746–1781), was a North Carolina militia general during the American Revolutionary War.
- Ric Flair (born 1949), retired professional wrestler
- Anthony Foxx (born 1971), former United States Secretary of Transportation, former mayor of Charlotte.
- Judge Shirley Fulton (1952–2023), chief resident judge in the Superior Court of North Carolina
- Billy Graham (1918–2018), world-famous evangelist
- Eliza Ann Grier (1864–1902), born in Mecklenburg County, first African-American female physician in Georgia
- Anthony Hamilton (born 1971), American R&B/soul singer
- Daniel Harvey Hill (1821–1889), Confederate general during the American Civil War and a Southern scholar.
- Gen. Robert Irwin (1738–1800), a distinguished commander of Patriot (American Revolution) militia forces, who is said to have been a signer of the Mecklenburg Declaration of Independence
- Willie Kirkpatrick Lindsay (1875–1954), Dean of Women, Erskine College; President, North Carolina State Woman's Christian Temperance Union
- Pat McCrory (born 1956), former Governor of North Carolina, former seven-term Mayor of Charlotte.
- James K. Polk (1795–1849), 11th president of the United States. Polk was born in Mecklenburg County in 1795; his family moved to Tennessee when he was an adolescent.
- Colonel William Polk (1758–1834) banker, educational administrator, political leader, renowned Continental officer in the War for American Independence, and survivor of the 1777/1778 encampment at Valley Forge.
- Shannon Spake (born 1976), ESPN NASCAR correspondent

== See also ==
- List of counties in North Carolina
- National Register of Historic Places listings in Mecklenburg County, North Carolina
- List of United States cities by population
