= President James K. Polk Historic Site =

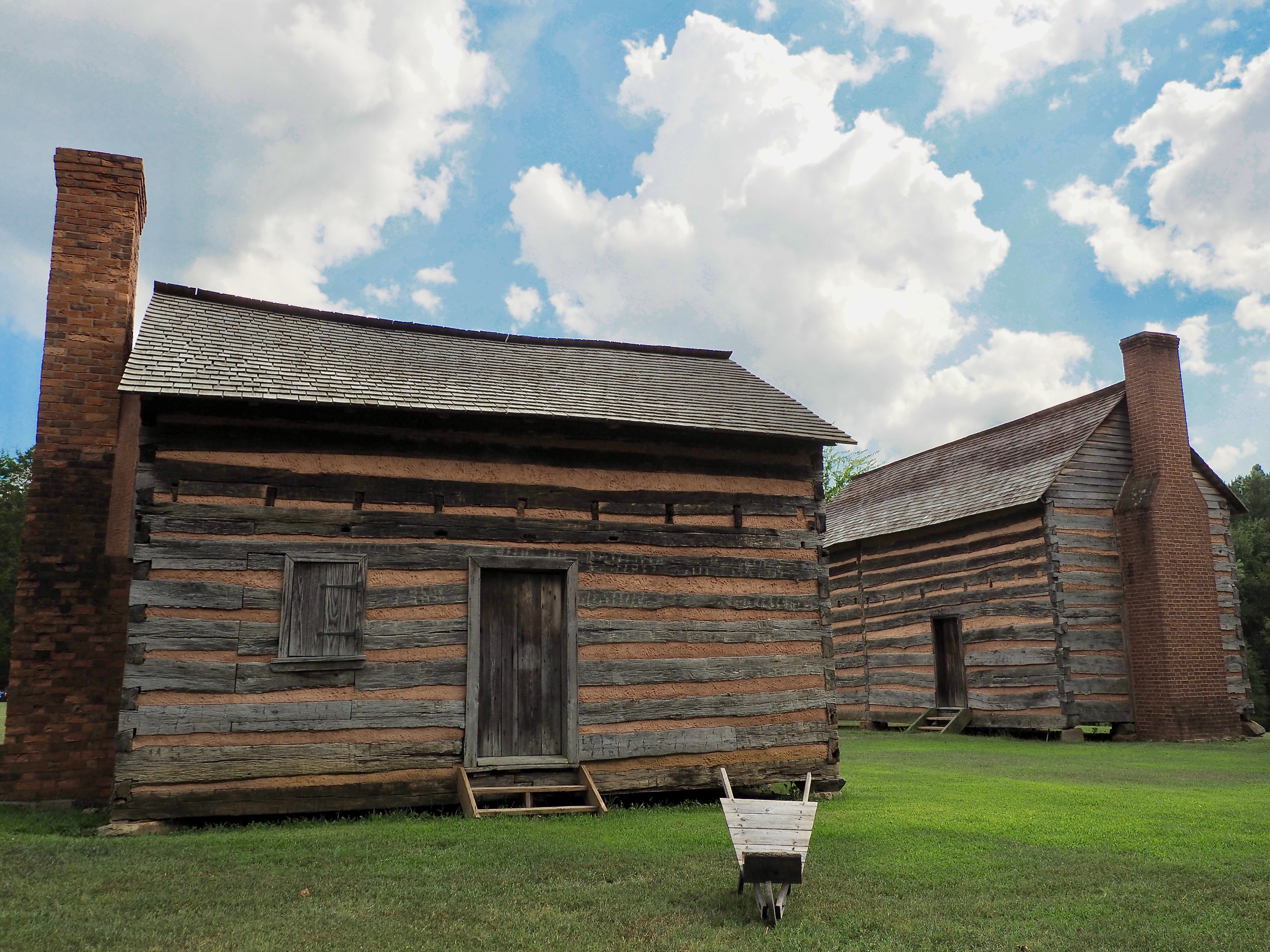
- Reconstructed log cabins at the site

- Location within North Carolina Location within the United States
- 35°4′40.4″N 80°52′54.2″W
- Location: Pineville, North Carolina

Site notes
- Governing body: North Carolina Historic Sites

The President James K. Polk Historic Site is a museum and historic location in Mecklenburg County, North Carolina, and a historic site managed by the North Carolina Department of Natural and Cultural Resources' Historic Sites division. The property was the location of property owned by the parents of President James K. Polk, and exhibits at the historic site serve to tell the story of the president's political career, as well as provide a look into life in North Carolina in the early 19th century.

== See also ==
- Presidential memorials in the United States
- List of residences of presidents of the United States
