= Robinson-Spangler Carolina Room =

The Robinson-Spangler Carolina Room is a department of the Main branch of the Charlotte Mecklenburg Library in Charlotte, North Carolina, United States. It houses historical materials on the history of Charlotte, of Mecklenburg County, and of North and South Carolina. It also contains a wealth of genealogical materials with all fifty states represented. Special collections include maps, photographs, manuscripts, family and business papers, and a music archive.

== Early history ==
The Carolina Room was first included as a separate part of public library service in Charlotte in 1956, when a new Main Library building opened. The previous Carnegie Free Library did not have an appropriate space to store rare documents and books. The Carolina Room made it possible to create an archive within the Main Library. It also offered a small research space: “three file cabinets, two sections of shelving with a table between them and an informal reading area . . . no microfilm room, just a couple of viewers,” recalled Carolina Room Manager Mary Louise Phillips in 1980.

== In 1989 Main Library Building ==
In 1989, the Main Library began operations in yet another building, about which the Charlotte Observer noted,

"When the uptown library doubled in space after a two-year renovation, the [Carolina] room was a big winner. It tripled in space, exchanging a cramped room for an airy, high-ceilinged suite in which arched doorways lead to rooms for rare books, newspaper files, music archives and a vault."

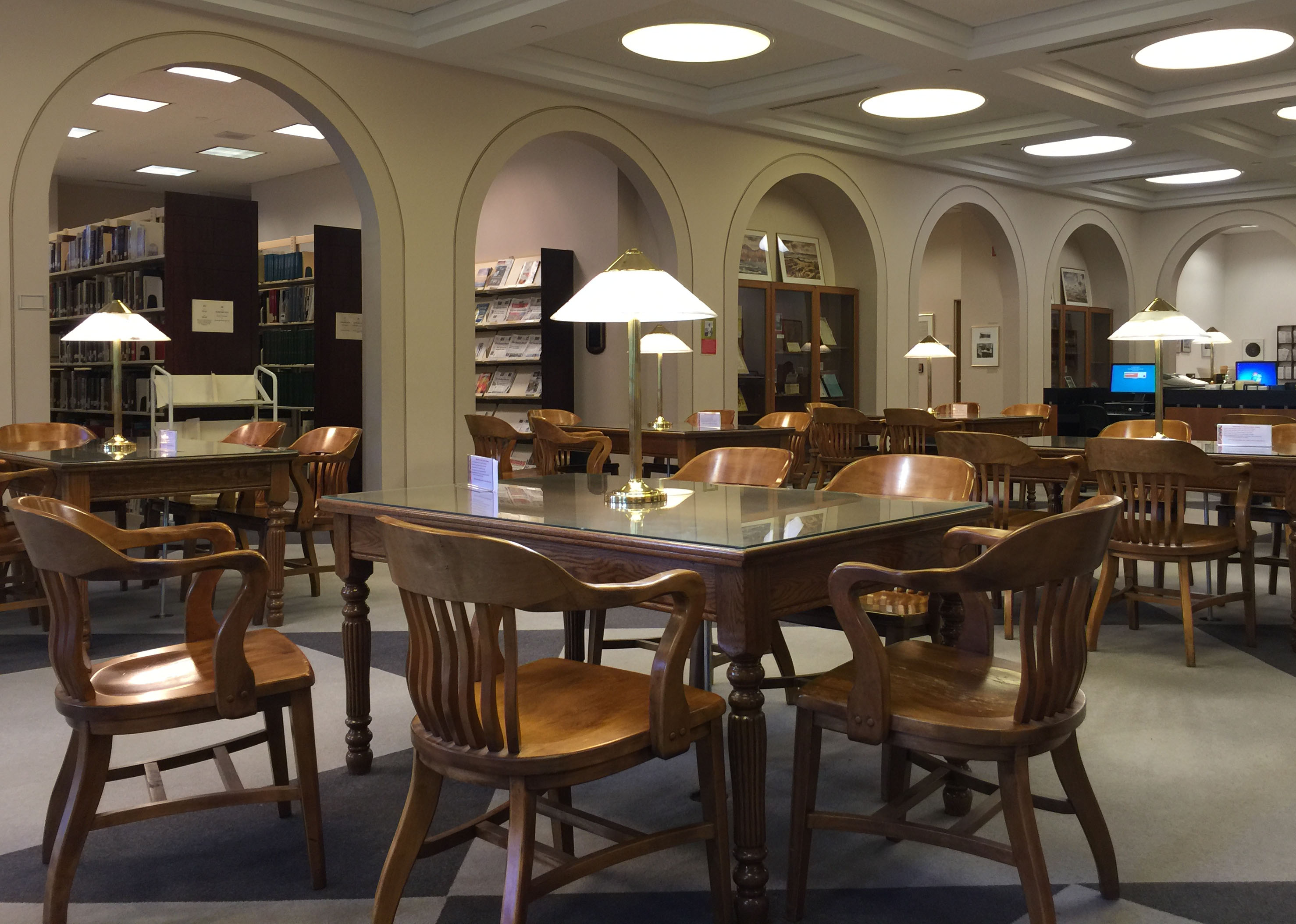
A view of the Robinson-Spangler Carolina Room in the Main Library of the Charlotte Mecklenburg Library system.

The name of the “Robinson-Spangler Carolina Room” dates from this period and acknowledges the leadership and generosity of two donors: Sally and Russell Robinson and Mr. and Mrs. C.D. Spangler, Jr.

The Carolina Room expanded its services in the 1990s by adding computers, offering classes on their use for genealogy, and by creating a music archive. In 1992 the Carolina Room solicited community participation for a special project to scan photographs of African American families. These images became the basis for a book: An African American Album: the Black Experience in Charlotte and Mecklenburg County.

== Growth and Present State ==
Since 1998, the Carolina Room has maintained its own website, “The Charlotte Mecklenburg Story,” to tell the story of the city and county’s history with materials from its collection. From the beginning the website has had a large and growing collection of historic images scanned from photographs and postcards. In the 2000s the Carolina Room created databases from records in its collection and made them available through its website. In this manner the names of soldiers who had trained here during World War I and records of local men who had died in World War II were shared with the public, and records of cemeteries as well as of early divorces in Mecklenburg County were made accessible to genealogists. The collection of cataloged items has grown to meet the demands of researchers, and donations of papers, photographs, and objects continue to be received and processed for addition to the archives.
