= 23 Things =

Learning project

23 Things, originally called Learning 2.0, is an education and learning project created by Helene Blowers in August 2006. Blowers, who was then employed as the technology director for the Charlotte Mecklenburg Library, created the project as a way to encourage librarians to learn and adapt to Web 2.0 and other new technologies. The program was loosely based on an article by Stephen Abram, "43 Things I (or You) might want to do this year".

== History ==
The original format of 23 Things required participants to take part in an eight-and-a-half-week course where they kept up with coursework via a series of weekly blog posts that described Web 2.0. During this time participants were given 23 assignments (23 things) and were encouraged to work with other learners. As the project was non-mandatory, participants took part in the coursework by posting their own blog entries for each week's coursework. The project was so successful that Blower held a 23 Things summit in 2009.

Since its inception, 23 Things has had over 500 iterations. The concept has broadened over time to include learning programs for other professionals and students, and has expanded to include more than 23 topics. 23 Things has grown beyond the United States, and is currently used in multiple countries, including Australia and New Zealand. Currently, "23 Things" is the name for this Web immersion experience for participants primarily supported by the participants themselves, where they are actively involved in a network of peers and colleagues, using digital communication tools, and using a blog to post reflections as they learn.

== Research ==
In 2012 San Jose State University assistant professor Michael Stephens performed a research study of 23 Things programs in Australia. He found that even if people did not successfully complete the program, that the program still had the potential to positively impact library staff as the participants would still be likely to use what they did learn and/or to return to the program at a later date. Stephens also noted that a strong majority of those who completed said they felt confident exploring and using new technologies: confidence and curiosity were identified as particularly notable outcomes.
