= ImaginOn =

Youth library and theatre in Charlotte, NC

ImaginOn: The Joe and Joan Martin Center
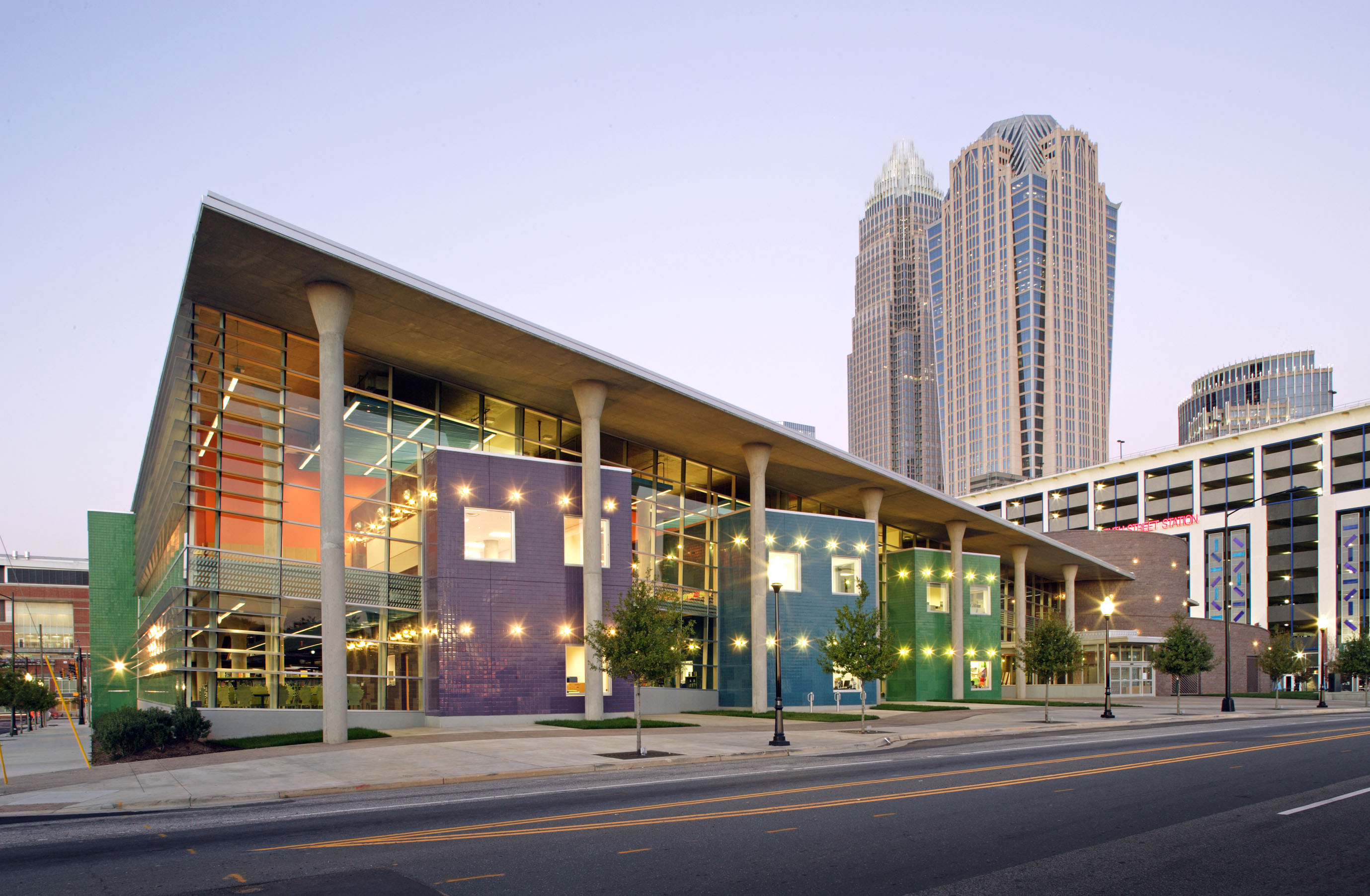
- Seventh Street Entrance
- 35°13′38.00″N 80°50′15.85″W
- Location: 300 East Seventh Street; Charlotte, North Carolina 28202; Mecklenburg County, United States
- Type: Partnership of the Charlotte Mecklenburg Library and Children's Theatre of Charlotte
- Established: 2005
- Branch of: Charlotte Mecklenburg Library

Other information
- Director: Angie Meyers (Interim Director) (Library); Adam Burke & Nao Tsurumaki (Theater)
- Website: ImaginOn

ImaginOn: The Joe and Joan Martin Center is a collaborative venture of Charlotte Mecklenburg Library and the Children's Theatre of Charlotte located in Charlotte, North Carolina. This 102,000-square-foot (9,500 m^{2}) landmark learning center opened on October 8, 2005. ImaginOn was designed by Gantt Huberman Architects and Holzman Moss Bottino Architecture, and is owned by the Charlotte Mecklenburg Library.

ImaginOn hosts the Spangler Children's Library; the Teen Loft, a library for the teens of Mecklenburg County; Time Warner Tech Central; the Story Lab, a collection of interactive multimedia workstations exploring the arts of narrative; Studio I, an audio/video recording and animation studio; the Hugh McColl Family Theatre (seating capacity 570); and the Wells Fargo Playhouse (seating capacity 250), as well as administrative offices for the Children's Theatre of Charlotte and library staff.

ImaginOn is notable as the first LEED-certified public facility in Mecklenburg County. ImaginOn is certified as a 'green' building at the silver level by the U.S. Green Building Council.

== Tech Central, the Loft, and Studio I ==
The Loft is a 4,000-square-foot (370 m^{2}) space on the third floor of ImaginOn dedicated to teens. Also on the third floor is Studio I, an animation and sound studio that teens can use to produce stop-motion and computer-generated animations as well as accompanying sound tracks. The national winners of the 2007 and the 2008 Young Adult Public Service Announcement contests sponsored by the Collaborative Summer Reading Program were produced by teens using Studio I. The Loft also contains collaborative spaces for teens to work together on projects and a library with the latest in DVDs, books, graphic novels, and CDs of interest to teens.

Tech Central is a computer lab for teens with over thirty computers and a wide variety of activities for visitors under 19 years, and adults accompanied by a child.

== Spangler Children's Library ==
The Spangler Children's Library is located on the first floor of ImaginOn and contains a large collection of books and materials appealing to children from birth through fifth grade. The Spangler Library also hosts collections of special interest to teachers, parents, and caregivers.

== McColl Family Theatre ==
The McColl Family Theatre is a proscenium theater with trapped stage and single purchase fly system. There are 420 seats in the orchestra and an additional 150 seats on the balcony level. Children's Theatre of Charlotte uses the McColl Family Theatre (as well as the Wells Fargo Playhouse) to stage a full season of professional theatre for families. "The Lion, the Witch and the Wardrobe" opened the 2005 season.

== Wells Fargo Playhouse ==
The Wells Fargo Playhouse is designed as a theater with a modified thrust configuration and a reconfigurable proscenium. Its 250 seats are regularly filled for performances by Children's Theatre of Charlotte, as well as film series and other programs sponsored by either the Library or the Children's Theatre of Charlotte.
