= AvidxChange Music Factory =

Entertainment complex in Charlotte, North Carolina

Coordinates: 35°14′23″N 80°50′44″W

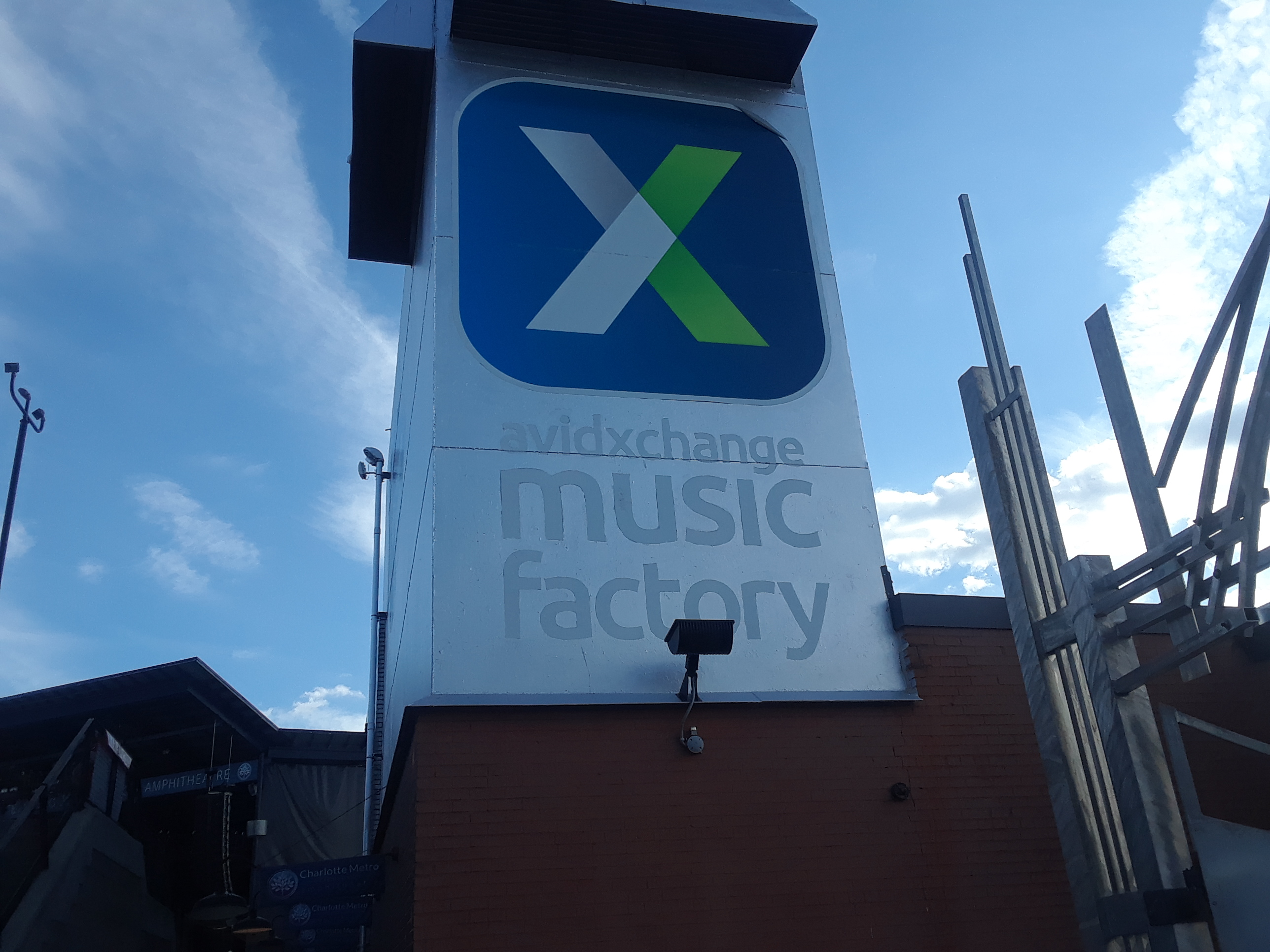
Logo at Music Factory entrance

The AvidXchange Music Factory is an entertainment complex located in downtown Charlotte, North Carolina. It consists of two concert venues and a number of restaurants and bars on the former site of a mill in the northern end of the downtown area.

== History ==
The complex first opened in 2006 as the NC Music Factory. Developer ARK Group wanted to build a Charlotte version of New York City's SoHo, and intended it as the first stage of an entertainment, office and residential district.

In 2016, payment software firm AvidXchange took over the naming rights for the complex. On March 1, 2016; it officially changed its name to the AvidXchange Music Factory. Terms for the naming rights were not disclosed.

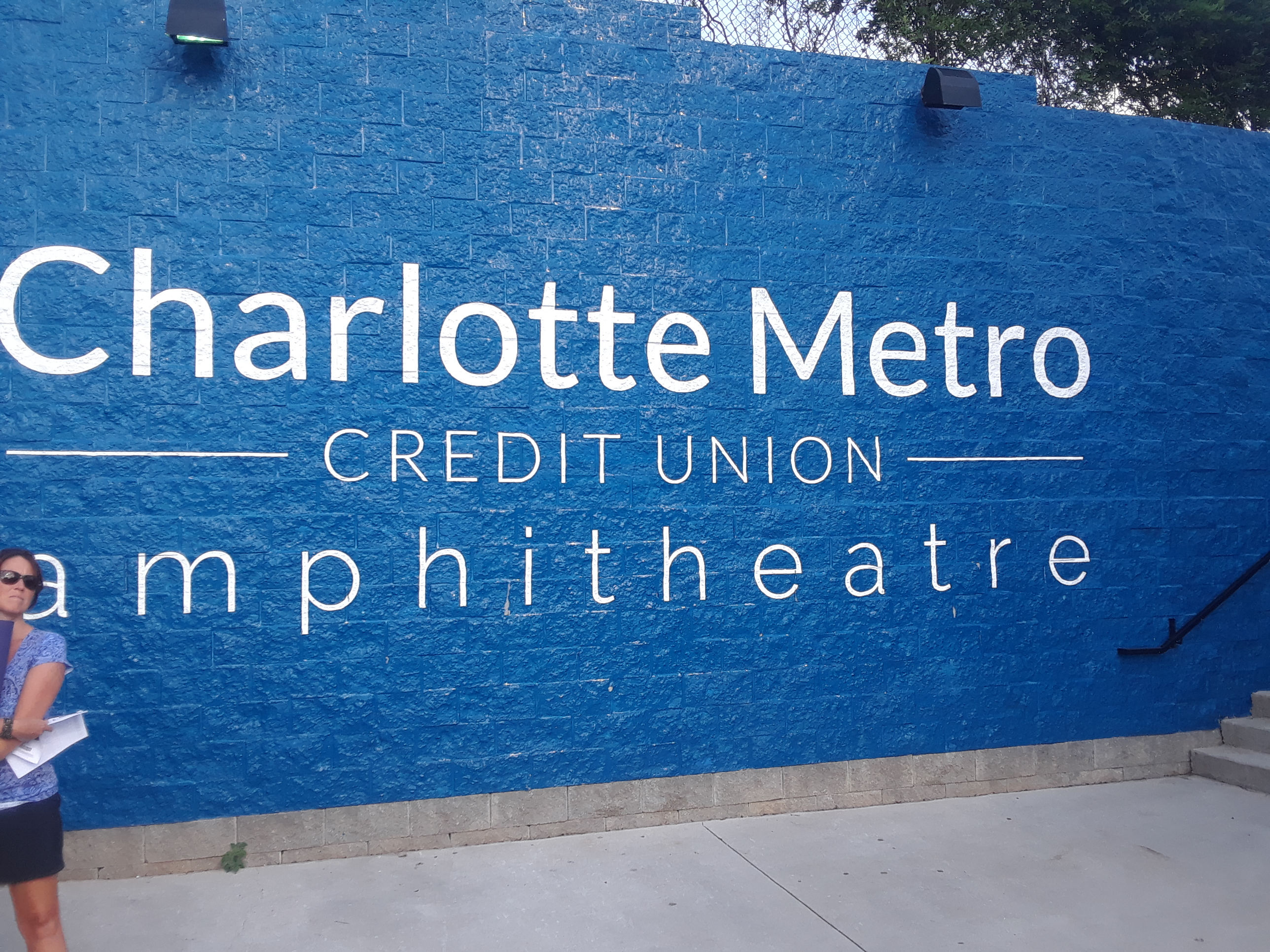
Amphitheatre entrance from when it was known as Charlotte Metro Credit Union Amphitheatre

== Venues ==
The centerpieces of the complex are the Skyla Credit Union Amphitheatre and The Fillmore Charlotte, two entertainment venues managed by Live Nation.

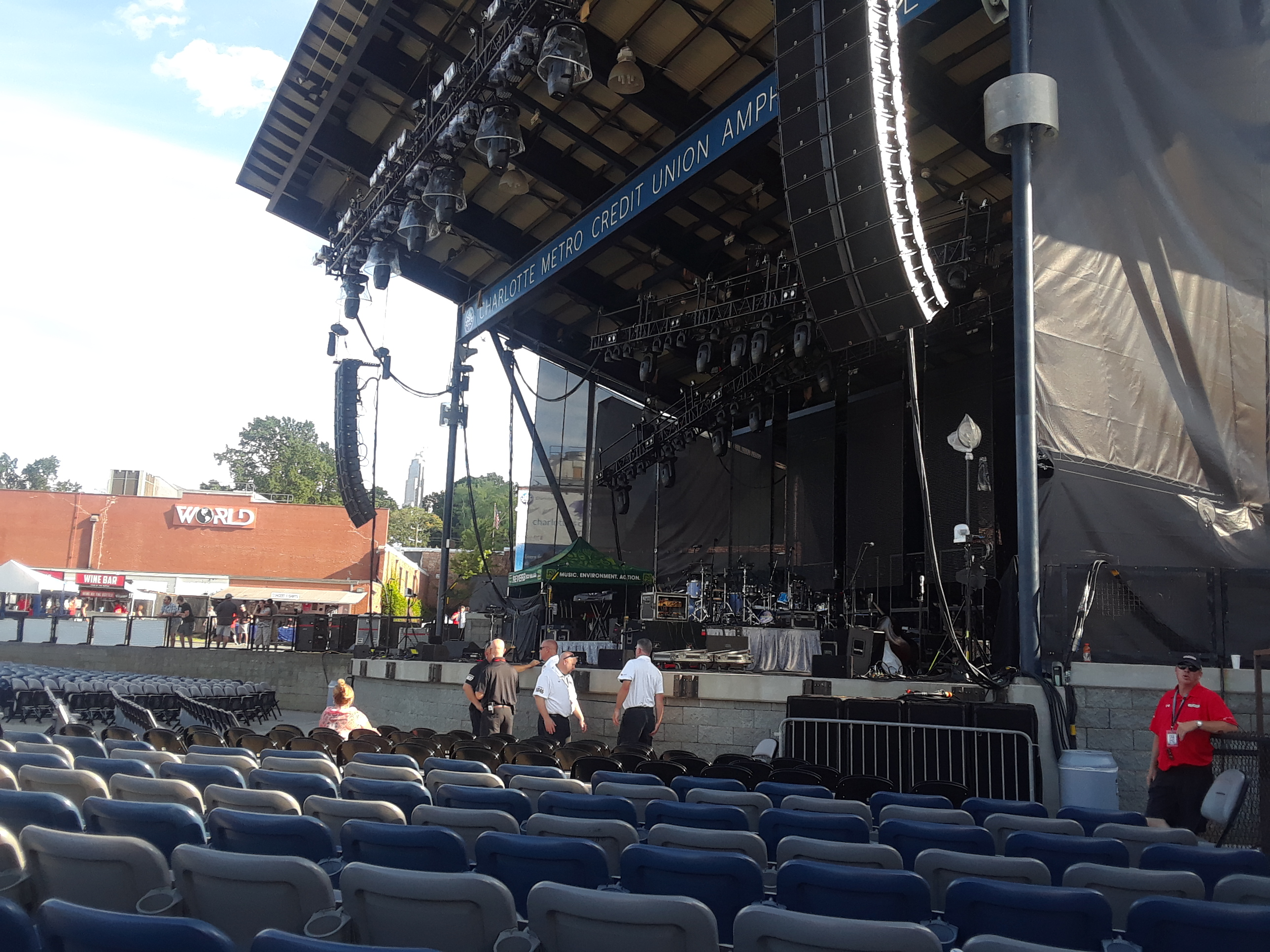
Amphitheatre stage

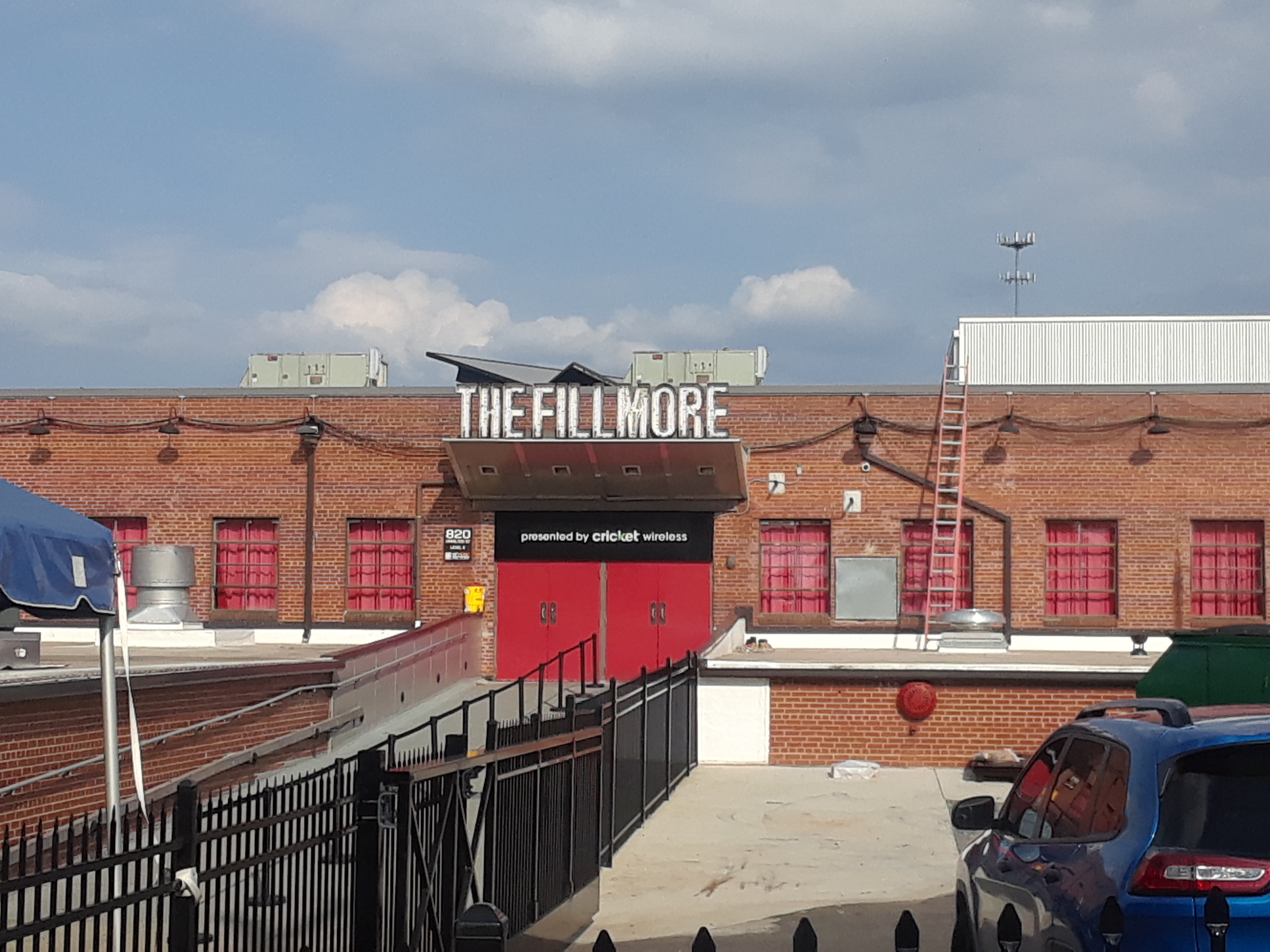
The Fillmore

=== Skyla Credit Union Amphitheatre ===
The Skyla Credit Union Amphitheatre, formerly the Charlotte Metro Credit Union Amphitheatre, seats 5,000 people, including 2,000 reserved seats and a festival lawn that can accommodate up to 3,000 people. It opened in June 2009. When it opened, it took most of the major acts that had previously played at the Palladium at Carowinds.

Originally known as simply the "Uptown Amphitheatre," it has also been known as the Road Runner Mobile Amphitheatre.

=== The Fillmore Charlotte ===
The Fillmore Charlotte opened in June 2009, shortly after the amphitheatre opened next door.

As part of the 2019 NBA All-Star Weekend, TNT aired a live broadcast of Inside the NBA at the Fillmore Charlotte on Thursday, February 14, 2019, and Friday February 15, 2019. It was hosted by Ernie Johnson Jr., Charles Barkley, Kenny Smith and Shaquille O'Neal, with special performances by Chris Tucker (Thursday) and Rae Sremmurd (Friday).

=== The Underground ===
The Underground is a 750 capacity venue that opened in July 2016, in a space formerly occupied by a country bar.
