= Pineville, North Carolina =

- Town
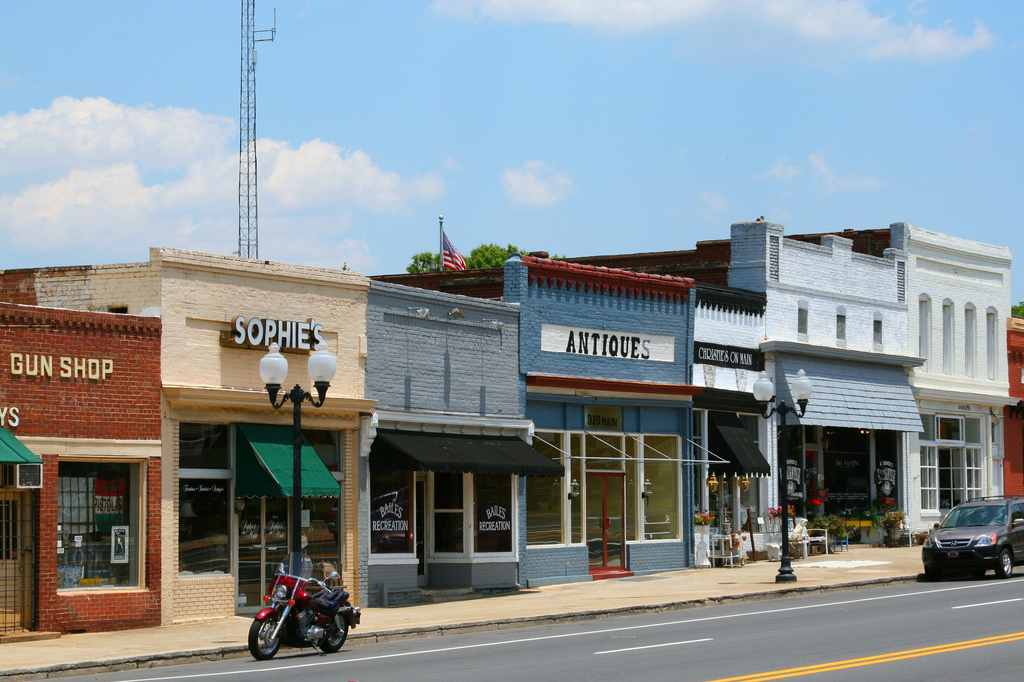
- Main Street in the Historic Pineville Town Center

- Location in Mecklenburg County and the state of North Carolina

- Location within North Carolina Location within the United States
- Coordinates: 35°05′11″N 80°53′29″W
- Country: United States
- State: North Carolina
- County: Mecklenburg
- Incorporated: 1873
- Named for: The large and abundant pines that cast their shadows over the community

Area
  - Total: 6.68 sq mi (17.29 km^{2})
  - Land: 6.64 sq mi (17.20 km^{2})
  - Water: 0.035 sq mi (0.09 km^{2})
- Elevation: 554 ft (169 m)

Population (2020)
  - Total: 10,602
  - Density: 1,596/sq mi (616.4/km^{2})
- Time zone: UTC-5 (Eastern (EST))
  - Summer (DST): UTC-4 (EDT)
- ZIP Codes: 28134 (Pineville); 28210, 28226 (Charlotte)
- Area code: 704
- FIPS code: 37-52220
- GNIS feature ID: 2407125
- Website: www.pinevillenc.gov

Pineville (/ˈpaɪnvɪl/; locally /ˈpaɪnvəl/) is a suburban town in the southernmost portion of Mecklenburg County, North Carolina, United States. Part of the Charlotte metropolitan area, it is situated in the Waxhaws region between Charlotte and Fort Mill. As of the 2020 census, Pineville had a population of 10,602, up from 7,479 in 2010.

== History ==
Prior to its incorporation in 1873, Pineville, originally named Morrow's Turnout, was located at the intersection of two major Native American trading routes; it had vast meadows in which the animals of trade and transportation could be "turned-out" to pasture. The location served as a mule trading center in addition to a stop for stagecoaches and, later, the Charlotte & Columbia Railroad.

Around 1852, Morrow's Turnout was renamed Pineville, after the large stands of pine trees in the area.

The growth of Pineville was greatly changed through the initial segment of I-485 opening to traffic. Although the one-mile (1.6 km) stretch connecting interchanges at NC Highway 51 and South Boulevard was designed to divert through traffic around Charlotte via a freeway loop, I-485 incidentally passed through Pineville's town limits. In the years to follow, largely undeveloped land adjacent to Pineville's two I-485 interchanges developed into what is now the largest shopping district in North Carolina. The town population has grown from less than 2,000 between the 1930s and 1980s to over 10,000 in 2020.

== Geography ==
Pineville is located in southern Mecklenburg County, bordered to the north, east, and northwest by the city of Charlotte, and to the southwest by the state of South Carolina. It is 11 miles (18 km) south of Uptown Charlotte, the city center, and 8 miles (13 km) north of the center of Fort Mill, South Carolina.

According to the U.S. Census Bureau, the town of Pineville has a total area of 6.68 square miles (17.3 km^{2}), of which 0.04 square miles (0.10 km^{2}), or 0.54%, are water. The town is drained by Sugar Creek and Little Sugar Creek, which pass respectively west and east of the town center, flowing south toward the Catawba River.

=== Parks and green space ===
Pineville Lake Park includes a dog park, three picnic shelters, playgrounds, a splash pad, a stage, and various trails. The park connects to the Little Sugar Creek Greenway.

== Demographics ==
Historical population
| Census | Pop. | Note | %± |
|---|---|---|---|
| 1900 | 585 | | — |
| 1910 | 688 | | 17.6% |
| 1920 | 650 | | −5.5% |
| 1930 | 1,108 | | 70.5% |
| 1940 | 1,144 | | 3.2% |
| 1950 | 1,373 | | 20.0% |
| 1960 | 1,514 | | 10.3% |
| 1970 | 1,948 | | 28.7% |
| 1980 | 1,525 | | −21.7% |
| 1990 | 2,970 | | 94.8% |
| 2000 | 3,449 | | 16.1% |
| 2010 | 7,479 | | 116.8% |
| 2020 | 10,602 | | 41.8% |
| 2025 (est.) | 11,851 | ▲ | 11.8% |
U.S. Decennial Census

=== 2020 census ===
As of the 2020 census, Pineville had a population of 10,602. The median age was 35.8 years. 20.6% of residents were under the age of 18 and 15.5% were 65 years of age or older. For every 100 females, there were 83.9 males, and for every 100 females age 18 and over, there were 78.2 males age 18 and over.

100.0% of residents lived in urban areas, while 0.0% lived in rural areas.

There were 4,826 households in Pineville, of which 28.6% had children under the age of 18 living in them. Of all households, 32.9% were married-couple households, 19.5% were households with a male householder and no spouse or partner present, and 38.9% were households with a female householder and no spouse or partner present. About 37.7% of all households were made up of individuals and 15.2% had someone living alone who was 65 years of age or older.

There were 5,201 housing units, of which 7.2% were vacant. The homeowner vacancy rate was 0.9% and the rental vacancy rate was 9.5%.

Pineville racial composition
| Race | Number | Percentage |
|---|---|---|
| White (non-Hispanic) | 4,855 | 45.79% |
| Black or African American (non-Hispanic) | 2,425 | 22.87% |
| Native American | 31 | 0.29% |
| Asian | 596 | 5.62% |
| Pacific Islander | 9 | 0.08% |
| Other/Mixed | 438 | 4.13% |
| Hispanic or Latino | 2,248 | 21.2% |

=== 2010 census ===
As of the 2010 census, the town's population was 7,479.

=== 2000 census ===
As of the census of 2000, there were 3,449 people, 1,632 households, and 744 families residing in the town. The population density was 965.8 inhabitants per square mile (372.9/km^{2}). There were 1,760 housing units at an average density of 492.8 units per square mile (190.3 units/km^{2}). The racial makeup of the town was 80.05% White, 10.00% African American, 0.20% Native American, 3.31% Asian, 0.06% Pacific Islander, 4.00% from other races, and 2.38% from two or more races. Hispanic or Latino of any race were 11.16% of the population.

There were 1,632 households, out of which 19.9% had children under the age of 18 living with them, 31.1% were married couples living together, 10.0% had a female householder with no husband present, and 54.4% were non-families. 42.3% of all households were made up of individuals, and 7.4% had someone living alone who was 65 years of age or older. The average household size was 2.04 and the average family size was 2.80.

The age range of Pineville's population is 17.5% under the age of 18, 13.0% from 18 to 24, 42.2% from 25 to 44, 16.1% from 45 to 64, and 11.2% 65 years of age or older. The median age was 32 years. For every 100 females, there were 98.4 males. For every 100 females age 18 and over, there were 97.6 males.

The median income for a household in the town was $38,261, and the median income for a family was $45,500. Males had a median income of $30,833 versus $29,508 for females. The per capita income for the town was $21,958. About 3.6% of families and 6.6% of the population were below the poverty line, including 11.7% of those under age 18 and 7.2% of those age 65 or over.

== Economy ==
In the 1890s, Dover Yarn Mills established a cotton mill in Pineville. This mill later became Cone Mills, Inc., which operated in the town until November 1991.

=== Businesses ===
Carolina Place Mall, opened in 1991, is a 1.1 million square foot shopping mall located at North Carolina Highway 51 and Interstate 485.

=== Employment ===
According to the 2024 census Pineville has a labor force of 5,750 employees. Its most common job groups are management occupations and office administrative occupations.

== Arts and culture ==
=== Museums ===
The President James K. Polk Historic Site is located on part of the 150 acres originally owned by the father of the 11th president of the United States, James K. Polk. While Polk's home no longer stands, an original cabin from the time period is located on the site in addition to two reconstructed log cabins, a main house, a cookhouse, and a log barn. The site additionally hosts guided tours and a museum with a short film on the life and times of James K. Polk along with period clothes and other artifacts of the area and era.

== Infrastructure ==
=== City services ===
==== Hospitals ====
Pineville is served by Atrium Health Pineville, a 206-bed acute care facility opened in 1987 as Mercy Hospital South.

==== Public safety ====
Pineville is served by the Pineville Police Department and the Pineville Fire Department.

== Education ==
=== Primary and secondary schools ===
==== Public schools ====
Pineville is included in the jurisdiction of Charlotte-Mecklenburg Schools, who operates the two schools directly located in the town: Pineville Elementary School and Sterling Elementary School.

For elementary school students, most areas are zoned to Pineville Elementary School, though some residential areas are instead zoned to Smithfield Elementary School. For middle and high school students, all residents are zoned to Quail Hollow Middle School and South Mecklenburg High School or, starting in the 2024–2025 school year for the majority of the town, Ballantyne Ridge High School.

==== Private and religion-based schools ====
- GraceLife Academy
- Precious Child Academy
- South Charlotte Baptist Academy

== Notable people ==
- Julianna Cannamela, artistic gymnast
- D. J. Carton, professional basketball player
- Lauren Cholewinski, Olympic speed skater
- Julius Daniels, Piedmont blues musician
- Walter Davis, NBA player who was a six-time All-Star and gold medalist at 1976 Summer Olympics
- Lew Massey, professional basketball player
- James K. Polk, 11th president of the United States, serving from 1845 to 1849
- Erwin Potts, first non-McClatchy family member CEO of the McClatchy Company
- Charles T. Robertson Jr., retired United States Air Force general
- Mary Tucker, sport shooter, silver medalist at 2020 Summer Olympics
