= Drake Maye =

American football player (born 2002)

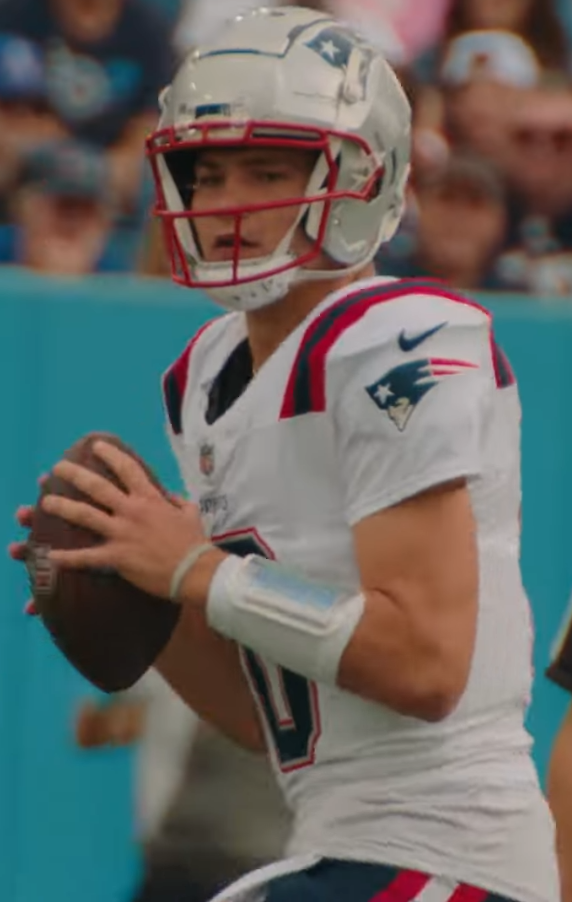
- Maye with the New England Patriots in 2024

No. 10 – New England Patriots
- Position: Quarterback
- Roster status: Active

Personal information
- Born: August 30, 2002 (age 24); Huntersville, North Carolina, U.S.
- Listed height: 6 ft 4 in (1.93 m)
- Listed weight: 225 lb (102 kg)

Career information
- High school: Myers Park (Charlotte, North Carolina)
- College: North Carolina (2021–2023)
- NFL draft: 2024: 1st round, 3rd overall pick

Career history
- New England Patriots (2024–present)

Awards and highlights
- Second-team All-Pro (2025); 2× Pro Bowl (2024, 2025); NFL passer rating leader (2025); NFL completion percentage leader (2025); Bert Bell Award (2025); Shaun Alexander Award (2022); ACC Player of the Year (2022); ACC Rookie of the Year (2022); First-team All-ACC (2022); Second-team All-ACC (2023)

Career NFL statistics as of Week 10, 2026
- Passing attempts: 1,106
- Passing completions: 760
- Completion percentage: 68.7%
- TD–INT: 64–29
- Passing yards: 9,000
- Passer rating: 101.6
- Rushing yards: 1,101
- Rushing touchdowns: 9
- Stats at Pro Football Reference

Drake Lee Maye (born August 30, 2002) is an American professional football quarterback for the New England Patriots of the National Football League (NFL). He played college football for the North Carolina Tar Heels, winning the Shaun Alexander Award and ACC Football Player of the Year in 2022 after leading the NCAA in total yards.

Selected third overall by New England in the 2024 NFL draft, Maye earned Pro Bowl honors during his rookie season. The following year, he led the Patriots to their first division title since 2019 en route to an appearance in Super Bowl LX, while receiving a second consecutive Pro Bowl selection and second-team All-Pro honors.

== Early life ==
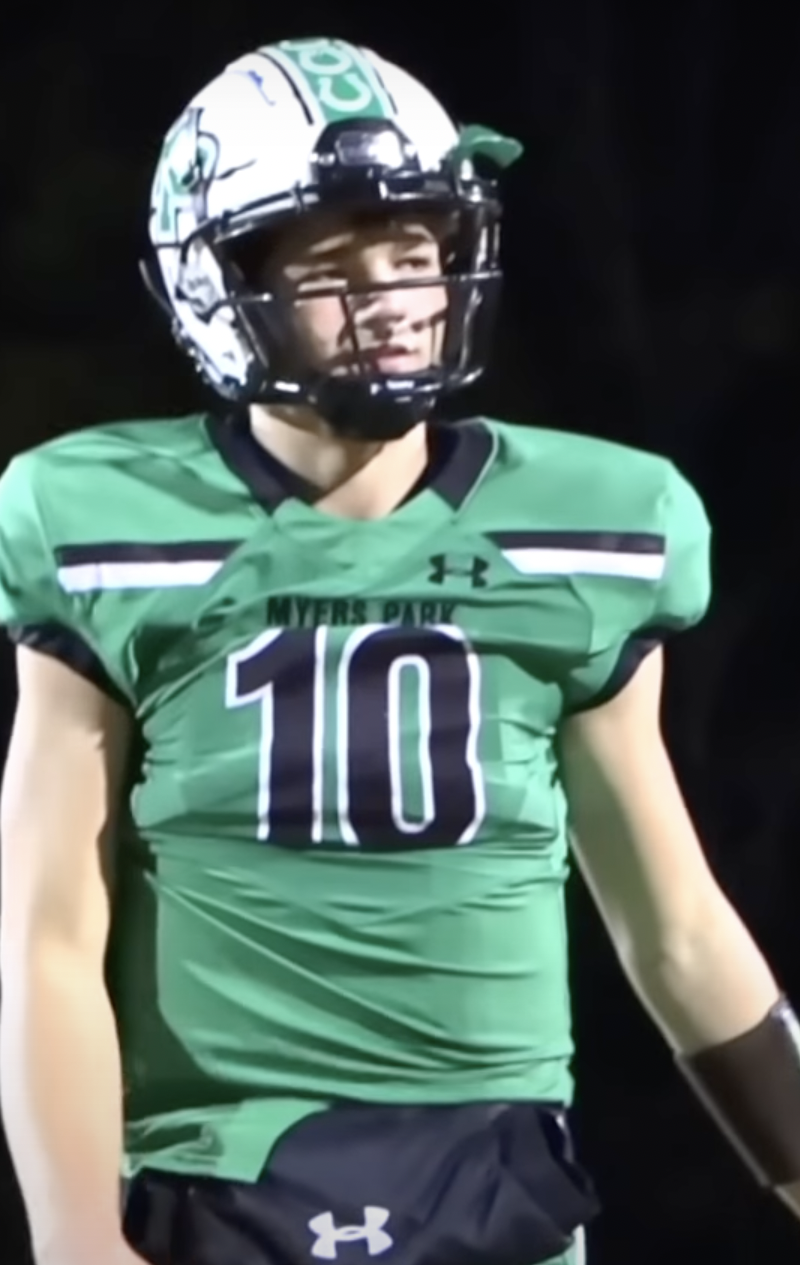
Maye at Myers Park High School, December 2018

Maye was born on August 30, 2002, in Huntersville, North Carolina. He attended William A. Hough High School in Cornelius, North Carolina, and transferred after his freshman year to Myers Park High School in Charlotte, where he played football and basketball. He has three brothers, who also played football. Two of his brothers, Luke and Cole, won national championships playing collegiate sports.

Drake Maye and his brothers were competitive with each other. As a junior in high school, he received All-Conference and All-District honors in basketball and was named The Charlotte Observer's 2019 male athlete of the year after throwing for a school-record 3,512 yards and 50 touchdowns en route to a conference championship appearance. Maye was named a Under Armour All-American in 2020 despite being unable to play his senior season due to the COVID-19 pandemic. Rated a four-star prospect, Maye committed to play college football for the Alabama Crimson Tide in July 2019 before flipping to North Carolina in Chapel Hill in March 2020.

Maye grew up a fan of the Carolina Panthers and attended Super Bowl 50 at Levi's Stadium.

== College career ==
As a redshirt in his freshman season for the North Carolina Tar Heels, Maye appeared in four games behind starter Sam Howell in 2021. With Howell leaving for the NFL in 2022, Maye was named the starter prior to the season. In the opening game against Florida A&M, he threw five touchdowns and became the first UNC quarterback to do so in his debut. Maye had four or more touchdowns in games against Appalachian State, Notre Dame, Virginia Tech, Pittsburgh, and Wake Forest. He led the team to appearances in the 2022 ACC Championship Game and Holiday Bowl and was named the ACC Player of the Year after leading the NCAA in total offense with 5,019, passing for school-records 4,321 yards and 38 touchdowns while rushing for 698 yards and 7 touchdowns.

In the 2023 season, Maye threw for over 400 yards against Syracuse, Miami, and Campbell University. He was named second-team All-ACC after passing for 3,608 yards and 24 touchdowns while rushing for 449 yards and nine touchdowns. He declared for the 2024 NFL draft following the season. He finished his career fifth in passing yards (8,018) and fourth in passing touchdowns (63) in UNC history.

== Professional career ==
Pre-draft measurables
Height	Weight	Arm length	Hand span	Wingspan
6 ft 4 3/8 in (1.94 m)	223 lb (101 kg)	32 1/4 in (0.82 m)	9 1/8 in (0.23 m)	6 ft 4 1/8 in (1.93 m)
All values from NFL Combine

=== 2024 ===
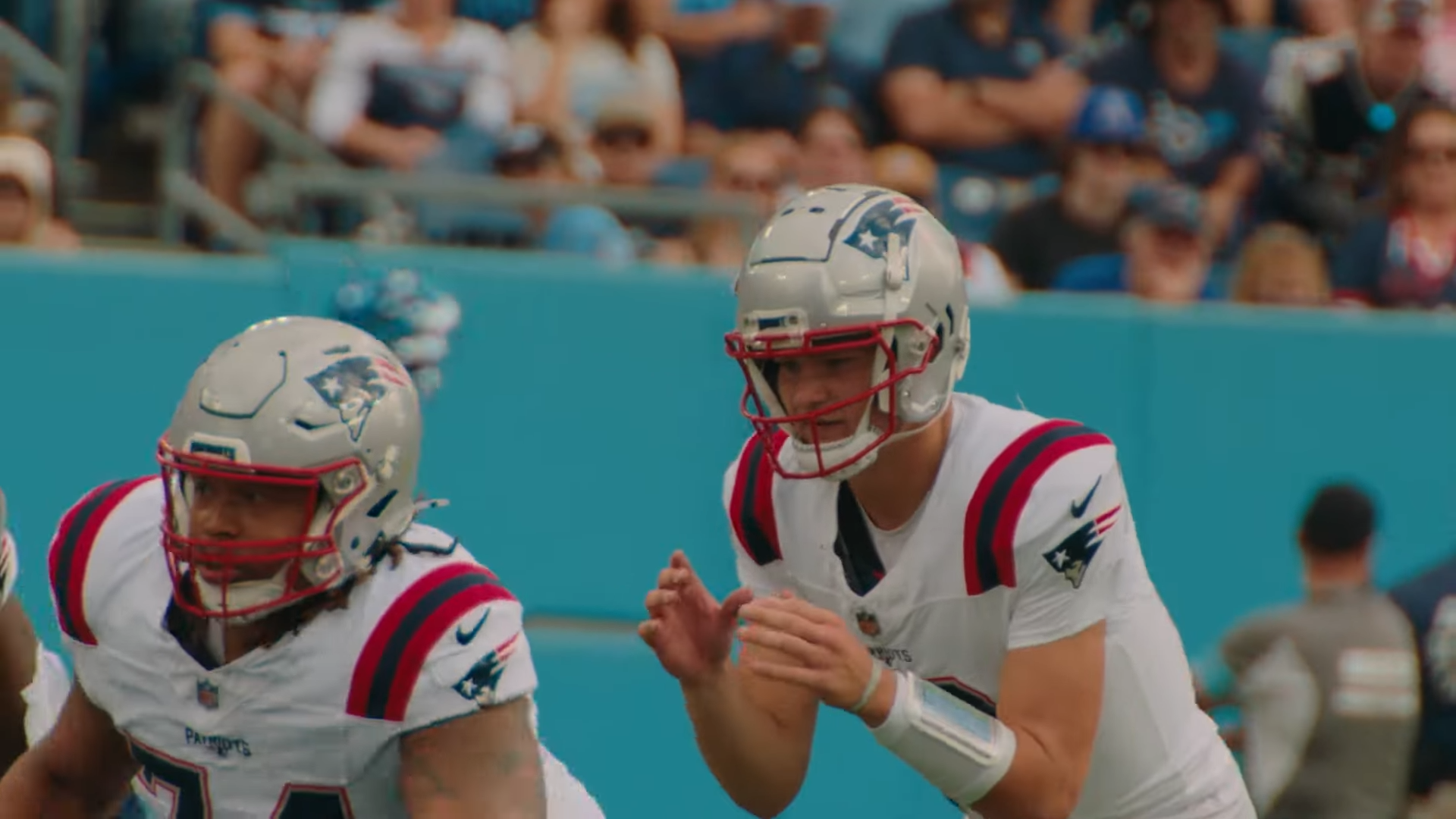
Maye with the New England Patriots during his rookie season in 2024

The New England Patriots selected Maye with the third overall pick in the 2024 NFL draft. He was the first Patriot since Drew Bledsoe in 1993 selected in the top five picks of the draft, and the third of a record-tying six quarterbacks taken in the first round (tied with the 1983 draft). The Patriots reportedly declined offers for their pick from the Minnesota Vikings and New York Giants that would have included additional first-round draft picks.

Maye signed a four-year, fully-guaranteed contract worth $36.64 million on May 28, 2024. He was the second consecutive Patriots first-round rookie quarterback to choose the number 10, following Mac Jones. Despite a strong preseason, Maye was named a backup to veteran Jacoby Brissett to begin his rookie season. Maye made his regular season debut in Week 3, entering in the fourth quarter of the Patriots' 24–3 road loss to the New York Jets. Maye finished the game, completing four of eight passes for 22 yards and rushing for 12 yards. On October 8, 2024, after the Patriots fell to 1–4 and continued struggles from Brissett, Maye was named the starting quarterback. In his first start against the Houston Texans, Maye completed 20 of 33 passes for 243 yards with 3 touchdowns and 2 interceptions in the 41–21 loss; he also led the team with 38 rushing yards. Maye's three touchdowns were one more than Brissett had thrown in his five 2024 starts, and Maye became the first quarterback since at least 1950 to throw three touchdown passes and lead his team in rushing in his first start. In Week 8 against the Jets, Maye recorded a rushing touchdown before exiting the game in the second quarter with a head injury, later diagnosed as a concussion. The Patriots would go on to win 25–22. The Patriots finished the season with a 4–13 record and did not make the playoffs.

Maye finished his rookie season throwing for 2,276 yards with 15 touchdowns and 10 interceptions. Maye's first 10 passing touchdowns went to ten different receivers, making him the first NFL quarterback to accomplish that feat since Steve Ramsey did so in 1973. In January 2025, Maye was selected to play in the 2025 Pro Bowl Games as a replacement for Buffalo Bills quarterback Josh Allen.

=== 2025 ===
The 2025 season began with changes in the Patriots' coaching staff with the hiring of new head coach Mike Vrabel and the return of offensive coordinator Josh McDaniels. Vrabel cited the presence of Maye as being one of his reasons for taking the position. During the 2025 season, Maye was given the nickname of "Drake Maye", as Patriots teammates started referring to him as Drake "Drake Maye" Maye. The moniker came from a social media humor fanpage dedicated to Maye, and it became a popular meme.

In Week 5 against the Buffalo Bills, Maye completed 22 of 30 passes for 273 yards, including leading a 37-yard game-winning drive to allow Andrés Borregales to convert a 52-yard field goal with 15 seconds left to win the game 23–20. In Week 7 against the Tennessee Titans, Maye set a franchise record in completion percentage in a regular-season game, completing 21 of 23 passes, a 91.3% completion percentage, overtaking Tom Brady’s 88.5%, while also throwing for 222 yards and two touchdowns in the 31–13 victory. In Week 13 against the New York Giants, Maye completed 24 of 31 passes for 282 yards and two touchdowns in the 33–15 victory, and was named AFC Offensive Player of the Week. Maye led the Patriots to their first playoff berth since 2021 in a 28–24 Week 16 victory against the Baltimore Ravens, completing 31 of 44 passes for 380 yards with two touchdowns and one interception, including leading an 89-yard drive late in the fourth quarter that ended in a Rhamondre Stevenson rushing touchdown to take the lead. This was the first 300-yard game of Maye's career.

In the 42–10 win in Week 17 against the New York Jets, Maye completed 19 of 21 passes (90.4%) for 256 yards and a career-high five touchdowns, becoming the first NFL quarterback to complete over 90% of his passes while throwing 250 yards and five touchdowns in a game. In this game, Maye had 1.28 EPA (expected points added) per dropback, the highest value on that measure since 2000, as well as a 99.8 QBR, the highest value in that stat's history. Maye finished the 2025 season throwing 4,394 yards with 31 touchdowns and eight interceptions. He was named to the NFL All-Pro second team. He was also selected for the 2026 Pro Bowl Games for the second time, and for the first time on the initial ballot. He finished second in the voting for Most Valuable Player to Matthew Stafford, finishing with 361 points to Stafford's 366; Maye received 23 first-place votes to Stafford's 24. He was ranked 11th by his fellow players on the NFL Top 100 Players of 2026.

In the Wild Card Round against the Los Angeles Chargers, Maye made his playoff debut, completing 17 of 29 passes for 268 yards with one touchdown and one interception, while also leading the team in rushing with 66 yards in the 16–3 victory. In the Divisional Round against the Houston Texans, Maye completed 16 of 27 passes for 179 yards with three touchdowns and one interception as the Patriots beat the Texans 28–16, marking the Patriots' first win in the Divisional Round and their first AFC Championship appearance since 2018. In the AFC Championship against the Denver Broncos, Maye completed 10 of 21 passes for only 86 yards due to snowy conditions, but rushed for 65 yards and one touchdown. Maye's rushing touchdown would be the Patriots' only touchdown in the 10–7 win. With the win, the Patriots advanced to Super Bowl LX against the Seattle Seahawks, their first Super Bowl appearance in seven seasons. Maye struggled in Super Bowl LX, where he completed 27 of 43 passes for 295 yards and two touchdowns, but also threw two interceptions (the second returned for a touchdown), was sacked six times, and lost a fumble as the Seahawks won 29–13.

=== 2026 ===
In Week 4 against the Buffalo Bills, Maye posted 269 passing yards with three touchdown passes, a 97.7 passer rating and 54 rushing yards and was named AFC Offensive Player of the Week. In Week 5 against the Las Vegas Raiders, Maye completed 26 of 34 passes for a career-high of 374 yards with four touchdowns, while also rushing for 25 yards with one touchdown on seven carries in the 45–17 win. Maye was named AFC Offensive Player of the Month for October after completing 67.2% of his passes (90 of 134) for 1,999 yards (299.8 per game) with 12 touchdowns to just two interceptions and another two rushing scores.

In Week 10 against the Detroit Lions in Munich, Maye suffered a knee injury after being sacked by Aidan Hutchinson, sidelining him for several weeks and potentially ending his season.

== Career statistics ==
Legend
	NFL record
	Led the league
**Bold**	Career high

=== NFL ===
==== Regular season ====
Year	Team	Games			Passing										Rushing					Sacked		Fumbles	
Year	Team	GP	GS	Record	Cmp	Att	Pct	Yds	Y/A	Y/G	Lng	TD	Int	Rtg	Att	Yds	Avg	Lng	TD	Sck	SckY	Fum	Lost
2024	NE	13	12	3–9	225	338	66.6	2,276	6.7	175.1	40	15	10	88.1	54	421	**7.8**	**41**	2	34	**229**	**9**	**6**
2025	NE	17	17	**14–3** (Note: Tied with the Denver Broncos and Seattle Seahawks.)	**354**	**492**	**72.0**	**4,394**	**8.9**	**258.5**	**72**	**31**	8	**113.5**	**103**	**450**	4.4	28	**4**	**47**	201	8	3
2026	NE	10	10	5–5	181	276	65.6	2,330	8.4	233.0	63	18	**11**	97.0	48	230	4.8	26	3	21	105	5	2
Career		40	39	22–17	760	1,106	68.7	9,000	8.1	225.0	72	64	29	101.6	205	1,101	5.4	41	9	102	535	22	11

==== Postseason ====
Year	Team	Games			Passing									Rushing					Sacked		Fumbles	
Year	Team	GP	GS	Record	Cmp	Att	Pct	Yds	Y/A	Lng	TD	Int	Rtg	Att	Yds	Y/A	Lng	TD	Sck	SckY	Fum	Lost
2025	NE	4	4	3–1	70	120	58.3	828	6.9	48	6 (Note: Tied with Matthew Stafford.)	4	82.2	29	178	6.1	37	1	21	133	7	4
Career		4	4	3–1	70	120	58.3	828	6.9	48	6	4	82.2	29	178	6.1	37	1	21	133	7	4

=== College ===
Year	Team	Games			Passing								Rushing			
Year	Team	GP	GS	Record	Comp	Att	Pct	Yards	Avg	TD	Int	Rate	Att	Yards	Avg	TD
2021	North Carolina	4	0	—	7	10	**70.0**	89	**8.9**	1	0	**177.8**	6	62	**10.3**	0
2022	North Carolina	14	14	9−5	**342**	**517**	66.2	**4,321**	8.4	**38**	7	157.9	**184**	**698**	3.8	7
2023	North Carolina	12	12	**8−4**	269	425	63.3	3,608	8.5	24	**9**	149.0	112	449	4.0	**9**
Career		30	26	17−9	618	952	64.9	8,018	8.4	63	16	154.1	302	1,209	4.0	16

== Awards and honors ==
NFL

- AFC champion (2025)
- Second-team All-Pro (2025)
- 2× Pro Bowl (2024, 2025)
- NFL passer rating leader (2025)
- NFL completion percentage leader (2025)
- Bert Bell Award (2025)
- FedEx Air & Ground Player of the Year (2025)
- Total quarterback rating leader (2025)
- AFC Offensive Player of the Month (2026: October)
- 2× AFC Offensive Player of the Week (2025: Week 13; 2026: Week 4)
- FedEx Air & Ground Player of the Week (2026: Week 5)
- NFL Top 100: 11th (2026)

College

- Shaun Alexander Award (2022)
- ACC Player of the Year (2022)
- ACC Rookie of the Year (2022)
- First-team All-ACC (2022)
- Second-team All-ACC (2023)

== Personal life ==
Maye is the youngest of four brothers: Luke and Beau played basketball at UNC, with the former shooting a buzzer beater in the Elite Eight en route to winning the 2017 national championship. Another brother, Cole, was a pitcher on the Florida Gators baseball team which won the 2017 College World Series.

Drake grew up family friends with quarterback Mason Rudolph, as their fathers played together at UNC. Drake's father Mark played quarterback at North Carolina (UNC) in the 1980s prior to playing briefly with the Tampa Bay Buccaneers and Raleigh–Durham Skyhawks. Maye is also good friends with Sam Howell, who preceded him as starting quarterback at UNC, and Caleb Williams, whom he befriended at high school football camps and was also drafted in the first round in 2024.

On June 22, 2025, Maye and Ann Michael Hudson married. They began dating in 2015 and announced their engagement in January 2025. Hudson and Maye also attended UNC together, where Hudson's younger brother, Tad backed up Maye as one of the backup quarterbacks on the Tar Heels for 2023.

Maye is a Christian. He has said, “I think the biggest thing is using my platform to spread the Word and spread the Good News.” He has also stated that he's not "200% sure" that the moon landing actually happened.
