= Ann Michael Maye =

American baker and social media influencer (born 2003)

- Born: Ann Michael Hudson; August 11, 2003 (age 23); Huntersville, North Carolina, U.S.
- Education: University of North Carolina at Chapel Hill
- Spouse: Drake Maye (m. 2025)

Ann Michael Maye (née Hudson) is an American baker and social media content creator, and wife of New England Patriots quarterback Drake Maye.

== Early life and education ==
Maye was born and raised in Huntersville, North Carolina. She attended William A. Hough High School in Cornelius, North Carolina where she played softball and field hockey and served as the president of the school's Fellowship of Christian Athletes chapter. In 2025, Maye graduated from the University of North Carolina at Chapel Hill with a degree in business administration.

== Career ==
In the summer of 2024, Maye interned at Deloitte Consulting's Government and Public Services Practice in the Summer Scholar program. Although she received a return offer, she chose not to return to the company full-time.

In December 2025, Maye launched her "Bakemas" series on TikTok, baking a new item for each day of December. The series quickly went viral and became known for its popularity among New England Patriots players and fans. Following the conclusion of her TikTok series, Maye launched a television show with NBC10 Boston called "Beyond Bakemas". The show features Maye baking with prominent New England sports figures including Dave Portnoy and David Andrews.

In January 2026, Maye partnered with JetBlue, providing cookies for the airline's flights from Boston to Denver in advance of the 2026 AFC Championship between the Patriots and Denver Broncos. Maye and JetBlue partnered again in advance of the Patriots' Super Bowl matchup with the Seattle Seahawks, with Maye providing cookies on select flights from Boston to San Francisco, the host city of the Super Bowl LX.

== Personal life ==
Maye married Patriots quarterback Drake Maye on June 22, 2025. The pair began dating in middle school. Her younger brother, Tad Hudson, was Maye's backup on the Tar Heels in 2023 before he transferred to Coastal Carolina University.
