= Cameron Moore =

Cameron Moore may refer to:

- Cameron Moore (basketball) (1990–2016), American professional basketball player
- Cameron Moore (musician) (born 1994), American singer-songwriter
