= Huntersville, North Carolina =

- Town
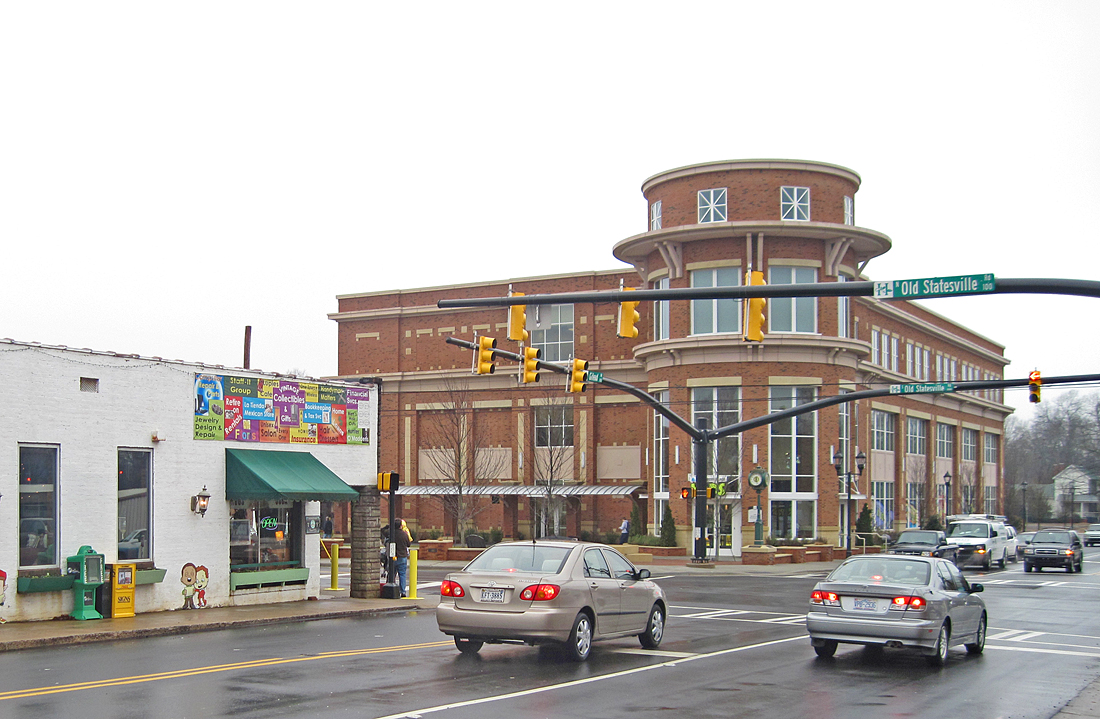
- Downtown Huntersville

- Seal Logo
- Nickname: H-Town
- Interactive map of Huntersville, North Carolina
- Coordinates: 35°24′22″N 80°52′18″W
- Country: United States
- State: North Carolina
- County: Mecklenburg
- Incorporated: 1873
- Named for: Robert Hunter

Government
  - Type: Council-Manager
  - Mayor: Christy Clark

Area
  - Total: 42.06 sq mi (108.9 km^{2})
  - Land: 41.85 sq mi (108.4 km^{2})
  - Water: 0.21 sq mi (0.54 km^{2}) 0.50%
- Elevation: 692 ft (211 m)

Population (2020)
  - Total: 61,376
  - Estimate (2023): 64,688
  - Rank: 15th in North Carolina
  - Density: 1,545.9/sq mi (596.9/km^{2})
- Time zone: UTC−5 (Eastern (EST))
  - Summer (DST): UTC−4 (EDT)
- ZIP Codes: 28070, 28078 (Huntersville); 28031 (Cornelius)
- Area codes: 704, 980
- FIPS code: 37-33120
- GNIS feature ID: 2405873
- Website: www.huntersville.org

Huntersville is a suburban town in northern Mecklenburg County, North Carolina, United States. As of the 2020 census, its population was 61,376, making Huntersville the 15th-most populous municipality in North Carolina. It is located in the Charlotte metropolitan area and is 14 mi (23 km) north of Charlotte.

== History and etymology ==
Originally named "Craighead", the town was renamed to honor Robert Boston Hunter, a local cotton farmer and land owner. The town was incorporated in 1873.

== Geography ==
Huntersville is in northern Mecklenburg County, bordered to the south by Charlotte and to the north by the town of Cornelius. The town has several exclaves to the east, some bordered to the north by the town of Davidson and some bordered to the east by the city of Concord in Cabarrus County.

Huntersville is located 14 miles (23 km) north of Uptown Charlotte. Interstate 77 passes through the middle of the town, with access from Exits 23 (Gilead Road) and 25 (North Carolina Highway 73). I-77 leads south into Charlotte and north 27 miles (43 km) to Statesville. U.S. Route 21 (Statesville Road) parallels I-77, while North Carolina Highway 115 (Old Statesville Road) passes through the Huntersville town center. NC 73 runs through the northern side of Huntersville, leading east 16 miles (26 km) to Concord and west 25 miles (40 km) to Lincolnton.

According to the U.S. Census Bureau, the town of Huntersville has a total area of 42.1 square miles (109 km^{2}), of which -41.8 square miles (108 km^{2}) are land and 0.2 square miles (0.5 km^{2}), or 0.50%, are water. The majority of the town (the area west of NC 115) drains to the southwest via McDowell Creek, a tributary of the Catawba River within Mountain Island Lake. The northwestern border of the town follows the shore of Lake Norman, a large impoundment on the Catawba River. East of NC 115, the town is drained by tributaries of Clarke Creek, a tributary of the Rocky River and part of the Pee Dee River watershed.

== Demographics ==
Historical population
| Census | Pop. | Note | %± |
|---|---|---|---|
| 1890 | 431 | | — |
| 1900 | 533 | | 23.7% |
| 1910 | 591 | | 10.9% |
| 1920 | 833 | | 40.9% |
| 1930 | 800 | | −4.0% |
| 1940 | 763 | | −4.6% |
| 1950 | 916 | | 20.1% |
| 1960 | 1,004 | | 9.6% |
| 1970 | 1,538 | | 53.2% |
| 1980 | 1,294 | | −15.9% |
| 1990 | 3,014 | | 132.9% |
| 2000 | 24,960 | | 728.1% |
| 2010 | 46,773 | | 87.4% |
| 2020 | 61,376 | | 31.2% |
| 2025 (est.) | 68,535 | ▲ | 11.7% |
U.S. Decennial Census; 2020

=== Racial and ethnic composition ===
Huntersville town, North Carolina – Racial and ethnic composition Note: the US Census treats Hispanic/Latino as an ethnic category. This table excludes Latinos from the racial categories and assigns them to a separate category. Hispanics/Latinos may be of any race.
| Race / Ethnicity (NH = Non-Hispanic) | Pop 2000 | Pop 2010 | Pop 2020 | % 2000 | % 2010 | % 2020 |
|---|---|---|---|---|---|---|
| White alone (NH) | 21,497 | 36,791 | 42,816 | 86.13% | 78.66% | 69.76% |
| Black or African American alone (NH) | 1,830 | 4,320 | 7,203 | 7.33% | 9.24% | 11.74% |
| Native American or Alaska Native alone (NH) | 91 | 107 | 117 | 0.36% | 0.23% | 0.19% |
| Asian alone (NH) | 374 | 1,234 | 2,545 | 1.50% | 2.64% | 4.15% |
| Native Hawaiian or Pacific Islander alone (NH) | 11 | 17 | 9 | 0.04% | 0.04% | 0.01% |
| Other race alone (NH) | 6 | 91 | 258 | 0.02% | 0.19% | 0.42% |
| Mixed race or Multiracial (NH) | 183 | 772 | 2,482 | 0.73% | 1.65% | 4.04% |
| Hispanic or Latino (any race) | 968 | 3,441 | 5,946 | 3.88% | 7.36% | 9.69% |
| Total | 24,960 | 46,773 | 61,376 | 100.00% | 100.00% | 100.00% |

=== 2020 census ===
As of the 2020 census, Huntersville had a population of 61,376. The median age was 37.5 years. 26.0% of residents were under the age of 18 and 11.3% of residents were 65 years of age or older. For every 100 females there were 94.3 males, and for every 100 females age 18 and over there were 91.0 males age 18 and over.

There were 23,037 households in Huntersville, of which 38.3% had children under the age of 18 living in them. Of all households, 58.8% were married-couple households, 13.2% were households with a male householder and no spouse or partner present, and 22.2% were households with a female householder and no spouse or partner present. About 22.0% of all households were made up of individuals and 6.2% had someone living alone who was 65 years of age or older. As of the 2020 census, there were 14,960 families residing in the town.

There were 23,962 housing units, of which 3.9% were vacant. The homeowner vacancy rate was 1.0% and the rental vacancy rate was 5.4%.

96.2% of residents lived in urban areas, while 3.8% lived in rural areas.

=== 2010 census ===
At the 2010 census, there were 46,773 people, 9,171 households, and 6,859 families residing in the town. The population density was 801.4 inhabitants per square mile (309.4/km^{2}). There were 9,859 housing units at an average density of 316.5 per square mile (122.2/km^{2}). The racial makeup of the town was 88.42% White, 7.47% African American, 0.37% Native American, 1.50% Asian, 0.05% Pacific Islander, 1.06% from other races, and 1.13% from two or more races. Hispanic or Latino of any race were 3.88% of the population.

There were 9,171 households, out of which 41.9% had children under the age of 18 living with them, 64.6% were married couples living together, 7.5% had a female householder with no husband present, and 25.2% were non-families. 19.2% of all households were made up of individuals, and 3.4% had someone living alone who was 65 years of age or older. The average household size was 2.67 and the average family size was 3.09.

Despite the rapid growth and 9,171 households, and 6,859 families as of 2010, crime remained relatively low.

In the town, the population was spread out, with 28.3% under the age of 18, 6.2% from 18 to 24, 40.7% from 25 to 44, 18.6% from 45 to 64, and 6.2% who were 65 years of age or older. The median age was 33 years. For every 100 females, there were 97.6 males. For every 100 females age 18 and over, there were 96.0 males.

=== Income and poverty ===
The median income for a household in the town was $71,932, and the median income for a family was $80,821 (these figures had risen to $80,328 and $90,739 respectively as of a 2007.) Males had a median income of $53,553 versus $33,877 for females. The per capita income for the town was $30,256. 3.1% of the population and 1.9% of families were below the poverty line.

== Economy ==
Joe Gibbs Racing is based in Huntersville. The team has five NASCAR Cup Series drivers championships with Bobby Labonte, Tony Stewart and Kyle Busch, and has won over 190 Cup races.

== Arts and culture ==
=== Museums ===
- Discovery Place Kids-Huntersville
- EnergyExplorium at McGuire Nuclear Station
- Holly Bend
- Hugh Torance House & Store
- Latta Place

=== Festivals and events ===
The Carolina Renaissance Festival operates Saturdays and Sundays in October and November.

=== Library ===
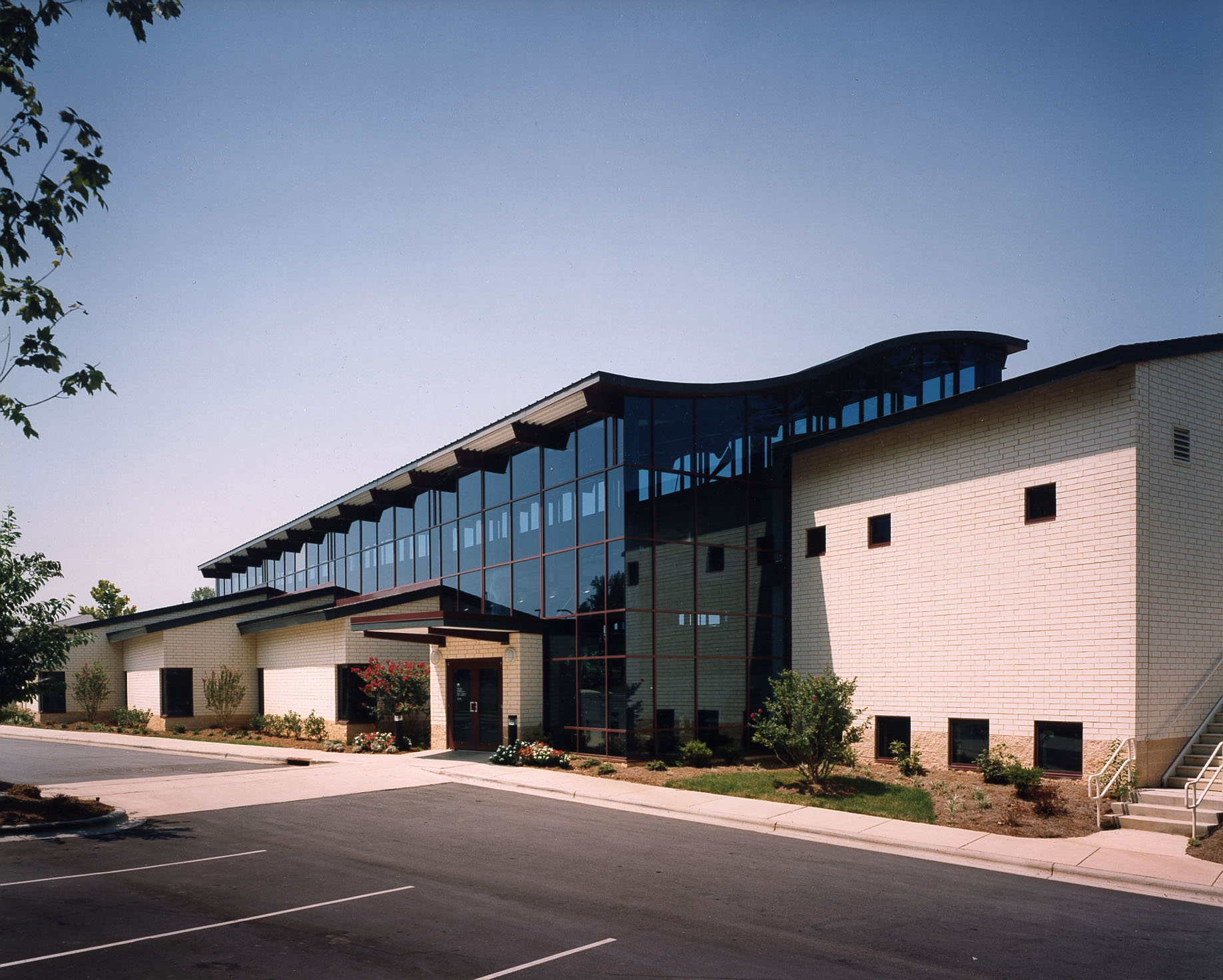
The North County branch (located in Huntersville) of the Public Library of Charlotte and Mecklenburg County

Huntersville and the surrounding area is served by the North County Regional branch of the Public Library of Charlotte and Mecklenburg County.

== Parks and recreation ==
The town is known recreationally as a lake community because of its proximity to Lake Norman, a large man-made lake created by Duke Power to serve the nuclear power plant, and Mountain Island Lake, a smaller man-made lake that is used as Charlotte's city water source and located along the southwest border of Huntersville. The lakes attract both boaters and water-skiers from several surrounding states. Huntersville is also home to one private golf course, NorthStone Country Club and two Semi-Private courses; Skybrook Golf Club and Birkdale Golf Course.

== Government ==
The town is governed by an elected mayor and a board of commissioners and elections are officially conducted on a non-partisan basis. Elections are held every two years with the mayor and commissioners being elected separately. There is no primary election for either mayor or the board of commissioners. Voters are allowed to vote for up to six commissioner candidates and the six candidates receiving the highest number of votes are elected.

The current mayor and town board after the November 7, 2023, election: Mayor Christy Clark and Commissioners Jennifer Hunt, Nick Walsh, Edwin Quarles, Alisia Bergsman, Amanda Dumas, and LaToya Rivers.

== Education ==
School age children in Huntersville attending public schools are part of the Charlotte-Mecklenburg Schools system.

=== Elementary schools ===
- Barnette Elementary
- Legette Blythe Elementary
- Huntersville Elementary
- Torrence Creek Elementary
- Grand Oak Elementary
- Long Creek Elementary School
- Hornets Nest Elementary School
- Trillium Springs Montessori

=== Middle schools ===
- John M. Alexander Middle School
- Francis Bradley Middle
- Bailey Middle in Cornelius has an attendance boundary that includes a section of Huntersville

=== High schools ===
- Hopewell High School
- North Mecklenburg High School
- William A. Hough High School in Cornelius has a boundary that includes a section of Huntersville.

=== Charter schools ===
- Lake Norman Charter School
- Bonnie Cone Classical Academy
- Aspire Trade High School

=== Private schools ===
- Children's Community School
- SouthLake Christian Academy
- St Mark Catholic School
- Christ the King Catholic High School
- Cannon School
- The Halton School

=== Post secondary ===
- Central Piedmont Community College (Merancas Campus)

== Media ==
The town is served by six weekly newspapers, including The Herald Citizen.

== Infrastructure ==
=== Transportation ===
Huntersville is one of three towns (the others are Cornelius and Davidson) located north of Charlotte but still within Mecklenburg County. These three towns make up the area known as "North Meck". Express bus transportation and an interstate with HOV lanes that end 5 miles (8 km) south of Huntersville provide access to the downtown business areas of Charlotte.

Two exits from Interstate 77 serve Huntersville. Exit 23 (Gilead Road) connects the expressway with the original town. Exit 25 (North Carolina Highway 73, but most often referred to as Sam Furr Road) provides access to the Birkdale Village area and shopping, medical, and office complexes that have been built since the exit opened.

U.S. Highway 21 (Statesville Road) and North Carolina Highway 115 (Old Statesville Road) are the two main north–south arterial roads through the town. These two routes complement I-77 south to Charlotte and north to Mooresville and Statesville, which are both in adjacent Iredell County.

== Notable people ==
- Elizabeth Bradford, painter
- Harrison Burton, NASCAR driver
- Luke Combs, country singer and songwriter
- Brandyn Curry, professional basketball player
- Blake Koch, NASCAR driver and businessman
- Ann Michael Maye, baker and social media influencer, wife of New England Patriots quarterback Drake Maye
- Drake Maye, NFL quarterback for the New England Patriots
- Luke Maye, professional basketball player, 2017 NCAA champion with North Carolina
- Cameron Moore, Christian pop singer/songwriter
- Bailey Ober, MLB pitcher
- Elliot Panicco, professional soccer player
- Reneé Rapp, actress and singer
- Ryder Ryan, baseball player
- Drew P. Saunders, former member of the North Carolina General Assembly
- Ben Shields, former Major League Baseball pitcher
- Andrea Stinson, former WNBA player
- Daniel Suárez, NASCAR driver
- Thom Tillis, U.S. senator; former Speaker of the North Carolina House of Representatives
- Jim Vandiver, NASCAR Winston Cup Series driver from 1968 to 1983
- Hoyt Wilhelm, Major League Baseball pitcher and member of the National Baseball Hall of Fame

== See also ==
- List of municipalities in North Carolina
