= Jerry K. Crump =

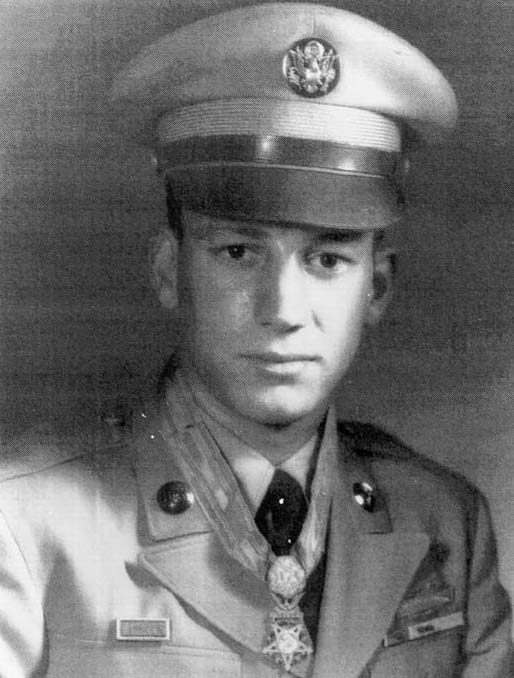
- Medal of Honor recipient Jerry Crump
- Born: February 18, 1933; Charlotte, North Carolina, U.S.
- Died: January 10, 1977 (aged 43); Lincoln County, North Carolina, U.S.
- Burial place: Mt. Zion Methodist Church, Cornelius, North Carolina
- Military career
- Allegiance: United States
- Branch: United States Army
- Rank: Master Sergeant
- Units: Company L, 7th Infantry Regiment, 3rd Infantry Division
- Conflicts: Korean War
- Awards: Medal of Honor; Purple Heart

Jerry Kirt Crump (February 18, 1933 – January 10, 1977) was a soldier in the United States Army during the Korean War. He received the Medal of Honor for his actions on September 6 and 7, 1951. He was presented the Medal of Honor on June 27, 1952, at The White House Rose Garden by President Harry S. Truman.

== Medal of Honor citation ==
Rank and organization: Corporal, U.S. Army, Company L, 7th Infantry Regiment, 3rd Infantry Division

Place and date: Near Chorwon, Korea, 6 and September 7, 1951

Entered service at: Forest City, N.C. Born: February 18, 1933, Charlotte, N.C.

G.O. No.: 68, July 11, 1952

Citation:

Cpl. Crump, a member of Company L, distinguished himself by conspicuous gallantry and outstanding courage above and beyond the call of duty in action against the enemy. During the night a numerically superior hostile force launched an assault against his platoon on Hill 284, overrunning friendly positions and swarming into the sector. Cpl. Crump repeatedly exposed himself to deliver effective fire into the ranks of the assailants, inflicting numerous casualties. Observing 2 enemy soldiers endeavoring to capture a friendly machine gun, he charged and killed both with his bayonet, regaining control of the weapon. Returning to his position, now occupied by 4 of his wounded comrades, he continued his accurate fire into enemy troops surrounding his emplacement. When a hostile soldier hurled a grenade into the position, Cpl. Crump immediately flung himself over the missile, absorbing the blast with his body and saving his comrades from death or serious injury. His aggressive actions had so inspired his comrades that a spirited counterattack drove the enemy from the perimeter. Cpl. Crump's heroic devotion to duty, indomitable fighting spirit, and willingness to sacrifice himself to save his comrades reflect the highest credit upon himself, the infantry and the U.S. Army.

== Awards and decorations ==

Badge	Combat Infantryman Badge		
1st row	Medal of Honor		Purple Heart with 1 Oak leaf cluster
2nd row	Army Good Conduct Medal with 2 Good Conduct Loops	National Defense Service Medal with 1 Oak leaf cluster	Korean Service Medal with 3 Campaign stars
3rd row	Armed Forces Expeditionary Medal	United Nations Service Medal Korea	Korean War Service Medal
Unit awards	Presidential Unit Citation		Korean Presidential Unit Citation

== Later life and death ==
Crump retired from the U.S. Army in 1976. He was married to his wife Shirley, with whom he had two daughters. He died on January 10, 1977 in a car accident that was a result of a piece of shrapnel from that incident on Hill 284 in September 1951, which had broken loose and punctured an artery causing him to lose consciousness. In reality, Cpl. Jerry Crump died of his injuries–26 years after being wounded in Korea.

== Legacy ==
Cornelius Veteran's Monument in Cornelius, North Carolina features a bronze portrait statue of Cpl. Jerry K. Crump, dedicated on July 4, 2017.

== See also ==
- List of Medal of Honor recipients
- List of Korean War Medal of Honor recipients
