= Total quarterback rating =

American football statistic

Total quarterback rating (abbreviated as total QBR or simply QBR) is a proprietary statistic created by ESPN in 2011 to grade the performance of quarterbacks in American football games. ESPN claims that it created QBR to be a more meaningful alternative to the traditional passer rating statistic by incorporating "all of a quarterback's contributions to winning, including how he impacts the game on passes, rushes, turnovers, and penalties. Since QBR is built from the play level, it accounts for a team's level of success or failure on every play to provide the proper context, then allocates credit to the quarterback and his teammates to produce a clearer measure of quarterback efficiency." However, ESPN has never released the complete formulas and procedures to calculate QBR, resulting in criticism among fans and commentators alike questioning the results.

== History and development ==
Total QBR was developed by a team at ESPN Stats & Information Group including Jeff Bennett, Dean Oliver, Alok Pattani, Albert Larcada, and Menlo College professor Ben Alamar. The group also received input from ESPN analysts Trent Dilfer, Jon Gruden, and Ron Jaworski. Total QBR was developed based on analysis of 60,000 NFL plays between 2008 and 2010, and was unveiled on August 5, 2011. The formula was modified in 2012 and again in 2013.

== Characteristics ==
There are six steps to building QBR:

- Each QB "action play" (passes, rushes, sacks, scrambles, or penalties attributable to the QB) is measured in terms of the expected points added (EPA)
- Adjust for the difficulty of each play. EPA is adjusted based on the type and depth of a pass, and whether the QB was pressured.
- If there is a completion, he only is credited for the typical number of yards after the catch (passer rating takes all yards into effect) based on the type and depth of the pass
- There is a discount on garbage time, or a time when the score is out of reach near the end of the game.
- Opponent adjustment: More credit is given with tougher defenses and vice versa.
- QBR averages the adjusted EPA per play and transforms it to a 0 to 100 scale, with 50 being average.

== Summary of computation ==
Raw QBR is calculated as the following:

$\mathrm{Raw QBR} = g\left(\mathrm{\frac{Adjusted EPA}{Action Plays}}\right)$,

where g() is a function that scales from 0 to 100, where 50 is average. Total QBR is the raw QBR adjusted for the strength of the opponent.

EPA is calculated based on the down, distance, and the yard line at snap, with each combination having its own point value. The point values are the average net point advantage the team on offense can expect given the particular down, distance, and field position. For example, a 1st and goal chance on the opponents' 1-yard line heavily favors the offense, yielding a positive point value. On the other hand, a 3rd and 9 on the team's own 3-yard line is heavily negative because it drastically favors the opponent.

The value of each play's outcome is measured by the snap-to-snap change in expected points. This is called expected points added. The expected points added (or lost) in each play are divided among the contributing players on the field based on the role of each player and the type of play. Deeper throws give a higher share of credit to the QB, while screen passes give relatively less credit to the QB and more to the receiver.

Plays that occur in “trash time” are discounted by as much as 30%. Trash time is measured based on the leverage of each play which is primarily a function of score, time, and field position. Important, critical plays that are likely to change the outcome have high leverage, while plays that occur after the game has largely been already decided have low leverage. QBR discounts low leverage plays, but does not boost credit for “clutch” plays.

After each play's expected points added are adjusted for difficulty, division of credit, and trash time, it is averaged on a per play basis. This average is further adjusted to account for the strength of opponent. Performance against a stronger defense that tends to allow low adjusted EPA per play is adjusted upwards while performance against a weaker defense is adjusted downwards. The degree of adjustment is in direct proportion to the strength of the opponent.

Lastly, the resulting adjusted EPA per play is transformed to a 0 to 100 scale, where 50 is average. The result can be thought of as a percentile. For example, a QBR of 80 means that the QB's performance is better than 80% of the game performances by QB's since 2006. A game QBR of 80 would also mean that, given that QB's performance, his team would be expected to win that game on average 80% of the time.

=== Comparison to NFL passer rating ===
According to ESPN, QBR is a more complete and meaningful alternative to the passer rating, which remains the official National Football League measure of quarterback performance. The calculation of the NFL passer rating is much simpler than the QBR, as it depends only on passing statistics rather than an analysis of each play a quarterback is involved in. Because of this, some consider QBR to be a more holistic account of a quarterback's performance.

The QBR calculation accounts for several meaningful statistics that are not included in passer rating, such as throwing distance, sacks, fumbles, designed runs and scrambles. QBR also makes adjustments for situational context with "EPA"—a dynamic statistic that is meant to signify "expected points added" per play.

== Example of total QBR ==
Total QBR takes each individual play and measures the expected points added (EPA) for each play. Since every play situation is different, there is a different value for EPA in each case. A team can expect a 0.9 net-point advantage when it is 1st down and 10 yards to go on their own 20-yard line. For the next play, suppose the team passes the ball 8 yards to reach their own 28-yard line to make it 2nd down and 2. The offense can now expect a 1.4 net-point advantage. EPA is the difference in the expected points at the start and end of a play. In this case it is 1.4 − 0.9 = 0.5 EPA. In a way, the offense has added a half point in potential score based on this play. Similarly, if a team loses yardage on a play, their EPA in that situation would be negative.

Total QBR takes EPA and adjusts it based on the difficulty of the play. If a quarterback is under duress and avoids a sack to throw a 10-yard pass, Total QBR will reward the quarterback in those situations more than a 10-yard pass with much time to throw. In addition, it understands the importance of depth of target: the quarterback is rewarded more for a 40-yard pass compared to a 10-yard pass where the receiver ran for an extra 30 yards.

There is a discount on trash time. A 40-yard pass as time expires (without scoring a touchdown or field goal) is much different from a 40-yard pass with enough time to score points.

Total QBR takes into account the level of difficulty the opponent team's defense is based on the opponents' defensive FPI, among other factors.

Conceptualizing the detail total QBR puts in can be explained through the 2015 NFC Wild Card game between the Green Bay Packers and the Washington Redskins. Aaron Rodgers of the Packers completed 21 of 36 passes for 210 yards, 2 touchdowns, and 0 interceptions, which computes to a 93.5 passer rating. Kirk Cousins of the Redskins completed 29 of 46 passes for 329 yards with 1 touchdown and 0 interceptions, computing a 91.7 passer rating. Observing these statistics, one is likely to conclude that Cousins and Rodgers had similar success and that it was likely a close game. However, the Packers won 35–18, and much of the reason for that can be attributed to Rodgers' overall play, not just his passing numbers.

Traditional passer statistics omit the rest of the impact that these quarterbacks made. Cousins also took 6 sacks, had 3 fumbles (1 lost), and 2 pre-snap penalties on Washington's offense. Rodgers, on the other hand, took only one sack, did not fumble, and drew a number of defensive penalties to keep drives alive. Rodgers manufactured five scoring drives, posting an 82.4 total QBR. Cousins’ errors resulted in a Total QBR of just 58.9 and were a big factor in Washington losing the game.

== Reception ==
Total QBR is a complex proprietary statistic that has led to questions on what values are being used and to what degree. The data obtained is from a video analyst tracking system instead of an eye test grading system, similar to a football scout.

Unlike the NFL passer rating, ESPN has not yet been forthcoming on the exact specific formulas and procedures to calculate QBR. The proprietary, complex methodology spans some 10,000 lines of code. In an interview with San Diego's XX Sports Radio, San Diego Chargers quarterback Philip Rivers seemed baffled by the ratings, which put him ninth overall in its metrics for the 2010 season, saying "I still don't get it. I think it's more complicated now."

In an op-ed piece published by Deadspin, they opine that the clutch index component of the QBR "looks like a weirdly applied version of baseball's leverage metric and which, tellingly, is the sort of mindless branding you get when the network of 'Who's Now' starts dicking around with numbers.".

Michael David Smith of Profootballtalk.com explained the major drawback of QBR:

One of the aspects of Total QBR that could be both a strength and a drawback is that it considers data that the average fan doesn’t have access to, like how far a pass travels in the air, and whether the quarterback was under pressure when he threw it ... it means fans can't see for themselves exactly where Total QBR comes from—fans just have to trust that the distance the ball traveled was correctly measured, and how much pressure the quarterback felt on the play was correctly assessed ... If ESPN is committed to this stat and is able to clearly and concisely explain it on the Worldwide Leader’s NFL broadcasts, then fans will quickly become familiar with it and it will soon become a staple of how we talk about quarterbacks. On the other hand, if the stat comes across as too convoluted — or if it doesn’t really seem like much of an improvement on the current passer rating — then this will all feel like a rather pointless exercise.

Further criticism of QBR was brought about when, before some tinkering with the equation of QBR, Pittsburgh Steelers quarterback Charlie Batch had the greatest individual game ever evaluated by QBR with a score of 99.9 against the Tampa Bay Buccaneers on September 26, 2010. Batch threw for 186 yards with three touchdowns and two interceptions in the game. He also ran five times for 26 yards. Statistics that helped Batch's QBR rise were that he was not sacked, did not fumble, and that he completed 70.6% of his passes, one of which he spiked into the ground to stop the clock.

On the other side, noted football author and researcher Brian Burke of Advanced NFL Stats opined that QBR was superior to the traditional passer rating. The main advantages, in his opinion, are QBR's accounting for many more events in quarterback play than the old rating, and the fact that it avoids the double-counting that plagues the official NFL passer rating. He did however lament the proprietary nature of the statistic, and predicted it would not become widely used so long as its precise computation details were kept secret (i.e., it is unlikely that CBS, Fox, NBC, and other competing media outlets would want to heavily promote something that is proprietary to ESPN).

Further controversy erupted when the Total QBR system gave the Denver Broncos' Tim Tebow a higher rating than the Green Bay Packers' Aaron Rodgers in their respective Week 5 contests in 2011. Noting that Rodgers completed 26 of 39 passes for 396 yards and two touchdowns in a win over the Atlanta Falcons, while Tebow completed four of 10 passes for 79 yards and a touchdown, and six rushes for 38 yards and a touchdown, in a loss to the San Diego Chargers. Mike Florio of Profootballtalk.com wrote that he'll "continue to ignore ESPN’s Total QBR stat." Rodgers himself was surprised: "I saw the [QBR stats] and chuckled to myself. I played a full game, [Tebow] played the half. He completed four passes, I completed 26. I think it incorporates QB runs as well ... The weighting of it doesn't make a whole lot of sense." ESPN's Stats and Information Group explained that Tebow's higher rating was the result of him staging a partial comeback, taking no sacks, and having positive rushing yards and a rushing touchdown, among other factors. However, Doug Farrar of Yahoo! Sports wrote that the QBR system lacks a minimum performance frequency floor that players must meet before they can be rated, and thus it essentially penalizes Rodgers because he played throughout the entire game, while rewarding Tebow because he came off the bench in the second half in an attempt to stage a comeback. In a more recent example, a game played on September 24, 2017, Alex Smith of Kansas City Chiefs received an inexplicable QBR of 7.8, half as much as the equally-bad QBR of 16.1 for his counterpart Philip Rivers of the Los Angeles Chargers, even though Smith had a higher completion rate (16/21 vs. 20/40), a better average per completion (7.8 yds vs. 5.9), a far superior TD/int ratio (2-0 vs. 0-3), and won the game handily 24-10. For comparison, the RTG, 128.1 for Smith and 37.2 for Rivers, was by far a better metric of success.

== NFL QBR records ==
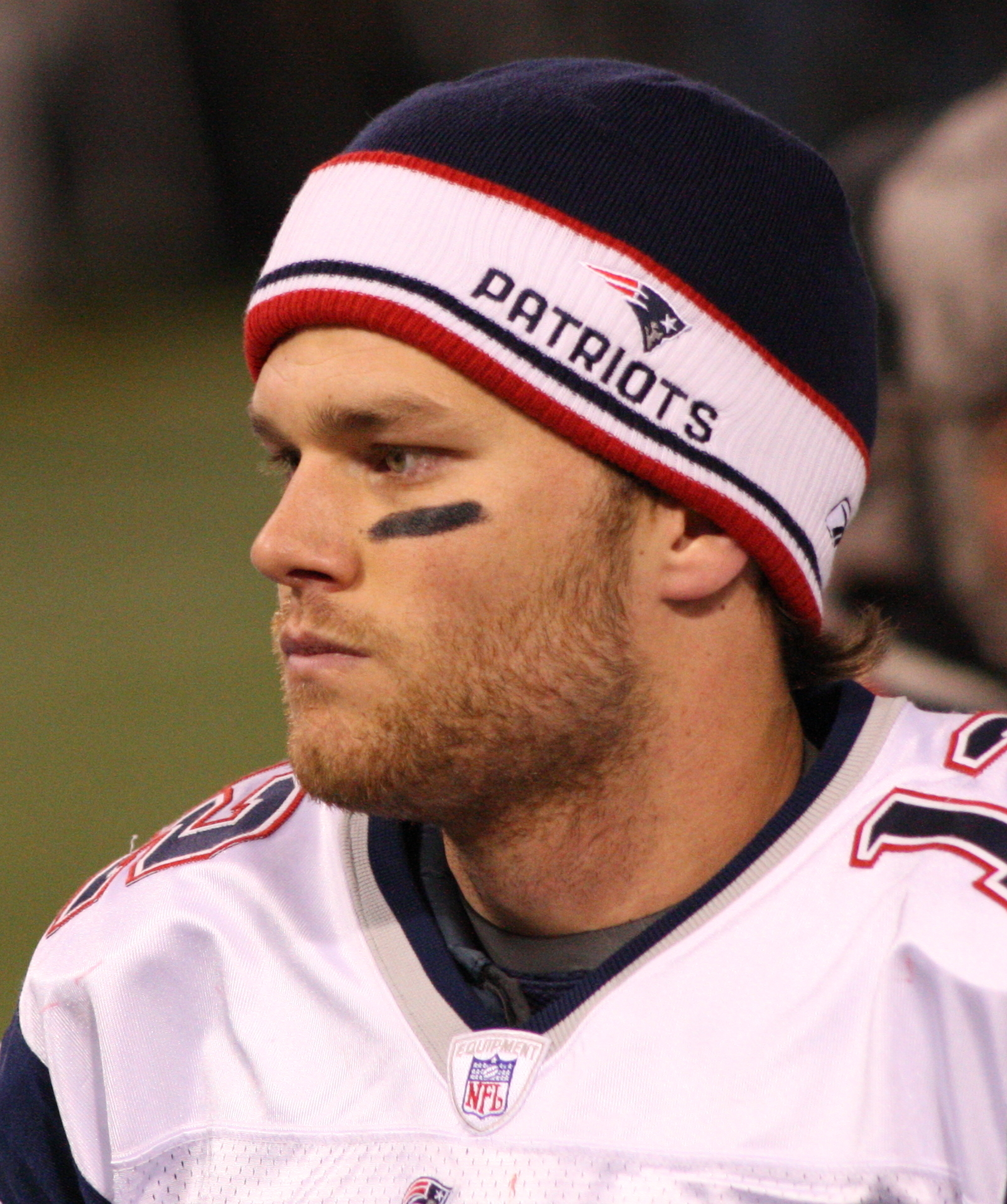
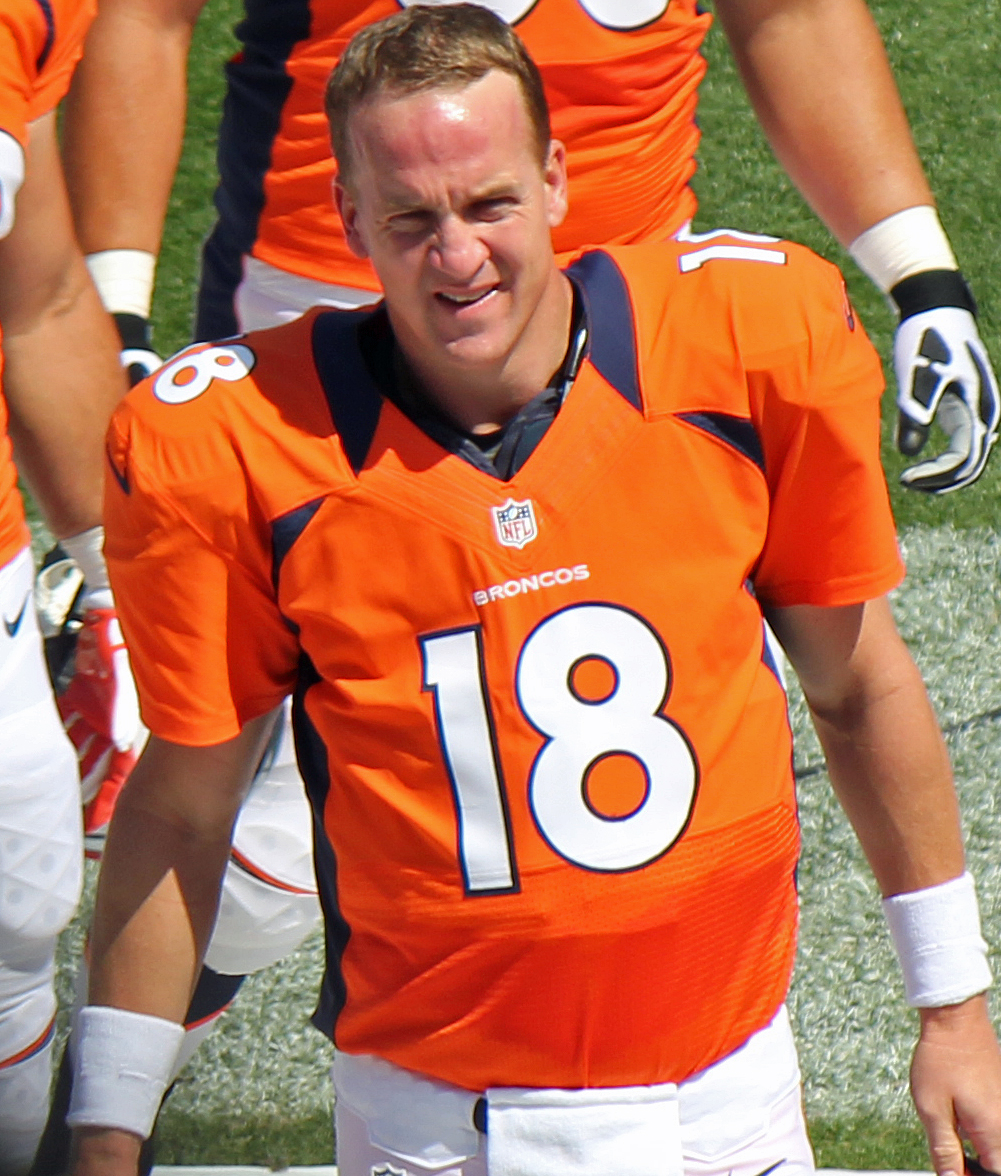
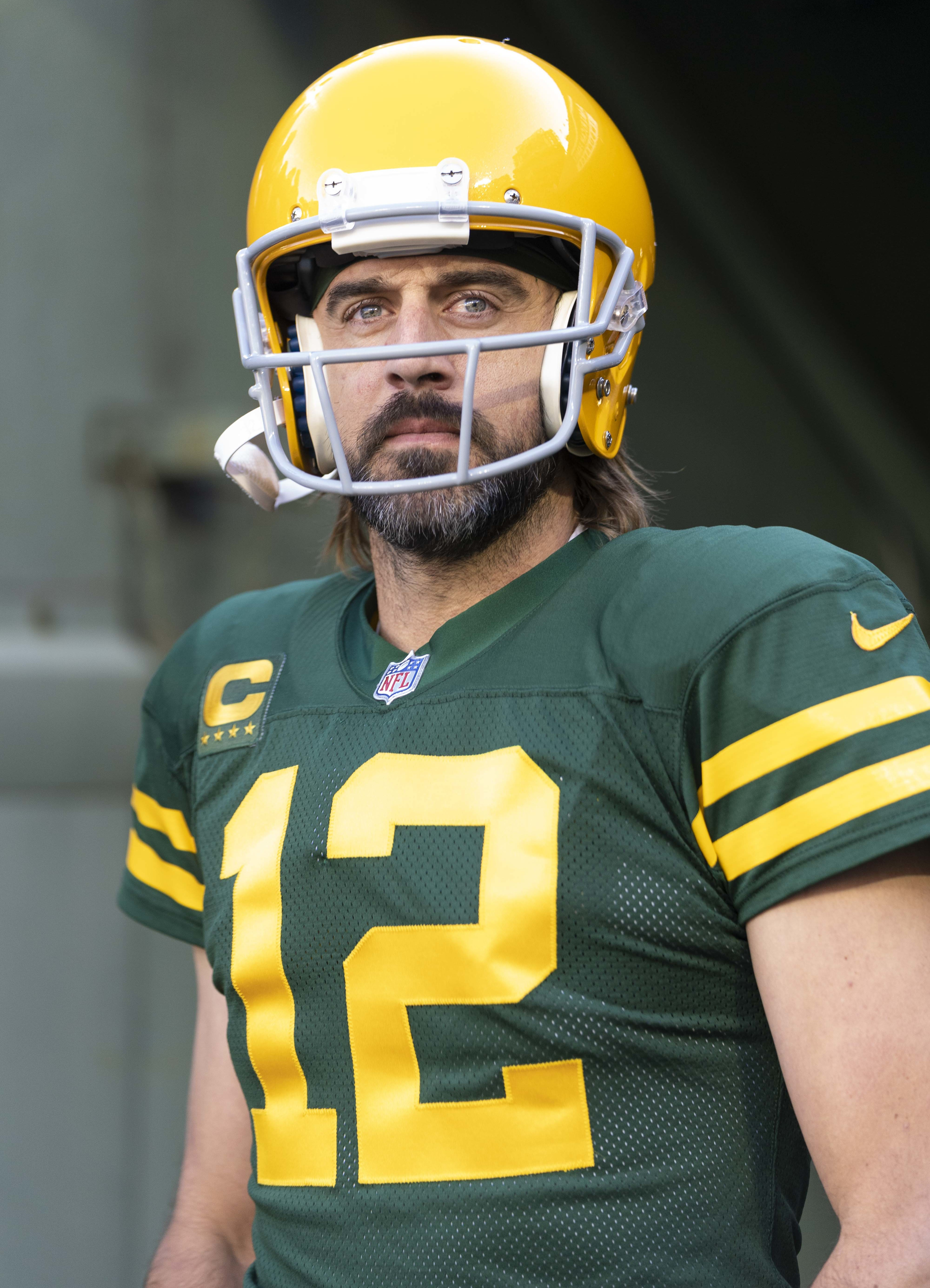
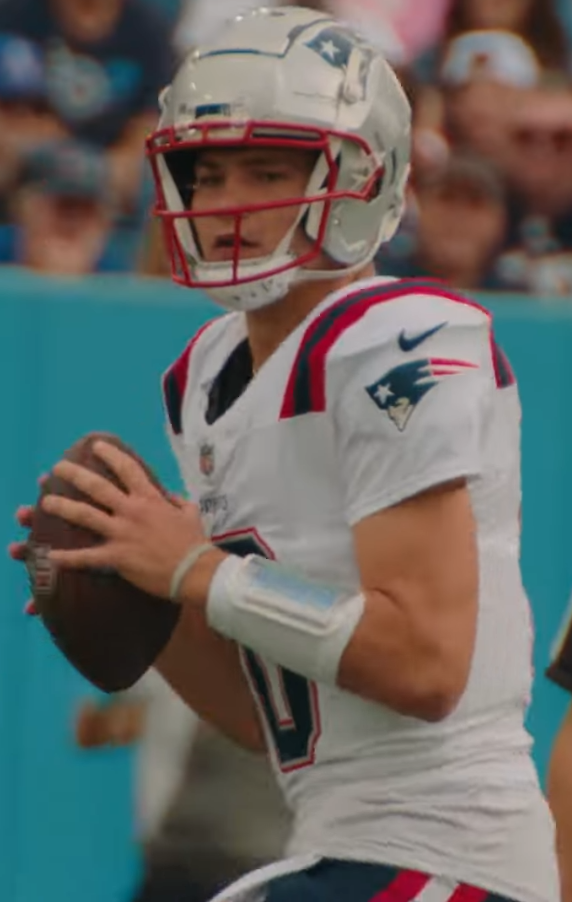
- Top left: Tom Brady during the 2007 season, when he set the all-time single-season QBR record.
- Top right: Peyton Manning in 2012, when he had the third of his record-four times leading the league in QBR.
- Bottom left: Aaron Rodgers in 2021, his third season leading the league in QBR. His 69.1 QBR that season is the lowest figure to ever lead the league.
- Bottom right: Drake Maye during the 2025 season is the most recent QBR leader.

=== Single season QBR leaders ===
Rank	Season	Player	QBR	Team
1.	2007	Tom Brady	88.2	New England Patriots
2.	2006	Peyton Manning	87.5	Indianapolis Colts
3.	2011	Aaron Rodgers	85.5	Green Bay Packers
4.	2020	Aaron Rodgers	84.4	Green Bay Packers
5.	2011	Drew Brees	84.3	New Orleans Saints
6.	2009	Drew Brees	84.2	New Orleans Saints
7.	2016	Matt Ryan	83.3	Atlanta Falcons
8.	2016	Tom Brady	83.0	New England Patriots
9.	2009	Peyton Manning	82.8	Indianapolis Colts
10.	2007	David Garrard	82.5	Jacksonville Jaguars

=== Season-by-season QBR leaders ===
The following is a list of the season-by-season leaders of the QBR statistic in the NFL:

Season	Player	QBR	Team
2006	Peyton Manning	87.5	Indianapolis Colts
2007	Tom Brady	88.2	New England Patriots
2008	Peyton Manning (2)	78.0	Indianapolis Colts
2009	Drew Brees	84.2	New Orleans Saints
2010	Tom Brady (2)	81.3	New England Patriots
2011	Aaron Rodgers	85.5	Green Bay Packers
2012	Peyton Manning (3)	81.3	Denver Broncos
2013	Peyton Manning (4)	82.2	Denver Broncos
2014	Tony Romo	81.5	Dallas Cowboys
2015	Carson Palmer	78.6	Arizona Cardinals
2016	Matt Ryan	83.3	Atlanta Falcons
2017	Carson Wentz	74.4	Philadelphia Eagles
2018	Patrick Mahomes	81.8	Kansas City Chiefs
2019	Lamar Jackson	81.8	Baltimore Ravens
2020	Aaron Rodgers (2)	84.4	Green Bay Packers
2021	Aaron Rodgers (3)	74.1	Green Bay Packers
2022	Patrick Mahomes (2)	77.6	Kansas City Chiefs
2023	Brock Purdy	72.8	San Francisco 49ers
2024	Josh Allen	77.3 (tied)	Buffalo Bills
2024	Lamar Jackson (2)	77.3 (tied)	Baltimore Ravens
2025	Drake Maye	77.2	New England Patriots

== Most seasons leading the league ==
Count	Player	Seasons	Team(s)
4	Peyton Manning	2006, 2008, 2012, 2013	Indianapolis Colts / Denver Broncos
3	Aaron Rodgers	2011, 2020, 2021	Green Bay Packers
2	Lamar Jackson	2019, 2024	Baltimore Ravens
2	Patrick Mahomes	2018, 2022	Kansas City Chiefs
2	Tom Brady	2007, 2010	New England Patriots
