= Holly Bend =

Historic house in North Carolina, United States

- U.S. National Register of Historic Places
- Location within North Carolina Location within the United States
- Location: W of Huntersville on SR 2720, near Huntersville, North Carolina
- Coordinates: 35°23′3″N 80°57′51″W
- Area: 8 acres (3.2 ha)
- Built: c. 1795-1800
- NRHP reference No.: 72000977
- Added to NRHP: March 24, 1972

Holly Bend, also known as Hollywood, is a historic plantation house located near Huntersville, Mecklenburg County, North Carolina. It was built between 1795 and 1800, and is a two-story, five bay by two bay, frame dwelling with Federal style design elements. It has gable roof, brick exterior end chimneys, and a one-story, full-width, hip roof porch.

It was listed on the National Register of Historic Places in 1972.
