= Potts Plantation =

Historic farm in North Carolina, United States

- U.S. National Register of Historic Places
- U.S. Historic district
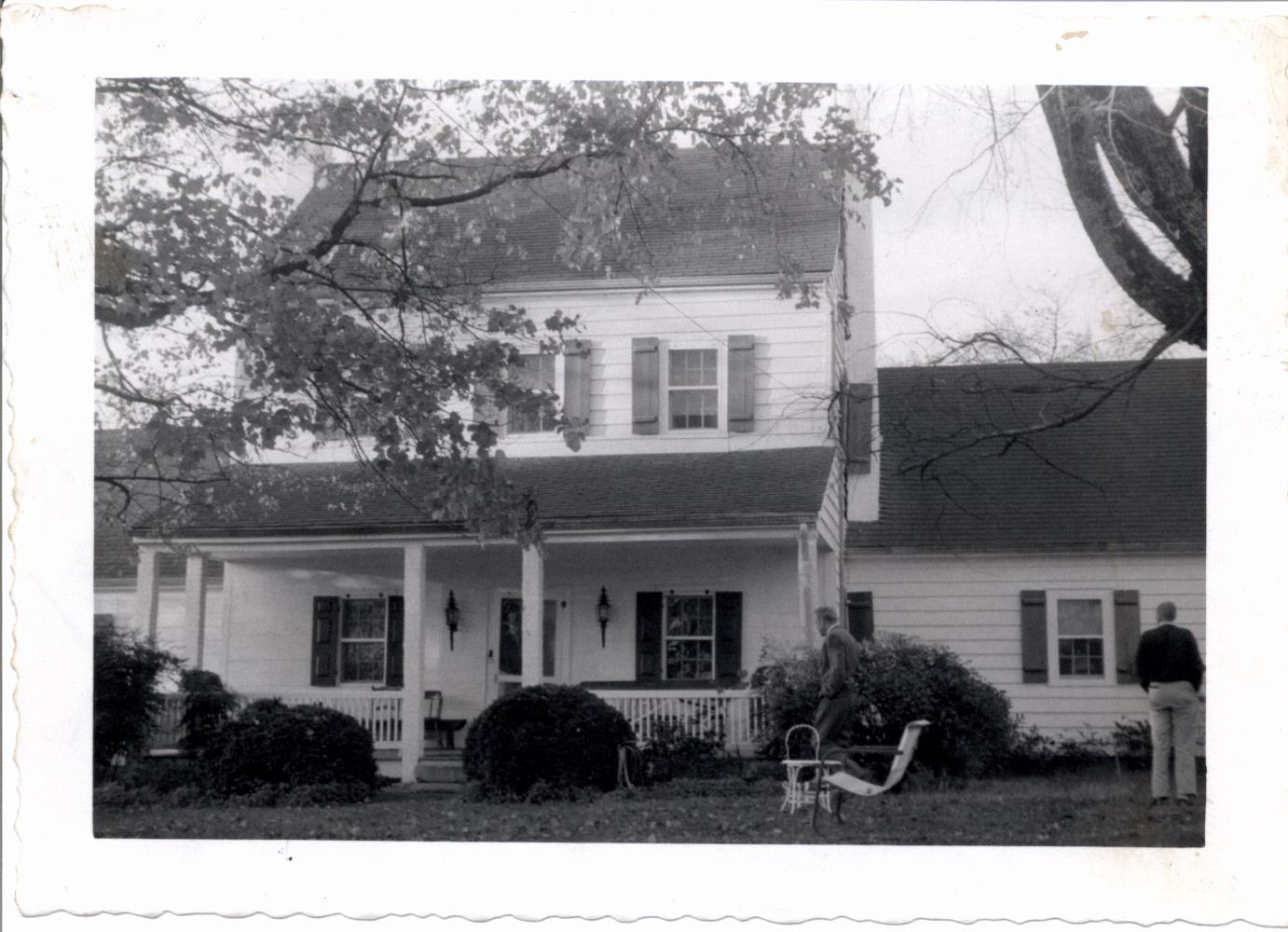

- Location within North Carolina Location within the United States
- Location: South of Davidson and southwest of Cornelius, between NC 2693 and NC 115, near Cornelius, North Carolina
- Coordinates: 35°28′45″N 80°50′13″W
- Area: 510.7 acres (206.7 ha)
- Built: 1753, 1811
- Built by: McGee, Jack
- Architectural style: Federal, Late Victorian, Colonial Revival
- MPS: Rural Mecklenburg County MPS
- NRHP reference No.: 97001561
- Added to NRHP: January 5, 1998

Potts Plantation is a historic plantation complex and national historic district located near Cornelius, Mecklenburg County, North Carolina. The district encompasses 11 contributing buildings, 12 contributing sites, and 4 contributing structures in rural Mecklenburg County. The plantation seat was built in 1811, and consists of a two-story, three-bay, weatherboarded log house on a low brick foundation with flanking one-story wings added in 1947. The house has Federal, Late Victorian, and Colonial Revival style design elements. Associated with the plantation seat are the contributing smokehouse (c. 1811 – 1820), dependency, poultry house (c. 1920 – 1940), double-pen log barn work area, and corn crib (c. 1900 – 1920). Other notable contributing resources are the Slave Cemetery, five tenant complexes, the Smith Cottage Complex (c. 1891 – 1961), Smith Cottage (c. 1891), and Potts Cemetery (1946). The Potts Plantation has been the property of the Potts family since 1753.

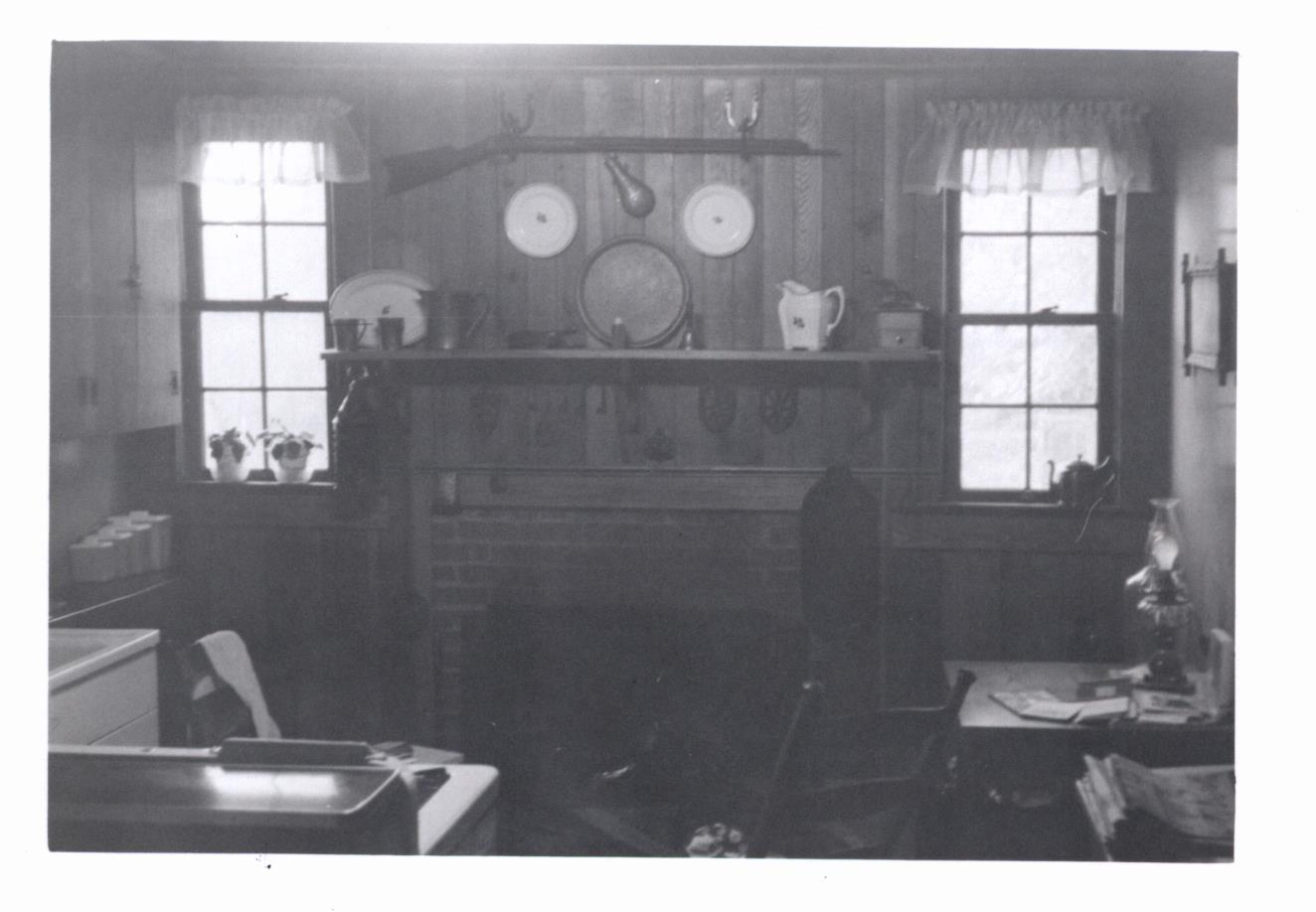
The interior of the home c. 1956.

It was listed on the National Register of Historic Places in 1998.
