= Latta Place =

Historic house in North Carolina, United States

- Latta House
- U.S. National Register of Historic Places
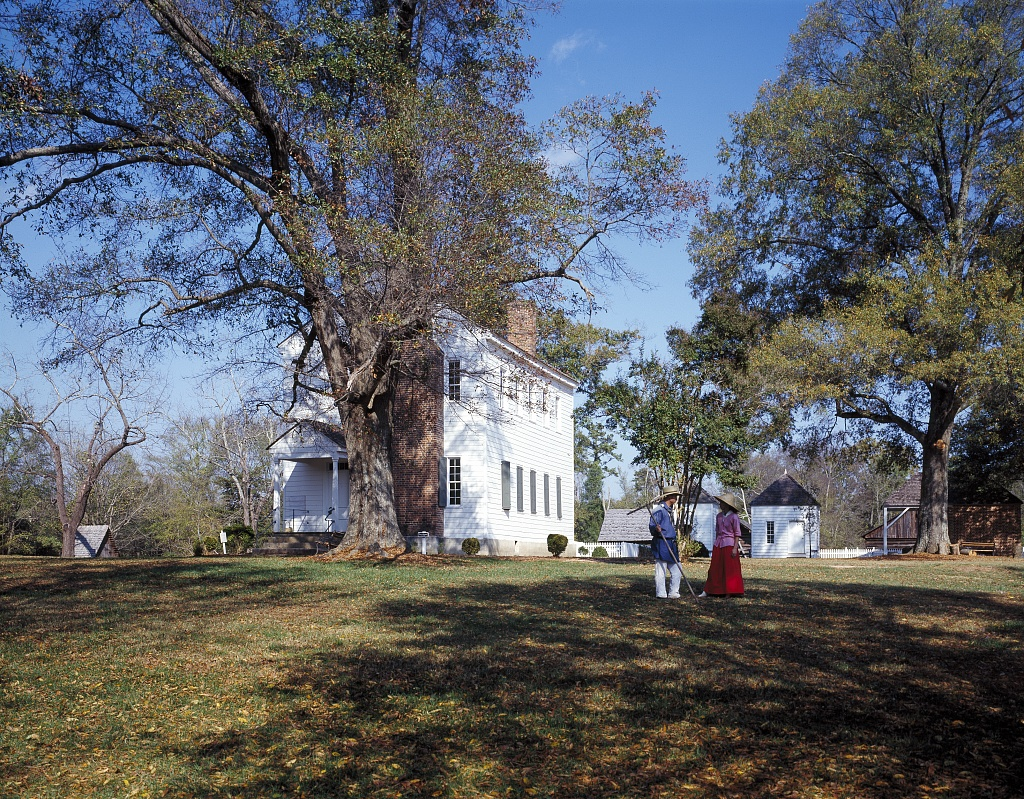

- Location within North Carolina Location within the United States
- Location: 6 miles S of Huntersville on SR 2125, near Huntersville, North Carolina
- Coordinates: 35°21′16″N 80°55′50″W
- Built: c. 1800
- Architectural style: Federal
- NRHP reference No.: 72000978
- Added to NRHP: March 16, 1972

Latta Place (formerly Latta Plantation), also known as Latta House, is a historic house located in Huntersville, North Carolina near Mountain Island Lake. Built in about 1800 in a Federal style, the plantation also contains some elements of Georgian design, including the house's main staircase.

The house and its environs are currently used as a living history exhibit and museum dedicated to exhibiting the facets of daily life in the antebellum North Carolina Piedmont. Historic Latta Plantation hosts a variety of living history events throughout the year, including battle reenactments, summer camps, and homeschool programs. The site was formerly operated by a nonprofit corporation, but the land is owned by Mecklenburg County, and maintained by the Mecklenburg County Park and Recreation department. The property also houses the Ezekiel Alexander Log Home, a log building built between 1760 and 1790, that formerly sat in nearby Charlotte.

In 2021 the Plantation was temporarily closed and an event cancelled after a controversial description of an upcoming Juneteenth event was posted online. The post was condemned by the county, town of Huntersville, and the mayor of nearby Charlotte. The post, which referred to "the massa himself" and "white refugees" that would appear in the event, was defended by the site manager Ian Campbell who is black.

Mecklenburg County staff are currently working to renovate the site before reopening it. The site's new mission and vision communicates a commitment to "Truth, Transparency, Compassion, Transformation and Unity."

It was added to the National Register of Historic Places in 1972.
