= Lake Norman Charter =

American Charter school in North Carolina

Lake Norman Charter School

Location
- 10019 Hambright Road (K–4); 12435 S. Old Statesville Road (5–8); 12701 S. Old Statesville Road (9–12); Huntersville, North Carolina 28078; United States; 35°23′N 80°51′W (Approximate)

Information
- School type: Charter
- Motto: Together we learn, lead and serve
- Established: 1998 (28 years ago)
- Superintendent: Shannon Stein
- CEEB code: 341922
- Principal: Michelle Holland (K–4th grade) Nick Carlascio (Middle school) Mark Maleck (Interim-High school)
- Grades: K-12
- Language: English (American)
- Hours in school day: 7
- Colors: Kelly Green and Royal Blue
- Athletics: NCHSAA 4A
- Athletics conference: Catawba Shores 2A/3A/4A
- Sports: Baseball, Basketball, Cheerleading, Cross Country, Football, Golf, Lacrosse, Soccer, Softball, Swim & Dive, Tennis, Track & Field, and Volleyball
- Mascot: Knight
- Yearbook: The Crusade
- Website: www.lncharter.org

Lake Norman Charter School is a public charter school in Huntersville, North Carolina. Founded in 1998, it is one of the oldest and largest charter schools in the state. The high school and middle school are on adjacent campuses near downtown Huntersville, while the elementary school is 3.2 miles away. The school has brought together a diverse variety of students who are admitted through a non-weighted lottery system.

== Overview ==
Lake Norman Charter is divided into 3 schools:

- Lake Norman Charter Elementary School (Grades K–4)
- Lake Norman Charter Middle School (Grades 5–8)
- Lake Norman Charter High School (Grades 9–12)

Lake Norman Charter has high academic standards and is primarily a college preparatory school. It is a "One-to-One" school, providing laptop computers to each high school student (iPads for middle and elementary school students) and utilizes Schoology, an online system for class submissions and grades. Lake Norman Charter offers 16 Advanced Placement courses and 82% of the students in those classes pass the AP exam. College enrollment: 96% of the Class of 2017 went on to pursue a post- secondary degree (78% in 4-year college/university, 18% in 2-year college/technical school); 9% enlisted in the military or took a gap year. 26% of the Class of 2017 attended colleges and universities outside of North Carolina.

Lake Norman Charter's (Middle School) math team regularly competes in the AMC 8 (American Mathematics Competition) and Mathcounts.

Lake Norman Charter's (High School) math team competes in the AMC 10, AMC 12, and various math meets; (Duke, WCU).

The Demographic makeup of the school is Caucasian: 63.6%, African American: 13%, Asian 10%, Multi-Racial: 6.3%, Hispanic: 6.2%, Native American: 1%, Island Pacific: <1%.

== Athletics ==
Lake Norman Charter is a member of the North Carolina High School Athletic Association (NCHSAA) and are currently classified as a 4A school. The school is a part of the Catawba Shores 2A/3A/4A Conference. The team name is the "Knights" and the school colors are kelly green and royal blue.

NCHSAA State Championships
Sport	Year(s)
Cheerleading	2017, 2018, 2019 (Medium Varsity Division 2)
Men's Cross Country	2016 (2A)
Women's Cross Country	2011 (1A), 2017 (2A)
Men's Lacrosse	2022 (3A), 2023 (3A), 2024 (3A)
Women's Soccer	2013 (1A), 2021 (2A), 2022 (3A)
Women's Tennis	2014 (2A), 2015 (2A), 2016 (2A)
