= William A. Hough High School =

American public school in North Carolina

Location
- 12420 Bailey Rd; Cornelius, North Carolina 28031; United States; 35°28′04″N 80°49′42″W

Information
- Type: Public
- Established: 2010 (16 years ago)
- School district: Charlotte-Mecklenburg Schools
- CEEB code: 340918
- Principal: David Farley
- Teaching staff: 117.95 (FTE)
- Grades: 9–12
- Enrollment: 2,503 (2023-2024)
- Student to teacher ratio: 21.22
- Campus type: Suburban
- Colors: Black, Silver, White, Blue
- Athletics: NCHSAA 8A
- Athletics conference: Greater Charlotte 7A/8A
- Sports: Baseball, Football, Ballet, Softball, Lacrosse, Tennis, Soccer, Rugby, Basketball, Swimming and Diving, Track and Field, Cross Country, Cheerleading, Wrestling, Volleyball, and Golf
- Mascot: Husky
- Nickname: Huskies
- Website: www.cmsk12.org/williamamoshoughHS

William Amos Hough High School (/hʌf/ HUF) is a high school in Cornelius, North Carolina, a northern suburb of Charlotte. The school opened in 2010. Hough's boundary includes: Cornelius, Davidson, and a section of Huntersville.

== History ==
William A. Hough High School opened in 2010. The school was constructed to relieve crowding at North Mecklenburg High School. It is named in honor of William Amos Hough Jr. (1914–1998), a lifelong educator who served as principal of North Mecklenburg High School from 1955 to 1974 and was named Principal of the Year by the North Carolina Association of Educators in 1970.

== Athletics ==
Hough's athletic teams are known as the "Huskies". The school is a member of the North Carolina High School Athletic Association (NCHSAA) and is classified as a 8A school. It is a part of the Greater Charlotte 7A/8A Conference.

NCHSAA State Championships
| Sport | Year(s) |
|---|---|
| Football | 2025 (8A) |
| Women's Soccer | 2012 (4A), 2014 (4A) |
| Women's Swimming & Diving | 2012 (4A), 2013 (4A), 2016 (4A), 2017 (4A), 2018 (4A), 2021 (4A) |
| Women's Tennis | 2020-21 (4A) |
| Wrestling Dual Team | 2020 (4A), 2026 (8A) |
| Wrestling State Tournament Team | 2020 (4A), 2026 (8A) |

== Extracurricular activities ==
The school has a National STEM league team, named "Iditarod Motorsports".

== Performing arts ==
Hough has a marching band known as the Husky Marching Band, and Hough has a competitive show choir, "Howlin' Huskies". The Huskies claimed state championships in 2017 and 2018. Hough has a dance company that claimed the title of “Small contemporary state champions” back to back in 2022 when Reagan Frey choreographed “Take me to church” and 2023 when Kaylee Yaudes choreographed “Amen”. In 2023 Hough Dance took 3rd in the state of public school dance program.

== Notable alumni ==
- Haleigh Bryant, women’s artistic gymnast, 2024 NCAA champion in the team and individual all-around and 2021 NCAA champion on vault at LSU
- Erika Connolly, American swimmer, won silver and bronze medal at the 2020 Summer Olympics and another silver medal at the 2024 Summer Olympics
- Mark Fields, former NFL cornerback, 2x CFP national champion at Clemson
- Nolan Hauser, college football kicker for the Clemson Tigers
- Ann Michael Maye, television show host and social media influencer
- Luke Maye, professional basketball player, 2017 NCAA champion at North Carolina
- Elliot Panicco, professional soccer player
- Evan Pryor, college football running back
- Ashlynn Serepca, professional soccer player
- Van Smith, American football safety, 2016 CFP national champion at Clemson
- Daniel Steedman, professional soccer player
- Nick Swiney, professional baseball player
