= Cornelius, North Carolina =

- Town
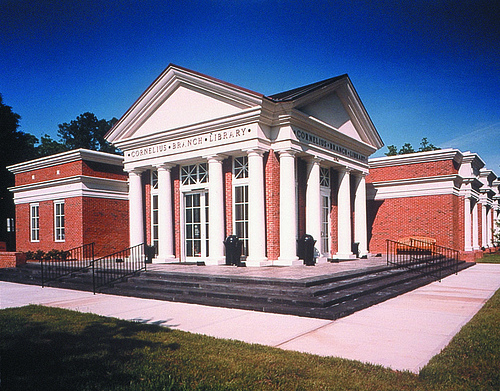
- The Cornelius branch of the Public Library of Charlotte and Mecklenburg County

- Seal
- Nickname: Corn Town
- Location in North Carolina
- Coordinates: 35°28′21″N 80°52′53″W
- Country: United States
- State: North Carolina
- County: Mecklenburg
- Founded: 1893
- Incorporated: 1905
- Named for: Joe B. Cornelius

Government
  - Mayor: Denis Bilodeau
  - Chief of Police: David Baucom

Area
  - Total: 13.12 sq mi (33.98 km^{2})
  - Land: 12.66 sq mi (32.78 km^{2})
  - Water: 0.46 sq mi (1.20 km^{2})
- Elevation: 742 ft (226 m)

Population (2020)
  - Total: 31,412
  - Density: 2,481.8/sq mi (958.23/km^{2})
- Time zone: UTC−5 (Eastern (EST))
  - Summer (DST): UTC−4 (EDT)
- ZIP Codes: 28031 (Cornelius); 28078 (Huntersville)
- Area code: 704
- FIPS code: 37-14700
- GNIS feature ID: 2406314
- Website: www.cornelius.org

Cornelius is a suburban town located along Lake Norman in northern Mecklenburg County, North Carolina, United States. It is a major suburb of Charlotte and part of its metropolitan area. The population was 31,412 at the 2020 census, up from 24,866 in 2010.

== History ==
The Cornelius area has been settled since at least the 1750s. Potts Plantation was established near Cornelius in 1753. The town of Cornelius, the second youngest of Mecklenburg County's six incorporated towns, was founded in 1893, but not incorporated until March 4, 1905. The town's origin has been traced by many historians to a dispute over cotton weighing.

Cornelius has experienced explosive growth during the 2000s, swelling from under 2,600 in the 1990 census to over 31,000 in the 2020 census. The greatest percentage growth was 364% between the 1990 and 2000 censuses, but in absolute terms the population has nearly tripled from under 12,000 in 2000 to the low to mid 30,000s today.

Potts Plantation was listed on the National Register of Historic Places in 1998.

== Geography ==
Cornelius is located along Lake Norman in northern Mecklenburg County. The town lies approximately 20 miles (30 km) north of Charlotte, at an elevation of 742 feet (226 m). It is bordered to the north and east by the town of Davidson and to the south by the town of Huntersville.

Interstate 77 crosses the middle of the town, passing west of the original town center, and with access from Exit 28, Catawba Avenue. I-77 leads south 20 miles (32 km) to Charlotte and north 22 miles (35 km) to Statesville. U.S. Route 21 runs parallel to I-77 from Catawba Avenue to the south. North Carolina Highway 115 passes through Cornelius as its Main Street, leading north 1.5 miles (2.4 km) to the center of Davidson and 8 miles (13 km) to Mooresville, and leading south 5 miles (8 km) to the center of Huntersville.

According to the U.S. Census Bureau, the town has a total area of 13.2 square miles (34 km^{2}), of which 12.7 square miles (33 km^{2}) are land and 0.5 square miles (1.3 km^{2}), or 3.53%, are water. While the western side of the town drains directly to Lake Norman, a large impoundment on the Catawba River, the eastern side drains toward the Rocky River, a southeast-flowing tributary of the Pee Dee River.

== Demographics ==
Historical population
Census	Pop.	Note	%±
1910	833		—
1920	1,141		37.0%
1930	1,230		7.8%
1940	1,195		−2.8%
1950	1,548		29.5%
1960	1,444		−6.7%
1970	1,296		−10.2%
1980	1,460		12.7%
1990	2,581		76.8%
2000	11,969		363.7%
2010	24,866		107.8%
2020	31,412		26.3%
2025 (est.)	35,094	▲	11.7%
U.S. Decennial Census

=== Racial and ethnic composition ===
Cornelius town, North Carolina – Racial and ethnic composition Note: the US Census treats Hispanic/Latino as an ethnic category. This table excludes Latinos from the racial categories and assigns them to a separate category. Hispanics/Latinos may be of any race.
Race / Ethnicity (NH = Non-Hispanic)	Pop 2000	Pop 2010	Pop 2020	% 2000	% 2010	% 2020
White alone (NH)	10,741	21,178	25,017	89.74%	85.17%	79.64%
Black or African American alone (NH)	661	1,408	1,957	5.52%	5.66%	6.23%
Native American or Alaska Native alone (NH)	24	66	42	0.20%	0.27%	0.13%
Asian alone (NH)	144	554	757	1.20%	2.23%	2.41%
Native Hawaiian or Pacific Islander alone (NH)	6	8	5	0.05%	0.03%	0.02%
Other race alone (NH)	2	21	161	0.02%	0.08%	0.51%
Mixed race or Multiracial (NH)	57	304	1,166	0.48%	1.22%	3.71%
Hispanic or Latino (any race)	334	1,327	2,307	2.79%	5.34%	7.34%
Total	11,969	24,866	31,412	100.00%	100.00%	100.00%

=== 2020 census ===
As of the 2020 census, Cornelius had a population of 31,412. The median age was 42.9 years. 21.8% of residents were under the age of 18 and 17.1% of residents were 65 years of age or older. For every 100 females there were 91.7 males, and for every 100 females age 18 and over there were 88.7 males age 18 and over.

100.0% of residents lived in urban areas, while 0.0% lived in rural areas.

There were 13,528 households in Cornelius, including 7,853 family households. Of all households, 50.5% were married-couple households, 15.7% were households with a male householder and no spouse or partner present, and 27.9% were households with a female householder and no spouse or partner present. About 29.8% of all households were made up of individuals and 10.1% had someone living alone who was 65 years of age or older. 29.5% of households had children under the age of 18 living in them.

There were 14,536 housing units, of which 6.9% were vacant. The homeowner vacancy rate was 1.1% and the rental vacancy rate was 6.1%.

=== 2000 census ===
At the 2000 census, there were 11,969 people, 5,113 households, and 3,374 families living in the town. The population density was 1,415.5 people per square mile (546.5 people/km^{2}). There were 5,716 housing units at an average density of 676.0 per square mile (261.0/km^{2}). The racial makeup of the town was 91.65% White, 5.62% African American, 0.21% Native American, 1.24% Asian, 0.05% Pacific Islander, 0.50% from other races, and 0.74% from two or more races. Hispanic or Latino people of any race were 2.79% of the population.

Of the 5,113 households 28.1% had children under the age of 18 living with them, 56.8% were married couples living together, 6.5% had a female householder with no husband present, and 34.0% were non-families. 27.0% of households were one person and 5.2% were one person aged 65 or older. The average household size was 2.34 and the average family size was 2.87.

The age distribution was 22.4% under the age of 18, 5.8% from 18 to 24, 36.7% from 25 to 44, 27.2% from 45 to 64, and 7.9% 65 or older. The median age was 37 years. For every 100 females, there were 102.9 males. For every 100 females age 18 and over, there were 101.9 males.

=== Income and poverty ===
According to Claritas Market Statistics, the median household income in 2010 was $83,789.

== Schools and libraries ==
=== School system ===
The citizens of Cornelius attend the Charlotte-Mecklenburg Schools. Elementary schools include Cornelius Elementary and JV Washam Elementary. Middle schools include Bailey Middle School. William A. Hough High School is the zoned high school. Hough opened in August 2010, and currently serves over 2,000 students.

=== Private schools ===
- Grace Covenant Academy
- New Beginnings Christian Academy
- Phoenix Montessori Academy

=== Libraries ===
Cornelius is served by a branch of the Public Library of Charlotte and Mecklenburg County. The library is located in the heart of Cornelius, on Catawba Avenue just east of exit 28 on I-77.

== Notable people ==
- Erika Brown, Olympic swimmer
- Vicky Bruce, professional women's soccer player
- Kevin Conway, professional stock car racing driver
- Amber Cope, NASCAR driver
- Jerry K. Crump, soldier in the United States Army; received Medal of Honor during the Korean War
- Blaine Donahue, professional stock car racing driver
- Christian Elder, NASCAR driver
- Mark Fields, NFL cornerback
- Erik Jones, NASCAR driver
- Michael Jordan, Hall of Fame NBA basketball player (resident)
- Steve Letarte, sportscaster and former NASCAR crew chief
- Joey Logano, NASCAR driver (resident)
- Leilani Munter, former professional race car driver and environmental activist
- Ricky Rudd, NASCAR driver
- Daniel Steedman, soccer player
- Jeff Tarte, politician
- Thom Tillis, politician and businessman
- Brian Voss, PBA and United States Bowling Congress Hall of Fame bowler
- Scot Walters, NASCAR driver
- Hoyt Wilhelm, MLB pitcher and member of the National Baseball Hall of Fame
