= Cameron Moore (musician) =

American singer-songwriter (born 1994)

- Born: 1994 (age 30–31); Charlotte, North Carolina, U.S.
- Origin: Charlotte, North Carolina, U.S.
- Genres: singer-songwriter, indie
- Occupation(s): Singer, songwriter
- Instrument(s): vocals, guitar
- Years active: 2011–present
- Labels: Independent
- Website: cameronmooremusic.com

Cameron Moore (born 1994) is an American singer-songwriter.

== Early and personal life ==
Cameron Moore was born in 1994 in Charlotte, North Carolina. He went to attend the University of North Carolina at Asheville, earning his baccalaureate in history and religious studies in 2016.

== Music career ==
His music recording career started in 2013, while his first extended play, Cameron Moore, was released on November 24, 2014.

== Discography ==
EPs

- Cameron Moore (November 24, 2014)

Studio Albums

- Alpenglow (January 26, 2018)
