= North Carolina Turnpike Authority =

Toll road authority in the United States

Agency overview
- Formed: October 3, 2002
- Jurisdiction: North Carolina
- Headquarters: 1 S Wilmington St, Raleigh, NC 27601
- Parent agency: North Carolina Department of Transportation
- Website: http://www.ncdot.gov/turnpike/

The North Carolina Turnpike Authority was created in 2002 to speed the implementation of needed transportation improvements by funding some projects with tolls. Governed by a nine-member authority board, it is located within the Department of Transportation and under the direct supervision of the Secretary of Transportation. The authority has the power to study, plan, develop and undertake preliminary design work on up to eleven turnpike projects. At the conclusion of these actives, the authority is authorized to design, establish, purchase, construct, operate and maintain toll highways and bridges. The authority is also authorized to designate one or more lanes of any highway, or portion thereof, into a high-occupancy toll lanes (HOT lanes) or other type of managed lanes; provided that such designation does not reduce the number of existing non-toll general purpose lanes.

== Structure ==
The nine-member Authority Board consist of eight appointees, from the General Assembly (four members) and Governor (four members), and the Secretary of Transportation. The General Assembly appoints four members, two by recommendation by the President pro tempore of the Senate and two by recommendation by the Speaker of the House of Representatives. Appointments to the board are four-year staggered terms. The Chair of the Authority is selected by the Authority Board. Members of the North Carolina Board of Transportation may serve as members of the Authority Board.

Upon end of term, all members of the Authority Board will remain in office until their successors are appointed and qualified. The original appointing authority may appoint a member to serve out the unexpired term of any member. Each member of the Authority Board serves at the pleasure of the appointing authority. The Chair of the Authority serves at the pleasure of the Authority Board. The appointed members of the Authority Board receives no salary for their services; however, are entitled to receive per diem and travel allowances.

An executive director, appointed by the Authority Board, serves as the Authority's chief administrative officer and is responsible for the daily administration of the toll roads and bridges constructed, maintained or operated. The Executive Director or his/her designee shall appoint, employ, dismiss and, within the limits approved by the Authority Board, fix the compensation of administrative employees as the executive director deems necessary.

== History ==
The North Carolina Turnpike Authority was established on October 3, 2002, by ratification of House Bill 644 (S.L. 2002-133) and signed by Governor Mike Easley. In its original draft, the authority was independent and only able to establish the first three projects in the following conditions: one project located in whole or in part in a county with a population equal to or greater than 650,000 persons; one project located in a county or counties that each have a population of fewer that 650,000 persons; and one project shall be a bridge of more than two miles (3.2 km) in length going from the mainland to a peninsula bordering the state of Virginia. In 2005, Senate Bill 622 (S.L. 2005-276) added new language regarding establishing tollways on Federally funded highways designated as interstates; the purpose was so that the state can possibly add tolls along Interstate 95 (I-95), if approved by the Federal Highway Administration (FHWA) and all interested parties along the route. In 2006, Senate Bill 1381 (S.L. 2006-228) focused the project to the following:

- Triangle Parkway
- Gaston East-West Connector
- Monroe Connector
- Cape Fear Skyway
- A bridge of more than two miles (3.2 km) in length going from the mainland to a peninsula bordering the state of Virginia (Mid-Currituck Bridge)
- I-540 in Wake and Durham Counties

The 2006 law also made an exception to the prohibition of converting any segment of the nontolled state highway system to toll by specifically identifying I-540 (under construction in 2006) in Wake and Durham counties and extending from I-40 southwest to North Carolina Highway 55 (NC 55). In addition, the law also mandates the North Carolina Department of Transportation (NCDOT) to maintain an existing, alternate, comparable non-toll route for each toll route constructed by the authority. In December 2006, FHWA approved the tolling project on what was going to be I-540 along the Western Wake Freeway.

In 2008, Senate Bill 1697 (S.L. 2008-225) established the enforcement of tolls on turnpike projects and clarified and revised several sections, including: removal of I-540 from project list, collection of tolls (via mail or transponder), payment system for tolls, civil penalties for not paying tolls and procedures for contesting liability for unpaid tolls. The Triangle Parkway was also renamed the Triangle Expressway, which incorporated segments also known as NC 147 (Triangle Parkway) and NC 540 (Western Wake Freeway), in Wake and Durham counties.

In 2009, House Bill 1617 (S.L. 2009-343) transferred the functions and funds of the North Carolina Turnpike Authority to NCDOT to conserve expenditures and improve efficiency. In August, the groundbreaking ceremony took place on the first phase of the Triangle Expressway. On May 4, 2010, the Authority signed a contract with TransCore to provide transponders.

In December 2011, phase one of the Triangle Expressway was open to traffic; on January 3, 2012, toll collection began. On June 26, 2012, Senate Bill 895 (S.L. 2012-85) gave the authority the ability to enter into reciprocal toll enforcement agreements with other toll agencies. In August, 2012, phase two of the Triangle Expressway was open to traffic and immediately began toll collection. In December 2012, phase three of the Triangle Expressway was opened to traffic; on January 3, 2013, toll collection began on the final section.

In 2013, House Bill 817 (S.R. 2013-183) made sweeping changes to the authority, including: removal of several turnpike projects, including the Triangle Expressway Southeast Extension, Garden Parkway, Cape Fear Skyway and the Mid-Currituck Bridge. reestablishing the turnpike project limit to nine, with the existing Triangle Expressway counting as three and the Monroe Connector/Bypass as one. New turnpike projects must follow new conditions prior to the letting of a contract for project. A limit of up to three agreements with a private entity, with an agreement of no more than 50 years from the date of the beginning of operations on the toll facility. The designation of HOT and managed lanes.

== Toll roads ==
As of 2024, the Authority operates 51.1 miles (82.2 km) of tollways in four counties in North Carolina:

- Triangle Expressway (NC 885/NC 540) — A 32.4-mile (52.1 km) controlled-access highway along the Triangle Parkway and Western and Southern Wake Freeways, in Durham and Wake counties.
- Monroe Expressway (US 74 Bypass) — A 18.7-mile (30.1 km) controlled-access highway extending from US 74, near I-485 in Stallings, to US 74, east of Wingate, in Union County.

== Managed lanes ==
Unlike the turnpike projects, the Authority is not limited to the number of managed lane projects it may construct and operate. The authority may also convert lanes that may previously have been designated as high-occupancy vehicle lane (HOV) or other type of managed lanes; provided that such designated does not reduce the number of existing non-toll general purpose lanes. In making such designations, the authority will specify the high-occupancy requirement or other conditions for use of such lanes, which may include restricting vehicle types, access controls, or the payment of tolls for vehicles that do not meet the high-occupancy requirements or conditions for use.

The authority currently has two managed lanes in North Carolina:

- I-77 Express Lanes is a public-private partnership with Cintra to build managed lanes along 25 miles (40 km) of I-77, between Brookshire Boulevard (exit 11) and NC 150 (exit 36), in Mecklenburg and Iredell counties. The $655 million project, which converted the existing HOV lanes into HOT lanes, was opened in two sections. The northern section of the I-77 Express Lanes from Hambright Road near I-485 to NC 150 opened in spring 2019. The southern section from I-277 to Hambright Road opened November 2019.
- I-485 Express Lanes are 16.62-mile (26.75 km) toll lanes along the Governor James G. Martin (southeast) segment of I-485, between U.S. Highway 74 (US 74, exit 51) and I-77/US 21 (exit 67), in Mecklenburg County. It originally cost $184.1 million in 2014, but was revised to $346 million by the time construction began in 2019. The express lanes opened on February 28, 2026.

As of 2026, one additional managed lane project was fully funded and are either scheduled or are under construction:

- Independence Express Lanes (US 74)— this project will establish managed lanes along five miles (8.0 km) of US 74, between I-277 and Wallace Lane, in Mecklenburg County. The project, which was to convert existing bus lanes, at a cost of $13 million in 2014, was expected to be completed and opened by the end of 2016. As of 2023, it is expected to cost $96 million, with construction possibly to begin in 2027.

== Turnpike projects ==
Any project proposed by the authority requires prior consultation with the Joint Legislative Commission on Governmental Operations. For a project to be considered a turnpike project, it must meet the following conditions prior to the letting of a contract for the project: 1) Two of the projects must be ranked in the top 35 based on total score on the department-produced list entitled "Mobility Fund Project Scores" dated June 6, 2012, and, in addition, may be subject to G.S. 136-18(39a). (Note: G.S. 136-18 Powers of Department of Transportation) 2) Of the projects not ranked as provided in (1), one may be subject to G.S. 136-18(39a). 3) The project shall be included in any applicable locally adopted comprehensive transportation plans. 4) The project shall be shown in the current State Transportation Improvement Program (STIP). 5) Toll projects must be approved by all affected Metropolitan Planning Organizations and Rural Transportation Planning Organizations for tolling.

== Proposed projects ==
Stipulated in the 2013 law, proposed toll road and bridges must go through same process as other transportation projects, have an STIP score and rated with other criteria contained in the Strategic Mobility Formula. Listed below are proposed projects, currently in review and subject to change:

- Cape Fear Memorial Bridge Replacement—$1.1 billion project that will replace the 1969 bridge with a new toll bridge. The Wilmington Urban Area Metropolitan Planning Organization (WMPO) approved the project in January 2024 and reaffirmed it in May 2025.
- I-40 Express Lanes (Haywood–Buncombe)—A 16-mile (26 km) express lane for east and westbound lanes of I-40/US 74 between Clyde and Asheville.
- I-485 West Express Lanes—a project, requested by Charlotte Regional Transportation Planning Organization (CRTPO), that would extend I-485 Express Lanes 10 miles (16 km) from I-77/US 21 to I-85.
- Mid-Currituck Bridge—$173 million project that will construct new 6.87 miles (11.06 km) two-lane highway and bridge over the Currituck Sound, in Currituck County.
- Triangle Expressway Eastern Extension (NC 540)—$285 million project that will construct new 10.61 miles (17.08 km) six-lane highway, between I-87/US 64/US 264 and I-40/US 70, in Johnston and Wake counties.

== Discontinued projects ==
- Cape Fear Skyway—$642 million project that would have constructed new 9.75-mile (15.69 km) four-lane highway and bridge, between US 17 and US 421, in Brunswick and New Hanover counties. In 2019, NCDOT officially discontinued the project after costs went up to nearly $1 billion and scored poorly in the STIP process.
- Garden Parkway—$318 million project that was to construct a new 21.65-mile (34.84 km) four-lane highway, between I-85 and I-485, in Gaston and Mecklenburg counties. In May 2013, the North Carolina General Assembly rescinded approval of the project. In May 2016, NCDOT made the unusual effort by sending postcards to more than 50,000 residents along the route that the Garden Parkway was officially dead.
- I-40 Express Lanes (Durham–Wake)—$1.7 billion project that would have added managed lanes along 31.73 miles (51.06 km) of I-40, between US 15/US 501 (exit 270) and I-440 (exit 301), in Durham and Wake counties. In 2014, NCDOT determined it was too costly for a statewide project at a regional level, and removed it from STIP.
- I-74 Toll—$305 million project that was to construct new 16.8 miles (27.0 km) six-lane highway, between US 52 and I-74, in Forsyth County.
- I-77 South Express Lanes—$855 million project that would have added managed lanes along 9.45 miles (15.21 km) of I-77/US 21, between I-485/Westinghouse Boulevard (exit 1) and Brookshire Boulevard (exit 11), in Mecklenburg County. On May 20, 2026, the Charlotte Regional Transportation Planning Organization (CRTPO) voted to pull support for this project; NCDOT in turn removed the project from the STIP.
- I-540 Express Lanes—$209 million or $354 million project that would have added managed lanes along 17.51 miles (28.18 km) or 24.94 miles (40.14 km) of I-540, between NC 54 and US 1 or I-87/US 64/US 264, in Durham and Wake counties.
- I-540 Toll—was a project, requested by the Capital Area MPO in 2011, that would have converted all of I-540 into a toll highway, in Durham and Wake counties, which would have also required federal approvals.

== NC Quick Pass ==
NC Quick Pass
- Industry: Electronic toll collection
- Founded: January 3, 2012; 14 years ago
- Headquarters: Raleigh, United States
- Area served: Colorado; Delaware; Florida; Georgia; Illinois; Indiana; Kansas; Kentucky; Maine; Maryland; Massachusetts; Minnesota; New Hampshire; New Jersey; New York; North Carolina; Ohio; Oklahoma; Pennsylvania; Rhode Island; Texas; Virginia; West Virginia
- Products: RFID transponders
- Website: ncquickpass.com

The NC Quick Pass is a pre-paid account used for all electronic toll collection (ETC) facilities in North Carolina. Three types of transponders are available: transponder sticker (free version), E-ZPass (hard case) transponder and E-ZPass bumper-mounted transponder. Personal (limited to five transponders/vehicles) and business accounts (unlimited) are available; a $1 fee is imposed per month if the account has been inactive for 12 months.

While NC Quick Pass users receive a discounted toll rate, non-users will be invoiced at a higher toll rate through the bill by mail program. This is done when a vehicle passes through a toll gantry, where an overhead camera will take a video image of the license plate. The registered owner of the vehicle is identified through the Division of Motor Vehicles and a bill by mail is sent for payment.

If the bill is not paid within 30 days from the date of the bill, it may escalate to include fees, civil penalties, DMV registration holds, submission to a collection agency, or all of the above.

=== Interoperability ===
NC Quick Pass is interoperable with the following ETC systems:

- Central United States Interoperability Partners—since September 2, 2026. This includes ExpressToll (Colorado), K-TAG (Kansas), Pikepass (Oklahoma), and TollTag (Texas). Within twelve months it will expand to also include EZ TAG (Texas) and TxTag (Texas).
- E-ZPass—since January 3, 2013. Until February 2024, NC Quick Pass drivers had to use the E-ZPass hard case or bumper-mounted transponders, while drivers with an E-ZPass from other states such as Virginia, etc, may simply use their E-ZPass in North Carolina. In February 2024, as a result of this technology upgrade by E-ZPass, the free NC Quick Pass sticker transponder can now be used instead.
- Florida's SunPass—since July 29, 2013.
- Georgia's Peach Pass—since November 12, 2014.

The toll collection equipment used in North Carolina, Florida, and Georgia are compatible, so that NC Quick Pass drivers may simply use any NC Quick Pass transponder in Florida and Georgia, and vice versa (SunPass and Peach Pass drivers may simply use their transponder in North Carolina).

== Criticism ==
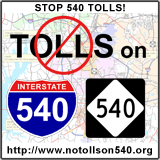
No Tolls on 540, a citizens' group opposed to tolls on I-540, was formed in March 2007

The North Carolina Turnpike Authority and North Carolina Department of Transportation received criticism following the introduction of a law allowing toll highways and bridges in the state in 2002. Introduced to speed along the implementation of transportation improvements, many of the projects selected by the Authority were controversial, leading to delays. Originally planned to be an extension of I-540, the Triangle Expressway garnered criticism from both politicians and residents for tolling the Western Wake Freeway and for the organisers being unable to sell bonds to fund the project. Following its opening, criticism shifted onto its expansion with towns raising issues about its routing and environmental concerns. Other projects, such as the Garden Parkway and Monroe Connector/Bypass prompted fear of additional urban sprawl, the criticism of politicians who had land deals along the routes, and generated lawsuits stemming from the flawed environmental studies. Both the Cape Fear Skyway and Mid-Currituck Bridge were criticized as expensive pork projects. In response to the criticism the North Carolina General Assembly removed the Garden Parkway, Cape Fear Skyway and Mid-Currituck Bridge from the authority's purview.

A more recent contract between the authority and Cintra to build I-77 HOT lanes and operate them for 50 years provoked local groups to hire legal counsel and attempt to have it nullified. Additional criticisms have stemmed from the irregular distribution of toll roads recommended by the authority throughout the state.

== See also ==
- North Carolina Ferry System
- North Carolina Highway System
