= Monroe Expressway =

Toll road in North Carolina

U.S. Highway 74 Bypass
- Monroe Expressway
- Monroe Expressway highlighted in red

Route information
- Auxiliary route of US 74
- Maintained by NCDOT
- Length: 18.679 mi (30.061 km)
- Existed: November 27, 2018–present

Major junctions
- West end: US 74 in Stallings
- US 601 in Monroe; NC 200 in Monroe
- East end: US 74 near Marshville

Location
- Country: United States
- State: North Carolina
- Counties: Union

Highway system
- United States Numbered Highway System; List; Special; Divided; North Carolina Highway System; Interstate; US; State; Scenic

The Monroe Expressway, designated U.S. Highway 74 Bypass (US 74 Byp.), is a 18.68-mile (30.06 km) controlled-access, toll road in Union County in the U.S. state of North Carolina, the first to be completed in the Charlotte area. It serves as a bypass of the communities of Indian Trail, Monroe, and Wingate for US 74, running generally parallel to the route.

== Route description ==
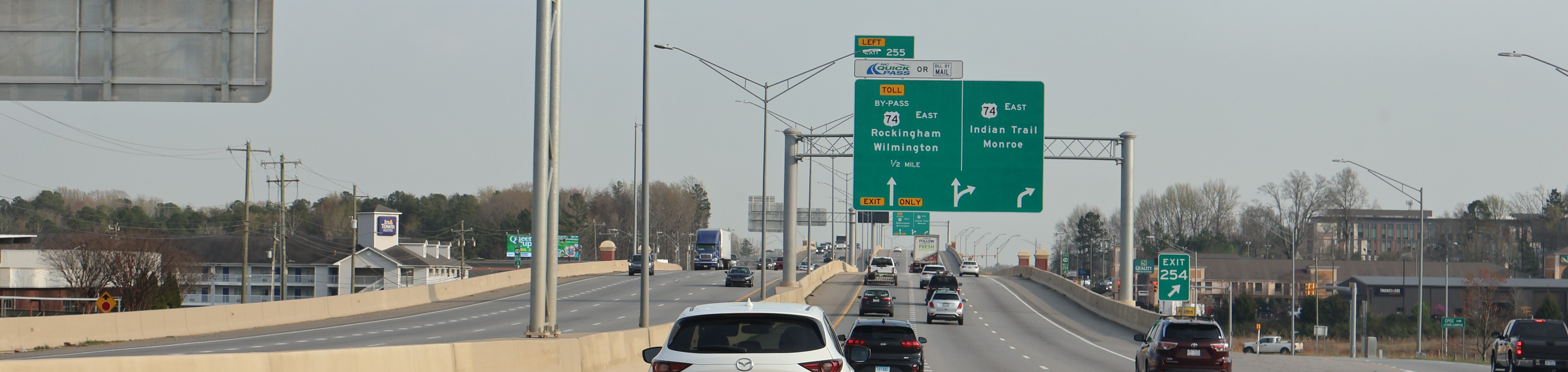
Beginning of the Monroe Expressway eastbound

Monroe Expressway at Indian Trail–Fairview Road

The Monroe Expressway begins at a partial interchange which only provides access from eastbound and to westbound US 74 as well as Stallings Road and Marie Garris Drive. It heads northeast through a mixed-use suburban area, turning to the southeast around Lake Park at a folded diamond interchange with Indian Trail Fairview Road. This interchange allows westbound Monroe Expressway traffic to indirectly access US 74 eastbound. Continuing further southeast into a rural area, the freeway runs parallel to Secrest Short Cut Road, meeting Unionville Indian Trail Road and Rocky River Road. The freeway and Secrest Short Cut Road diverge as the former meets US 601 at a partial cloverleaf interchange north of Monroe. The road then intersects North Carolina Highway 200 (NC 200) at a folded diamond interchange, turning east-southeast away from Monroe and then due east. The town of Wingate is served by an interchange with Austin Chaney Road before the Monroe Expressway turns south-southeast to its eastern terminus at another partial interchange with US 74 just west of Marshville, only allowing access to eastbound and from westbound US 74.

The entire freeway has a posted speed limit of 65 miles per hour (105 km/h), except for a reduction to 55 miles per hour (89 km/h) approaching its termini, and it has a 38-foot-wide (12 m) grass median strip.

== Tolls ==
The Monroe Expressway uses open road tolling along its entire length and is operated by the North Carolina Turnpike Authority. Electronic toll gantries are located on the expressway mainline between each interchange so that all motorists will pass through at least one. Tolls payable with a valid transponder (NC Quick Pass, E-ZPass, ExpressToll, K-TAG, Peach Pass, Pikepass, SunPass, or TollTag) or bill by mail, which uses automatic license plate recognition and charge double the posted rate with additional fees.

As of June 2026, the total toll rate for two-axle vehicles on the length of the expressway is $2.96 with valid transponder and $5.92 for bill-by-mail. Three-axle rates are twice the two-axle rates; four-or-more-axle rates are three times the two-axle rates.

== History ==
The Monroe Expressway was initially proposed as two separate projects: the Monroe Bypass and Monroe Connector. The original environmental planning process for the Monroe Bypass concluded in 1997, including a preferred alternative. The road would have begun near the intersection of US 74 and Rocky River Road, running northeast to the current location of the Monroe Expressway near Secrest Short Cut Road. From here, it would have followed the current alignment of the road to its terminus at US 74 between Wingate and Marshville. The project was divided into three sections: Section A from US 74 (western terminus) to US 601, Section B from US 601 to Richardson Creek, and Section C from Richardson Creek to US 74 (eastern terminus). After a public meeting, planning for Section A was suspended and the Monroe Connector was proposed to directly connect the bypass to I-485.

Planning for the Monroe Connector began in 1999, with a draft environmental impact statement (EIS) issued on October 17, 2003. Among the alternatives considered were simply upgrading US 74 to a freeway or building the road on a new alignment, as well as various locations to connect to I-485, including the existing interchange with US 74. In 2005, the North Carolina Turnpike Authority considered building the Connector as a toll road at the request of the Mecklenburg–Union Metropolitan Planning Organization (MUMPO). Meanwhile, NCDOT continued to develop the Monroe Bypass project separately.

With the original environmental studies for the Monroe Bypass almost 10 years old, the Federal Highway Administration required NCDOT to reevaluate the documents before starting construction. All three sections would need to be included in the reevaluation in order for the road to function as a stand-alone bypass. However, MUMPO's 2030 Long Range Transportation Plan (LRTP) omitted Section A in favor of the Monroe Connector. With inclusion in the LRTP required for FHWA approval, and the Monroe Connector and Sections B and C of the Monroe Bypass requiring the other in order to function as a single road, the reevaluation was discontinued so that the two projects could be combined. The final EIS for the combined project issued in August 2010, including the selected alternative of a controlled-access toll road. By 2015, the proposed toll road was officially renamed the Monroe Expressway.

Construction on the Monroe Expressway began in May 2015 and opened on November 27, 2018.

== Future ==
Submitted by Union County and Town of Marshville in 2021, the Charlotte Regional Transportation Planning Organization submitted a request to the North Carolina Turnpike Authority for a tolling study of the Marshville Bypass and as a possible extension of the Monroe Expressway.

== Exit list ==
The entire road is in Union County. Exit numbers and mile markers are based on US 74 mileage, but mileage listed below starts from zero. Open road tolling gantries exist between all interchanges.

| Location | mi | km | Exit | Destinations | Notes |
|---|---|---|---|---|---|
| Stallings | 0.00 | 0.00 | – | US 74 west to I-485 – Charlotte | Western terminus; access only from eastbound and to westbound US 74; eastbound Monroe Expressway signed as exit 255 from US 74 |
| Stallings | 0.85 | 1.37 | 254 | Stallings Road / Marie Garris Drive | Westbound exit and eastbound entrance |
| Indian Trail | 2.37 | 3.81 | 257 | To US 74 east – Hemby Bridge, Indian Trail | Signed only as Hemby Bridge eastbound; US 74 only signed westbound |
| Indian Trail | 4.61 | 7.42 | 259 | Lake Park | |
| Monroe | 5.99 | 9.64 | 260 | Rocky River Road | |
| Monroe | 9.94 | 16.00 | 264 | US 601 – Monroe, Concord | |
| Monroe | 11.70 | 18.83 | 266 | NC 200 (Morgan Mill Road) | |
| | 15.68 | 25.23 | 270 | Wingate / Austin Chaney Road | |
| | 18.68 | 30.06 | – | US 74 east – Rockingham, Wilmington | Eastern terminus; access only to eastbound and from westbound US 74; westbound US 74 signed exit 273 from itself |
1.000 mi = 1.609 km; 1.000 km = 0.621 mi: Incomplete access
