= Mid-Currituck Bridge =

- Coordinates: 36.33°N 75.90°W
- Crosses: Currituck Sound

History
- Opening: unknown

Location
- Interactive map of Mid-Currituck Bridge

The Mid-Currituck Bridge is a proposed 7-mile (11 km) long two-lane toll bridge that will span across Currituck Sound, connecting US 158 and NC 12. Its purpose is to alleviate summer traffic congestion and to improve both emergency response and evacuation time. Long a topic of study and debate, the bridge could be built in the 2020s-2030s.

== History ==
Plans for a bridge that connected Currituck County's mainland and outer banks has been on the drawing board since the 1970s. However, because of the high cost of project, it remained unfunded for decades. In 2008, the bridge was picked up by the North Carolina Turnpike Authority as a possible new toll route and work began on the environmental impact for the area.

On January 19, 2012, The Final Environmental Impact Statement (FEIS) was released by the N.C. Turnpike Authority. It recommended the preferred alternative for the project, which involves construction of the bridge, as well as limited improvements to existing NC 12 and US 158, estimated to cost around $660 million. With final approval expected in the spring, construction would begin in late 2012, opening to traffic in 2017.

The project would include:

- A straight two-lane bridge connecting the mainland with a northern landing on the Outer Banks;
- Toll plaza and interchange with US 158, with two-lane bridge over Maple Swamp;
- Reversing the center turn lane on US 158;
- Roundabout installed on NC 12, at the bridge landing and Currituck Clubhouse Drive; and
- Widen NC 12 to four-lane in certain areas, with left turn lanes at intersections that remain two-lane.

In June, 2012, NCDOT recommended not to fund the project through 2013, anticipating possible lawsuits. As a result, the North Carolina General Assembly provided no funds, delaying the project. In December, 2014, NCDOT included the bridge in its final draft in the 10-year State Transportation Improvement Program (STIP). With an estimated cost of $410 million, with the state contributing $173 million, it will pay off the remainder by toll revenue. Construction for the bridge was programmed to begin in 2019 and be completed in four years.

Project planning and implementation of the Mid-Currituck Bridge was placed on hold in 2013 while NCDOT reviewed state, regional and local transportation improvement funding priorities using the Strategic Mobility Formula. The project was then approved for inclusion in the 2016-2025 State Transportation Improvement Program (STIP). An amendment to the STIP called for NCDOT to start the dedication of state transportation funding in fiscal year 2017 (which starts July 2016) that will be used for bridge construction.

Reports in summer 2018 indicated that the bridge could open in 2024, but no contract for construction has yet been awarded. Officially there is no date for completion.

In March 2019 the Federal Highway Administration approved the project.

In May 2023, litigation filed by the Southern Environmental Law Center ended when the U.S. Court of Appeals for the Fourth Circuit refused to reconsider its decision that affirmed a decision by a lower court that the project could proceed. The SELC indicated that it would not pursue the case further. A timeline for the project remains unavailable, however, because the environmental studies may be too old.

In March 2026, NCDOT released a new study that the project is financially infeasible even with toll revenue.
