= Waxhaw Historic District =

Historic district in North Carolina, United States

- U.S. National Register of Historic Places
- U.S. Historic district
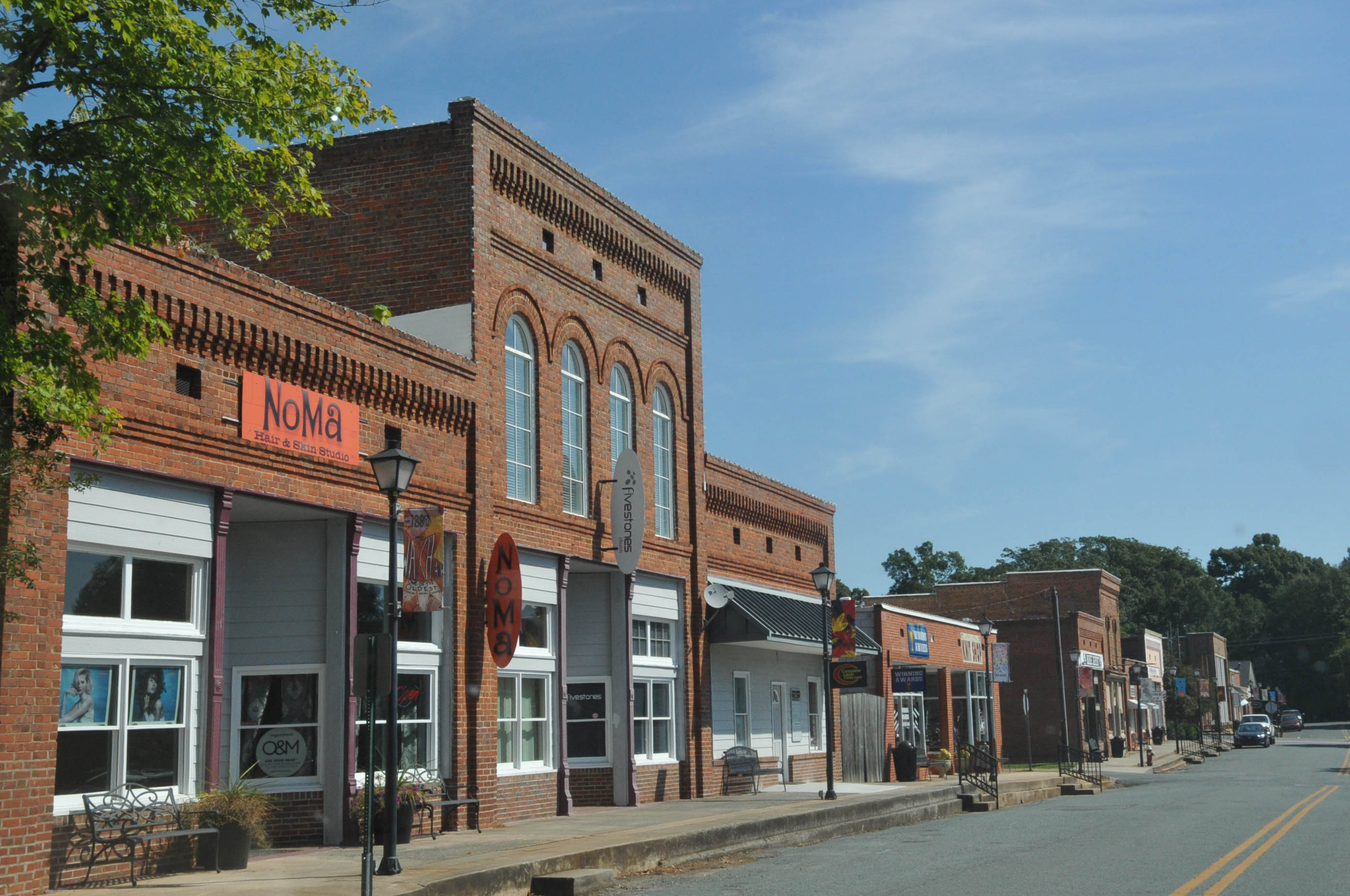
- Waxhaw Historic District, March 2007

- Location within North Carolina Location within the United States
- Location: Portions of Main, Broad, Church, Broom, Providence, Old Providence, Brevard and McKibben Sts., Waxhaw, North Carolina
- Coordinates: 34°55′25″N 80°44′39″W
- Area: 71.5 acres (28.9 ha)
- Built: 1888
- Architect: Multiple
- Architectural style: Bungalow/craftsman, Queen Anne, Commercial Style
- NRHP reference No.: 91001773
- Added to NRHP: December 6, 1991

The Waxhaw Historic District is a national historic district located at Waxhaw, Union County, North Carolina. It encompasses 93 contributing buildings, 3 contributing structures, and 1 contributing object in the central business district and surrounding residential sections of Waxhaw. The district developed between about 1888 and 1940 and includes notable examples of Commercial Style, Queen Anne, and Bungalow / American Craftsman style architecture. Notable buildings include the former Post Office (1905), Harris's store (c. 1920), Tyson Store (c. 1911), A.W. Heath Co. Mill (1905), R.J. Belk Company Store (c. 1894), A.W. Heath Company Stores (c. 1898), Weir Building (c. 1900), Plyler Building (c. 1907), Farmer's Ginning & Trading Company (c. 1915), McDonald Hotel (1912), Waxhaw Presbyterian Church (1929), Duncan McDonald House (c. 1888), and Ralph J. Belk House (c. 1885).

It was listed on the National Register of Historic Places in 1991.
