= Waxhaw, North Carolina =

- Town
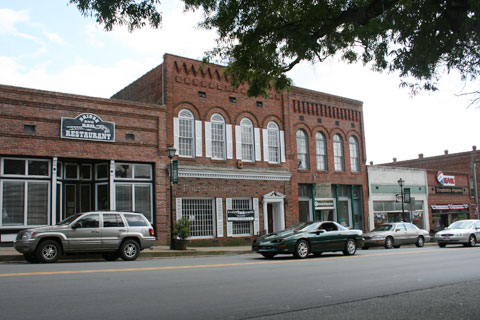
- Downtown Waxhaw
- Motto: "Proud of Our Past. Passionate About Our Future."
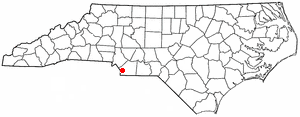
- Location of Waxhaw, North Carolina
- Coordinates: 34°56′11″N 80°44′38″W
- Country: United States
- State: North Carolina
- County: Union
- Incorporated: 1889
- Named for: Waxhaw people

Government
  - Type: council-manager
  - Mayor: Robert Murray
  - City Council: Members: Jason McCloy Hall; Brenda McMillon; Anne Simpson; Pedro Morey; Tracey Wesolek

Area
  - Total: 12.22 sq mi (31.65 km^{2})
  - Land: 12.13 sq mi (31.42 km^{2})
  - Water: 0.089 sq mi (0.23 km^{2})
- Elevation: 584 ft (178 m)

Population (2020)
  - Total: 20,534
  - Density: 1,692.8/sq mi (653.58/km^{2})
- Time zone: UTC-5 (Eastern (EST))
  - Summer (DST): UTC-4 (EDT)
- ZIP code: 28173
- Area code: 704
- FIPS code: 37-71460
- GNIS feature ID: 2406844
- Website: waxhaw.com

Waxhaw is an incorporated town in Union County, North Carolina, United States. The population was 20,534 according to the 2020 Census. The population grew 108.28% from 2010. The name is derived from the indigenous people who lived in the area, who were known as the Waxhaw people.

== Geography ==
According to the United States Census Bureau, the town has a total area of 11.54 square miles (29.9 km^{2}). Waxhaw's northernmost municipal boundary is located four and one-half miles south of the Charlotte southernmost city limit. Waxhaw is part of Union County.

Waxhaw is located in the historic region called The Waxhaws and both the region and the town are named after the indigenous Native American tribe who lived there prior to colonial settlement. Europeans sometimes referred to their settlements in the area as, The Waxhaw Settlement.

The town of Waxhaw is in the Piedmont region of North Carolina, which is a wooded area with rolling hills. This region is where gold was first discovered in the United States. The Howie Gold Mine is not far from the city limits. By 1935, 50,000 ounces of gold had been mined from this location. The Howie Gold mine operated until World War II, when most mines were shut down due to workforce changes during the war effort.

== History ==
The original inhabitants of the region were a Native American people group known alternately as either the Wysacky or the Waxhaws. The first European to record contacting the group was the Spanish conquistador Juan Pardo. In 1711, the Waxhaw aided the British colonists of North Carolina in their war against the Tuscarora, a decision that antagonized the Tuscaroras Iroquoian allies in New York, who subsequently began raiding the Waxhaw tribe. These raids continued until 1715, when the Waxhaw joined the Yamasee war effort against the British colony of South Carolina. The tribes involvement in the Yamasee War led to their destruction at the hands of South Carolina's Catawba allies and the freeing of their land for European settlement.

The area was first settled by colonists in the mid-eighteenth century. Most settlers were of German and Scots-Irish origin. Settlers became subsistence farmers and were known for being independent. Andrew Jackson, who later would become the seventh President of the United States, was born nearby in 1767, prior to the American Revolution. There is some disagreement as to which of the Carolinas was his birthplace because of the proximity of the border between the two. However, there are historical marker signs around Waxhaw, North Carolina describing Andrew Jackson's early connection to the area. His relationship to the area also is documented at the Museum of the Waxhaws. Andrew Jackson State Park is minutes from downtown Waxhaw, which has a memorial and other information about Andrew Jackson

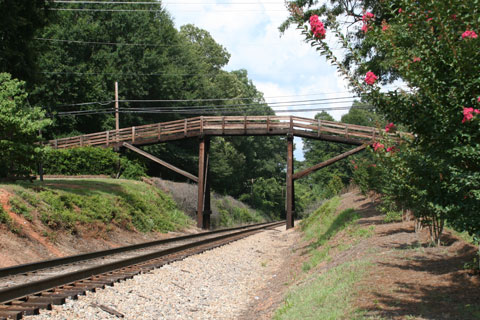
Footbridge over the railway tracks

The arrival of the railroad in 1888 created access to the markets of Atlanta and helped the town reach prosperity. The railroad tracks were laid through the center of town to show the importance of the railroad system to the community. The railroad remains in the center of town and now, is bordered by a broad landscaped area that divides the rows of stores on either side.

Beginning in the late nineteenth century, the community began to develop cotton mill factories for manufacturing textiles. The railroad helped increase access for the products of this industry. Cotton manufacturing was important to the region through the 1940s. Postwar changes in the economy, with shifts of the textile industry to jobs in other areas of the country and out of the country, required the community to adapt to new conditions.

On September 12, 2025, Waxhaw was hit by a cyberattack from unknown actors. The North Carolina Joint Cybersecurity Task Force investigated the incident.7

== Recent development ==
Waxhaw has evolved into an antique and fine dining center. Its Small Town Main Street committee is working on an integrated approach to developing and marketing the historic center of town. Waxhaw currently has dozens of specialty shops and dining restaurants. Restaurants located in town range from Mom-and-Pop restaurants to fine dining bistros.

The Waxhaw Historic District is listed on the National Register of Historic Places. It includes retail businesses as well as architecturally significant houses near the center of town. Also listed is the Pleasant Grove Camp Meeting Ground.

Residents and town officials are working on additional improvement plans. In the downtown area, there is a town park and a skate park for youths. Near the skate park is a playground and a walking area connected to downtown. New housing has been built along NC 75 to the east and west of town, as well as NC 16 (Providence Road) to the north.

Near Waxhaw is Cane Creek Park, a 1,050-acre (4.2 km^{2}) park, featuring scenic areas and recreation activities. The facility, on Harkey Road south of Waxhaw, was a cooperative venture between Union County, the Union Conservation District, and the Soil Conservation Service of the U.S. Department of Agriculture.

Currently, Waxhaw is undergoing significant suburban development and has grown by 6.4% in 2019 alone. New developments include individual residential housing, apartments, townhouses, and commercial complexes.

Waxhaw's downtown area is built to surround the train tracks that brought prosperity to the town. The tracks are abutted with green areas and parking. Guests can walk over a historic bridge to go over the train tracks, and there is a viewing area. Also a few minutes walk away, are a skateboard park and a playground. Although the train doesn't follow a public schedule, viewers try to guess the times when the train will come for viewing. Sometimes a train employee will stand on the bridge.

== Government ==
Waxhaw has a town government that was incorporated in 1889. The government is council-manager in form and it is governed by a board of commissioners that consists of six members. All members are elected to four-year terms in non-partisan elections that take place in odd-numbered years. Three commission seats are up in one cycle, then two years later the other two commission seats come up for election at the same time as that of the mayor. The town is not divided into election districts and the top vote recipients win the seats of each election. Robert Murray is the current mayor of Waxhaw.

== Demographics ==
Historical population
Census	Pop.	Note	%±
1900	752		—
1910	602		−19.9%
1920	750		24.6%
1930	840		12.0%
1940	611		−27.3%
1950	818		33.9%
1960	729		−10.9%
1970	1,248		71.2%
1980	1,208		−3.2%
1990	1,294		7.1%
2000	2,625		102.9%
2010	9,859		275.6%
2020	20,534		108.3%
2025 (est.)	23,140	▲	12.7%
U.S. Decennial Census

=== 2020 census ===
As of the 2020 census, Waxhaw had a population of 20,534. The median age was 36.4 years. 33.9% of residents were under the age of 18 and 8.6% of residents were 65 years of age or older. For every 100 females there were 93.6 males, and for every 100 females age 18 and over there were 90.2 males age 18 and over.

79.9% of residents lived in urban areas, while 20.1% lived in rural areas.

There were 6,222 households in Waxhaw, including 4,051 families. Of all households, 58.8% had children under the age of 18 living in them, 71.8% were married-couple households, 8.2% were households with a male householder and no spouse or partner present, and 16.4% were households with a female householder and no spouse or partner present. About 11.4% of all households were made up of individuals and 4.6% had someone living alone who was 65 years of age or older.

There were 6,410 housing units, of which 2.9% were vacant. The homeowner vacancy rate was 1.0% and the rental vacancy rate was 5.9%.

Waxhaw racial composition
Race	Number	Percentage
White (non-Hispanic)	14,423	70.24%
Black or African American (non-Hispanic)	1,796	8.75%
Native American	35	0.17%
Asian	1,432	6.97%
Pacific Islander	5	0.02%
Other/Mixed	1,029	5.01%
Hispanic or Latino	1,814	8.83%

=== Income and poverty ===
The median household income was $116,964, which is more than double the North Carolina median income of $56,642.

=== 2010 census ===
As of the census of 2010, there were 9,859 people, 3,242 households, and 2,626 families residing in the town. For the population density, there were 854.0 people per square mile (329.95/km^{2}) and 3,517 housing units. As for the racial makeup of the town, there were 78.1% White, 11.00% African American, 2.1% from two or more races, 2.0% Asian, and 0.04% Native American. The Hispanic or Latino of any race was 6.4% of the population.

There were 3,242 households, out of which 41.8% had children under the age of eighteen living with them, 81.0% were married couples living together, 10.5% had a female householder with no spouse present, and 19.0% were non-families. The average household size was 3.04 and the average family size was 3.41.

In the town, the population age range was from 34.6% under the age of 18, 3.1% from 20 to 24, 32.3% from 25 to 44, 21.2% from 45 to 64, and 7% who were 65 years of age or older. The median age was 34.5 years. For every 100 females there were 93.6 males. For every 100 females age 18 and over, there were 88.8 males.

The median income for a household in the town was $73,188. The per capita income for the town was $27,949. The percentage of people below the poverty line was 8.9%.

== Local schools ==
=== Public elementary schools ===
- Kensington Elementary School
- Sandy Ridge Elementary School
- Waxhaw Elementary School
- Western Union Elementary School
- New Town Elementary School
- Rea View Elementary School
- Marvin Elementary School
- Prospect Elementary School

=== Public middle schools ===
- Marvin Ridge Middle School
- Parkwood Middle school
- Cuthbertson Middle School

=== Public high schools ===
- Marvin Ridge High School
- South Providence High School
- Parkwood High School
- Cuthbertson High School
- Central Academy of Technology and Arts (CATA)

=== Private schools ===
- Arborbrook Christian Academy
- Omni Montessori School
- Metrolina Christian Academy
- North Point Christian Academy

=== Charter schools ===
- Union Day Charter School
- Union Academy
- Apprentice Academy of North Carolina

== Library ==
The Waxhaw branch of the Union County Public Library system was founded in 1937 with the support of the Waxhaw Womens Club and the federal Works Progress Administration (WPA). The original Waxhaw Library located at 509 South Providence Street was permanently closed on March 18, 2024, to prepare for the new South West Regional Library which opened on April 19, 2024 at 1515 Cuthbertson Road.
