= Cape Fear Skyway =

Proposed road and bridge in North Carolina, US

- Coordinates: 34.17°N 77.95°W
- Crosses: Cape Fear River

The Cape Fear Skyway (also called the Cape Fear Crossing) was a proposed limited access toll road and bridge in North Carolina, United States, that would pass through portions of New Hanover and Brunswick counties.

== Description ==
The proposed 9.5-mile (15.3 km) route would connect the south-end of Wilmington to Brunswick County, by crossing over the Cape Fear River. The proposed clearance is 225 ft (68.5 m) to allow large tankers or cruise ships to pass underneath and it would likely be a cable-stayed bridge. It is proposed to support a maximum of 6 lanes across. The road extension will begin at Independence Blvd and extend to the proposed southern extension of Interstate 140. The project was projected to cost between $555 million and $1.18 billion and was originally proposed to begin after 2015.

In May 2013, the North Carolina General Assembly rescinded the project's authorization. However, in 2016 NCDOT stated that planning and environmental studies were funded in the 2016–2025 State Transportation Improvement Plan. A similar project of undetermined timing remains under discussion in Wilmington, but NCDOT says construction would not start before 2029. In August 2019, NCDOT halted design and planning of the bridge, putting the project on hold indefinitely.
