= Stallings, North Carolina =

- Town
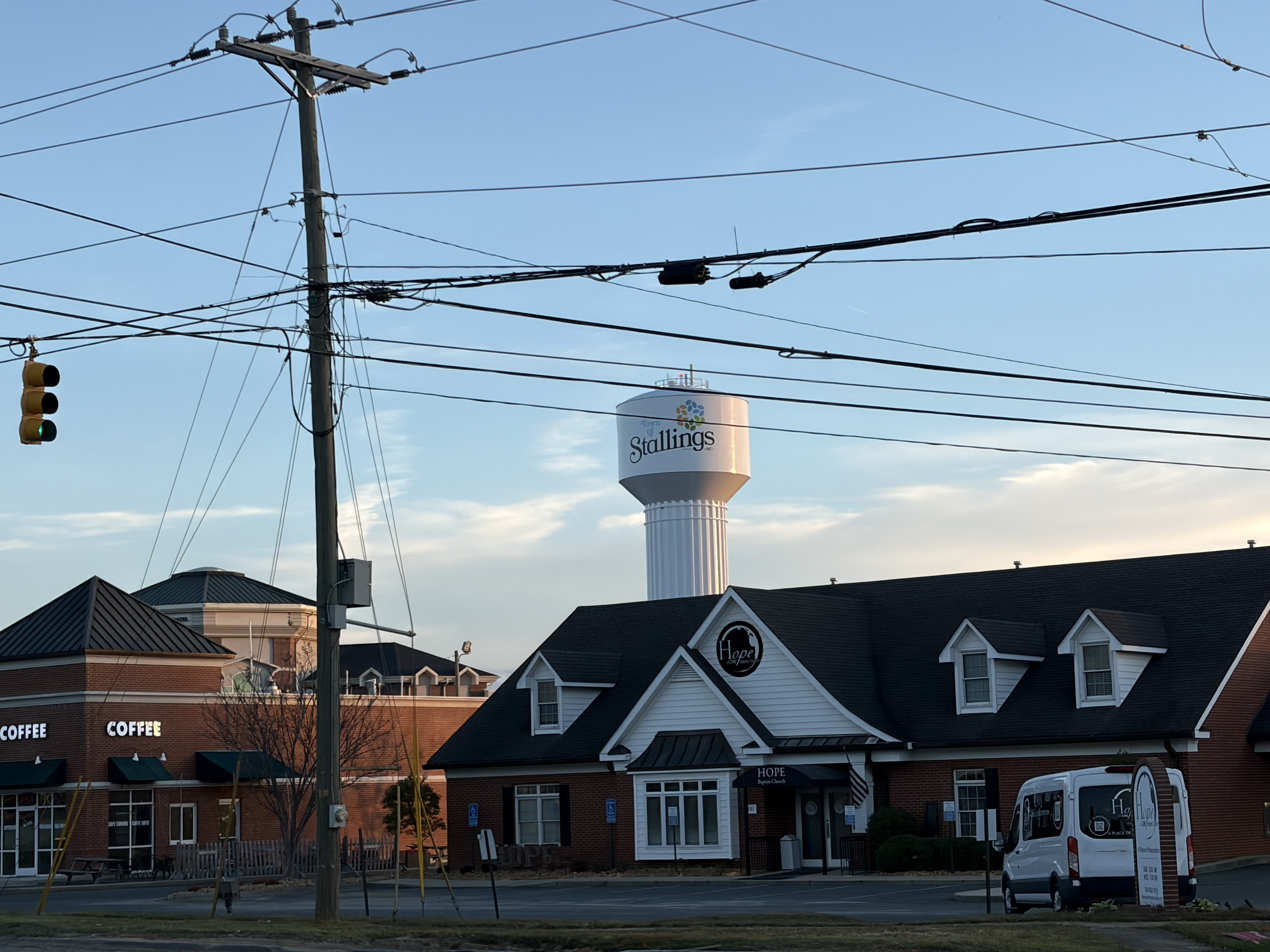
- Buildings and a water tower in Stallings

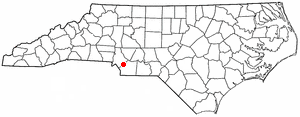
- Location in North Carolina
- Coordinates: 35°07′28″N 80°36′50″W
- Country: United States
- State: North Carolina
- Counties: Union, Mecklenburg
- Incorporated: June 24, 1975
- Named for: The Stallings family

Government
  - Mayor: David Scholl

Area
  - Total: 8.51 sq mi (22.0 km^{2})
  - Land: 8.45 sq mi (21.9 km^{2})
  - Water: 0.07 sq mi (0.18 km^{2})
- Elevation: 676 ft (206 m)

Population (2020)
  - Total: 16,112
  - Density: 1,907.6/sq mi (736.5/km^{2})
- Time zone: UTC−5 (Eastern (EST))
  - Summer (DST): UTC−4 (EDT)
- ZIP Codes: 28104 (Stallings); 28105 (Matthews); 28079 (Indian Trail)
- Area code: 704
- FIPS code: 37-64420
- GNIS feature ID: 2407395
- Website: www.stallingsnc.org

Stallings is a suburban town in Union and Mecklenburg counties in the U.S. state of North Carolina. The population was 16,112 at the 2020 census, up from 13,831 in 2010.

== History ==
Stallings was incorporated as a town in 1975, but its history dates back to the early 1900s when Matthew Thomas Stallings, a prominent farmer and merchant who lived near Harrisburg, moved to Union County and bought 200 acres (81 ha) of land on the Mecklenburg County line - northwest of Indian Trail. The late Mr. Jim Smith once described the land as "all in timber, the finest timber you've ever seen." Mr. Stallings built a home and opened a country store near the Seaboard Railway track. Newspaper articles from that time note that Mr. Stallings "began to improve his holdings with a view to building up an important settlement and encouraging enterprise and industry in his vicinity."

Mark Conder opened a sawmill, giving Stallings its first industry. Approximately a year later, M. T. Stallings' brother, Martin Stallings, also moved from Cabarrus County and bought another tract of land for farming; the community became known as "Stallings". Martin Stallings was the father of Carl "Tip" Stallings, who became the first mayor of the town after its incorporation. Many people were employed with the saw mill, the store and engaged in farming. The lumber was shipped by rail on to Charlotte and other destinations. An undated article by L. W. Harkey states: "Every year after crops were laid by, Mr. Stallings would have a regular picnic long about August. And have foot races, sack races, egg races, and all kinds of games. Lemonade and cold drinks were set out under the big oak tree back of the store."

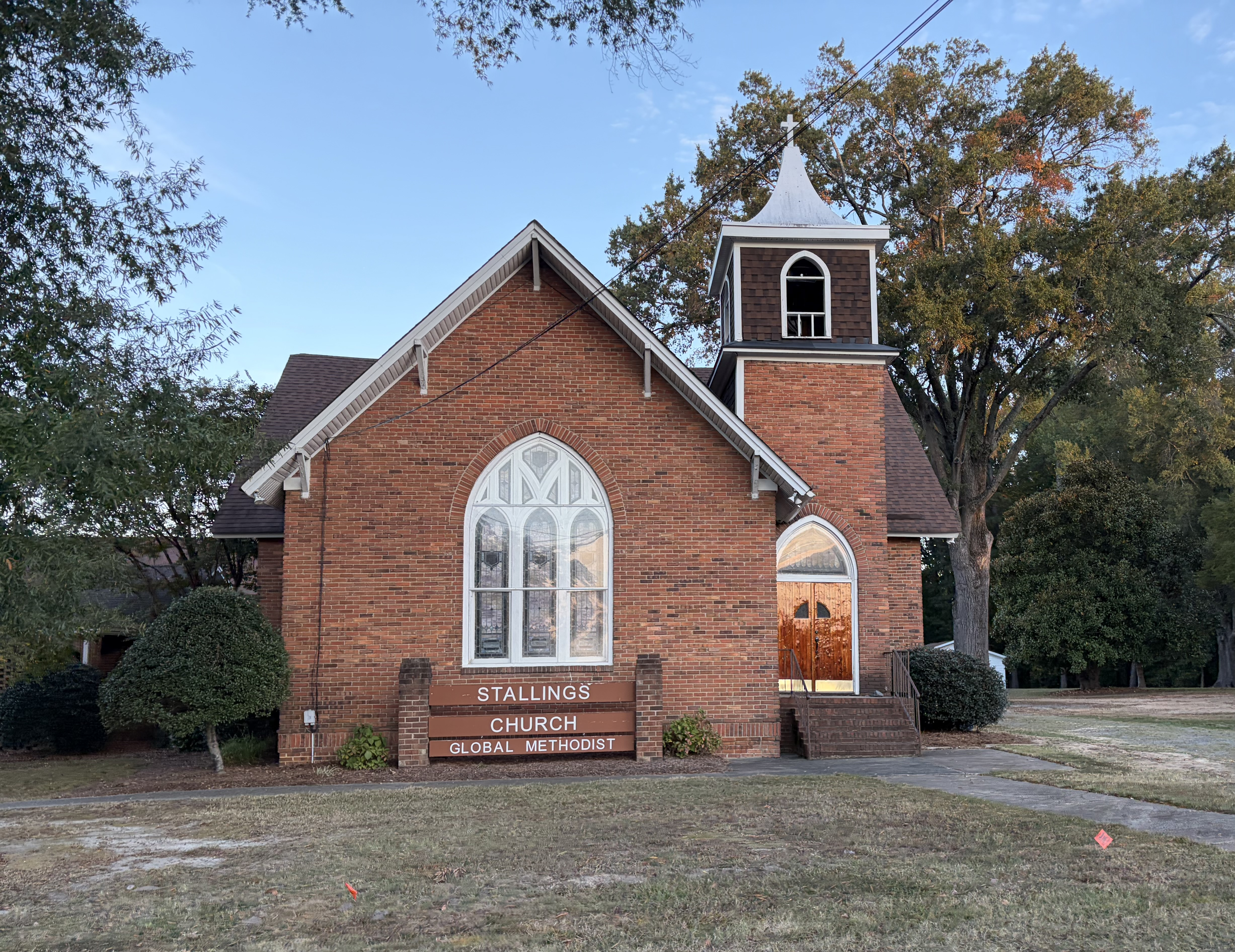
Stallings Church, a Global Methodist church.

A 1912 newspaper article stated: "there was a good school in operation with about 75 pupils enrolled and some twenty families settled on the original purchase. The Seaboard Air Line has a regular station there, named Stallings, and all prospects bid fair to make this locality of much future importance. Mr. Stallings will be glad to offer special inducements to manufacturers or others desiring sites for plants or permanent homes." A few years later, a new store was built across the road, and the old store building was used for a Methodist church and a schoolhouse. The one-room schoolhouse was located where a large industry, AEP, is now located. Stallings Methodist Church was started circa 1911, largely through the efforts of P. D. and Margaret Drye, with the first pastor being Rev. L. W. Self. A new Methodist church was built in 1912, and the old building was torn down. In 1919, the church was struck by lightning and burned. A bucket brigade was formed, but the building could not be saved. The church was immediately rebuilt, and that building remains today. The store business changed ownership at least four times over the next fifty years. It burned to the ground once and was rebuilt. It was always known as the Country Store, furnishing the community with groceries, feed, and notions during the day, and serving as a gathering place in the evenings. Mr. Jim Smith owned and operated the store from 1916 until 1948. "Mr. Jim" was also one of the largest farmers in the area, and his farm still exists today as Smith Brothers Farm. The store was finally torn down and a strip of small businesses built in its place.

From the turn of the century until the Great Depression of the 1930s, Indian Trail and Stallings were trading centers for cotton farmers as far away as Wesley Chapel to the south and Stewart's Mill to the north. A community resident, Bob Noles, once wrote about Mr. Jim Smith's store, stating it was "nothing to have 50 bales of cotton on the store yard".

In 1910, the Seaboard Railway built a depot and furnished passenger service, as well as freight service, for several years. The depot gave the town's residents and merchants easy access to suppliers. With the Depression, however, the trains stopped running and the depots in Stallings and Indian Trail were both closed. The depot in Stallings had closed earlier because the train could not get up steam fast enough to climb the grade into Matthews, if it stopped in Stallings.

"Mr. Jim" was quoted in a 1975 article saying, "Years ago there wasn't nothing to get money out of but cotton and watermelons." The giant Bradford watermelons grew well in the sandy soil and were sold in Charlotte by the truckloads or shipped to New York by rail. When the Depression came, blight killed the watermelons, boll weevils feasted on the cotton, and the Depression made peasants of everyone.

After the Depression, a new four-lane highway, U.S. 74, was built and passed through Stallings from Monroe to Charlotte. Growth and population grew quickly in the 1960s and early 1970s. The town was incorporated on June 24, 1975.

Stallings, then classified as a small town, had a population of 2,152 and more than 200 businesses. A new shopping center was built featuring a Winn-Dixie supermarket and Kerr Drug, along with several other businesses. It appeared that Mr. M. T. Stallings' 1912 prediction that "all prospects bid fair to make this locality of much future importance" was accurate.

The town of Stallings continued to grow; by 2003, there were over 8,500 residents and 400 businesses. A large annexation along Stevens Mill Road and Lawyers Road in 2001 doubled the population and size of the town almost overnight. Additional annexations included parcels of land in adjoining Mecklenburg County, making Stallings the first Union County town to lie in two counties. The 2001 annexation included land along Goose Creek. Goose Creek begins along the northeastern boundary of current Mecklenburg County and flows southeasterly to the Rocky River. Near the headwaters of this creek is an area of town referred to as the "Stevens Mill area". It is located along Stevens Mill Road between Idlewild Road and Lawyers Road.

=== Stevens Mill ===
The history of the Stevens Mill area goes back to the establishment of a gristmill in the late 1700s. The mill was built and known as Blair's Mill for many years before it became Stevens Mill. The site of the mill also contained a handsome old antebellum home of the Stevens family. The home was destroyed by fire in December 1894.

A history compiled by Houston V. Blair of Monroe, North Carolina, states: "The 'mill site' is known to have existed as early as December 1789 and was built as a grist mill by William Blair on approximately 1400 acres. When William Blair died Samuel Blair operated the mill along with his son James G. Blair until his death in 1836. The last mill at this site was constructed in 1826 on a massive stone foundation along Goose Creek, remnants of which still exist. Craftsmen who had just completed Philadelphia Presbyterian Church in Mint Hill, built Blair's Mill, as it was called then, as a four-story wooden structure. The water wheel that gave power to the mill was said to be some thirty feet in diameter. On February 3, 1849 James G. Blair sold Blair's Mill and 610 acres of land on the waters of Goose Creek to Amos Stevens. Thus, beginning in 1849 and in future generations Blair's Mill became known as Stevens Mill. The Stevens family operated the mill for almost 100 years thereafter."

Rev. S. Hood wrote an article appearing in the Charlotte News in the early 1900s. It quoted Dr. Sam Stevens describing the four- story wooden structure as one of immense hewed logs mortised and keyed with pins and built in 1826. The mill contained equipment for both flour and meal and was kept in good condition. Rev. Hood continued in his article to describe the mill in its earlier days: "Even in colonial days the scene, near the old stage coach line, must have been a community gathering place, or mustering ground for the local militia and perhaps was the scene of a large country store and water mill long before the present old building was erected.

Newton Pyron, a local resident, recounts how he "attended the exhibition of John Robinson's shows on the yard of this old mill soon after the Civil War and got a free ticket 50 years later when the show came back to Charlotte." The John Robinson's shows were later acquired by, and are now known as, the Ringling Brothers Barnum & Bailey Circus.

The water-ground products from the mill were known throughout Union and Mecklenburg counties. Rev. Hood stated that it "was preferred and demanded by discriminating housewives in Charlotte and Monroe. For many generations farmers from miles around found their way to the Steven's water mill with their corn and wheat on men's backs, on mules, on ox carts, sleds, and later by motor vehicle."

Although the small piece of land that contains the ruins of the mill is now part of the town of Mint Hill, most of the land that was once part of the mill property is now in the town of Stallings. Stevens Creek, which fed the mill, still runs out of Mecklenburg County under Interstate 485 and through the Divide Golf Course. A major street, a neighborhood, and a shopping center have been named for the mill that once contributed greatly to the area.

Stallings has grown from a small town with only one municipal employee to a town of 16,112 residents and the third largest municipality in Union County. For many years, the town continued the tradition of Mr. Stallings' picnic "long about August" by hosting a family event in the park event on the first weekend of August, but more recently the event has moved to September. Other events to bring the community together include an Easter egg hunt, Earth Day celebrations, a music festival, and a Christmas tree lighting.

== Geography ==
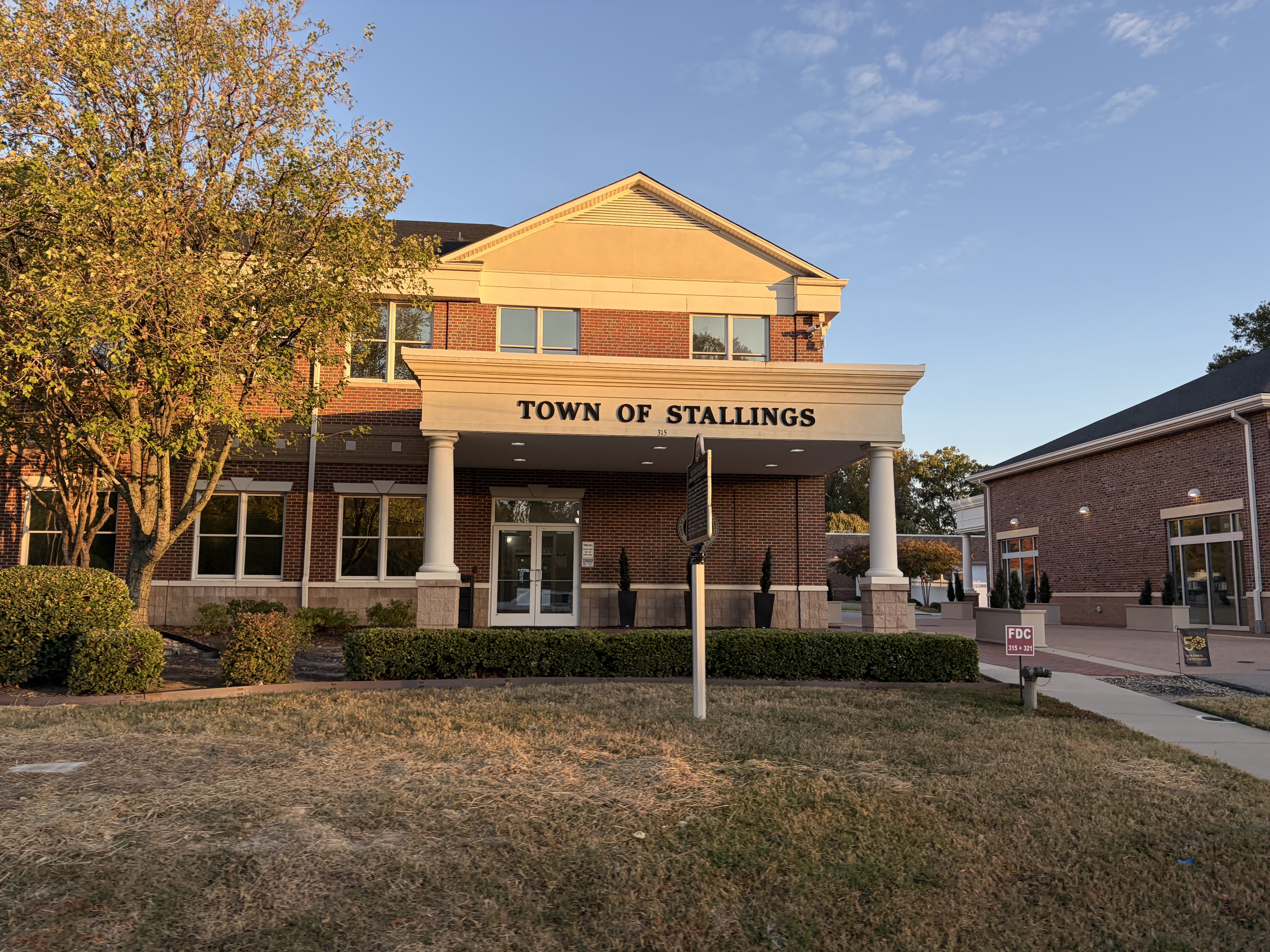
Stallings Town Hall

Stallings is in northwestern Union County, with a few small portions extending into Mecklenburg County to the northwest. It is bordered to the northwest by the town of Matthews and to the southeast by the towns of Indian Trail and Hemby Bridge. The city of Charlotte borders the southwestern end of the town, and the town of Mint Hill is close to the northwest.

U.S. Route 74 crosses Stallings to the northeast of the original town center, leading northwest 13 miles (21 km) to Uptown Charlotte and southeast 11 miles (18 km) to Monroe. Interstate 485, the Charlotte Outerbelt, passes through Matthews just northwest of the Stallings border.

According to the U.S. Census Bureau, the town of Stallings has a total area of 8.5 square miles (22.0 km^{2}), of which 0.065 square miles (0.168 km^{2}), or 0.76%, are water. Most of the town drains to the east into tributaries of Crooked Creek, part of the Rocky River watershed leading to the Pee Dee River. The southwest end of the town drains south toward Twelvemile Creek, a tributary of the Catawba River.

== Demographics ==
Historical population
Census	Pop.	Note	%±
1980	1,826		—
1990	2,132		16.8%
2000	3,189		49.6%
2010	13,831		333.7%
2020	16,112		16.5%
2025 (est.)	17,760	▲	10.2%
U.S. Decennial Census

=== 2020 census ===
Stallings racial composition
Race	Number	Percentage
White (non-Hispanic)	11,714	72.7%
Black or African American (non-Hispanic)	1,284	7.97%
Native American	51	0.32%
Asian	1,031	6.4%
Pacific Islander	1	0.01%
Other/Mixed	769	4.77%
Hispanic or Latino	1,262	7.83%

As of the 2020 census, Stallings had a population of 16,112. The median age was 40.9 years. 24.0% of residents were under the age of 18 and 16.0% of residents were 65 years of age or older. For every 100 females there were 93.5 males, and for every 100 females age 18 and over there were 90.2 males age 18 and over.

100.0% of residents lived in urban areas, while 0.0% lived in rural areas.

There were 5,968 households in Stallings, including 4,283 family households, and 36.3% had children under the age of 18 living in them. Of all households, 63.8% were married-couple households, 10.7% were households with a male householder and no spouse or partner present, and 21.6% were households with a female householder and no spouse or partner present. About 18.6% of all households were made up of individuals and 8.0% had someone living alone who was 65 years of age or older.

There were 6,122 housing units, of which 2.5% were vacant. The homeowner vacancy rate was 0.8% and the rental vacancy rate was 5.4%.

=== 2000 census ===
As of the census of 2000, there were 3,189 people, 1,180 households, and 931 families residing in the town. The population density was 904.6 inhabitants per square mile (349.3/km^{2}). There were 1,222 housing units at an average density of 346.7 per square mile (133.9/km^{2}). The racial makeup of the town was 88.46% White, 7.78% African American, 0.78% Native American, 0.34% Asian, 1.76% from other races, and 0.88% from two or more races. Hispanic or Latino of any race were 3.67% of the population.

There were 1,180 households, out of which 36.9% had children under the age of 18 living with them, 64.2% were married couples living together, 10.5% had a female householder with no husband present, and 21.1% were non-families. 16.6% of all households were made up of individuals, and 5.3% had someone living alone who was 65 years of age or older. The average household size was 2.70 and the average family size was 3.03.

In the town, the population was spread out, with 26.7% under the age of 18, 6.4% from 18 to 24, 37.5% from 25 to 44, 20.9% from 45 to 64, and 8.5% who were 65 years of age or older. The median age was 34 years. For every 100 females, there were 96.6 males. For every 100 females age 18 and over, there were 94.3 males.

The median income for a household in the town was $51,419, and the median income for a family was $54,526. Males had a median income of $40,149 versus $26,467 for females. The per capita income for the town was $22,352. About 4.9% of families and 5.0% of the population were below the poverty line, including 2.7% of those under age 18 and 11.9% of those age 65 or over.
