= List of schools accredited by the Association of Theological Schools in the United States and Canada =

This is a list of the graduate schools of theology accredited by the Commission on Accrediting of the Association of Theological Schools in the United States and Canada.

== Institutes accredited ==
Name of institution	City and state or province	Head of school (and title)	Accredited by ATS since	Primary denominational affiliation
Abilene Christian University, Graduate School of Theology	Abilene, Texas	Carson Reed (Dean)	2002	Churches of Christ
Academy for Jewish Religion	Yonkers, New York	Ora Horn Prouser (CEO and Academic Dean)	2020	Jewish
Acadia Divinity College	Wolfville, Nova Scotia	Anna Robbins (President and Dean of Theology)	1984	Convention of Atlantic Baptist Churches
Ambrose Seminary	Calgary, Alberta	Pamela Nordstrom (Provost)	1989	Christian and Missionary Alliance
America Evangelical University Seminary	Gardena, California	Sanghoon Lee (President)	2023	Korean Evangelical Holiness Church
Anabaptist Mennonite Biblical Seminary	Elkhart, Indiana	Sara Wenger Shenk (President)	1958	Mennonite Church USA
Anderson University School of Theology	Anderson, Indiana	James L. Edwards (President)	1965	Church of God (Anderson, Indiana)
Antiochian House of Studies	La Verne, California	Michel Najim (President)	2022	Antiochian Orthodox Christian Archdiocese of North America
Aquinas Institute of Theology	St. Louis, Missouri	Richard Peddicord (President)	1968	Roman Catholic
Asbury Theological Seminary	Wilmore, Kentucky	Timothy C. Tennent (President)	1938	Inter/Multidenominational
Ashland Theological Seminary	Ashland, Ohio	John C. Shultz (President)	1969	Brethren Church (Ashland, Ohio)
Assemblies of God Theological Seminary	Springfield, Missouri	Mark A. Hausfeld (President)	1992	Assemblies of God
Associated Canadian Theological Schools (ACTS) of Trinity Western University	Langley, British Columbia	Kenneth G. Radant (Principal and Academic Dean)	1997	Inter/Multidenominational
Athenaeum of Ohio	Cincinnati, Ohio	Benedict D. O'Cinnsealaigh (President and Rector)	1972	Roman Catholic
Atlantic School of Theology	Halifax, Nova Scotia	Eric Beresford (President)	1976	Inter/Multidenominational
Augustine Institute	Florissant, Missouri	Timothy C. Gray (President)	2016	Roman Catholic
Austin Presbyterian Theological Seminary	Austin, Texas	Theodore J. Wardlaw (President)	1938	Presbyterian Church (U.S.A.)
Azusa Pacific Graduate School of Theology	Azusa, California	T. Scott Daniels (Dean of the School of Theology)	1990	Wesleyan Church
B. H. Carroll Theological Institute	Irving, Texas	Gene Wilkes (President)	2017	Baptist
Baptist Missionary Association Theological Seminary	Jacksonville, Texas	Charley Holmes (President)	2008	Baptist Missionary Association of America
Barry University, Department of Theology and Philosophy	Miami Shores, Florida	Mark E. Wedig (Chair and Associate Dean)	2004	Roman Catholic
Beeson Divinity School of Samford University	Birmingham, Alabama	Timothy George (Dean)	1996	Inter/Multidenominational
Berkeley Divinity School	New Haven, Connecticut	Joseph H. Britton (President and Dean)	1938	Episcopal Church
Bethany Theological Seminary	Richmond, Indiana	Ruthann Knechel Johansen (President)	1940	Church of the Brethren
Bethel Seminary of Bethel University	St. Paul, Minnesota	James H. Barnes (President)	1966	Baptist General Conference
Bexley Hall Seabury-Western Theological Seminary Federation	Chicago, Illinois	Roger Ferlo (President)	1952	Episcopal Church
Boston College School of Theology and Ministry	Chestnut Hill, Massachusetts	Mark S. Massa (Dean)	1968	Roman Catholic
Boston University School of Theology	Boston, Massachusetts	Mary Elizabeth Moore (Dean)	1938	United Methodist Church
Briercrest College and Seminary	Caronport, Saskatchewan	Dwayne Uglem (President)	1998	Inter/Multidenominational
Brite Divinity School at Texas Christian University	Fort Worth, Texas	D. Newell Williams (President)	1940	Christian Church (Disciples of Christ)
Byzantine Catholic Seminary of SS. Cyril and Methodius	Pittsburgh, Pennsylvania	Robert Pipta (Rector)	2008	Byzantine Catholic Archeparchy of Pittsburgh
Calvin Theological Seminary	Grand Rapids, Michigan	Julius T. Medenblik (President)	1944	Christian Reformed Church
Campbell University Divinity School	Buies Creek, North Carolina	Andrew H. Wakefield (Dean)	2002	Cooperative Baptist Fellowship
Canadian Reformed Theological Seminary	Hamilton, Ontario	Bryan Vanderhorst (President)	2013	Canadian Reformed Church
Canadian Baptist Theological Seminary and College	Cochrane, Alberta	Robert Blackaby (President)	2001	Canadian National Baptist Convention
Candler School of Theology of Emory University	Atlanta, Georgia	Jan Love (Dean)	1938	United Methodist Church
Carey Theological College	Vancouver, British Columbia	Colin R. Godwin (President)	2013	Canadian Baptist of Western Canada
Catholic Theological Union	Chicago, Illinois	Enzo Del Broncco, CP (President)	1968	Roman Catholic
Catholic University of America School of Theology and Religious Studies	Washington, DC	John H. Garvey (President)	1980	Roman Catholic
Central Baptist Theological Seminary	Shawnee, Kansas	Molly T. Marshall (President and Professor of Theology and Spiritual Formation)	1962	American Baptist Churches USA
Chapman Seminary of Oakland City University	Oakland City, Indiana	Ray G. Barber (President)	2004	General Association of General Baptists
Chicago Theological Seminary	Chicago, Illinois	Alice W. Hunt (President)	1938	United Church of Christ
China Evangelical Seminary North America	West Covina, California	James Hudson Taylor, IV (President)	2015	Nondenominational
Christian Theological Seminary	Indianapolis, Indiana	David M. Mellott (President)	1944	Christian Church (Disciples of Christ)
Church Divinity School of the Pacific	Berkeley, California	W. Mark Richardson (President and Dean)	1938	Episcopal Church
Claremont School of Theology	Claremont, California	Jerry D. Campbell (President)	1944	United Methodist Church
Colgate Rochester Crozer Divinity School	Rochester, New York	Angela D. Sims (President)	1938	American Baptist Churches USA
Columbia International University Seminary & School of Ministry	Columbia, South Carolina	William H. Jones (President and CEO)	1985	Inter/Multidenominational
Columbia Theological Seminary	Decatur, Georgia	Stephen A. Hayner (President)	1938	Presbyterian Church (U.S.A.)
Concordia Lutheran Seminary	Edmonton, Alberta	Norman J. Threinen (Interim President)	1998	Lutheran Church-Canada
Concordia Lutheran Theological Seminary	St Catharines, Ontario	Thomas M. Winger (President)	2011	Lutheran Church-Canada
Concordia Seminary	St. Louis, Missouri	Dale A. Meyer (President)	1963	Lutheran Church-Missouri Synod
Concordia Theological Seminary	Fort Wayne, Indiana	Lawrence R. Rast (President)	1968	Lutheran Church-Missouri Synod
Cornerstone Theological Seminary of Cornerstone University	Grand Rapids, Michigan	Joseph Stowell (President )	2002	Inter/Multidenominational
Covenant Theological Seminary	St. Louis, Missouri	Mark Dalbey (Interim President)	1983	Presbyterian Church in America
Dallas Theological Seminary	Dallas, Texas	Mark L. Bailey (President)	1994	Inter/Multidenominational
Denver Seminary	Littleton, Colorado	Mark S. Young (President)	1970	Inter/Multidenominational
Dominican House of Studies	Washington, D.C.	Steven C. Boguslawski (President)	1976	Roman Catholic
Dominican School of Philosophy and Theology	Berkeley, California	Michael Sweeney (President)	1978	Roman Catholic
Drew University Theological School	Madison, New Jersey	Jeffrey Kuan (Dean)	1938	United Methodist Church
Duke University Divinity School	Durham, North Carolina	L. Gregory Jones (Dean)	1938	United Methodist Church
Earlham School of Religion (Earlham College)	Richmond, Indiana	Jay Wade Marshall (Dean)	1973	Religious Society of Friends
Eastern Mennonite Seminary of Eastern Mennonite University	Harrisonburg, Virginia	Susan Schultz Huxman (President)	1986	Mennonite Church USA
Ecumenical Theological Seminary	Detroit, Michigan	Kenneth Harris (President and Dean)	2005	Inter/Multidenominational
Eden Theological Seminary	St. Louis, Missouri	David M. Greenhaw (President)	1938	United Church of Christ
Emmanuel Christian Seminary	Johnson City, Tennessee	Michael L. Sweeney (President)	1981	Christian Churches and Churches of Christ
Emmanuel College of Victoria University	Toronto, Ontario	Mark G. Toulouse (Principal)	1938	United Church of Canada
Erskine Theological Seminary	Due West, South Carolina	Stephen D. Lowe (Interim Vice President)	1981	Associate Reformed Presbyterian Church
Evangelical Theological Seminary (now Kairos University)	Myerstown, Pennsylvania	Anthony L. Blair (President)	1987	Evangelical Congregational Church
Franciscan School of Theology	Oceanside, California	Garrett Galvin (President)	1975	Roman Catholic
Fresno Pacific University Biblical Seminary	Fresno, California	Franklyn Jost (Vice President and Academic Dean)	1977	Mennonite Brethren Church in North America
Fuller Theological Seminary	Pasadena, California	David Emmanuel Goatley (President)	1947	Inter/Multidenominational
Garrett-Evangelical Theological Seminary	Evanston, Illinois	Lallene J. Rector (President)	1938	United Methodist Church
Gateway Seminary	Ontario, California	Jeff Iorg (President)	1962	Southern Baptist Convention
General Theological Seminary	New York, New York	Lang Lowrey III (Interim President)	1938	Episcopal Church
George Fox University, Portland Seminary	Portland, Oregon	Tammy Dunahoo (Executive Dean)	1974	Inter/Multidenominational
George W. Truett Theological Seminary of Baylor University	Waco, Texas	Todd D. Still (Dean)	2002	Baptist General Convention of Texas
Gordon-Conwell Theological Seminary	South Hamilton, Massachusetts	Dennis P. Hollinger (President)	1964	Inter/Multidenominational
Grace Theological Seminary	Winona Lake, Indiana	Ronald E. Manahan (President)	2010	Fellowship of Grace Brethren Churches
Graduate Theological Union	Berkeley, California	James A. Donahue (President)	1969	Inter/Multidenominational
Harding School of Theology	Memphis, Tennessee	Evertt W. Huffard (Vice President/Dean)	1997	Churches of Christ
Hartford International University for Religion and Peace	Hartford, Connecticut	Joel Lohr (President)	1938	Inter/Multidenominational
Harvard Divinity School	Cambridge, Massachusetts	David Hempton (Dean)	1940	Inter/Multidenominational
Hazelip School of Theology of Lipscomb University	Nashville, Tennessee	Terry Briley (Dean of College of Bible and Ministry)	2011	Churches of Christ
Holy Cross Greek Orthodox School of Theology	Brookline, Massachusetts	Nicholas C. Triantafilou (President)	1974	Greek Orthodox Archdiocese of America
Hood Theological Seminary	Salisbury, North Carolina	Albert Aymer (President)	1998	African Methodist Episcopal Zion
Howard University School of Divinity	Washington, D.C.	Alton B. Pollard III (Dean)	1938	Nondenominational
Huron University College, Faculty of Theology	London, Ontario	Stephen McClatchie (Principal)	1981	Anglican Church of Canada
Iliff School of Theology	Denver, Colorado	Boyung Lee (Dean)	1938	United Methodist Church
Immaculate Conception Seminary of Seton Hall University	South Orange, New Jersey	Joseph Reilly (Rector and Dean)	1977	Roman Catholic
Inter-American Adventist Theological Seminary	Miami, Florida	Jaime Castrejon (President/Dean)	2011	Seventh-day Adventist
Interdenominational Theological Center	Atlanta, Georgia	Ronald Peters (President)	1960	Inter/Multidenominational
International Theological Seminary	El Monte, California	Melvin Loucks (President)	2006	Nondenominational
James and Carolyn McAfee School of Theology of Mercer University	Atlanta, Georgia	R. Alan Culpepper (Dean of the School of Theology)	2002	Cooperative Baptist Fellowship
Jesuit School of Theology of Santa Clara University	Berkeley, California	Thomas J. Massaro (Dean)	1971	Roman Catholic
John Leland Center for Theological Studies	Arlington, Virginia	Mark J. Olson (President)	2006	Baptist General Association of Virginia
Kenrick-Glennon Seminary	St. Louis, Missouri	John Horn (President-Rector)	1973	Roman Catholic
Knox College	Toronto, Ontario	J. Dorcas Gordon (Principal)	1938	Presbyterian Church in Canada
Knox Theological Seminary	Fort Lauderdale, Florida	Ronald Kovack (President )	2005	Presbyterian Church in America
Lexington Theological Seminary	Lexington, Kentucky	Charisse Gillett (President)	1938	Christian Church (Disciples of Christ)
Logos Evangelical Seminary	El Monte, California	Felix Liu (President)	1999	Evangelical Formosan Church
Louisville Presbyterian Theological Seminary	Louisville, Kentucky	Michael Jinkins (President)	1938	Presbyterian Church (U.S.A.)
Loyola Marymount University, Department of Theological Studies	Los Angeles, California	Jonathan Rothchild (Chair of Theological Studies)	2007	Roman Catholic
Luther Seminary	St. Paul, Minnesota	Robin J. Steinke (President)	1944	Evangelical Lutheran Church in America
Lutheran School of Theology at Chicago	Chicago, Illinois	Shauna Hannan (President)	1945	Evangelical Lutheran Church in America
Lutheran Theological Seminary, Saskatoon	Saskatoon, Saskatchewan	Kevin A. Ogilvie (President)	1976	Evangelical Lutheran Church in Canada
Lutheran Theological Southern Seminary	Hickory, North Carolina	Rev. Dr. Chad Rimmer, PhD (Rector and Dean)	1944	Evangelical Lutheran Church in America
M. Christopher White School of Divinity of Gardner-Webb University	Boiling Springs, North Carolina	Robert W. Canoy (Dean/CEO)	2000	Baptist State Convention of North Carolina
Martin Luther University College	Waterloo, Ontario	David Pfrimmer (Principal-Dean)	1982	Evangelical Lutheran Church in Canada
McCormick Theological Seminary	Chicago, Illinois	Frank Yamada (President)	1938	Presbyterian Church (U.S.A.)
McGill University Faculty of Religious Studies	Montreal, Quebec	Ellen B. Aitken (Dean)	1952	Inter/Multidenominational
McMaster Divinity College	Hamilton, Ontario	Stanley E. Porter (President and Dean)	1954	Baptist Convention of Ontario and Quebec
Meadville Lombard Theological School	Chicago, Illinois	Elias Ortega (President)	1940	Unitarian Universalist
Memphis Theological Seminary	Memphis, Tennessee	Jody Hill (President)	1973	Cumberland Presbyterian Church
Methodist Theological School in Ohio	Delaware, Ohio	Jay A. Rundell (President)	1965	United Methodist Church
Mid-America Reformed Seminary	Dyer, Indiana	Cornelis P. Venema (President)	2010	Inter/Multidenominational
Midwestern Baptist Theological Seminary	Kansas City, Missouri	Jason K. Allen (President)	1964	Southern Baptist Convention
Montreal School of Theology	Montreal, Quebec	John Vissers (Director Montreal School of Theology and Principal Presbyterian College)	1989	Inter/Multidenominational
Moody Theological Seminary of the Moody Bible Institute	Chicago, Illinois	J. Paul Nyquist (President)	2012	Nondenominational
Moravian Theological Seminary	Bethlehem, Pennsylvania	Christopher M. Thomforde (President)	1954	Moravian Church in North America
Mount Angel Seminary	Saint Benedict, Oregon	Joseph V. Betschart (President-Rector)	1978	Roman Catholic
Mount Saint Mary's Seminary	Emmitsburg, Maryland	Msgr. Andrew Baker (Rector)	1987	Roman Catholic
Multnomah Biblical Seminary of Jessup University	Portland, Oregon	Daniel R. Lockwood (President)	1996	Nondenominational
Nashotah House	Nashotah, Wisconsin	Edward L. Salmon (Dean and President)	1954	Episcopal Church
Nazarene Theological Seminary	Kansas City, Missouri	Carla Sunberg (President)	1970	Church of the Nazarene
New Brunswick Theological Seminary	New Brunswick, New Jersey	Gregg A. Mast (President)	1938	Reformed Church in America
New Orleans Baptist Theological Seminary	New Orleans, Louisiana	James K Dew (President)	1954	Southern Baptist Convention
Newman Theological College	Edmonton, Alberta	Jo-Ann Badley (President)	1992	Roman Catholic
North Park Theological Seminary	Chicago, Illinois	David W. Kersten (Dean of the Seminary)	1963	Evangelical Covenant Church
Northeastern Seminary at Roberts Wesleyan College	Rochester, New York	John A. Martin (President)	2003	Multidenominational
Northern Baptist Theological Seminary	Lombard, Illinois	Joy J. Moore (President)	1968	American Baptist Churches USA
Notre Dame Seminary	New Orleans, Louisiana	James A. Wehner (Rector/President)	1979	Roman Catholic
Oblate School of Theology	San Antonio, Texas	Ronald Rolheiser (President)	1982	Roman Catholic
Oral Roberts University, College of Theology and Ministry	Tulsa, Oklahoma	Thomson K. Mathew (Dean, Graduate School of Theology and Ministry)	1980	Inter/Multidenominational
Pacific Lutheran Theological Seminary	Berkeley, California	Colleen Windham-Hughes (Rector)	1964	Evangelical Lutheran Church in America
Pacific School of Religion	Berkeley, California	Riess W. Potterveld (President)	1938	Inter/Multidenominational
Palmer Theological Seminary of Eastern University	Wynnewood, Pennsylvania	Kenton Sparks (Eastern University Provost)	1954	American Baptist Churches USA
Payne Theological Seminary	Wilberforce, Ohio	Leah Gaskin Fitchue (President)	1995	African Methodist Episcopal
Pentecostal Theological Seminary	Cleveland, Tennessee	Michael L Baker (President)	1989	Church of God (Cleveland, Tennessee)
Perkins School of Theology (Southern Methodist University)	Dallas, Texas	William B. Lawrence (Dean)	1938	United Methodist Church
Phillips Theological Seminary	Tulsa, Oklahoma	Gary E. Peluso-Verdend (President)	1940	Christian Church (Disciples of Christ)
Phoenix Seminary	Phoenix, Arizona	Darryl L. DelHousaye (President)	2002	Inter/Multidenominational
Pittsburgh Theological Seminary	Pittsburgh, Pennsylvania	William J. Carl III (President)	1938	Presbyterian Church (U.S.A.)
Pontifical College Josephinum	Columbus, Ohio	Christopher J. Schreck (Rector)	1970	Roman Catholic
Princeton Theological Seminary	Princeton, New Jersey	Jonathan Lee Walton (President)	1938	Presbyterian Church (U.S.A.)
Providence Theological Seminary	Otterburne, Manitoba	David H. Johnson (President)	1992	Inter/Multidenominational
Puritan Reformed Theological Seminary	Grand Rapids, Michigan	Joel R. Beeke (President)	2014	Reformed
Queen's School of Religion	Kingston, Ontario	Richard S. Ascough (Director)	1986	United Church of Canada
Reformed Episcopal Seminary	Oreland, Pennsylvania	Matthew Harrington (President and Dean)	2013	Reformed Episcopal Church Anglican
Reformed Presbyterian Theological Seminary	Pittsburgh, Pennsylvania	Jerry F. O'Neill (President)	1994	Reformed Presbyterian
Reformed Theological Seminary	Jackson, Mississippi	Michael A. Milton (Chancellor and chief executive officer)	1977	Inter/Multidenominational
Regent College	Vancouver, British Columbia	Rod Wilson (President)	1985	Inter/Multidenominational
Regent University School of Divinity	Virginia Beach, Virginia	Michael Palmer (Dean, School of Divinity)	1993	Nondenominational
Regis College	Toronto, Ontario	John E. Costello (President)	1970	Roman Catholic
Sacred Heart Major Seminary	Detroit, Michigan	Stephen Burr (Rector-President)	1991	Roman Catholic
Sacred Heart School of Theology	Hales Corners, Wisconsin	Ross Shecterle (President-Rector)	1981	Roman Catholic
Saint John’s Seminary	Brighton, Massachusetts	Arthur L. Kennedy (Rector)	1970	Roman Catholic
Saint Mary Seminary and Graduate School of Theology	Wickliffe, Ohio	Mark A. Latcovich (President-Rector)	1968	Roman Catholic
Saint Meinrad School of Theology	St. Meinrad, Indiana	Denis Robinson (President-Rector)	1968	Roman Catholic
Saint Paul School of Theology	Kansas City, Missouri	Myron F. McCoy (President)	1964	United Methodist Church
Saint Paul Seminary School of Divinity of the University of St. Thomas	St. Paul, Minnesota	Andrew H. Cozzens (Rector and Vice President, interim)	1974	Roman Catholic
Saint Vincent Seminary	Latrobe, Pennsylvania	Timothy F. Whalen (Rector)	1984	Roman Catholic
Samuel DeWitt Proctor School of Theology of Virginia Union University	Richmond, Virginia	Corey D. B. Walker (Dean)	1971	Baptist
San Francisco Theological Seminary	San Anselmo, California	James McDonald (President)	1938	Presbyterian Church (U.S.A.)
Seattle University School of Theology and Ministry	Seattle, Washington	Mark S. Markuly (Dean, School of Theology and Ministry)	1993	Roman Catholic
Seminary of the Southwest	Austin, Texas	Douglas B. Travis (Dean and President)	1958	Episcopal Church
Seventh-day Adventist Theological Seminary of Andrews University	Berrien Springs, Michigan	Denis Fortin (Dean)	1970	Seventh-day Adventist
Sewanee University of the South, School of Theology	Sewanee, Tennessee	J. Neil Alexander (Dean of the School)	1958	Episcopal Church
Shaw University Divinity School	Raleigh, North Carolina	Bruce T. Grady (Dean)	1997	General Baptist State Convention of North Carolina
Shepherds Theological Seminary	Cary, North Carolina	Tim Sigler (Dean)	2011	Southern Baptist Convention
Sioux Falls Seminary (now Kairos University)	Sioux Falls, South Dakota	Gregory J. Henson (President)	1968	North American Baptist Conference
Southeastern Baptist Theological Seminary	Wake Forest, North Carolina	Daniel L. Akin (President)	1958	Southern Baptist Convention
Southern Baptist Theological Seminary	Louisville, Kentucky	R. Albert Mohler Jr. (President)	1938	Southern Baptist Convention
Southwestern Baptist Theological Seminary	Fort Worth, Texas	Jeffrey Bingham (Interim President)	1940	Southern Baptist Convention
St. Andrew's College	Saskatoon, Saskatchewan	Lorne Calvert (Principal)	1996	United Church of Canada
St. Augustine's Seminary of Toronto	Toronto, Ontario	Edwin Gonsalves (Rector)	1980	Roman Catholic
St. Bernard's School of Theology and Ministry	Rochester, New York	Patricia A. Schoelles (President)	1970	Roman Catholic
St. Charles Borromeo Seminary	Wynnewood, Pennsylvania	Timothy Senior (Rector)	1970	Roman Catholic
St. John Vianney Theological Seminary	Denver, Colorado	Michael Glenn (Rector)	2008	Roman Catholic
St. John's Seminary (California)	Camarillo, California	Craig Cox (Rector and President)	1976	Roman Catholic
St. Joseph's Seminary	Yonkers, New York	Peter I. Vaccari (Rector)	1973	Roman Catholic
St. Mary's Seminary and University	Baltimore, Maryland	Phillip J. Brown (President-Rector)	1971	Roman Catholic
St. Peter's Seminary	London, Ontario	Denis Grecco (Rector)	1986	Roman Catholic
St. Stephen's College	Edmonton, Alberta	Kae Neufeld (Acting Principal and Dean)	2023	United Church of Canada
St. Tikhon's Orthodox Theological Seminary	South Canaan, Pennsylvania	Alexander Atty (Dean/chief operating officer)	2004	Orthodox Church in America
St. Vincent de Paul Regional Seminary	Boynton Beach, Florida	Alfredo Hernandez (Rector)	1984	Roman Catholic
St. Vladimir's Orthodox Theological Seminary	Crestwood, New York	John Behr (Dean)	1973	Orthodox Church in America
Starr King School for the Ministry	Berkeley, California	Rosemary Bray McNatt (President)	1978	Unitarian Universalist
Talbot School of Theology of Biola University	La Mirada, California	Barry H. Corey (President)	1978	Inter/Multidenominational
The Catholic University of America School of Theology and Religious Studies	Washington, D.C.	Mark M. Morozowich (Acting Dean)	1980	Roman Catholic
The Seattle School of Theology and Psychology	Seattle, Washington	J. Derek McNeil (Acting Dean)	2013	Inter/Multidenominational
Trinity Anglican Seminary	Ambridge, Pennsylvania	Justyn Terry (Dean and President)	1985	Anglican
Trinity College Faculty of Divinity	Toronto, Ontario	Andrew Orchard (Provost)	1938	Anglican Church of Canada
Trinity Evangelical Divinity School of Trinity International University	Deerfield, Illinois	David Dockery (President)	1973	Evangelical Free Church of America
Trinity Lutheran Seminary	Columbus, Ohio	Rachel Wren (Dean)	1940	Evangelical Lutheran Church in America
Tyndale University	Toronto, Ontario	Gary V. Nelson (President and chief executive officer)	1989	Inter/Multidenominational
Union Presbyterian Seminary	Richmond, Virginia	Brian K. Blount (President)	1938	Presbyterian Church (U.S.A.)
Union Theological Seminary	New York, New York	Serene Jones (President)	1938	Inter/Multidenominational
United Lutheran Seminary	Gettysburg, Pennsylvania and Philadelphia, Pennsylvania	R. Guy Erwin (President)	1938	Evangelical Lutheran Church in America
United Theological Seminary of the Twin Cities	New Brighton, Minnesota	Barbara A. Holmes (President)	1966	United Church of Christ
United Theological Seminary	Dayton, Ohio	Wendy J. Deichmann (President and chief executive officer)	1938	United Methodist Church
University of Chicago Divinity School	Chicago, Illinois	Margaret M. Mitchell (Dean)	1938	Inter/Multidenominational
University of Notre Dame, Department of Theology	Notre Dame, Indiana	J. Matthew Ashley (Chair)	1977	Roman Catholic
University of Saint Mary of the Lake (Mundelein Seminary)	Mundelein, Illinois	John Kartje (Rector)	1972	Roman Catholic
University of St. Michael's College (Faculty of Theology)	Toronto, Ontario	Anne T. Anderson (President)	1972	Roman Catholic
Urshan Graduate School of Theology	Florissant, Missouri	David K. Bernard (President)	2010	United Pentecostal Church International
Vancouver School of Theology	Vancouver, British Columbia	Richard Topping (Principal and Dean)	1976	Inter/Multidenominational
Vanderbilt University Divinity School	Nashville, Tennessee	Emilie M. Townes (Dean of the Divinity School)	1938	Nondenominational
Virginia Theological Seminary	Alexandria, Virginia	Ian Markham (Dean and President)	1938	Episcopal Church
Wake Forest University School of Divinity	Winston-Salem, North Carolina	Gail R. O'Day (Dean and Professor of New Testament and Preaching)	2005	Inter/Multidenominational
Wartburg Theological Seminary	Dubuque, Iowa	Kristin Johnston Largen (President)	1944	Evangelical Lutheran Church in America
Wesley Biblical Seminary	Jackson, Mississippi	John Oswalt (Interim President)	1991	Inter/Multidenominational
Wesley Theological Seminary	Washington, D.C.	David F. McAllister-Wilson (President)	1940	United Methodist Church
Western Seminary	Portland, Oregon	Randal R. Roberts (President)	2000	Conservative Baptist Association of America
Western Theological Seminary	Holland, Michigan	Timothy L. Brown (President)	1940	Reformed Church in America
Westminster Seminary California	Escondido, California	W. Robert Godfrey (President)	1997	Inter/Multidenominational
Westminster Theological Seminary	Philadelphia, Pennsylvania	Peter A. Lillback (President)	1986	Inter/Multidenominational
Winebrenner Theological Seminary	Findlay, Ohio	Brent C. Sleasman (President)	1991	Churches of God, General Conference
Wycliffe College	Toronto, Ontario	Stephen Andrews (Principal)	1978	Anglican Church of Canada
Yale Divinity School	New Haven, Connecticut	Gregory E. Sterling (Dean)	1938	Inter/Multidenominational

== Institutes accredited in the 2020s ==
By 2026, several more institutes had been accredited at ATS, including:

- Berkeley School of Theology
- BSK Theological Seminary. Kentucky
- Catholic International University Graduate School of Theology. West Virginia
- Central Baptist Theological Seminary of Minneapolis
- Christ School of Theology of the Institute of Lutheran Theology, South Dakota
- Christian Witness Theological Seminary, California
- Crown College, Graduate School of Ministry, Minnesota
- Dickerson-Green Theological Seminary of Allen University
- Freed-Hardeman University Graduate School of Theology
- Georgia Central University School of Divinity
- GETS Theological Seminary California
- Grace Mission University Graduate School California
- Grace School of Theology Texas
- Graduate School of Theology and Ministry in Puerto Rico, St. Albert the Great at Bayamón Central University
- Grand Canyon Theological Seminary, Grand Canyon University
- Henry Appenzeller University
- Heritage Christian University, Graduate School of Theology
- Heritage Theological Seminary
- HMS Richards Divinity School Division of Graduate Studies of La Sierra University
- Holy Apostles College and Seminary
- Interamerican University of Puerto Rico, Metropolitan Campus, Department of Theology and History
- International Reformed University and Seminary California
- Kairos University
- Kearley Graduate School of Theology of Faulkner University
- Liberty Theological Seminary
- Loyola University Chicago, Institute of Pastoral Studies
- Lutheran Theological Seminary, Saskatoon
- Missio Theological Seminary
- Northwest Nazarene University, Graduate School of Theology
- Northwest Seminary Canada
- Northwest University, College of Ministry Graduate Studies
- Pacific Christian College of Ministry and Biblical Studies of Hope International University
- Palm Beach Atlantic University, School of Ministry Graduate Department
- Payne Theological Seminary
- Pope St. John XXIII National Seminary
- Presbyterian Theological Seminary in America California
- Saint John's University, School of Theology and Seminary
- Saint Sophia Ukrainian Orthodox Theological Seminary New Jersey
- Seattle Pacific Seminary
- Seminario Evangélico de Puerto Rico
- Southeastern University, School of Divinity
- Southern California Seminary Graduate School of Bible and Theology
- St. Mark's College, Vancouver, at the University of British Columbia, Canada
- The King's Seminary at The King's University, Texas
- The Master's Seminary
- University of Dubuque, Theological Seminary
- University of Northwestern - St. Paul, School of Theology and Ministry
- Villanova University, Department of Theology and Religious Studies
- Wesley Seminary
- Wisconsin Lutheran Seminary
- World Mission University, School of Theology, California

== Institutes once accredited by ATS that have closed ==
- New York Theological Seminary
