= St. Andrew's College, Saskatoon =

Educational institution in Saskatchewan, Canada

St. Andrew's College
- Former name: Presbyterian Theological College
- Established: 1912
- Religious affiliation: United Church of Canada
- Academic affiliations: Saskatoon Theological Union; Association of Theological Schools in the United States and Canada; University of Saskatchewan
- Principal: Richard Manley-Tannis
- Location: 52.129°N 106.642°W
- Website: standrews.ca

St. Andrew’s College, formerly the Presbyterian Theological College, is a degree-granting, accredited theologically ecumenical seminary of the United Church of Canada. It is located in Saskatoon, Saskatchewan, and was the second affiliated college of the University of Saskatchewan. Along with the College of Emmanuel and St. Chad (Anglican Church of Canada), and the Lutheran Theological Seminary, Saskatoon (Evangelical Lutheran Church in Canada), it makes up the Saskatoon Theological Union (STU).

== History ==
The Presbyterian Theological College was founded in 1912 and confirmed by an Act of the Saskatchewan Legislature in 1913. That same year, Edmund H. Oliver began his tenure as the first principal of the college, appointed by the Presbyterian General Assembly of Canada. The college was initially founded to meet the needs of students "who had declared their intention of entering the ministry", and in 1920 started training workers among New Canadians.

In 1914, Presbyterian Theological College began the construction of a building on the University of Saskatchewan property but was disrupted by World War I after most of its student body enlisted. The building that St. Andrew's currently occupies was developed in 1922. It had 28 students in 1921-22: ten from Canada, seven from Scotland, five from England, three from Ireland, and one each from France, Hungary, and the United States.

In 1925, Presbyterian Theological College was renamed St. Andrew's College, following the formation of the United Church of Canada.

== Social justice and equity ==
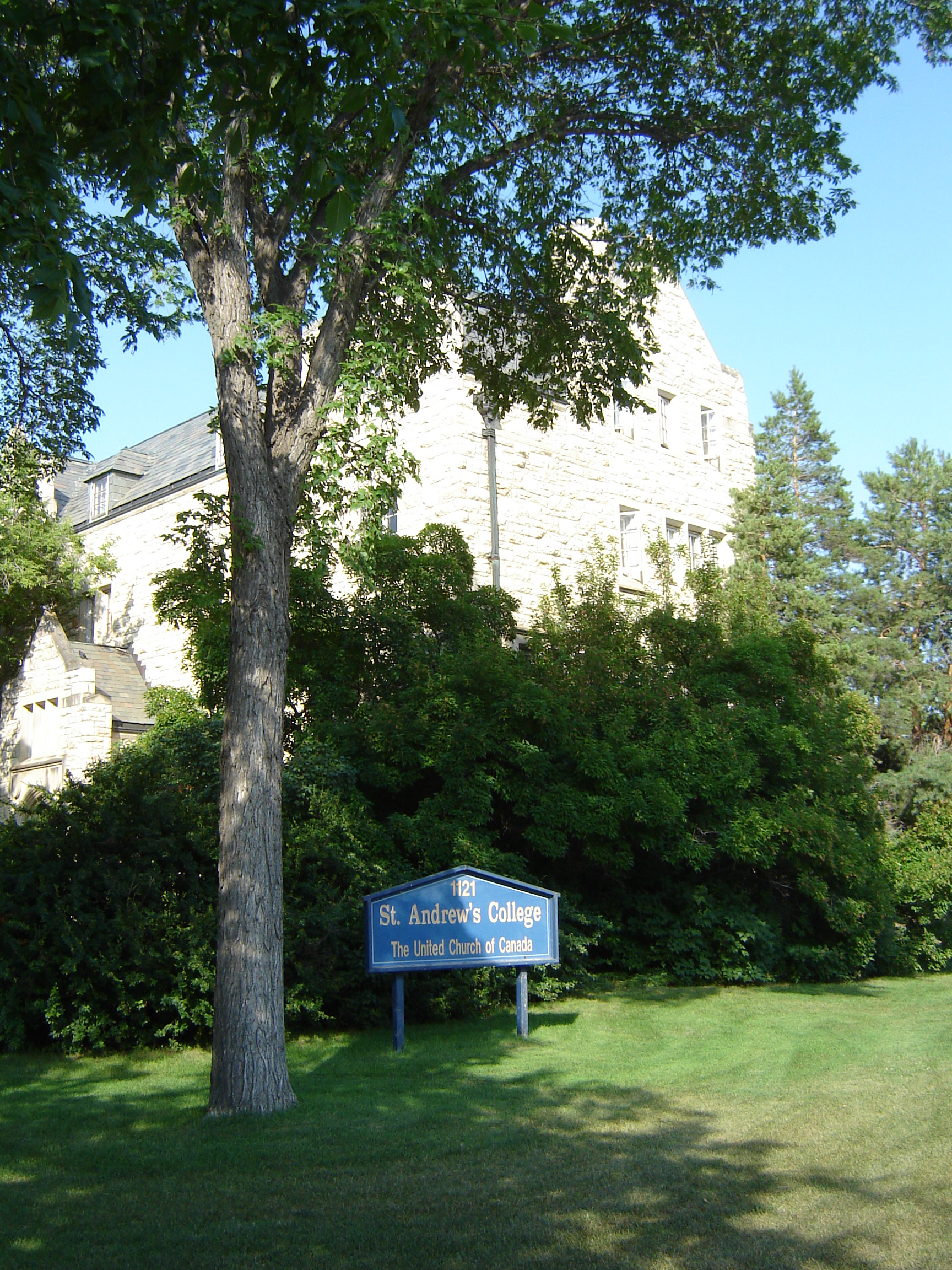
The college building dates from 1922.

St. Andrew's invested its first woman graduate in 1922, Lydia Emelie Gruchy, though it would take an additional 13 years for her ordination by the United Church of Canada. The college had a number of conscientious objectors in World War II and the government threatened to close the college in 1942 unless all eligible men would enlist.

The concept of justice and equity were increasingly preoccupations of the college throughout the 1960s, cementing its reputation as a progressive and politically activist theological school. The 1970s saw a shift in student demographics as more women began enrolling and graduating. In 2009, St. Andrew’s began participating in the Affirming Ministries Program of Affirm United, a further shift for inclusivity and equity among diverse sexual orientations and gender identities.

== Programs ==
St. Andrew’s offers a variety of programs, including Master of Divinity (MDiv), Master of Theological Studies (MTS), and Doctor of Ministry (DMin) degrees. A range of learning certificates are also available, including “Leadership in the Faith Community”, “Leadership in the World”, and “Spiritual Exploration.” St. Andrew's is accredited through the Association of Theological Schools in the United States and Canada.
