= Taylor University College =

Taylor University College may refer to:

- Taylor University College and Seminary, in Edmonton, Alberta, Canada
- Taylor's University College, in Selangor, Malaysia
