= Houston Graduate School of Theology =

Multidenominational seminary

- Motto: Missional. Multicultural. Multidenominational.
- Type: Private seminary
- Active: 1983–2023 (projected)
- Parent institution: Kairos University
- Religious affiliation: Evangelical
- Academic affiliations: Association of Theological Schools in the United States and Canada
- President: Becky Towne
- Location: Houston, Texas, United States; 29.6736°N 95.4487°W
- Website: hgst.edu

Houston Graduate School of Theology (HGST) is a private evangelical seminary in Houston, Texas. It is part of Kairos University.

== History ==
Houston Graduate School of Theology was founded in 1983 by Dr. Delbert Vaughn and his wife, Carol. The Vaughns were associated with the Evangelical Friends Church. It was initially housed in the Texas Medical Center. For the first 15 years of its existence, the school was affiliated with the Evangelical Friends Church - Mid America. It later moved to other properties: the Adams Petroleum Building in 1987 and Central Congregational Church in 1996. In 2013, HGST moved to the Willow Meadows Baptist Church campus. In 2021, the school's director of DMin program, Dr. Becky Towne, became its fifth and final president, having determined that in 2023, HGST will become a Legacy Partner within Kairos, merging with the global consortium of theological schools.

It training students from more than 30 denominational traditions.

In 2021, it became a founding member of the university network Kairos University.

== Academics ==
HGST offers six degree programs:

- Master of Divinity (M.Div.)
- Master of Arts in Counseling (MAC)
- Master of Arts in Christian Ministry (MACM)
- Master of Theological Studies (MTS)
- Doctor of Ministry (D.Min.)
- Doctor of Professional Counseling (DPC)

== Alumni ==
- Samuel Jackson Gilbert Jr., pastor-emeritus Mt. Sinai Baptist Church, Houston, Texas.
- Ken Gross, author of the Emotional Prisons series.
- Donald C. Simmons Jr., former dean at Dakota Wesleyan University, Director of Pastoral Care at North Mississippi Medical Center, pastor, author and editor of Organizational Leadership: Foundations and Practices for Christians (Intervarsity Press).
- Becky Towne, pastor and dean of Houston Graduate School of Theology.

== Accreditation ==
HGST was accredited by the Commission on Accrediting of the Association of Theological Schools in the United States and Canada (ATS); this was discontinued by 2024.
