= Saskatchewan Synod =

The Saskatchewan synod is one of the five synods of the Evangelical Lutheran Church in Canada (ELCIC).

The synod comprises congregations and ministries in the province of Saskatchewan and four congregations located in western Manitoba. There are 115 congregations comprising about 26,000 baptized members and 3 ministries.

Their office is located at #6 – 2220 Northridge Drive in Saskatoon, Saskatchewan. As of June 2024, Rev. Dr. Ali Tote is serving as the bishop.

The ELCIC has two seminaries, one of which is located within the Saskatchewan synod border, Lutheran Theological Seminary in Saskatoon.

== Bishops ==
Rev. Telmor Sartison - 1985–1993

Rev. Allan A. Grundahl - 1993–2002

Rev. Cynthia G. (Cindy) Halmarson - 2002–2014

Rev. Dr. Sidney (Sid) Haugen - 2014–2024

Rev. Dr. Ali Tote - 2024–Present

== Conventions ==
1986 - Saskatoon

1988 - Yorkton

1990 - Swift Current

1992 - Regina

1994 - North Battleford

1996 - Estevan

1998 - Saskatoon

2000 - Melville

2002 - Swift Current

2004 -

2006 -

2008 - Assiniboia

2010 - Saskatoon

2012 - Yorkton

2014 - Regina

2016 - Saskatoon

2018 - Regina

2021 - Held Virtually

2024 - Saskatoon
