= Jill Y. Crainshaw =

American theologian and liturgical scholar

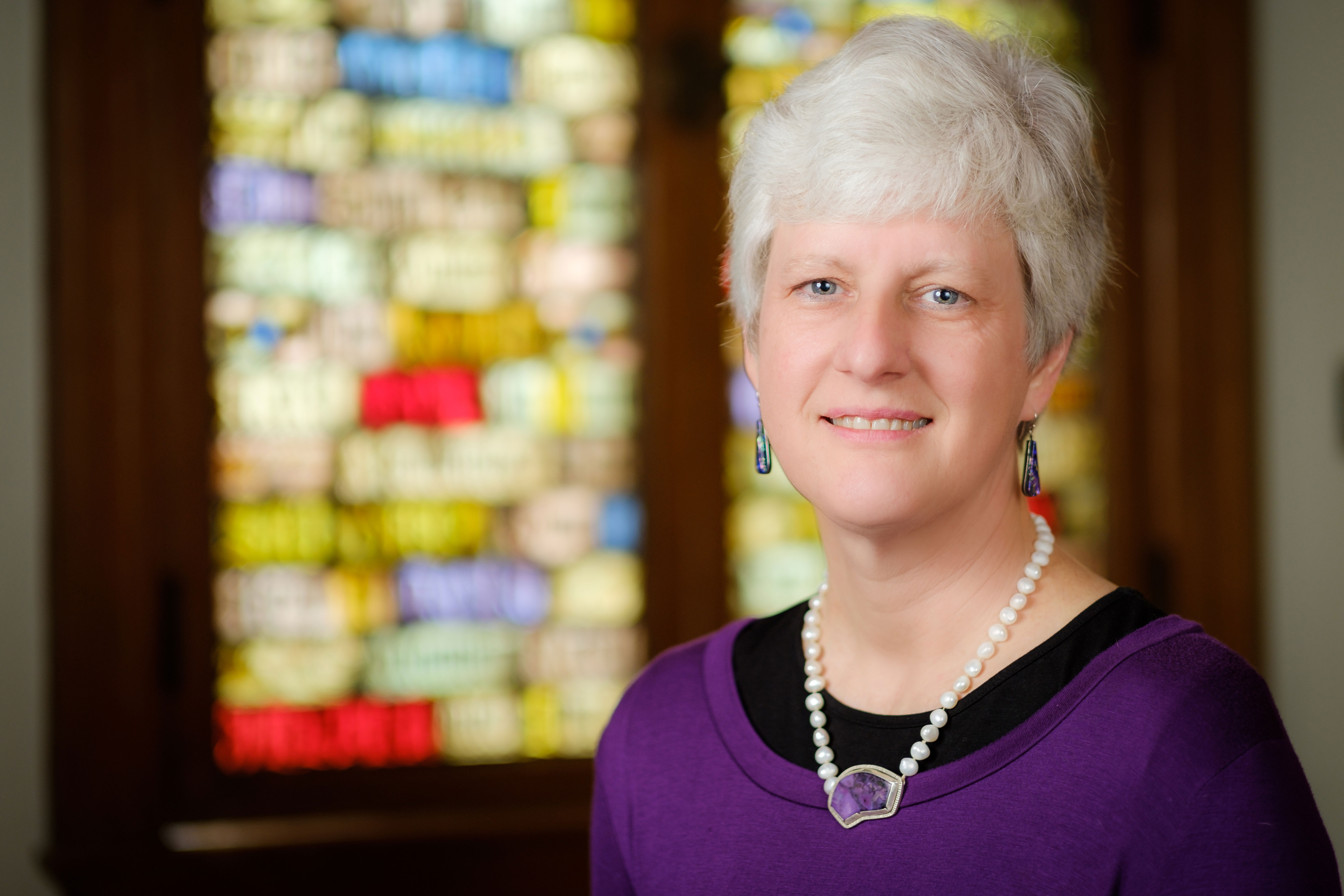

Jill Yvette Crainshaw (born 1962) is an American theologian and liturgical scholar.

Crainshaw earned a bachelor of arts degree at Wake Forest University in 1984, followed by a Master of Divinity from Southeastern Baptist Theological Seminary in 1987. She then completed a doctorate at Union Presbyterian Seminary, in Virginia, in 1997. Crainshaw is the Blackburn Professor of Worship and Liturgical Theology at the Wake Forest University School of Divinity, and served as interim dean of the seminary between the terms of Gail R. O'Day and Jonathan L. Walton. She was appointed Vice Dean of Faculty Development and Academic Initiatives in 2019. Crainshaw delivered the 2019 Aidan Kavanagh Lecture at Yale Divinity School. She is an ordained Minister of Word and Sacrament in the Presbyterian Church, U.S.A.

== Bibliography ==
- Wise and Discerning Hearts: Introduction to a Wisdom Liturgical Theology (Liturgical Press, 2000) ISBN 9780814661826
- Keep the Call: Leading the Congregation Without Losing Your Soul (Abingdon Press, 2002) ISBN 9780687641451
- Wisdom’s Dwelling Place (OSL Publications, 2010) ISBN 9781878009661
- They Spin with Their Hands: Women’s Ordination Rites: Renewing God’s Story with God’s People (OSL Publications, 2015) ISBN 9781505602159
- When I in Awesome Wonder: Liturgy Distilled from Daily Life (Liturgical Press, 2017) ISBN 9780814645574
- Cedars in Snowy Places: Fifty-two Poems (Library Partners Press, 2018) ISBN 9781618460721
