= Evangelical Theological Seminary (disambiguation) =

Evangelical Theological Seminary, now Evangelical Seminary, is a graduate school in Myerstown, Pennsylvania, USA.

Evangelical Theological Seminary may also refer to:

- Garrett–Evangelical Theological Seminary, a graduate school in Evanston, Illinois, USA

Evangelical School of Theology, a former seminary of the Evangelical Church that merged into United Theological Seminary in 1954

== See also ==
- Evangelical School of Smyrna (1733-1922), a Greek secondary school
- Evangelical Seminaries of Maulbronn and Blaubeuren in Germany
