= Divinity School =

Divinity School may refer to:

- The common noun, divinity school
- When used as a proper noun, may be an abbreviated reference to one of the following:
  - Beeson Divinity School
  - Berkeley Divinity School
  - Brite Divinity School
  - Campbell University Divinity School
  - Church Divinity School of the Pacific
  - Colgate Rochester Crozer Divinity School
  - Divinity School, Oxford
  - Duke Divinity School
  - Episcopal Divinity School ( New York City)
  - Trinity Evangelical Divinity School
  - University of Chicago Divinity School
  - Vanderbilt University Divinity School
  - Wake Forest University School of Divinity
  - Yale Divinity School
