= Union Presbyterian Seminary =

Seminary in Virginia, US

Coordinates: 37°34′43.7″N 77°26′57.9″W

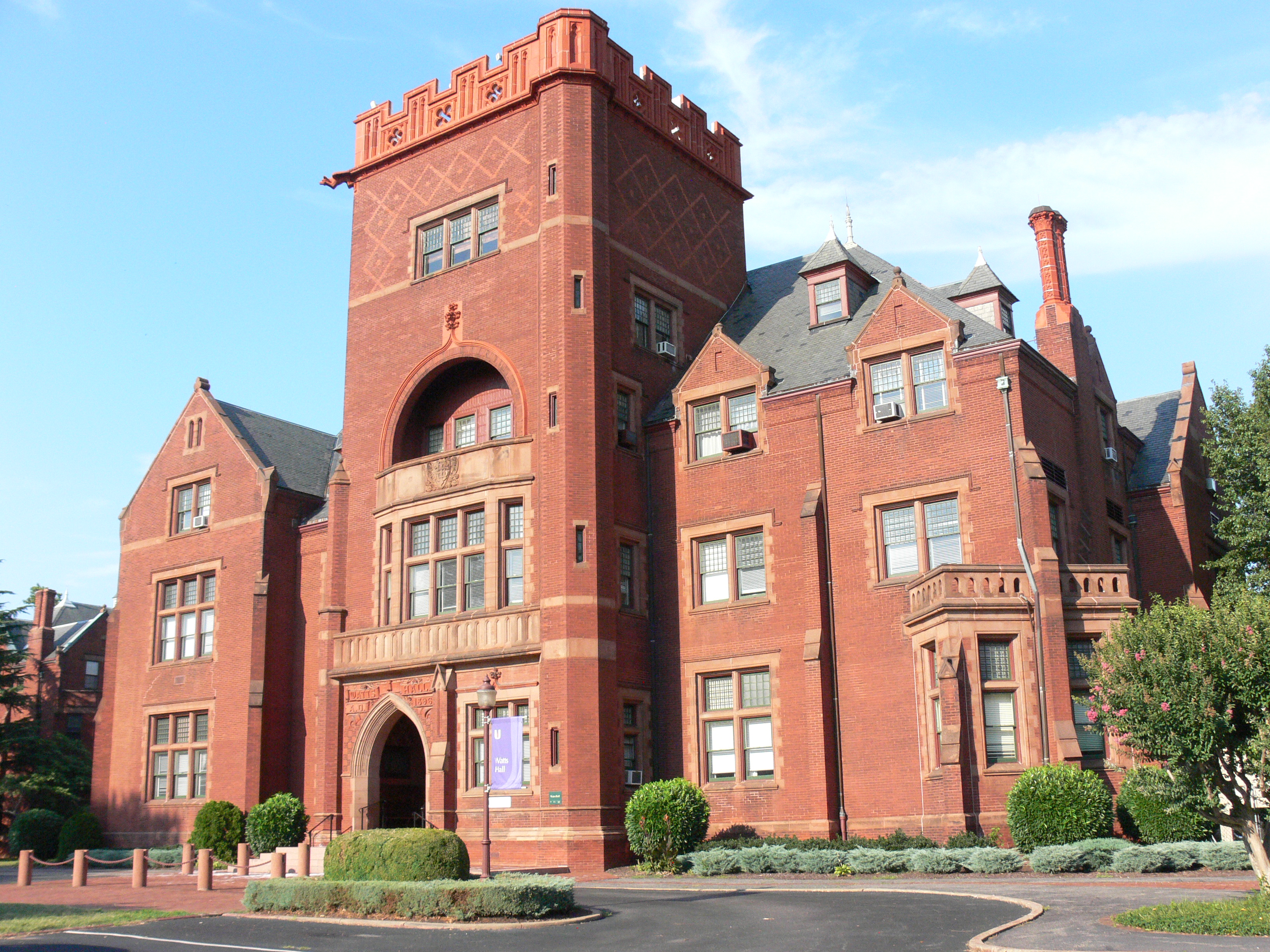
- Type: Private seminary
- Established: 1812; 214 years ago
- Religious affiliation: Presbyterian Church (USA)
- President: Jacqueline Lapsley
- Location: Richmond, Virginia, United States
- Website: www.upsem.edu
- Union Seminary
- U.S. National Register of Historic Places
- Virginia Landmarks Register
- Location within Virginia Location within the United States
- Location: 3401 Brook Rd., Richmond, Virginia, U.S.
- Area: 12 acres (5 ha)
- Built: 1896
- Architect: Multiple
- Architectural style: Late Victorian
- NRHP reference No.: 83003309
- VLR No.: 127-0316

Significant dates
- Added to NRHP: April 14, 1983
- Designated VLR: September 16, 1982

Union Presbyterian Seminary is a Presbyterian seminary in Richmond, Virginia, and Charlotte, North Carolina, offering graduate theological education in multiple modalities: in-person, hybrid, and online.

== History ==
As a result of efforts undertaken together by the Synod of Virginia and the Synod of North Carolina, Union Theological Seminary was founded in 1812 as the theological department of Hampden–Sydney College, located near Farmville, Virginia, and housed in what is now named Venable Hall. In 1895, Lewis Ginter, a financier and philanthropist in Richmond, donated eleven acres of land to the school, which was relocated to its current campus location on the north side of Richmond in 1898. The General Assembly's Training School (ATS) for Lay Workers was founded in Richmond in 1914 as a complementary institution intended to train "workers outside of the regular ordained ministry." In 1959 ATS was renamed the Presbyterian School of Christian Education (PSCE). PSCE offered a master's degree in Christian Education, and operated across the street from Union Seminary until 1997, when Union and PSCE were joined in federation, becoming Union-PSCE. In 2002, a commuter campus in Charlotte, North Carolina, began on the campus of Queens University of Charlotte, offering both M.Div. and M.A.C.E. degrees to part-time students. The Charlotte campus for Union Presbyterian was relocated to its new facility on 5141 Sharon Road in 2012.

In 2009, Union's board of trustees voted to change the name of the institution to Union Presbyterian Seminary, partially as a means of distinguishing it from Union Theological Seminary in the City of New York. In his address announcing the new name, seminary president Brian Blount emphasized the school's unique heritage of several "unions", as well as the school's Presbyterian identity.

For many years, the seminary operated WRFK, an FM radio station at 106.5 MHz. WRFK was sold to commercial interests in 1988.

== Faculty ==
Union has a faculty of scholars in the fields of Bible, Christian education, theology, ethics, preaching, worship, church history, Christian leadership, and pastoral care. Faculty come from a range of denominational backgrounds beyond Presbyterianism, including Baptist, Lutheran, Episcopal, and Methodist scholars. Notable retired faculty include Bible scholars James L. Mays, Frances Taylor Gench, and Brian Blount, as well as famed ethicist Katie Cannon.

== Student body ==
Union's student body is made up of about 180 students, with 90 students at the Richmond campus and 84 more students at the Charlotte campus. The majority of Union's students come from the Presbyterian tradition, but the seminary draws students from more than 20 Christian denominations, including Baptist, Methodist, Episcopalian, and Reformed. There are a number of international students, from Ghana, South Korea, Switzerland, and other nations.

Students at Union take part in a number of student activities and seminary initiatives, such as mission and service activities to Shalom Farms in the city of Richmond.

== Campuses ==
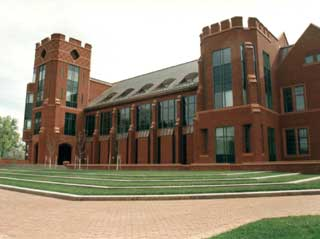
William Smith Morton Library

=== Richmond ===
Union's Richmond campus includes two chapels: the historic Watts Chapel, located in Watts Hall, which also serves as a classroom and administration building; and the state-of-the-art Lake Chapel, located in the campus's Early Center, a classroom and office building completed in 2008. The Richmond campus also includes the Belk student center, dormitories, student apartments, and guest housing, as well as recreation fields, community gardens, and tennis courts. Union's William Smith Morton Library was completed in 1996; it includes over 900,000 volumes and adds about 5,500 volumes per year.

=== Charlotte ===
The seminary's Charlotte campus is located on 5141 Sharon Road. This facility, opened in 2012, houses a chapel, library, classrooms, a regional Christian Education Resource Center, and office facilities.

== Academics ==
The seminary offers Master of Arts, Master of Divinity, Master of Theology, and Doctor of Ministry degrees. It also offers certificates.

As of September 2026, the seminary will cease to provide any residential options for its degree programs. All credit-earning coursework will be offered exclusively online or in a hybrid format. A small population of students will continue to live on the Richmond Campus as "Community Scholars" but will also study in the same hybrid or online formats as their off-campus peers.

== Notable alumni ==
- John M. P. Atkinson: minister; tenth president of Hampden–Sydney College; first president of The Virginia Educational Association
- Myron Augsburger: pastor, theologian, fifth president of Eastern Mennonite University
- John Bright: biblical scholar and author
- Bob Childress: church planter and Presbyterian minister
- Erskine Clarke: historian, author, retired professor at Columbia Theological Seminary, winner of the Bancroft Prize (2006)
- Jill Y. Crainshaw: professor of religion, and Vice Dean of the Faculty at Wake Forest University
- Kathy Dawson: Associate Professor of Christian Education and Director of M.A.P.T. Program at Columbia Theological Seminary; Association of Presbyterian Church Educators' 2015 Educator of the Year
- Pierre Etienne: French poet and monastic brother of the Taizé Community
- Frances Taylor Gench: New Testament scholar
- T. David Gordon: Reformed theologian at Grove City College and Gordon–Conwell Theological Seminary
- Graeme Goldsworthy: Australian–Anglican evangelist, author, retired professor at Moore Theological College
- Leontine Kelly: first black woman to become a bishop in a major Christian denomination (Methodism)
- George Wilson McPhail: minister, sixth president of Lafayette college and fifth president of Davidson College
- Thomas Mar Makarios: bishop of the Indian Orthodox Church; founder of the United States and Canada diocese
- Douglas Oldenburg: a President Emeritus at Columbia Theological Seminary; moderator of the 210th General Assembly of the Presbyterian Church (USA)
- Katherine Paterson: author of Bridge to Terabithia and Jacob Have I Loved; two-time winner of the Newbery Medal and of the National Book Award
- Roy Kinneer Patteson, Jr.: biblical scholar, college administrator
- John Paxton: missionary to China during Boxer Rebellion
- William D. Reynolds: missionary to Korea; lead translator of the first Korean Old and New testament, professor
- W. Taylor Reveley IV: political scientist, 26th president of Longwood University
- Jay W. Richards: author, business professor, fellow at the Discovery Institute, executive editor of The Stream
- Holmes Rolston III: philosopher; professor at Colorado State University; winner of the Templeton Prize (2003)
- John Bunyan Shearer: president of Stewart College, which became Rhodes College; eighth president of Davidson College
- Theodore Wardlaw: theologian, retired president Austin Theological Seminary
- J. Rodman Williams: Presbyterian minister, theologian, and professor of systematic theology; leading figure in the twentieth-century charismatic renewal movement and author of Renewal Theology, a three-volume systematic theology developed from a charismatic perspective. Later served as Professor of Theology at Regent University and Professor of Renewal Theology Emeritus.
- V. Neil Wyrick: pastor, popular Christian author and actor
