= Eastern Synod =

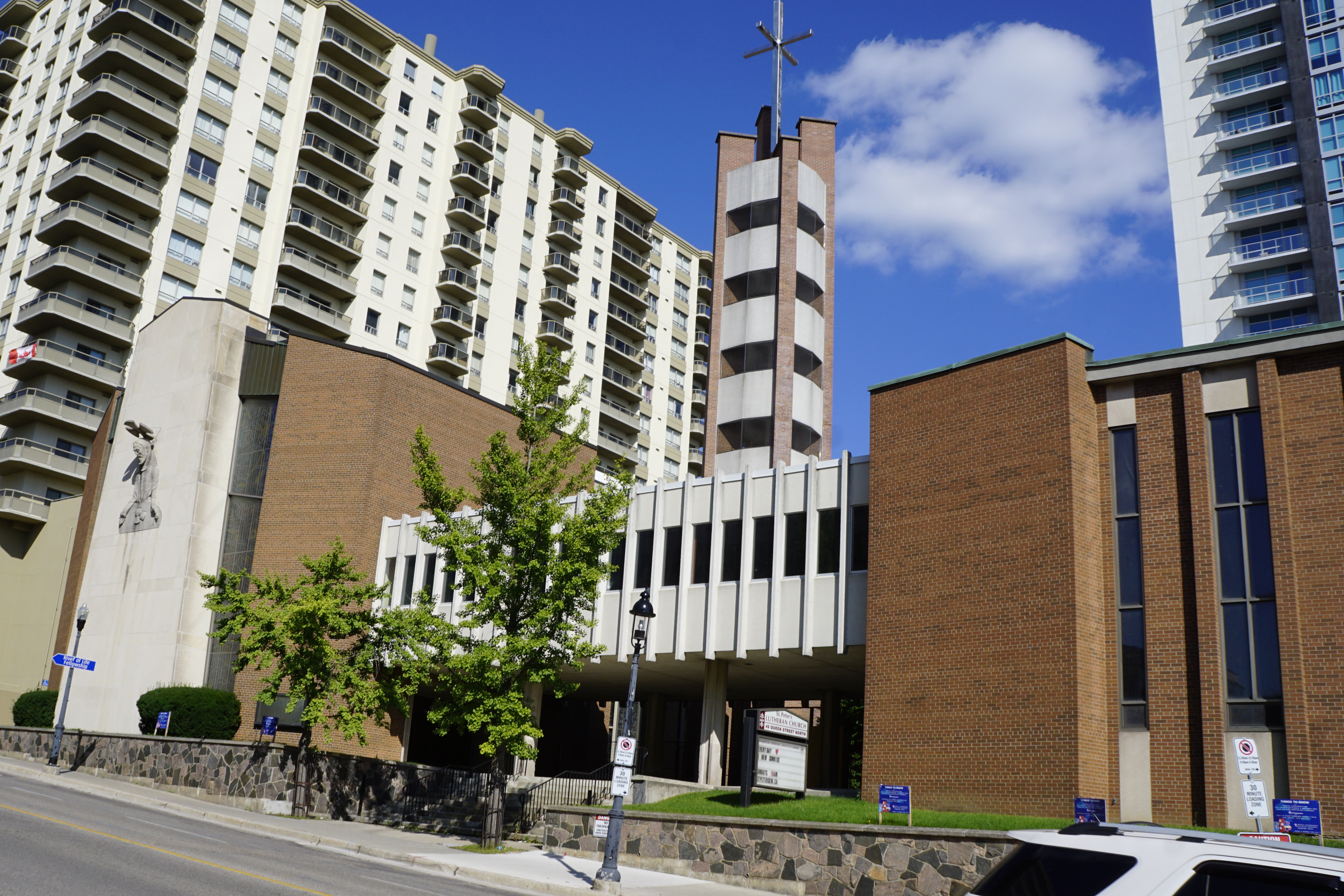
St. Peter's Lutheran Church in Kitchener

The Eastern Synod is one of five synods of the Evangelical Lutheran Church in Canada, consisting of 50,000 baptized members in 175 congregations. The territory of the Eastern Synod runs from Sault Ste. Marie, Ontario to Halifax, Nova Scotia. Their office is located in Kitchener, Ontario. Their Bishop is Rev. Carla Blakley. The Eastern Synod consists of 175 congregations and approximately 50,000 baptized members. The Eastern Synod Office is located in Kitchener, Ontario.

The Eastern Synod benefits from a strong partnership with Martin Luther University College, Canadian Lutheran World Relief, Lutheran World Federation, the Canadian Council of Churches as well as the World Council of Churches. The Eastern Synod is a strong participant in the Full Communion relationship between the Evangelical Lutheran Church in Canada and the Anglican Church in Canada.

As of 2022, the Eastern Synod has several portfolios and committees to address issues such as Racial Justice, Reconciliation, Environmental Justice, Mission, Youth and Young Adult Ministry and Congregational Redevelopment.
