= John Wardlaw Paxton =

John Wardlaw Paxton (December 13, 1866 – December 21, 1934) was an American Presbyterian missionary and doctor in China, known for providing medical care and education. Supported by his community in Danville, Virginia, Paxton's mission started in 1892 and lasted over thirty years. He worked through the Boxer Rebellion when the country experienced increasing anti-foreign sentiment. His work incorporated Western medicine in his missionary outreach in East Asia.

== Early life ==
Paxton was born on December 13, 1866, in Danville, Virginia, to William Coalter Paxton and Harriet Ware Paxton. Paxton's grandfather, John W. Paxton, was one of the town's founders and a silversmith. His family fostered an atmosphere of civic engagement and religious commitment.

== Education ==
He studied at the Union Theological Seminary in Richmond, Virginia from 1899-1900. He did not receive a degree.

=== Marriage and Family ===
In 1898 Paxton married Una Edith Hall in China. Hall was part of a mission from Illinois, who shared his dedication to service. They had two children, John Hall Paxton and, by adoption, Virginia Ware Paxton.

== Career ==
In 1892 Paxton left for Shanghai, China as part of a Presbyterian mission. The late 1800s was a time of increased foreign missionary activity in China with efforts to spread Christianity and address societal needs like education and healthcare. Paxton and his wife included medical assistance with their spiritual mission. Paxton took on learning the Chinese language. His fluency helped build trust among the communities he worked with. As a trusted community member he could perform medical services ranging from treating illnesses to surgeries as well as emparting basic hygiene practices.

Together their mission faced a crossroads during the Boxer Rebellion in 1900. There was a nationalist uprising that targeted missionaries and Chinese Christian converts. This violent movement resulted in the deaths of many missionaries, but the Paxton family survived. They temporarily returned to the United States, where Paxton shared his experiences with congregations across the South. While back in the US, he served as a pastor at the First Presbyterian Church of Wilmington, North Carolina and as a supply pastor at First Presbyterian Church of Selma, Alabama.

Paxton and his family returned to Shanghai the following year. They resumed their work in a challenging political environment. The Qing Dynasty fell in 1912 and the establishment of the Republic of China was established.

Absalom Sydenstricker and his wife were other missionaries influenced by the Paxtons service and commitment. Their daughter, Pearl S. Buck, was also influenced by these ideals.

During their 35-year tenure in China, the Paxtons experienced waves of societal change. By 1927 escalating tensions and revolutionary turmoil forced them to leave China permanently. They returned to Danville where Paxton became an advocate for cross-cultural missions.
