= North American Baptist Conference =

Association of Baptists

- Abbreviation: NAB
- Classification: Protestant
- Orientation: Baptist
- Theology: Evangelical
- Polity: Congregational
- Region: United States
- Origin: 1851
- Official website: nabconference.org

North American Baptist Conference (NAB) is a Baptist Christian denomination in the United States and in Canada. It is affiliated with the Baptist World Alliance. The headquarters is in Roseville, California.

== History ==
The roots of the NAB go back to 1839, when Konrad Anton Fleischmann began work in New Jersey and Pennsylvania with German immigrants. Fleischmann was a Swiss separatist and held to believer's baptism and regenerate church membership. In 1843, the first German Baptist Church was organized in the city of Philadelphia, Pennsylvania. This was the oldest church affiliated with the North American Baptist Conference. German Baptist Churches were organized in Illinois, Missouri, New York, Ontario, and Wisconsin in the 1840s and early 1850s. The churches organized a conference in 1851 in Philadelphia, named the "Conference of Ministers and Helpers of German Churches of Baptized Christians, usually called Baptists." Another conference was formed in 1859 in Springfield, Illinois. The first German Baptist church in Canada was established by August Rauschenbusch in Ontario in 1851. The General Conference of German Baptist Churches in North America was formed in 1865 at Wilmot, Ontario, and meets every three years for fellowship and to conduct business. The Conference has changed from originally being German-language churches to primarily using the English language. The Conference adopted its present title in 1944, removing the reference to its ethnic identity. In 1970 the form of organization of the North American Baptist Conference was restructured into 21 smaller units called "Associations."

According to a census published by the association in 2023, it claimed 53,000 members and 405 churches.

== Schools ==
It has two schools - the Kairos University in Sioux Falls, South Dakota in the United States and Taylor College and Seminary in Edmonton, Alberta in Canada.

== See also ==
- Baptists in Canada
- Baptists in the United States
- Converge, formerly the Baptist General Conference (BGC)
