= Kairos University =

Theological university in Sioux Falls, South Dakota, US

Coordinates: 43°31′32″N 96°44′09″W

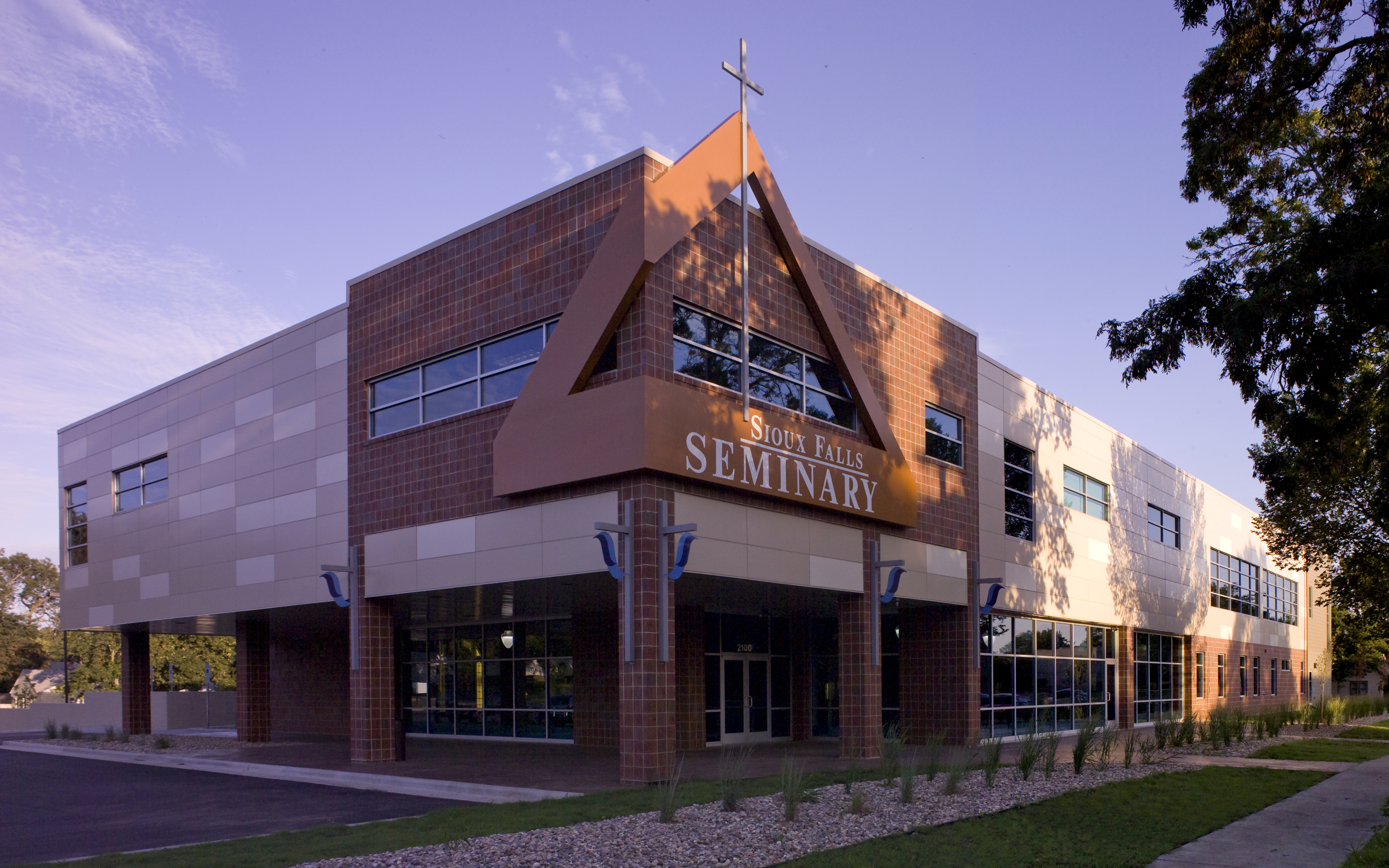
Kairos University headquarters and former Sioux Falls Seminary Campus

Kairos University is a private theological university headquartered in Sioux Falls, South Dakota, United States. It is both a higher education institution and the institutional hub of a global theological education network, connecting partner schools and ministries in a collaborative system of competency-based theological education (CBTE). The university traces its origins to 1858. In its present form, Kairos includes five legacy partner institutions, with Sioux Falls Seminary—the accredited entity—being renamed Kairos University in 2021. While interdenominational in scope, Kairos retains an affiliation with the North American Baptist Conference.

== History ==
The university was renamed Kairos University in 2021, following the successful integration of its legacy partner institutions:

- Sioux Falls seminary
- Taylor Seminary
- Evangelical Seminary
- BLI School of Ministry
- Houston Graduate School of Theology

=== Origins and development of Kairos University ===
The institution traces its origins to the midst of the 19th century when the Sioux Falls seminary was founded in 1858 (168 years ago) in Rochester, New York, and was known as the German Department of the Rochester Theological Seminary. Its purpose was to train pastors for German-speaking people in North America. In 1931, the seminary became known as the German Baptist Seminary, and in 1945, it changed its name to North American Baptist Seminary. In 1949, the seminary relocated to Sioux Falls, South Dakota, in order to be more centrally located to its constituents. The name was changed from North American Baptist Seminary to Sioux Falls Seminary on May 18, 2007. In July 2009, the seminary moved into a new, environmentally friendly campus in central Sioux Falls, nestled on the eastern edge of the Augustana University campus.

In 2014, Sioux Falls Seminary launched the Kairos Project, a competency-based theological education (CBTE) initiative inviting collaborative theological institutions to join a new network.

Legacy Partnerships were formed through teach-out agreements under which partner schools phased out their accredited programs, transferred students and core faculty into the Kairos Project, and ceased operating independently—while retaining their heritage as sub-brands ("dba") and schools of Kairos. Legacy partner programs, such as the MA in Marriage and Family Therapy and ThD from Evangelical Seminary, and the Doctor of Professional Counseling from Houston Graduate School of Theology, were incorporated into Kairos’s accredited offerings.

Seven years later, Sioux Falls Seminary officially became Kairos University, a change reflected in its charter and accreditation documentation. As the umbrella institution, Kairos University remains the sole accredited degree-granting body, while retaining its collaborative ethos and continuing to deepen global partnerships with legacy and contextual partners.

== Academics ==
The university is accredited by the Higher Learning Commission (HLC) and the Commission on Accrediting of the Association of Theological Schools (ATS). Kairos grants degrees from the bachelor’s through doctoral levels.

Kairos University offers a range of programs built on competency-based theological education, emphasizing integrated knowing and demonstrated proficiency of defined outcomes through mentoring, contextual learning, and flexible pacing. Some programs like the PhD are also offered through classic structures. Each of the university's programs integrates areas such as Bible, theology, ministry practice, leadership, counseling, and theological research.

It is one of the few universities to offer a Doctor of Professional Counseling (DPC) degree, the other being Mississippi College. The DPC is similar to the professional practice doctorates found in other social science disciplines such as those in the social work profession (Doctor of Social Work degree). As all 50 US states license Professional Counselors following the earning of a master's degree and passing the required examinations, no additional license is granted to DPC graduates.

== Partnerships and locations ==
In addition to its main campus in Sioux Falls, Kairos has further offices in the United States and Canada, and operates through a network of partner seminaries, colleges, and ministry organizations across the United States, Canada, and internationally. These include institutions such as the St. Stephen's University in Canada, Theologisches Seminar Rheinland (Rhineland School of Theology) near Cologne/Germany, and theological schools in Africa and Asia. Kairos University in Sioux Falls should not be confused with the Kairos Pacific University in Tustin, California, or Kairos University (Florida), a separate religious training school with lower accreditation status.

== Studies on Kairos University and CBTE ==
Independent scholars and organizations have studied Kairos University’s competency-based theological education (CBTE) programs. In his comprehensive study on competency-based education, Students First (Harvard Education Press), Paul LeBlanc described Kairos as a pioneer and leading example of CBTE, noting that it has redefined seminary training through its networked and personalized model.

In a comparative case study, the Association of Theological Schools in the United States and Canada has profiled Sioux Falls Seminary/Kairos University as an early adopter of CBTE, highlighting it as the institution that "instituted the most institutionally comprehensive redevelopment” among participating schools.

Kairos University’s model has been studied and contextually reflected internationally. Based on the available data, the institution claims that since the launch of the Kairos Project in 2014, it has become “one of the largest and most diverse accredited systems of competency-based theological education in the world.”

== Publications ==
Kairos University and its leaders have contributed significantly to the literature on CBTE. President Greg Henson and theologian Kenton Anderson co-authored Theological Education: Principles and Practices of a Competency-Based Approach (2024). The institution has also produced a series of white papers outlining its principles, practices, and community-based model of education.
