= Phyllis Trible =

Feminist biblical scholar (1932–2025)

- Born: Phyllis Lou Trible; October 25, 1932; Richmond, Virginia, U.S.
- Died: October 17, 2025 (aged 92); New York City, New York, U.S.

Academic background
- Education: Meredith College; Union Theological Seminary
- Doctoral advisor: James Muilenburg

Academic work
- Discipline: Biblical studies
- Sub-discipline: Old Testament studies
- School or tradition: Christian feminism
- Institutions: Wake Forest University; Andover Newton Theological School; Union Theological Seminary

Phyllis Lou Trible (October 25, 1932 – October 17, 2025) was an American feminist biblical scholar from Richmond, Virginia. Trible's scholarship focused on the Hebrew Bible and she was noted for her prominent influence on feminist biblical interpretation. Trible wrote a multitude of books on interpretation of the Hebrew Bible, and lectured around the world, including the United States, New Zealand, Australia, Japan, Canada, and a number of countries in Europe.

== Biography ==
Phyllis Lou Trible was born in Richmond, Virginia, Trible received her bachelor's degree at Meredith College in Raleigh, North Carolina, in 1954, and her doctoral degree from Union Theological Seminary in 1963. She wrote her doctoral dissertation at Union under James Muilenburg, who had generated a method of studying the Hebrew Bible based on form criticism that became known as rhetorical criticism, and whose approach Trible developed and applied throughout her career, adding her own pioneering Christian feminist perspective to biblical scholarship.

Trible taught at Wake Forest University (1963–1971) and Andover Newton Theological School (1971–1979) before returning to Union Seminary, where she was appointed the Baldwin Professor of Sacred Literature in 1980. She left Union in 1998 to become Associate Dean and Professor of Biblical Studies of the then-new Wake Forest University School of Divinity in Winston-Salem, North Carolina. She served in those roles until 2001, when she was appointed University Professor at Wake Forest, and served in that role until she retired in 2012.

Trible served as president of the Society of Biblical Literature in 1994. Athalya Brenner named her one of the "prominent matriarchs of contemporary feminist bible criticism," and claimed that Trible's 1973 article "Depatriarchalizing in Biblical Interpretation" ought to "be considered as the honoured mother of feminist Song of Songs scholarship." According to John J. Collins, "Phyllis Trible, more than any other scholar, put feminist criticism on the agenda of biblical scholarship in the 1970s."

In 1998, Trible donated her papers to The Burke Library's Archives of Women in Theological Scholarship at Columbia University; her papers formed the foundation of the collection. In recent years, Trible served as a Visiting Professor of Old Testament at Union Theological Seminary in New York City. She taught a class in the fall of 2018 called "Entrances to Exodus." She received honorary degrees from Franklin College, Lehigh University, Meredith College and Wake Forest University.

Trible died on October 17, 2025 at a hospital in New York City at the age of 92.

== Major themes ==
Trible's work was based on rhetorical criticism, examining the interpretation of biblical texts. She was known for her analysis of biblical narratives, particularly with regard to gender. According to P.K. Tull, there were two major themes that are central to all of her work: her respect for biblical text, and her commitment to equality for women. Her Texts of Terror (1984) provided what Barbara Thiede and Johanna Stiebert call a “clarion call for change,” as Trible explored four biblical texts and argued for reading “on behalf” of victims.

Phyllis Trible's interpretation of the creation of Adam and Eve was one of her most notable works. A major theme within Depatriarchalizing in Biblical Interpretation is Trible's argument that the Bible has existed in a sexist context for centuries, which has distorted interpretations of the text. Trible writes that the Bible, when read against the contemporary patriarchal context, can be liberating for women. Another major takeaway from Trible's most notable work is her agreement with some ancient Jewish Talmudists that—when analyzed using rhetorical criticism—language in the Bible suggests that Adam is androgynous until the female Eve is created. This understanding was a part of traditional Jewish Biblical exegesis going back to 300-500 C.E., and including Judaism's leading historical Biblical exegete, Rashi (1040-1105).

== Criticism ==
John J. Collins said in a response to Trible's work that interpreting a text without the cultural context that it lives in may not even be possible.

Ann M. Vater said that "central figures always bear some cultural heritage."

Michael Carden, looking at who is left out in Trible's advocacy for traditionally oppressed peoples in Christianity, said that in Texts of Terror, Trible fails to explain the treatment of homosexuals in Genesis 19.

Dianne Bergant said that Trible's readings come from a contemporary point of view, and that the idea of an androgynous Adam seeks to solve gender parity, and does not actually look at what is written in the text.

== Bibliography ==
Selected articles

- Trible, Phyllis (1973). "Depatriarchalizing in Biblical Interpretation". Journal of the American Academy of Religion. 41 (1): 30–48. doi:10.1093/jaarel/XLI.1.30. JSTOR 1461386.
- Trible, Phyllis (1975). "Wisdom Builds a Poem: The Architecture of Proverbs 1:20-33". Journal of Biblical Literature. 94 (4): 509–518. doi:10.2307/3265433. JSTOR 3265433.
- Trible, Phyllis (1976). "Two Women in a Man's World: A Reading of the Book of Ruth". Soundings: An Interdisciplinary Journal. 59 (3): 251–279. JSTOR 41177998.
- Trible, Phyllis (1987). "A Daughter's Death: Literary Criticism, Feminism, and the Bible". In O'Connor, Michael Patrick; Freedman, David Noel (eds.). Backgrounds for the Bible. Winona Lake, Ind.: Eisenbrauns. pp. 1–14. ISBN 978-0931464300. OCLC 869179345.
- Trible, Phyllis (1991). "The Bible in Bloom". The Iowa Review. 21 (3): 19–32. doi:10.17077/0021-065X.4046. JSTOR 20153165.
- Trible, Phyllis (1995). "Exegesis for Storytellers and Other Strangers". Journal of Biblical Literature. 114 (1): 3–19. doi:10.2307/3266587. JSTOR 3266587. S2CID 165869391.

Books

- Trible, Phyllis (1978). God and the rhetoric of sexuality (1st ed.). Philadelphia: Fortress Press. ISBN 0800604644.
- Trible, Phyllis (1984). Texts of terror : literary-feminist readings of Biblical narratives (2. pr ed.). Philadelphia: Fortress Press. ISBN 978-0800615376.
- Phyllis, Trible (1994). Rhetorical criticism : context, method, and the book of Jonah. Fortress Press. ISBN 9780800627980.
- Trible, Phyllis; Letty M., Russell, eds. (2006). Hagar, Sarah, and Their Children: Jewish, Christian, and Muslim Perspectives. Philadelphia: Presbyterian Publishing Corporation. ISBN 9780664229825.

Professional and academic associations
Preceded by Victor P. Furnish	President of the Society of Biblical Literature; 1994	Succeeded by Leander E. Keck
