= V. Neil Wyrick =

Victor Neil Wyrick Jr. (September 23, 1928 in Norfolk, Virginia-December 17, 2017) was a minister in the Presbyterian Church (USA), and is perhaps best known for the annual Easter pageant held in Miami's Orange Bowl during the 1960s, and for his extensive writing.

== Life ==
Wyrick was born in Norfolk, Virginia on September 23, 1928. He graduated from Hampden-Sydney College in 1950, and from Union Presbyterian Seminary in Virginia in 1954. He was ordained in 1954. His first pastorate included four rural congregations in Virginia. From 1955 until 1967 Wyrick served as the pastor of a fast-growing Palmetto Presbyterian Church in Miami, Florida. In 1968, he began devoting himself full-time to the evangelistic work of the Presbyterian Churches of Miami, focusing mostly on the Pageantry, Inc, which he founded. In 1994 he began serving the Sunrise Presbyterian Church of Miami, Florida, serving as Associate Pastor until he became the interim pastor of the First Presbyterian Church of Miami in 2000. His appointment coincided with about half the congregation leaving, and was meant to turn away from the outreach to African-Americans and Hispanics and introduction of drums and guitars of his predecessor Michael Girolimon. Sunday worship under Girolimon had been an average of 160, it fell to 44 under Wyrick as of 2004.

Wyrick authored hundreds of articles for national magazines such as the Saturday Evening Post, American Home, Every Woman's Family Circle and others. For several years he had a newspaper column entitled Hints for the Hearthstone and for 20 years a column entitled The Why of it All. He also had a newspaper column entitled Senior Snippets. He was a talk show host for the CBS affiliate in Miami, Florida, (Family Line and Rap Around). He wrote a nationally syndicated radio show, A Boy Called Dysmas. Wryick wrote, produced and acted in a number of one-man dramas, portraying characters from American history, church history and the Bible.

== Written works ==
Wyrick's books include:

- "One-A-Day, Your Spiritual Vitamins" 1962
- "Boundaries Unlimited" 1965
- "I AM" 1966
- "Poor Richard's Almanack for the 20th Century" 1984
- "Rust on My Soul" 1985
- "Letters To America" 1992
- "The Spiritual Abraham Lincoln" 2004
