= Brian Blount =

American biblical scholar

The Reverend Doctor Brian Blount
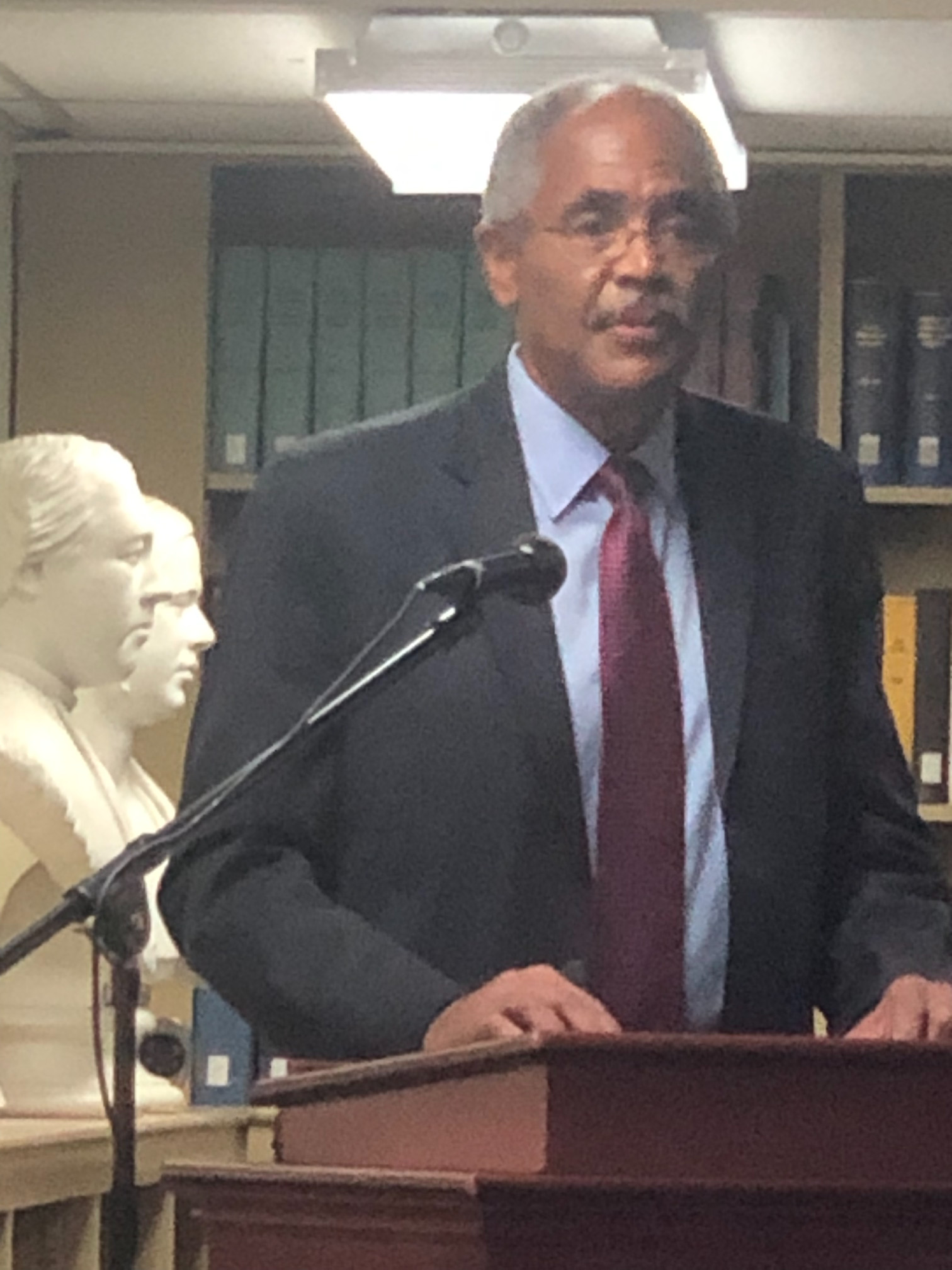
- Born: Brian Blount; Smithfield, Virginia, US

Ecclesiastical career
- Religion: Christianity
- Church: United Presbyterian Church in the United States of America; Presbyterian Church (USA)

Academic background
- Education: College of William and Mary; Princeton Theological Seminary; Emory University

Academic work
- Discipline: Theology
- Sub-discipline: New Testament
- Institutions: Princeton Theological Seminary; Union Presbyterian Seminary

Brian K. Blount (born in Smithfield, Virginia) is a Presbyterian minister, New Testament scholar and past President of Union Presbyterian Seminary. He is a preacher and scholar on the Book of Revelation.

== Education ==
He holds a B.A. from the College of William and Mary, his M. Div from Princeton Theological Seminary, and a Ph.D. from Emory University.

== Ministry career ==
He served as pastor of Carver Memorial Presbyterian Church in Newport News, Virginia, from 1982 to 1988, before studying for his doctorate. He served as the Richard J. Dearborne Professor of New Testament Interpretation at Princeton Theological Seminary for 15 years before being called as President of Union Presbyterian Seminary in Richmond, Virginia in 2007. He retired as President of Union Presbyterian Seminary on June 30, 2023.

== Other publications ==
Blount is a contributor to The Christian Century.

== Written works ==
- Invasion of the Dead: Preaching Resurrection, Westminster John Knox Press, 2014
- Revelation, Westminster John Knox Press, 2009
- The New Interpreter's Dictionary of the Bible, associate editor, Abingdon Press, 2007
- True to Our Native Land: An African American New Testament Commentary, general editor, Fortress Press, 2007
- Can I Get A Witness? Reading Revelation Through African-American Culture, Westminster John Knox Press, 2005
- Preaching Mark in Two Voices, with Gary Charles, Westminster John Knox Press, 2002
- Struggling with Scripture, with Walter Brueggemann and William Placher, Westminster John Knox Press, 2002
- Then The Whisper Put On Flesh: New Testament Ethics in An African American Context, Abingdon Press, 2001
- Making Room At The Table: An Invitation to Multicultural Worship, edited with Lenora Tubbs Tisdale, Westminster John Knox Press, 2000
- Go Preach! Mark's Kingdom Message and The Black Church Today, Orbis Press, 1998
- Cultural Interpretation: Reorienting New Testament Criticism, Fortress Press, 1995

== Sources ==
- Brian Blount, Biographical Information, Union Theological Seminary & Presbyterian School of Christian Education, 2009
