= Taylor College and Seminary =

Baptist university in Alberta, Canada

- Former names: Christian Training Institute; North American Baptist College; Edmonton Baptist Seminary
- Motto: Pro Deo et Veritate
- Motto in English: For God and Truth
- Type: Private university and seminary
- Established: 1940
- Parent institution: Kairos University
- Affiliations: ATS; Association for Biblical Higher Education
- Religious affiliation: North American Baptist Conference
- President: David Williams
- Faculty: 5
- Administrative staff: 10
- Students: 120
- Location: Edmonton, Alberta, Canada; 53.4528°N 113.5280°W
- Campus: Suburban
- Colours: Blue; white
- Website: www.taylor-edu.ca

Taylor College and Seminary is a private Baptist university and seminary in Edmonton, Alberta, Canada. It is part of Kairos University. It is also affiliated with the North American Baptist Conference.

== History ==
The college was established in 1940 as the Christian Training Institute. In 1949 the school became affiliated to the North American Baptist Conference. It was accredited by the Department of Education of Alberta in 1952. A divinity school was added in 1958.

The institution moved from its original location near the U of A to its present location on 23 Avenue in 1968. With the help of the alumni association, a 28-acre campus was purchased, and a major building program was carried out in 1968, including an administration building, two dormitories and the Student Union Building, at a cost of over $1,000,000. The institute was renamed North American Baptist College and endorsed by the Accrediting Association of Bible Colleges the same year. On July 29, 1988, the college signed an affiliation agreement with the University of Alberta, which remained in place for a number of years.

An accredited "university college" began offering undergraduate programs in 2002, and the school changed its name to Taylor University College and Seminary. The undergraduate programs were ended in June 2009. Taylor Seminary continues to operate, and the E P Wahl Centre began offering non-credit educational programs in 2008–2009; a Conservatory of Music was added in 2010.

In 2010, a large portion of the campus was sold and is now home to CDI College.

In 2021, Taylor Seminary became a founding member of the university network Kairos University. As part of Kairos, it is also accredited by the Association of Theological Schools in the United States and Canada.

== Academics ==
Taylor Seminary offers the Master of Divinity, Master of Theological Studies, Master of Arts, and several diplomas and certificates.

== See also ==
- List of universities and colleges in Alberta
- List of evangelical seminaries and theological colleges
