= Martin Luther University College =

Lutheran seminary in Waterloo, Canada

- Former name: Waterloo Lutheran Seminary
- Type: Federated university college
- Established: 1911
- Affiliations: ATS, CUSID
- Religious affiliation: Evangelical Lutheran Church in Canada
- Academic affiliations: Wilfrid Laurier University
- Dean: Kristine Lund
- Academic staff: 13
- Students: 152
- Undergraduates: 9
- Postgraduates: 95
- Doctoral students: 37
- Other students: 11
- Location: 75 University Ave. W, Waterloo, Ontario, N2L 3C5, Canada; 43°28′19″N 80°31′44″W
- Campus: Urban
- Website: luther.wlu.ca

Martin Luther University College, formerly Waterloo Lutheran Seminary, is a seminary of the Evangelical Lutheran Church in Canada federated with Wilfrid Laurier University, located in Waterloo, Ontario.

== History ==
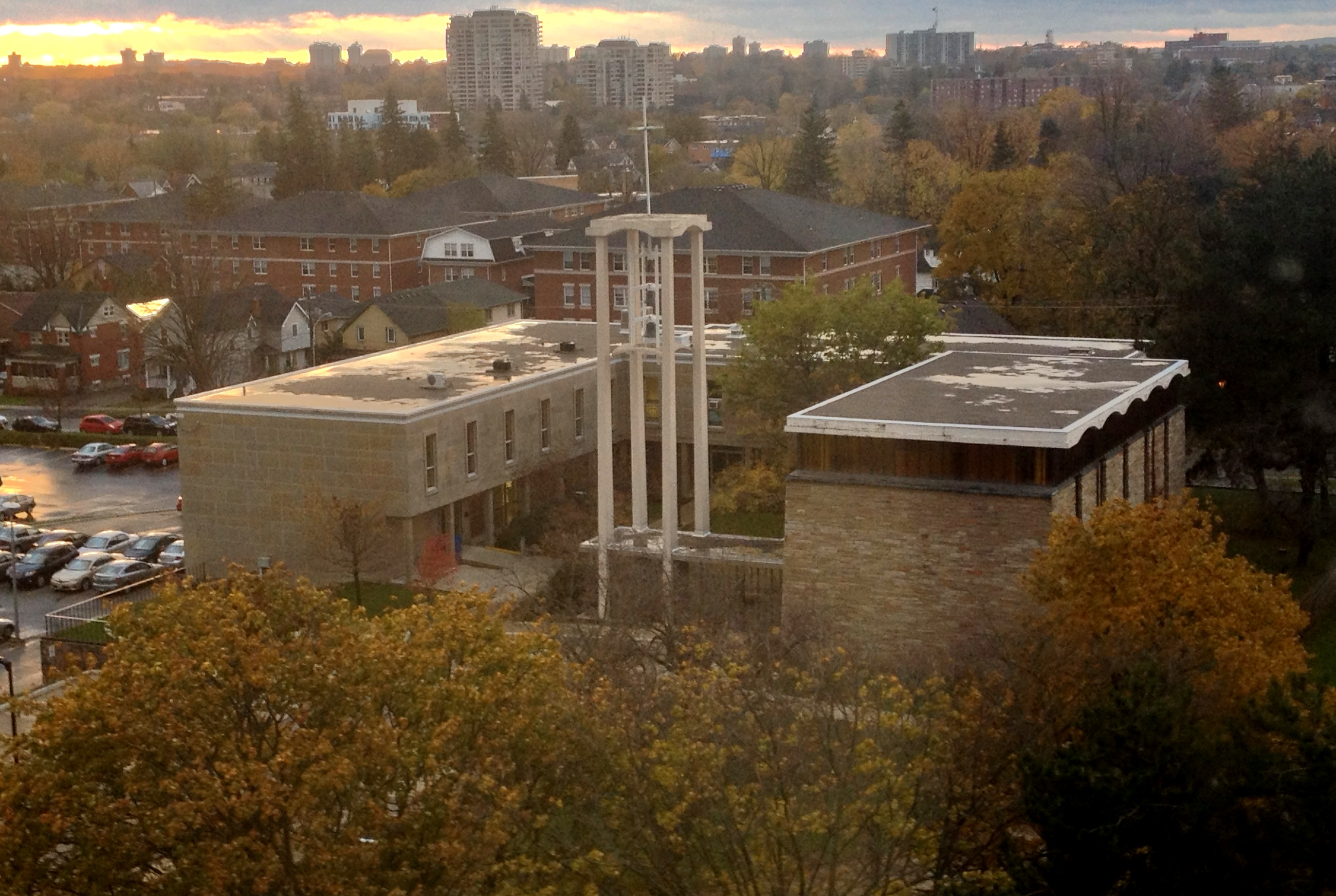
The college building as seen from the Wilfrid Laurier University Library in 2013

In 1911, the Evangelical Lutheran Theological Seminary of Eastern Canada opened its doors to students. Waterloo was selected as the location of the seminary for two main reasons, the first being that land was offered by the citizens of Waterloo on the edge of town, and the second being that most of the Lutherans in Canada resided in the Waterloo and Berlin (now known as Kitchener) area.

In 1914 the Seminary developed non-theological courses under the name of the Waterloo College School. In 1924 the Waterloo College of Arts was established, offering post-secondary three-year programs. In 1925 the Faculty of Arts, under the name of Waterloo College, affiliated with the University of Western Ontario.

The Waterloo College Associate Faculties (WCAF), a semi-autonomous entity within Waterloo College focused on cooperative education in applied sciences, was conceived in the 1950s by the college's president Gerald Hagey. WCAF accepted its first students in 1957, and formally split from Waterloo College in 1959 to become the University of Waterloo. In 1960, Waterloo College ended its affiliation with Western and became a university in its own right: Waterloo Lutheran University.

As a church-affiliated institution, Waterloo Lutheran was ineligible for capital funding from the province, and the Lutheran church was in no position to invest heavily in the university. On November 1, 1973, Waterloo Lutheran University dropped its church affiliation and became the secular, public Wilfrid Laurier University. Theological courses continued to be offered by the Waterloo Lutheran Seminary, which federated with the public university. Today Wilfrid Laurier University emphasizes liberal arts while the University of Waterloo emphasises science and engineering.

Waterloo Lutheran Seminary renamed itself to Martin Luther University College, with an announcement at the Eastern Synod Assembly in Toronto on Saturday, June 23, 2018. The school (Luther, for short) continues to be federated with Laurier.

== Programs ==
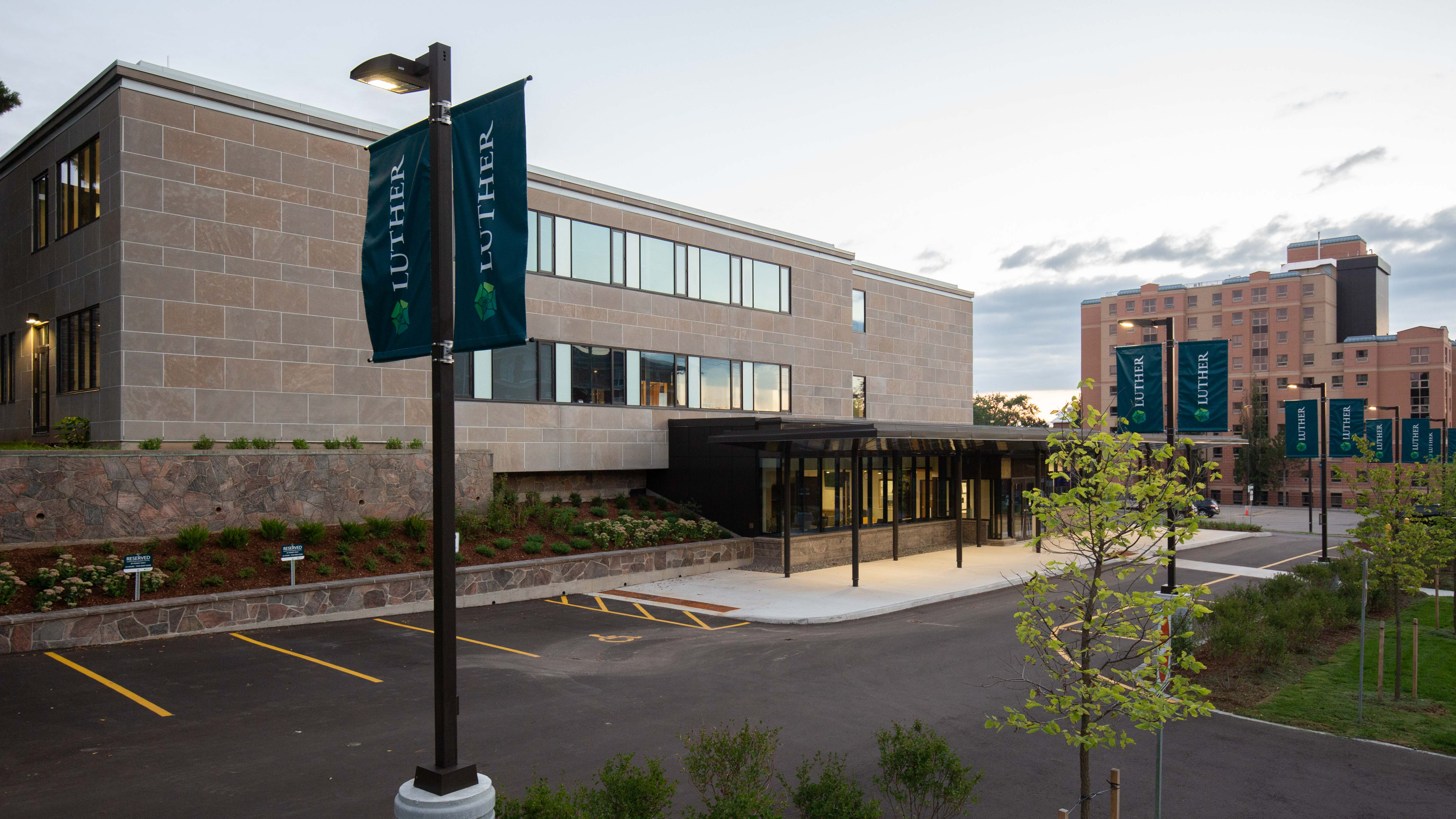
The entrance to the college

Theological Education

Martin Luther University College offers Master of Divinity program for people preparing for the ministry in a variety of churches and Master of Arts in Theology program in two fields: Public Faith and Spirituality, and Spiritual Care and Psychotherapy. Spiritual Care and Psychotherapy is the largest program, and prepares people to work in clinical settings such as counselling agencies. Individuals studying for the diaconal ministry of the ELCIC can pursue the Public Faith and Spirituality field.

- Bachelor of Arts (BA) in Christian Studies and Global Citizenship
- Master of Divinity (M.Div.)
- Master of Arts (MA) in Theology: Public Faith and Spirituality
- Doctor of Philosophy (Ph.D.) in Human Relationships: Pastoral Leadership

Spiritual Care and Psychotherapy (counselling)

The Seminary offers non-denominational graduate counselling programs within their Spiritual Care and Psychotherapy program stream. Spiritual Care and Psychotherapy is a unique form of therapy which uses spiritual resources as well as psychological understanding for healing and growth. It is provided by mental health professionals with in-depth spiritual, religious and theological education. Drawing on spiritual and religious resources, chaplains and counsellors assist persons who are struggling with depression, grief, marital and family conflict, substance abuse and other issues. They also work with those persons who are seeking something more from their lives. Graduate programs in Spiritual Care and Psychotherapy:

- Master of Arts (MA) in Theology: Spiritual Care and Psychotherapy
- Doctor of Philosophy (Ph.D.) in Human Relationships: Spiritual Care and Psychotherapy
- Graduate Diploma in Spiritual Care and Psychotherapy

== Partnerships ==
The Seminary offers the most extensive selection of Pastoral Counselling programs in Canada and graduates have been accredited by American Association for Marriage and Family Therapy and the Canadian Association for Pastoral Practice and Education. WLS also offers a lecture series open to the community and continuing education programs. The school is a member of the Association of Theological Schools in the United States and Canada.
