= Kathy Dawson =

Kathy L Dawson is a certified Christian educator and ordained minister in the Presbyterian Church (U.S.A.). Her work is focused primarily on the development of educational resources and the accessibility of resources for all educators. In 2015, she was recognized as the Educator of the Year by the Association of Presbyterian Church Educators. She is currently the Benton Family Associate Professor of Christian Education at Columbia Theological Seminary.

== Career ==
Dawson a B.A. from California State University, Long Beach (1981), a M.A. in Christian Education and became a certified Christian Educator at Presbyterian School of Christian Education (1992), a M.Div from Columbia Theological Seminary (1994) and a Ph.D. from Princeton Theological Seminary (2002). She began her career as a teacher in Los Alamitos and Palm Springs Unified School Districts (1981-1990) where she was voted Teacher of the Year in 1990. She was ordained in the Presbyterian Church (U.S.A.) in 1994 and began working in the church. Dawson served as the Interim Director of Christian Education at Shallowford Presbyterian Church (1992-1994) and Associate Pastor for Christian Education and Youth Coordination at Spring Hills Presbyterian Church (1994-1997). Since then she has been invited and taught faith curriculum and development at many churches across the country. Her work includes serving as the Editor/Consultant on "We Believe" Children’s Curriculum in its initial stages for the Presbyterian Church (USA). She also serves on the Educator Certification Committee of the Presbyterian Church (U.S.A.).

Dawson began teaching while a doctoral student at Princeton Theological Seminary (1998-2001) where she was a teaching fellow and guest lecturer. She served at Union Presbyterian Seminary as the Assistant Professor of Christian Education for Children and Youth (2001-2004) and is currently at Columbia Theological Seminary where she is now the Benton Family Associate Professor of Christian Education. She also plays an integral role in developing the doctorate of educational ministry degree at Columbia, which is the only mainline Protestant institution to offer this program.

== Thought ==
Dawson work has largely focused on children and youth education, but has emphasized the importance of inter-generational relationships as well. She advocates for the understanding of development over the course of a lifetime in order to develop specific educational resources. Within this focus she has done research on both the creation of resources and the methods of teaching. This is apparent throughout her publications in various articles and books.

One area of importance for Dawson is the availability of resources for all Christian educators. She believes there is a lack of accessibility and opportunity for many to use these educational materials. In an effort to support her cause she created and moderates the resource sharing website, Hope4CE. In this project she hopes to allow Christian educators from all over the world to have access to a variety of different materials.

== Works ==
- Sticky Learning: How Neuroscience Supports Teaching That's Remembered, with Holly J. Inglis (Author) and Rodger Y. Nishioka (Contributor), Fortress Press, 2014.
- We Believe, curriculum resource, Multi-age, 2003, and portions of Preschool, 2003-2004, Presbyterian Church (USA).
- We Believe:Songs for All God’s Children, Compact Disc, Volume 1 and 2, Presbyterian Church (USA), 2003-2004, (producer and director).
- Three Pastoral Perspective Essays for Feasting on the Gospels-Matthew, Louisville:Westminster/John Knox.
- Six Pastoral Perspective Essays for Feasting on the Word, Louisville: Westminster/John Knox Press, 2008-2009.
- "Blooming Where We Are Planted" in From Midterms to Ministry: Practical Theologians on Pastoral Beginnings, edited by Allan Hugh Cole Jr. Grand Rapids: Eerdmans, 2008.
- Confessing Faith: A Guide to Confirmation for Presbyterians. Louisville: Geneva Press, 2006.
- "Reformed Spirits: Christian Practices in Presbyterian Preschools in South Korea and the United States," co-written with Shin-Kyung Park, in Nurturing Child and Adolescent Spirituality: Perspectives from the World’s Religious Traditions, edited by Karen-Marie Yust, Aostre N. Johnson, Sandy Eisenberg Sasso, and Eugene C. Roehlkepartain. Rowman & Littlefield, 2006.
- "Pastoral Care of Children," Encyclopedia of Christianity, Volume 4. Grand Rapids: Eerdmans, 2006.
- "When Does Faith Begin?" in Children Among Us, Cassandra Williams, Louisville: Witherspoon Press, 2003, 25-50.
- The Losin’ Blues. Bermuda Dunes, CA: AfterLoss publications, 1999.
- Bye, Bye...I Love You. Bermuda Dunes, CA: AfterLoss publications, 1998.
- The French Confession of 1559: Study Guide. Louisville: Office of Theology and Worship, Presbyterian Church (USA), 1998.
- Gracie the Fish. Presbyterian Church (U.S.A.) Children and Youth stories for One Great Hour of Sharing, 2016.
