= Mid-America Reformed Seminary =

Christian higher education institution in Indiana

Coordinates: 41.517676°N 87.519323°W

- Dyer, Indiana; USA

Information
- School type: Private
- Established: 1981
- President: Alan D. Strange
- Faculty: 6
- Enrollment: 30
- Campus: Suburban
- Website: Official Website

Mid-America Reformed Seminary is a graduate-level theological institution located in Dyer, Indiana, providing a biblical and theological education in the classic Reformed (Calvinistic) tradition. The seminary offers a three-year Master of Divinity degree program for students seeking ordination. A two-year Master of Theological Studies degree is offered for students who desire a theological education without seeking the ordained ministry.

The school is accredited by TRACS and ATS.

== Relationship to the Church ==
The school is not governed by any particular denomination, thereby allowing it to serve a variety of churches with ministerial training. Throughout its history Mid-America has prepared students for ordained ministry in the following confessionally Reformed and Presbyterian churches:

- Christian Reformed Church in North America (CRCNA)
- Orthodox Presbyterian Church (OPC)
- Presbyterian Church in America (PCA)
- Reformed Church in the United States (RCUS)
- United Reformed Churches in North America (URCNA)

Mid-America's commitment to theological education is based on confessional allegiance rather than denominational affiliation. Most faculty and board members were formerly associated with the Christian Reformed Church but are now affiliated with the United Reformed Churches. Additionally, about a third of the faculty are associated with the Orthodox Presbyterian Church. All members of the faculty and of the Board of Trustees are committed to the Holy Scriptures as the infallible and inerrant Word of God, and in conformity with the Word are committed to the ecumenical creeds of Christendom (the Apostles' Creed, Athanasian Creed, and Nicene Creed) and the Reformed Confessions (the Belgic Confession, the Heidelberg Catechism, the Canons of Dort, and the Westminster Confession of Faith) as faithfully setting forth the system of truth taught in Scripture.

== History ==
The seminary was founded on April 21, 1981, when a group of Christian Reformed ministers and laymen met at the Hilton Hotel at O'Hare International Airport in Chicago. At this meeting, it was decided to establish a seminary society and board of trustees, to purchase the Harmony Youth Home in Orange City, Iowa, to serve as the seminary's campus, and to name the seminary Mid-America Reformed Seminary.^{1} The seminary was intended as an alternative to Calvin Theological Seminary, the denominational seminary of the Christian Reformed Church in North America, which the founders of Mid-America believed was straying from its confessional Reformed identity. In 1995 the seminary moved its campus to Dyer, Indiana.

The current school faculty members are Drs. Cornel Venema, J. Mark Beach, Alan Strange, Marcus Mininger, Andrew Compton, and Paul Ipema. Rev. Mark Vander Hart serves as Associate Professor Emeritus of Old Testament Studies.

== Publications ==
- Mid-America Journal of Theology – published annually with scholarly articles and book reviews
- The Messenger – a quarterly newsletter
- Called to Preach – a booklet by Dr. John Sittema written to those considering the gospel ministry

== Notes ==
^1Mid-America E-Notes 24 April 2006.

^2Ibid.
