= Bill J. Leonard =

American historian of religion (born 1946)

Billy Jim Leonard (born 20 March 1946) is an American historian of religion, Baptist pastor, teacher and dean.

== Early life and education ==
Bill Leonard was born on 20 March 1946 in Decatur, Texas to a salesman, Marvin R. Leonard, and his wife Lavelle, who worked as a secretary. He was raised a Baptist. After he turned ten, Leonard moved with his family to Fort Worth, Texas. Leonard earned a Bachelor of Arts degree from Texas Wesleyan College (now (Texas Wesleyan University) in 1968, followed by a Master of Divinity at Southwestern Baptist Theological Seminary in 1971. He then obtained a doctorate at Boston University in 1975. Leonard completed postdoctoral research at Yale University. After his studies, he was ordained minister.

== Ministry ==
Between 1965 and 1972, Leonard was a youth minister at Northridge Baptist Church in Mesquite, Texas. He then led the First Community Church in Southborough, Massachusetts from 1971 to 1975.

== Teaching ==
He began teaching at Southern Baptist Theological Seminary in 1975, was appointed William Walker Brookes Professor of American Christianity for 1990 and 1991, then left for Samford University in 1992. Concurrently, Leonard was on the faculty of Berea College between 1989 and 1995, including a stint as dean from 1991 to 1992.

== Dean ==
In May 1996, Leonard was appointed the founding dean of the Wake Forest University School of Divinity. As dean, Leonard expressed support for LGBT students, and the schools inaugural class admitted in 1999 included a lesbian student. He retired as dean effect 30 June 2010, and was succeeded by Gail R. O'Day.

In September 2011, Wake Forest University announced the creation of the James and Marilyn Dunn Chair of Baptist Studies. On 24 January 2012, Leonard formally assumed the named professorship. Since assuming the role, he has spoken at several educational institutions. He delivered Samford University's 2012 Ray Frank Robbins Lecture, the 2015 William James Lecture at Harvard University, as well as the 2017 William L. Self Preaching Lectures hosted by Mercer University's McAfee School of Theology. Leonard retired from teaching in May 2018 and was named Professor of Divinity Emeritus.
