= Thomas David Gordon =

American theologian and academic

Thomas David Gordon (born 1954) (also known as T. David Gordon) is a professor, media ecologist, author, pastor, and Reformed Christian theologian.

Thomas David Gordon was born in Richmond, Virginia in 1954. Gordon received a B.L.A. from Roanoke College, a M.A.R. and Th.M. from Westminster Theological Seminary, and Ph.D. from Union Theological Seminary in Virginia where he wrote a dissertation titled Paul's Understanding of the Law: A Tri-polar Analysis (1984). Gordon served as Professor of New Testament and Greek at Gordon-Conwell Theological Seminary in Massachusetts from 1984 to 1998, and professor of Greek and Religious Studies at Grove City College in Pennsylvania from 1999 to the present. He also served as Pastor in Christ Presbyterian Church, a Presbyterian Church in America congregation in Nashua, New Hampshire, from 1989 to 1998. He has published numerous peer reviewed articles and well-known books including, Why Johnny Can’t Preach: The Media Have Shaped the Messengers (2009) and Why Johnny Can’t Sing Hymns: How Pop Culture Re-Wrote the Hymnal (2010).
