= Saskatoon Theological Union =

Coordinates: 52.1292°N 106.6422°W

The Saskatoon Theologican Union is an alliance of three Protestant theological colleges at the University of Saskatchewan.

- College of Emmanuel and St. Chad (Anglican Church of Canada)
- Lutheran Theological Seminary, Saskatoon (Evangelical Lutheran Church in Canada)
- St. Andrew's College (United Church of Canada)

In 1969 the three colleges came together and created the Graduate Theological Union of Saskatoon; this became known as the Saskatoon Theological Union.

There is a Roman Catholic college at the university, St. Thomas More College, which is not a member of the union.
