= Frances Taylor Gench =

- Occupations: Herbert Worth & Annie H. Jackson Professor of Biblical Interpretation
- Years active: 1986–present
- Theological work
- Language: English
- Tradition or movement: Christian Feminism; Presbyterian; Reformed
- Main interests: New Testament; Pauline Epistles

Frances Taylor Gench is a Presbyterian minister, New Testament scholar, and the Herbert Worth & Annie H. Jackson Professor of Biblical Interpretation at Union Presbyterian Seminary.

== Education ==
Gench earned her B.A. from the Davidson College, and both her M.Div. and Ph.D. from Union Presbyterian Seminary (formerly Union Theological Seminary in Virginia). Her dissertation focused on the Gospel of Matthew and was later published as a monograph under the name Wisdom in the Christology of Matthew.

== Career ==
Gench is ordained in the Presbyterian Church (U.S.A.) and has served as parish associate at New York Avenue Presbyterian Church in Washington, D.C. She has previously served as a member of the Presbyterian Church (U.S.A.) General Assembly's Theological Task Force on Peace, Unity, and Purity of the Church (2001-2006), and has served as a faculty member at Lutheran Theological Seminary at Gettysburg (now a part of United Lutheran Seminary).

During her academic career, Gench has been particularly noteworthy for her work on the New Testament writings attributed to Paul the Apostle. Gench emphasizes the importance of dialogue with "tyrannical texts" in Scripture as well as between theological conservatives and theological liberals. She recommends five guiding principles for addressing difficult biblical texts: "1) remember that the difficult text is worthy of charity from its interpreters; 2) argue with the text, confident that wrestling with scripture is an act of faithfulness; 3) resist the temptation to throw the baby out with the bathwater; 4) learn from the dangers as well as the insights that biblical texts present; 5) don't let anyone tell you that you are not taking the authority of the Bible seriously."

== Publications ==
Gench, Frances Taylor (2004). Back to the Well
