= Donald C. Simmons Jr. =

American historian (born 1963)

- Born: June 26, 1963 (age 63)
- Occupations: author, pastor, filmmaker

Donald C. Simmons Jr. (born June 26, 1963) is an American author and filmmaker who has held numerous elected and appointed political positions during his career. Simmons is a pastor, consultant and contractor. He was also previously with the Omaha Storm Chasers, the Triple-A affiliate of the Kansas City Royals, and the faculty of the University of Nebraska System, Dakota Wesleyan University, and other institutions of higher learning.

== Biography ==
A native of Mississippi, he spent his childhood in Alabama and North Carolina. He is a graduate of the University of Mississippi where he was a member of Sigma Pi fraternity. He received his Ph.D. in History and International Studies in 1994 from the University of Denver, and he holds a Certificate of Ministry from Truett Theological Seminary at Baylor University, and he is pursuing a second doctorate in ministry with a concentration in pastoral care from Houston Graduate School of Theology. His early research interests focused on the displacement of peoples as a result of military conflict and their subsequent emigration to other countries, but in recent years his interests have shifted toward leadership and service. He remains active in missionary programs with the Center for Church and Global Aids, most recently in Kenya in 2012. On October 10, 2010, on the 10th anniversary of his own health crisis, an open heart surgery, he ran and completed the Chicago Marathon to raise funds and awareness for HIV-AIDS in Africa.

From 2001 until 2006, he served as executive director of the South Dakota Humanities Council, and established the South Dakota Center for the Book and the South Dakota Festival of the Book. He was on the faculty of Dakota Wesleyan University from 2006-2013, where he also served as academic dean.

== Books, films and writings ==
He was co-editor of 'Latin America and the Caribbean in Transition (Troy State University Press, 1995) with Robert P. Watson, and co-editor of the textbook Leadership and Service: An Introduction (Kendall/Hunt and Company Publishers, 2008.) with George McGovern and Dan Gaken. He is the author of the book, Confederate Settlements in British Honduras (McFarland and Company Publishers, 2001).

He served on the board of editors of White House Studies from 2005-2011.

Simmons edited and contributed to Latin America and the Caribbean in Transition, and to Robert P. Watson's George McGovern: A Political Life, A Political Legacy,, The Plains Political Tradition: South Dakota Political Culture, co-edited with Jon Lauck and John E. Miller as well as Organizational Leadership: Foundations for Christians (InterVarsity Press, 2014, with John Shoup and Jack Burns.

He has also published a number of newspaper columns in the Mitchell Daily Republic the Mississippi Business Journal and elsewhere, and some poetry. South Dakota Magazine featured poetry by Simmons in its 25th anniversary issue (Jan./Feb 2010), along with Norma Wilson of Vermillion and June Ohm of Redfield. His photography has appeared in Mississippi Magazine, Mississippi: An Illustrated History and a number of newspapers and regional magazines.

== Political career ==
During his time in South Dakota, he was twice elected a city councilman and served as vice chair, while serving on the South Dakota Municipal League's Public Works Committee. Simmons was a member of the Kilian Community College board of trustees from 2005-2006 and the South Dakota Board of Nursing in 2003. Governor Mike Rounds appointed Simmons to the South Dakota State Historical Society Board of Directors in October, 2009.

== Athletic career ==
Simmons was previously with the Omaha Storm Chasers, the Triple-A affiliate of the Kansas City Royals. In July, 2014 Simmons was recognized by the Storm Chasers as the recipient of the outstanding employee award. He also works as an umpire at the college and university level. Previously, Simmons served as academic dean and assistant coach for the Dakota Wesleyan University baseball team from 2010-2013. He was the Tigers’ defensive and strength and conditioning coach. He studied coaching at the United States Sports Academy and is a Level One Certified Coach (NFHS). In 2012 Simmons assisted Steve Gust, DWU's head coach, when Gust served as skipper for the North All-Stars at the U.S. Baseball Championships in Virginia. The game, which featured high school baseball players ages 17 and under from around the United States, was nationally televised on the CBS Sports Network. Simmons is a graduate of the Jim Evans Academy of Professional Umpiring (Florida Clinic). As a dean and faculty member of the College of Leadership and Public Service at DWU, his research related to athletics focused on the role of leadership as it related to organizational dynamics and team building. He has coached many student athletes at a variety of levels and in several sports, including University of Memphis soccer standout Chris Porter.
