= Cornelis Venema =

Cornelis Paul Venema (born 1954), sometimes known as Cornel Venema, is an American Reformed theologian. Before retiring, he served as both President and as a Professor of Doctrinal Studies at Mid-America Reformed Seminary.

Venema studied at Dordt College and Calvin Theological Seminary, before receiving his Ph.D. from Princeton Theological Seminary in 1985. He served as pastor of Ontario Christian Reformed Church in California from 1982 to 1988, when he joined the Mid-America faculty.

Venema specializes in the theology of the Reformation, and has written books on Heinrich Bullinger (Heinrich Bullinger and the Doctrine of Predestination: Author of "The Other Reformed Tradition", 2002) and John Calvin (Accepted and Renewed in Christ: The “Twofold Grace of God” and the Interpretation of Calvin’s Theology, 2007). He has also written on Christian eschatology (The Promise of the Future and Christ and the Future) and the New Perspective on Paul (The Gospel of Free Acceptance in Christ and Getting the Gospel Right: Assessing the Reformation and New Perspectives on Paul).

== Bibliography ==
Venema, Cornelis P., ed. Roots Renewed: Perspectives on the United Reformed Churches in North America (After Thirty Years) Grandville, MI: Reformed Fellowship Inc., 2026.

Venema, Cornelis P. Christ and Covenant Theology: Essays on Election, Republication, and the Covenants. P & R Publishing, 2017.

Venema, Cornelis P., But for the Grace of God: An Exposition on the Canons of Dordt Grandville, MI: Reformed Fellowship Inc., 2011.

Venema, Cornelis P. Children at the Lord’s Table? Assessing the Case for Paedocommunion. Reformation Heritage Books, 2009.

Venema, Cornelis P. The Promise of the Future. Banner of Truth Trust, 2000.
