= Frank M. Yamada =

Japanese-American biblical scholar (born 1966)

Frank M. Yamada (born 1966) is a Japanese-American Old Testament scholar.

== Biography ==
As a third-generation Japanese-American (sansei), Yamada grew up in a predominantly white, upper-middle class suburb of Southern California. Raised in a Buddhist home, he became a Christian at the age of 19. Though he began his undergraduate studies as a pre-med major at the University of California, Irvine, he later transferred to Southern California College majoring in religion with an emphasis on the Bible. He earned his M.Div. and Ph.D. from Princeton Theological Seminary and is ordained in the Presbyterian Church (USA).

Yamada taught Hebrew Bible at Seabury-Western Theological Seminary before moving to McCormick Theological Seminary in 2008. During his time at McCormick, he directed the seminary's Center for Asian American Ministries and, in 2011, became its first Asian American president. Since 2014, Yamada was on the board of the Association of Theological Schools and, beginning in July 2017, became the association's executive director.
