= Affirm United =

Canadian Christian LGBTQ rights organization

- Formation: 1982
- Region served: Canada
- Official language: English & French

Affirm United (French: S'affirmer Ensemble; lit. 'affirming ourselves together') is a Canadian Christian organization associated with the United Church of Canada that aims to include and support LGBTQ people in the Church.

== History ==
Affirm United was created under the name "Affirm" in 1982 by a group of gay and lesbian members of the United Church of Canada. The network was intended to defend and speak for gay and lesbian members of the Church. A program for "affirming ministries" was initiated in 1992. The group's mandate of 2025 calls for education, action, and support for people of all sexual orientations and gender identities. The organization is also interested in efforts for Truth and Reconciliation in Canada, and in making the Church a more inclusive organization in general.

Affirm United also publishes an online magazine or newsletter called Consensus.
