= Evangelical Seminary =

Graduate school and interdenominational seminary

Coordinates: 40.3727°N 76.3070°W

Evangelical Seminary is a private graduate school and interdenominational seminary in Myerstown, Pennsylvania. It is part of Kairos University.

== History ==
The Evangelical Congregational (EC) Church began with the conversion of Jacob Albright, a Pennsylvania German farmer, in a Methodist class meeting. He attempted to convert people to Christianity at a time when the Methodist Church did not allow worship services to be conducted in German. His converts took the name Evangelische Gemeinschaft (Evangelical Association) in 1816, and in the 1890s, when a large minority of the Association reorganized as the United Evangelical (UE) Church in 1894. Faculty and students from the Association’s Schuylkill Seminary moved to the former campus of Palatinate College in Myerstown in 1894 and established Albright College. Subsequently the college relocated to Reading, in 1928 after the Evangelical Association and the United Evangelical Church merged in 1922 to form the Evangelical Church which subsequently merged into The United Methodist Church. At the same time, the East Pennsylvania Conference and other congregations of the United Evangelical Church that had abstained from the merger reorganized as the Evangelical Congregational Church and bought the campus of the college that they had supported as the site for a publishing house, retirement home, and educational institution.

In 2021, it became a founding member of the university network Kairos University.

== Campus and locale ==
Located in the south-central Pennsylvania town of Myerstown, Evangelical’s twelve-acre campus is in the farmlands of Lebanon County.

== Academics ==
Evangelical was formerly accredited by the Commission on Higher Education of the Middle States Association of Schools and Colleges and the Association of Theological Schools in the United States and Canada.
