= Corey D. B. Walker =

Humanities professor

Corey D. B. Walker is a professor who specializes in African American social, political, and religious thought. He is the author of A Noble Fight: African American Freemasonry and the Struggle for Democracy in America, published by the University of Illinois Press. Walker also acted as editor of a special issue on "Theology and Democratic Futures" of the journal Political Theology and was the Associate Editor of Sage's Encyclopedia of Identity. He is the Dean of Wake Forest University School of Divinity, Wake Forest Professor of the Humanities, and Director of the Program in African American Studies at Wake Forest University,

== Education ==
Walker earned a bachelor's degree in finance from Norfolk State University, M.Div. degree from Virginia Union University, M.T.S. degree from Harvard Divinity School, and a Ph.D. in American Studies from The College of William and Mary.

== Career ==
Prior to assuming his position a Wake Forest Professor of the Humanities, he was a visiting professor in the Jepson School of Leadership Studies and the Humanities at the University of Richmond, and had served as dean for the Samuel DeWitt Proctor School of Theology at Virginia Union University. He also served as dean of the College of Arts and Sciences, and as the John W. and Anna Hodgin Hanes Professor of the Humanities at Winston-Salem State University. Previously, he was the chair of the department of Africana Studies at Brown University. Walker also served as a member of the faculty in the department of Religious Studies and the Carter G. Woodson Institute for African and African American Studies at the University of Virginia, director of the Center for the Study of Local Knowledge at the University of Virginia, and visiting professor at the Historisches Institut at Friedrich-Schiller-Universität Jena.

Dr. Walker also serves as the Senior Fellow in Religious Freedom at the Religious Freedom Center of the Freedom Forum Institute in Washington, D.C.

== Publications & Talks ==
- A Noble Fight: African American Freemasonry and the Struggle for Democracy in America, (Champaign: University of Illinois Press, 2008)
- Editor of the special issue of the journal Political Theology on the theme "Theology and Democratic Futures,"
- Associate editor of the Sage Encyclopedia of Identity.
- My Skin as a Legacy: Toward an Ethics of Slavery, Race and Memory (Wake Forest University Slavery, Race and Memory Project Lecture Series, 2019

== Films ==
Walker co-directed and co-produced the documentary film Fifeville with acclaimed artist and filmmaker Kevin Jerome Everson.
