= Wake Forest University School of Divinity =

American ecumenical divinity school

Coordinates: 36.1353°N 80.2790°W

- Type: Private divinity school
- Established: 1999
- Parent institution: Wake Forest University
- Dean: Corey D.B. Walker
- Academic staff: 19
- Location: P.O. Box 7719, Winston-Salem, NC 27109, Winston-Salem, North Carolina, U.S.
- Campus: Urban
- Colors: Old Gold & Black
- Website: divinity.wfu.edu

Wake Forest University School of Divinity is an ecumenical divinity school located on the campus of Wake Forest University in Winston-Salem, North Carolina. The School offers a Master of Divinity degree as well several joint degree programs in cooperation with other graduate programs at the university in bioethics, counseling, education, law, and sustainability. The school has 19 faculty.

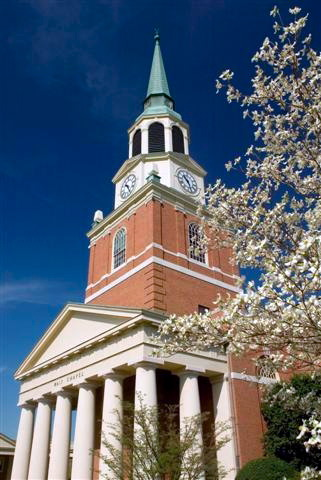

== About ==
Wake Forest University developed out of an institute established by the Baptist State Convention of North Carolina in 1834, and its first head was the Rev. Samuel Wait. From the beginning, the education of ministers was a primary purpose. In 1946 the trustees of Wake Forest College and the Baptist State Convention accepted a proposal by the Z. Smith Reynolds Foundation to relocate the college from the town of Wake Forest to the growing city of Winston-Salem. Much of the estate of the R. J. Reynolds family was donated for the campus, and when the college moved to the new location in 1956, the theological seminary remained at the old campus. In 1967 Wake Forest became a university with a graduate school, medical school, and law school. In 1989 the trustees of the university approved the idea of forming a School of Divinity, and Baptist churches were major financial contributors to the new school. The very first gift came from the First Baptist Church in New Bern, N.C. where Samuel Wait once served. The first students were admitted in 1999 and accreditation was granted in 2005 by the Association of Theological Schools in the United States and Canada.

The Baptist heritage informs the School of Divinity, but from the beginning the school has been intentionally ecumenical in terms of faculty, student body, and curriculum. It is the first university-based divinity school to begin with no formal denominational affiliation.

The School of Divinity also offers optional concentrated studies within the M.Div. degree: the Well-Being and Religious Leadership Program with curricular concentrations in food and faith, and faith and health of the public; in partnership with the Department of Education the school offers a concentration in Education designed to enable students who already hold teaching certificates to qualify for a North Carolina Master's level certification; and in collaboration with the Wake Forest University Center for Energy, Environment, and Sustainability (CEES) the school offers a graduate certificate in sustainability.

Graduates of the School of Divinity serve in various religious leadership positions and in other fields: 37% in congregational ministry, 13% in chaplaincy, 10% in non-profit work, 7% in education, 3% in counseling, 7% are completing additional education (Ph.D., second Masters, etc.), and 23% in other fields, including law, physical therapy, spirituality (spiritual direction, healing touch), education (teaching, librarian), career and personal coaching, healthcare and patient relations, small business (locally owned and operated tea shop, photography), government (patent and licensing division), communications and marketing, banking and investments, publishing, and personal fitness and well-being.

=== Degrees offered ===
The School of Divinity offers The Master of Divinity (M.Div.) and, combined with other schools of the university, joint degrees in bioethics, counseling, education, law, and sustainability.

=== Accreditation ===
Wake Forest University is accredited by the Southern Association of Colleges and Schools.
The School of Divinity is accredited by the Association of Theological Schools in the United States and Canada.

=== Center for Religion and Public Affairs ===
In March 2013, the Center for Religion and Public Affairs' director, Melissa Rogers, was named as the Director of the Office of Faith-Based and Neighborhood Partnerships for the White House. With Rogers's new appointment the center is no longer operating. Since 2004, the Center promoted the research, study and dialogue regarding the intersection of religion and public affairs, and provided resources for policymakers, divinity school students and religious leaders on these issues.

=== Student body ===
The School of Divinity's first class was roughly 20 students—-diverse in age, gender and sexual orientation only; currently the total enrollment is 121 students. 59% of the student body is female, 62% are under 30 years old (students range in age from 21 to 63), and 46% identify as ethnic racial minority. Students come from 73 different colleges and universities, 25 states, and 6 countries (U.S., Belize, Egypt, Germany, Peru, and Tanzania). Over 25 religious affiliations are represented in the community.

== Founding faculty ==
- Bill J. Leonard – Dean, School of Divinity and Professor of Church History
- Phyllis Trible – Associate Dean, School of Divinity and Professor of Biblical Studies
- E. Frank Tupper – Professor of Theology
- Samuel F. Weber, OSB – Associate Professor of Spiritual Formation and Early Christianity

== Deans ==
- Bill J. Leonard (May 1996 – 30 June 2010)
- Gail R. O'Day (1 July 2010 – 30 June 2018)
- Jill Y. Crainshaw (acting, 1 July 2017; interim, 1 July 2018 – 30 June 2019; acting, 1 July 2019 - 31 December 2019)
- Jonathan L. Walton (1 July 2019 – 24 October 2022)
- Corey D. B. Walker (24 October 2022 – present)
