= Theodore Wardlaw =

American Presbyterian minister

Theodore J. Wardlaw is an American Presbyterian minister who was president emeritus of Austin Presbyterian Theological Seminary in Austin, Texas until his retirement in 2022. After his retirement there, he became the editor of the Journal for Preachers.

He holds the following degrees:

- Bachelor of Arts degree from Presbyterian College in Clinton, South Carolina
- DMin from Union Presbyterian Seminary in Richmond, Virginia
- Master of Sacred Theology degree (American Church History) from Yale University Divinity School
