= Lutheran Theological Seminary, Saskatoon =

Theological school affiliated with the University of Saskatchewan

Lutheran Theological Seminary Saskatoon
- Other names: LTS
- Type: Public
- Established: 1913
- Religious affiliation: Lutheran
- Academic affiliations: Saskatoon Theological Union, ATS, University of Saskatchewan, ABHE
- President: William H. Harrison
- Academic staff: 2 full-time, varying sessionals
- Students: 13 students [5.7 FTE]
- Location: 1121 College Drive Saskatoon, Saskatchewan, Canada S7N 0W3; 52°08′14″N 106°38′18″W
- Campus: Urban/Suburban
- Colours: Red
- Website: www.lutherantheological.ca

Lutheran Theological Seminary Saskatoon is a degree-granting theological school affiliated with the University of Saskatchewan. The seminary was originally created to prepare candidates for Lutheran ministry in Western Canada. It is supported by the four Western synods of the Evangelical Lutheran Church in Canada. LTS provides training for pastors and diaconal ministers; offers Lutheran formation for leaders and laypeople; and advances the study of rural ministry.

== History ==
In 1913 the Evangelical Lutheran Synod of Manitoba and Other Provinces founded the Lutheran College and Seminary (LCS), which finally settled on 8th Street in Saskatoon in 1915. In 1939 the Norwegian Lutheran Church in America established the Luther Theological Seminary, first on the campus of the Lutheran College and Seminary and then, in 1946, on a separate campus in Saskatoon, on Wiggins Avenue. For almost twenty years, Lutherans in Western Canada maintained two theological schools.

A merger occurred in 1965, joining the two organizations into the present Lutheran Theological Seminary Saskatoon, with a faculty of six and a student body of thirty. In 1968 the school moved to the University of Saskatchewan campus and into close proximity of ESC (The College of Emmanuel and St. Chad) and SAC (St. Andrew's College). Even at this early stage, the training was ecumenical; students registered in one school were free to take classes toward their degrees in the other two schools. In the same year, an arrangement was reached with the Central Pentecostal College, now Horizon College and Seminary. In 1969 LTS, ESC and SAC established a Graduate School of Theology which would later be known as the Saskatoon Theological Union. In the late 80s, LTS introduced a non-ordination Master of Theological Studies (MTS) Program and a graduate-level Master of Pastoral Counseling (MPC).

When the ELCIC approved the diaconal ministry roster, the Seminary began to develop a program to address the academic needs of these students. The seminary, in conjunction with the ELCIC's Candidate Committees and the national Program Committee for Leadership in Ministry (PCLM), helps coordinate the recruitment and discernment process for candidates for pastoral leadership.

== Presidents ==
Luther College and Seminary 1911–1965

- Juergen Goos, 1911–1918
- Henry W. Harms, 1918–1931
- Werner Magnus, 1931–1936
- Nils Willison, 1937–1949
- Earl J. Treusch, 1950–1955
- Otto A. Olson, 1955–1958
- Walter H.P. Freitag, 1962–1965

Luther Theological Seminary, 1939–1965

- John R. Lavik, 1939–1953
- Olaf K. Storaasli, 1953–1959
- George Evenson, 1959–1965
- Lutheran Faculty of Theology
- Thomas P. Solem, 1965–1966

Lutheran Theological Seminary Saskatoon

- William Hordern, 1965–1985
- Roger Nostbakken, 1985–1996
- Faith E. Rohrbough, 1996–2004
- Erwin Buck, 2004–2005
- Kevin A. Ogilvie, 2006–2015
- Michael Nel, 2015–2017
- William H. Harrison, 2017–present

== Programs ==
The Seminary currently offers:

- Master of Divinity (M.Div.)
- Master of Theological Studies (MTS)
- Diploma in Diaconal Ministry (DDM)
- Certificate in Lutheran Leadership (Lay Track)
- Certificate in Lutheran Leadership (Pastoral Track)
- Doctor of Ministry (D.Min.)

== Sources ==
- Lutheran Theological Seminary Saskatoon
- Saskatoon Theological Union
- ATS profile for Lutheran Theological Seminary
