= Gail R. O'Day =

American biblical scholar (1954–2018)

Gail Radcliffe O'Day (2 December 1954 – 22 September 2018) was an American biblical scholar.

== Early life and education ==
O'Day was born in Muhlenberg, New Jersey, on 2 December 1954, while her father Arthur F. O'Day served in the Korean War. Upon the end of his military service, Arthur and his wife Sally Wilcox O'Day moved to her hometown, Scituate, Massachusetts. The family moved to Chappaqua, New York, in 1965, where O'Day was a student at Horace Greeley High School. She earned a bachelor's of arts degree at Brown University in 1976, followed by a Master of Theological Studies from Harvard Divinity School and a Ph.D. in New Testament from Emory University. O'Day's research on the New Testament focused on the Gospel of John.

== Career ==
O'Day was an ordained minister of the United Church of Christ. She taught at Hamilton College and Eden Theological Seminary before joining the Candler School of Theology faculty from 1987 to 2010. O'Day assumed the deanship of the Wake Forest University School of Divinity from Bill J. Leonard in 2010. She resigned the position effective 30 June 2018. O'Day was diagnosed with glioblastoma in 2015, and died of the disease on 22 September 2018.

== Selected works ==
- Revelation in the fourth Gospel : narrative mode and theological claim, 1986
- The Word disclosed : John's story and narrative preaching, 1987
- The Word disclosed : preaching the Gospel of John, 2002
- John, 2006
- Preaching the Revised common lectionary : a guide, 2007
- Theological Bible commentary, 2009
