= Jonathan L. Walton =

American theologian

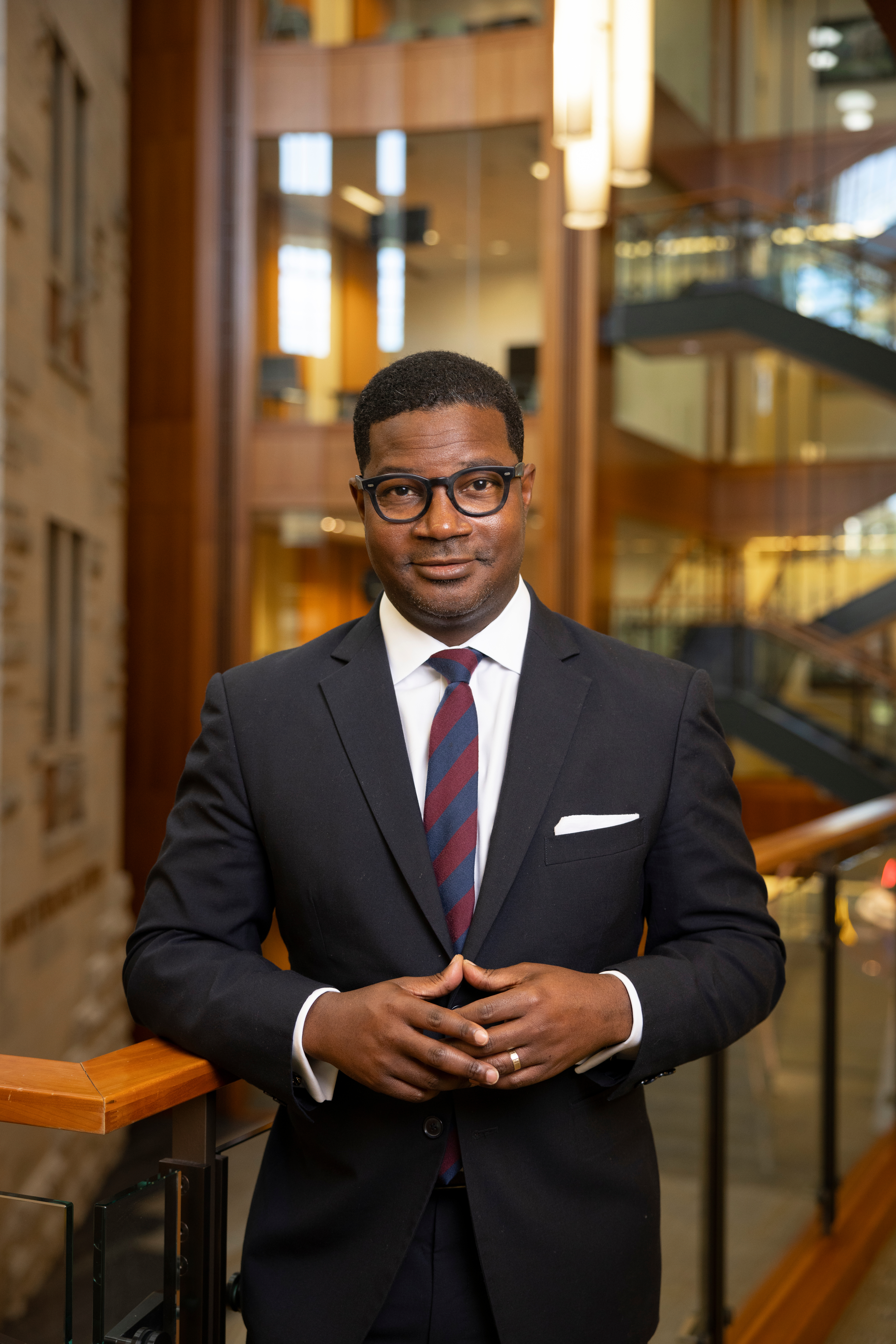
- Jonathan L. Walton

President of Princeton Theological Seminary
- Incumbent
- Assumed office 2023
- Preceded by: M. Craig Barnes

Dean of Wake Forest University School of Divinity
- In office 2019–2023

Personal details
- Born: June 22, 1973 (age 53) Frederick, Maryland, U.S.
- Education: Morehouse College (BA) Princeton Theological Seminary (MDiv, PhD)

Jonathan Lee Walton (born June 22, 1973) is an American author, ethicist and religious scholar. He is the president of Princeton Theological Seminary in Princeton, New Jersey. Previously, he served as the Plummer Professor of Christian Morals and the Pusey Minister in the Memorial Church of Harvard University. Just prior to being named president of Princeton Seminary, he was the dean of the Wake Forest University School of Divinity, Presidential Chair in Religion & Society and Dean of Wait Chapel. He is the author of A Lens of Love: Reading the Bible in its World for Our World.

== Early life and education ==
Walton was born in Frederick, Maryland to John H. Walton and Rose Marie Walton. His father was an air traffic controller with the Federal Aviation Administration and his mother was a homemaker. His family moved to Syracuse, New York before settling in Atlanta, Georgia in 1980.

In 1991, Walton graduated from Lithonia High School and attended Wofford College on a football scholarship. He transferred to Morehouse College following his freshman year and graduated in 1996 with a BA degree in political science. Walton also became a licensed minister that same year and entered the Princeton Theological Seminary in 1999, completing his MDiv in 2002 and his PhD in 2006.

== Career ==
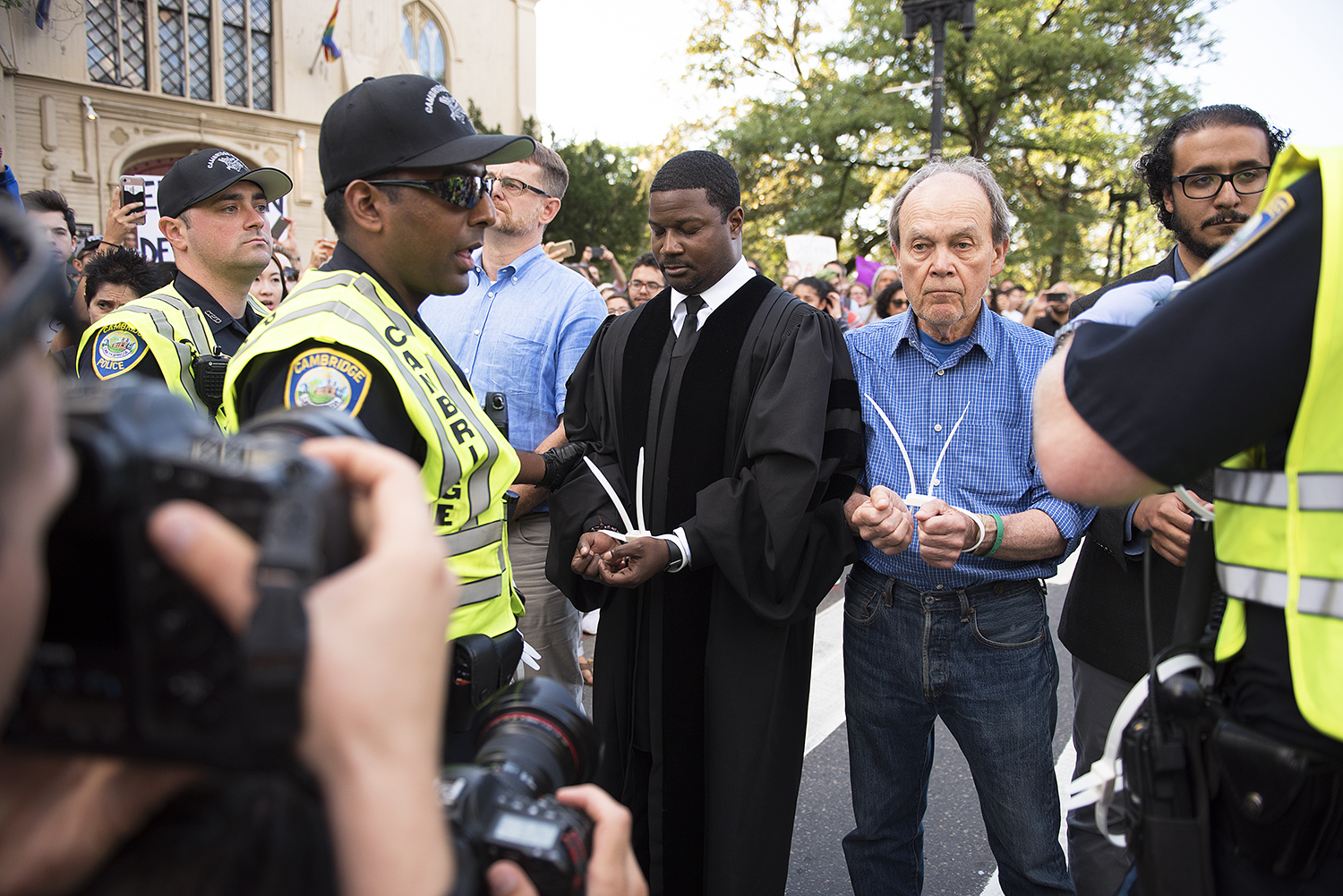
Harvard Professor Jonathan L. Walton with more than 30 fellow faculty members during a protest in Cambridge against the repeal of the DACA program.

Walton began his professional career as a minister while pursuing his academic studies. He served as the officiating pastor of Memorial West Presbyterian Church in Newark, New Jersey.

In 2003, he was appointed a lecturer at Princeton University's Department of Religion and The Program in African American Studies. He accepted a position as assistant professor of Religious Studies at the University of California, Riverside in 2006.

Walton joined the faculty at Harvard University in 2010 as assistant professor of African American Religions, Harvard Divinity School, and resident scholar of Lowell House, Harvard College.

In 2012, he was appointed the Plummer Professor of Christian Morals and Pusey Minister in the Memorial Church, following the death of the Rev. Peter J. Gomes, who served in the position for 41 years.

Walton served on several boards and committees at Harvard. He was also on the Board of Trustees at Princeton Theological Seminary, and the National Advisory Board of the John C. Danforth Center on Religion & Politics at Washington University.

In 2019, he was appointed the Dean of Wake Forest University School of Divinity, Presidential Chair in Religion & Society and Dean of Wait Chapel.

In 2022, he was announced as the new President of Princeton Theological Seminary, a seminary in Princeton, New Jersey. In this position, he succeeded the previous president, Presbyterian minister M. Craig Barnes.

== Scholarship ==
In reviewing Walton's book, A Lens of Love, Cornel West said Walton “is one of the very few grand figures in American culture who is both public intellectual and prophetic preacher. His brilliant work and visionary words are legendary at Harvard and throughout the country and world. This timely book is another testament to his calling rooted in the legacies of Martin Luther King Jr., Benjamin Elijah Mays, Reinhold Niebuhr and Fannie Lou Hamer.”

Walton was appointed dean of the Wake Forest University School of Divinity in April 2019. He assumed the position on July 1, 2019.

== Awards and honors ==
- Benjamin Elijah Mays Distinguished Alumni Award in Religion, Morehouse College, 2017.
- Honorary Doctor of Divinity Degree, Wake Forest University, 2015.
- Young Scholars in American Religion 2009–2011, Center for Religion and American Culture, Indiana University-Purdue University.
- Resident Fellow, Center for Ideas and Society, UC Riverside, 2007.

== Personal life ==
Walton and his wife, Cecily Cline Walton, and their three children live in Princeton, NJ.
