= Association of Theological Schools in the United States and Canada =

Accreditation agency for post-secondary schools

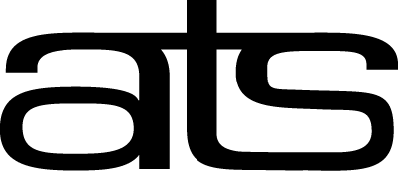
- Formation: 1918
- Type: Nonprofit organization
- Headquarters: Pittsburgh, Pennsylvania, US
- Locations: Canada; United States
- Members: 280
- President: Mary McCormick
- Executive Director: Frank M. Yamada
- Website: www.ats.edu

The Association of Theological Schools in the United States and Canada (ATS) is an organization of seminaries and other graduate schools of theology. ATS has its headquarters in Pittsburgh, Pennsylvania, United States.

== History ==
The ATS was founded in 1918. Its stated mission is "to promote the improvement and enhancement of theological schools to the benefit of communities of faith and the broader public".

The Commission on Accrediting Accrediting of the Association of Theological Schools provides graduate schools of theology with accreditation. It is recognized by both the Council for Higher Education Accreditation and the United States Department of Education as an accrediting body.

Members of the ATS include Protestant, Roman Catholic, Eastern Orthodox, and Jewish institutions.

There are 51 Catholic member institutions of the ATS, 5 Eastern Orthodox ones, with the Academy for Jewish Religion in New York being the sole Jewish member. There are also affiliate member institutions of other faiths include the Islamic Seminary of America and the North American Mobeds Council—Institute of Zoroastrian Studies.

Frank M. Yamada has been the association's executive director since July 2017. As of May 2026, the ATS listed 280 member schools.

== See also ==
- List of schools accredited by the Commission on Accrediting of the Association of Theological Schools in the United States and Canada
