= List of Omicron Delta Kappa members =

The following is a list of Omicron Delta Kappa members Omicron Delta Kappa, also known as The Circle, an honor society located in the United States with chapters at more than 300 college campuses. Honoris Causa members are honorary members.

== Academia ==
- Paul R. Anderson (Ohio Wesleyan University, 1928), president of Chatham University and Temple University
- Anthony Joseph Arduengo III (Alpha Eta, 1972), chemist and professor at Georgia Tech and the University of Alabama
- Raymond Burse (1972), president of Kentucky State University
- Frank G. Dickey (University of Kentucky, 1951), president of the University of Kentucky
- Joseph I. Goldstein (Washington and Lee University, Honoris Causa, 1961), professor and dean of engineering at the University of Massachusetts Amherst
- William Hazell, president of the New Jersey Institute of Technology
- Frank Hereford (Omicron), president of the University of Virginia
- Thomas Hines, professor emeritus of history at the University of California, Los Angeles
- Ediat Killgore Kirkpatrick (Louisiana State University, Honoris Causa, 1968), music teacher in McNeese State University and member of the Louisiana Board of Regents
- Sidney A. McPhee (Honoris Causa, 2010), tenth president of Middle Tennessee State University
- Shirley Mullen (Westmont College, Honoris Causa), president of Houghton University
- Frank Rose (University of Kentucky,1955), president of the University of Alabama
- Thomas Warren Ross (Davidson College, 2008), president of the University of North Carolina system and of Davidson College
- Rudolph Rummel, professor emeritus of political science at the University of Hawaiʻi who coined the term "democide"
- Kenneth P. Ruscio (Alpha, 1975), president of Washington and Lee University
- Donna Shalala, president of the University of Miami
- Henry Louis Smith (Alpha, 1914), president of Davidson College
- Cornel West, Dietrich Bonhoeffer Chair, Union Theological Seminary
- Walter Williams (Alpha Xi, Honoris Causa), president of the University of Missouri, founder of the world's first journalism school at the University of Missouri, and founder of the Alpha Xi Circle at Missouri

== Business ==
- Ely Callaway Jr. (Mu, 1940), entrepreneur, textiles executive, winemaker, and golf club manufacturer
- Robert S. Jepson Jr. (Epsilon, 1963), philanthropist, businessman, and chair of the Georgia Ports Authority
- Richard D. Kinder (Alpha Xi), CEO of Kinder Morgan, former president of Enron
- Kenneth L. Lay (Alpha Xi, 1964), former chairman and CEO of Enron
- Robert T. McCowan (University of Kentucky, 1951), president of Ashland Petroleum and executive vice chairman of Ashland, Inc.
- S. Robson Walton (Beta Beta, 1965), chairman of Wal-Mart Stores, Inc.

== Entertainment ==
- Yvette Nicole Brown (The University of Akron, 1994), actress and comedian
- Scott Crary (State University of New York at Plattsburgh, 2000), director and producer
- Walter Cronkite (Florida Southern College, Honoris Causa, 1979), anchorman for CBS Evening News
- Sheryl S. Crow (University of Missouri, 1983), singer/songwriter, winner of nine Grammy Awards
- Tara Dawn Holland (Florida State University, 1993), Miss America 1997
- Bob Hope (Tulane University, Honoris Causa, 1964), actor
- Joe Johns (Marshall University), correspondent for CNN
- Cokie Roberts (The University of Akron), Emmy Award-winning journalist and bestselling author
- Matthew Shaffer (Wilson College, 2023), director, choreographer, and author
- Bob Wolff (Duke University, 1942), longest-running sports broadcaster in television and radio history

== Law ==
- Amy Coney Barrett (Rhodes College, 1994), associate justice of the U.S. Supreme Court and federal judge with the U.S. Court of Appeals for the Seventh Circuit
- Abe Fortas (Rhodes College, 1930), former associate justice of the U.S. Supreme Court
- John R. Gibson (University of Missouri, 1948), senior federal judge of the U.S. Court of Appeals for the Eighth Circuit
- Lewis Franklin Powell Jr. (Washington and Lee University, 1928), former associate justice of the U.S. Supreme Court
- David Gray Ross (American University), judge with the Prince George's County Circuit Court, lawyer, and member of the Maryland House of Delegates

== Literature and journalism ==
- Barry Bishop (Alpha Theta, 1953), mountaineer, photographer, and photography editor and executive vice chair of research for National Geographic
- Hodding Carter (University of the South, Honoris Causa, 1953), progressive journalist, author, and Nieman Fellow and Pulitzer Prize winner
- Douglass Wallop (University of Maryland College Park, 1941), novelist and playwright, librettist of Damn Yankees

== Politics ==
- Joe Biden (University of Delaware, Honoris Causa, 1981), president of the United States
- George H. W. Bush (Harding University, Honoris Causa, 1997), president of the United States
- Jimmy Carter (Georgia State University, Honoris Causa, 1972), president of the United States
- Winston S. Churchill III (Florida Southern College, Honoris Causa, 1990), English Conservative politician
- Hillary Clinton (Alfred University, Honoris Causa, 2000), U.S. senator and First Lady of the United States
- Gordon R. England (University of Maryland College Park, 1963), U.S. secretary of the Navy, former U.S. deputy secretary of defense, and former U.S. deputy secretary of Homeland Security
- Donald Evans (University of Texas at Austin, 1971), 34th U.S. secretary of commerce
- Gerald R. Ford (Florida Southern College, Honoris Causa, 1984), president of the United States
- Martin Frost (University of Missouri, 1962), former member of the U.S. House of Representatives for Texas's 24th congressional district and political commentator with Fox News Channel
- Maurice Jones (Hampden–Sydney College), U.S. deputy secretary of HUD and Virginia secretary of commerce
- Mary Martha Presley Merritt (University of Kentucky), member of the West Virginia House of Delegates and president of the West Virginia Board of Education
- Walter Mondale (University of South Carolina, Honoris Causa, 1981), vice president of the United States
- Franklin D. Roosevelt (University of Maryland, Honoris Causa, 1940), president of the United States
- Dean Rusk (Davidson College, 1930), 54th U.S. secretary of state
- Virginia Kilpatrick Shehee (Centenary College, 1975), first woman elected to the Louisiana State Senate and first woman initiated into Omicron Delta Kappa
- Margaret Thatcher (Harding University, Honoris Causa, 1995), prime minister of the United Kingdom
- Lloyd F. Wheat (Louisiana State University), member of the Louisiana State Senate 1948–1952
- E. F. L. Wood, 1st Earl of Halifax (University of Maryland, Honoris Causa, 1941), British Conservative politician

== Religion ==
- Clay Foster Lee Jr. (Pi, 1951), retired bishop of the United Methodist Church

== Science and engineering ==
- Wernher von Braun (Grove City College, Honoris Causa, 1961), aerospace engineer
- David Carlisle Humphreys (Alpha, 1914), engineer, architect, cartographer, hydrographer, and co-founder of Omicron Delta Kappa
- F. Story Musgrave (University of Kentucky, Honoris Causa, 1984), physician, retired NASA astronaut
- Jonas Salk (University of Pittsburgh, Honoris Causa, 1954), virologist and medical researcher who developed one of the first successful polio vaccines
- Paul Alan Wetter (University of Miami School of Medicine, 1975), physician and minimally invasive and robotic surgery pioneer and innovator

== Sports ==
- Griff Aldrich (Hampden-Sydney College, 1996), head coach of Longwood University
- Mitch Barnhart (University of Kentucky, Honoris Causa, 2017), college sports administrator
- Frank Beamer (Virginia Tech, 1967), head coach for Virginia Tech Hokies football team
- Terry Bowden (Auburn University, 1994), college football head coach
- Paul "Bear" Bryant (University of Kentucky, 1949), head coach for the University of Alabama football team
- Joshua Dobbs (University of Tennessee, 2016), professional football player for the Pittsburgh Steelers, Jacksonville Jaguars, Cleveland Browns, Tennessee Titans, Arizona Cardinals, and Minnesota Vikings
- Ron Fraser (University of Miami, 1975), college baseball coach at the University of Miami
- Bob Griese (University of Miami, 1988), professional football player for the Miami Dolphins
- Gene Keady (Purdue University, 1988), head coach for Purdue University basketball
- Archie Manning (University of Mississippi, 1970), professional football player for the New Orleans Saints, Houston Oilers, and Minnesota Vikings
- Peyton Manning (University of Tennessee, 1997), professional football player for the Indianapolis Colts and Denver Broncos
- Rudy Niswanger (Louisiana State University, 2005), professional football player for the Kansas City Chiefs
- Arnold Palmer (Wake Forest University, 1964), professional golfer
- Joe Paterno (Pennsylvania State University, 1976), football coach
- Gaylord Perry (Campbell University, 1978), professional baseball player and two-time Cy Young Award winner
- James E. Perry (Campbell University, 1978), professional baseball player and Cy Young Award winner
- Homer Rice (Georgia Institute of Technology, 1981), football coach and athletic director at Georgia Tech
- Myron Rolle (Florida State University, 2008), football player for the Florida State University Seminoles and 2009 Rhodes Scholar
- Adolph Rupp (University of Kentucky, 1937), University of Kentucky basketball head coach
- Tubby Smith (University of Kentucky, 2001), men's college basketball coach
- Steve Spurrier (University of Florida, 1991), Heisman Trophy winner, professional football player, and head coach for the University of Florida, the Washington Redskins, and the South Carolina Gamecocks
