= John Kuykendall =

Professor of religion, college president

15th President of Davidson College
- In office 1984–1997
- Preceded by: Samuel Reid Spencer, Jr.
- Succeeded by: Robert F. Vagt

Personal details
- Born: 1938 (age 87–88) Charlotte, North Carolina, U.S.
- Education: Davidson College; Union Theological Seminary; Yale Divinity School; Princeton University
- Profession: Professor; Pastor college president

John Wells Kuykendall was the 15th president of Davidson College in Davidson, North Carolina, United States. Graduating from Davidson in 1959, Kuykendall went on to receive a bachelor in divinity from Union Theological Seminary and then more advanced degrees from Yale Divinity School and Princeton University. He eventually became a professor of religion and campus pastor at Auburn University.

As president, Kuykendall focused on expanding the endowment, specifically in overseeing a $160 million capital campaign, which was the largest capital campaign for a liberal arts college at that time. He also spearheaded the creation of the Dean Rusk Program in International Studies, named after Dean Rusk.

After retiring as president, Kuykendall served as interim president after Thomas W. Ross resigned and stayed on until Carol Quillen was appointed.

Academic offices
| Preceded by Samuel Reid Spencer, Jr. | President of Davidson College; 1984–1997 | Succeeded by Robert F. Vagt |
