= Luther McKinnon =

American educator (1840–1916)

7th President of Davidson College
- In office 1885–1888
- Preceded by: Andrew Dousa Hepburn
- Succeeded by: John Bunyan Shearer

Personal details
- Born: October 31, 1840 Maxton, Robeson County, North Carolina
- Died: May 28, 1916 (aged 75) Sampson County, North Carolina
- Education: Davidson College
- Profession: Chaplain

Luther McKinnon was the seventh president of Davidson College and the first alumnus to become president. After graduating as salutatorian from Davidson in 1861, McKinnon joined the Confederate States Army as a chaplain. McKinnon became ill after becoming president, struck with what was described as "rheumatism," and resigned as president. McKinnon lived as an invalid for the rest of life, settling in Clinton, North Carolina.

Academic offices
Preceded by John Rennie Blake	President of Davidson College; 1885–1888	Succeeded by John Bunyan Shearer
