= Samuel Reid Spencer Jr. =

American academic administrator

14th President of Davidson College
- In office 1968–1983
- Preceded by: David Grier Martin
- Succeeded by: John Kuykendall

Personal details
- Born: June 6, 1919 Rock Hill, South Carolina, U.S.
- Died: October 16, 2013 (aged 94) Davidson, North Carolina, U.S.
- Children: Clayton Spencer Samuel Reid Spencer Ellen Spencer Rev. Dr. Frank Clark Spencer
- Education: Davidson College (BA); Harvard University (PhD)

Military service
- Branch/service: United States Army
- Battles/wars: World War II

Samuel Reid Spencer Jr. (June 6, 1919 – October 16, 2013) was an American academic administrator who served as the 14th president of Davidson College from 1968 to 1983.

== Early life and education ==
Originally from South Carolina, Spencer graduated from Davidson in 1940, then serving in the United States Army during World War II. After the war, he earned a PhD from Harvard University. He was one of the last recipients of a Rosenwald Fellowship from the Rosenwald Fund, which closed in 1948. He received it to finance his graduate studies in history at Harvard.

== Career ==
Afterward, Spencer returned to his alma mater to serve as an assistant to then-president John Rood Cunningham, while also becoming a professor of history. Spencer left Davidson to become president of Mary Baldwin College, returning as president in 1968.

As president, Spencer led Davidson's successful attempt to become a co-educational institution. He also focused on minority student recruitment and retention and expanded the endowment. Spencer was also appointed by President Jimmy Carter to the Board of Foreign Scholarships, which oversees the Fulbright Program.

After leaving Davidson, Spencer became the president of the Virginia Foundation of Independent Colleges.

Academic offices
Preceded by David Grier Martin	President of Davidson College; 1968–1983	Succeeded by John Kuykendall
