= Phi Kappa Phi =

International collegiate honor society

- ΦΚΦ
- Founded: March 15, 1897; 129 years ago University of Maine
- Type: Honor
- Affiliation: HSC
- Former affiliation: ACHS
- Status: Active
- Emphasis: All-discipline
- Scope: International
- Motto: Φιλοσοφία Κρατείτω Φωτῶν, Philosophía Krateítõ Phõtôn, 'Let the love of learning rule humanity'
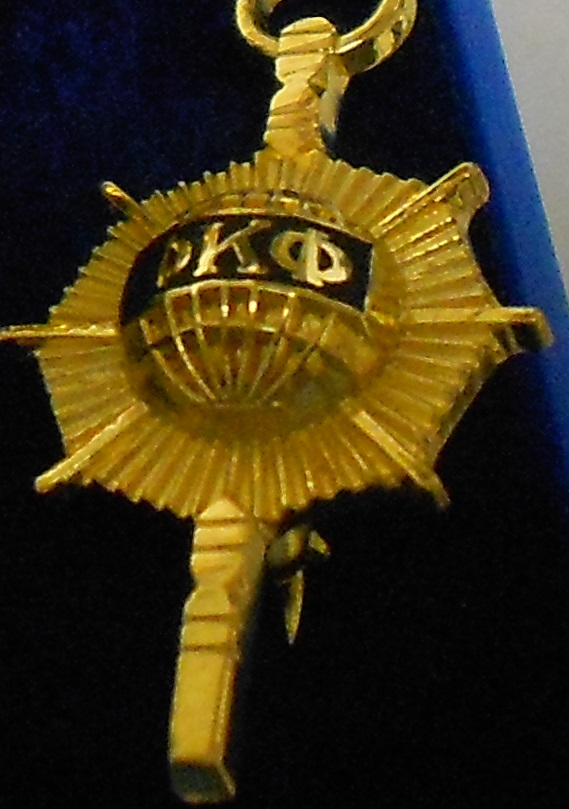
- Member badge
- Colors: Blue and Gold
- Publication: Phi Kappa Phi Forum
- Chapters: 300+
- Members: 100,000 active 1,000,000 lifetime
- Headquarters: 7576 Goodwood Boulevard; Baton Rouge, Louisiana 70806; United States
- Website: phikappaphi.org

The Honor Society of Phi Kappa Phi (or simply Phi Kappa Phi or ΦΚΦ) is an honor society established in 1897 to recognize and encourage superior scholarship without restriction as to the area of study. It was the fourth academic society in the United States to be organized around recognizing academic excellence, and it is the oldest all-discipline honor society. It is a member of the Honor Society Caucus.

== History ==
In the late 1800s, there were only three academic honor societies, and they were all discipline-specific. Tau Beta Pi for engineering and Sigma Xi for scientific research were founded in 1885 and 1886, respectively. Phi Beta Kappa was a social and literary society that did not originate as an honor society when it was founded in 1776, but by the 1850s, it had evolved as an honor society for the liberal arts and sciences. Although Phi Beta Kappa was not exclusive to one discipline, it did not extend its membership beyond the liberal arts and sciences, hence the establishment of Tau Beta Pi, an honor society for engineering. Phi Beta Kappa became sufficient as an all-campus honor society for liberal arts colleges, but no honor society could serve as such for the universities encompassing both liberal education and also technological and professional education, a mission to which the newly burgeoning land-grant universities of the time were dedicated.

That changed in 1897 when the first organizational meeting of Lambda Sigma Eta (later named Phi Kappa Phi), the nation's first all-discipline honor society, was held in Coburn Hall at the University of Maine under the leadership of undergraduate student Marcus Urann. In opposition to what he saw as the separateness and exclusivity promoted by the social fraternities and discipline bound honor societies, Urann wanted to create a society that was defined by inclusiveness and that unified a campus, constituted by "high-rank men drawn from all classes and all groups and all societies". The honor society was formed to recognize and encourage superior scholarship without restriction as to the area of study, and to promote the "unity and democracy of education".

Those selected for invitation into the society would be the top ten students of the senior class whose rank did not fall below the 90th percentile for the four years of work at the university. In all, the society was founded by ten senior students, two faculty members, and the university president, Abram Winegaard Harris. Urann graduated in 1897, and became the president of Phi Kappa. A year or so later, the name was changed to the Morrill Society, in honor of the sponsor of the Congressional Act which provided for land-grant universities. In 1899, the first woman was initiated into the society, Pearl Clayton Swain.

In 1900, the society became national in scope by action of the presidents of the University of Maine (the founding chapter), University of Tennessee, and Pennsylvania State University. There was considerable debate among the three existing chapters regarding the purpose and naming of the society. Pennsylvania State University's President George W. Atherton cautioned that using Greek letters to label the society would be "too much like aping other organizations", and President Charles W. Dabney of the University of Tennessee did not want to accept institutions that already had a chapter of Phi Beta Kappa. Nonetheless, on June 12, 1900, the society changed its name to Phi Kappa Phi, drawing from the initial letters of the Greek words forming its motto.

In 1900, the three original chapters convened the society's first national convention in New Haven, Connecticut. In 1915, Phi Kappa Phi continued to struggle to earn a reputation. The then secretary of the organization, L. H. Pammel, pointed out that institutions that were seeking to establish a chapter of Phi Beta Kappa were often hesitant about establishing a chapter of Phi Kappa Phi. To this, the society continued to make its case:

Phi Beta Kappa, which was repeated time after time, represented the literary side of education such as history, literature, and economics. 'The Phi Kappa Phi on the other hand stands not only for the democracy of education, making no distinction between different lines of investigation, such as literature, history, science, home economics, agriculture, veterinary medicine, and law, but for sound scholarship based on four years of collegiate work.'

It was later asserted that the society's aim was not to replace older societies, but to "help raise the broader educational program initiated by our government when it established the land-grant system, to the appreciation of scholarly worth whether the subject matter be strictly academic or of a more vocational type." Its mission is "to recognize and promote academic excellence in all fields of higher education and to engage the community of scholars in service to others."

The society published the first issue of The Phi Kappa Phi Journal in 1915. That year, the society established an association with the American Association for the Advancement of Science that would last until 1962. In 1919, Phi Kappa Phi was still struggling with securing growth, and pushed to become part of technical schools. In 1922, the question of admitting African Americans into the society was raised openly, leadership decided that although the constitution did not debar African Americans, the society would not "urge the election of colored people" because the "southern institutions would resent it." Nonetheless, in 1925 the society as a whole formally took the position that it would not discriminate on color or race. Also in 1925, Phi Kappa Phi would be instrumental in creating the Association of College Honor Societies (ACHS), being one of its six charter members.

In 1933, while the Philippines was still an American colony, the first chapter outside of the continental United States was founded at the University of the Philippines. About this time, president of the society Frank D. Kern stated that "integrity, moral courage, spirited discernment, and concern for human welfare" were equally important for membership in the society.

During the two world wars and into the 1960s, society membership numbers and finances struggled. In 1963, Chapter 105 was chartered at the oldest and largest university system in the American territory of Puerto Rico, Universidad de Puerto Rico. By 1969, new member numbers were triple what they were in 1960. That year, the Phi Kappa Phi Foundation was incorporated to promote academic excellence and achievement using scholarships and fellowships.

Phi Kappa Phi badge

In a 1969 Special Convention, the motto devised in 1900, "The Love of Learning Rules all Mankind", was changed to "Let the Love of Learning Rule Mankind" due to membership insistence that the former was, in the words of one member, "the most barefaced lie that had ever been cast in bronze." By 1971, Phi Kappa Phi numbered 120 chapters. In the next twelve years, that number would double to 239. In 1976, Phi Kappa Phi established its first chapter at a historically black college or university when one was established at Jackson State University.

Phi Kappa Phi is a member of the Honor Society Caucus, which is composed of four honor societies: Phi Beta Kappa, Phi Kappa Phi, Sigma Xi, and Omicron Delta Kappa.

== Symbols ==
The society's Greek letter name was selected from its motto Ancient Greek: Φιλοσοφία Κρατείτω Φωτῶν, romanized: Philosophía Krateítõ Phõtôn, lit. 'Let the love of learning rule humanity'. The colors of Phi Kappa Phi are blue and gold.

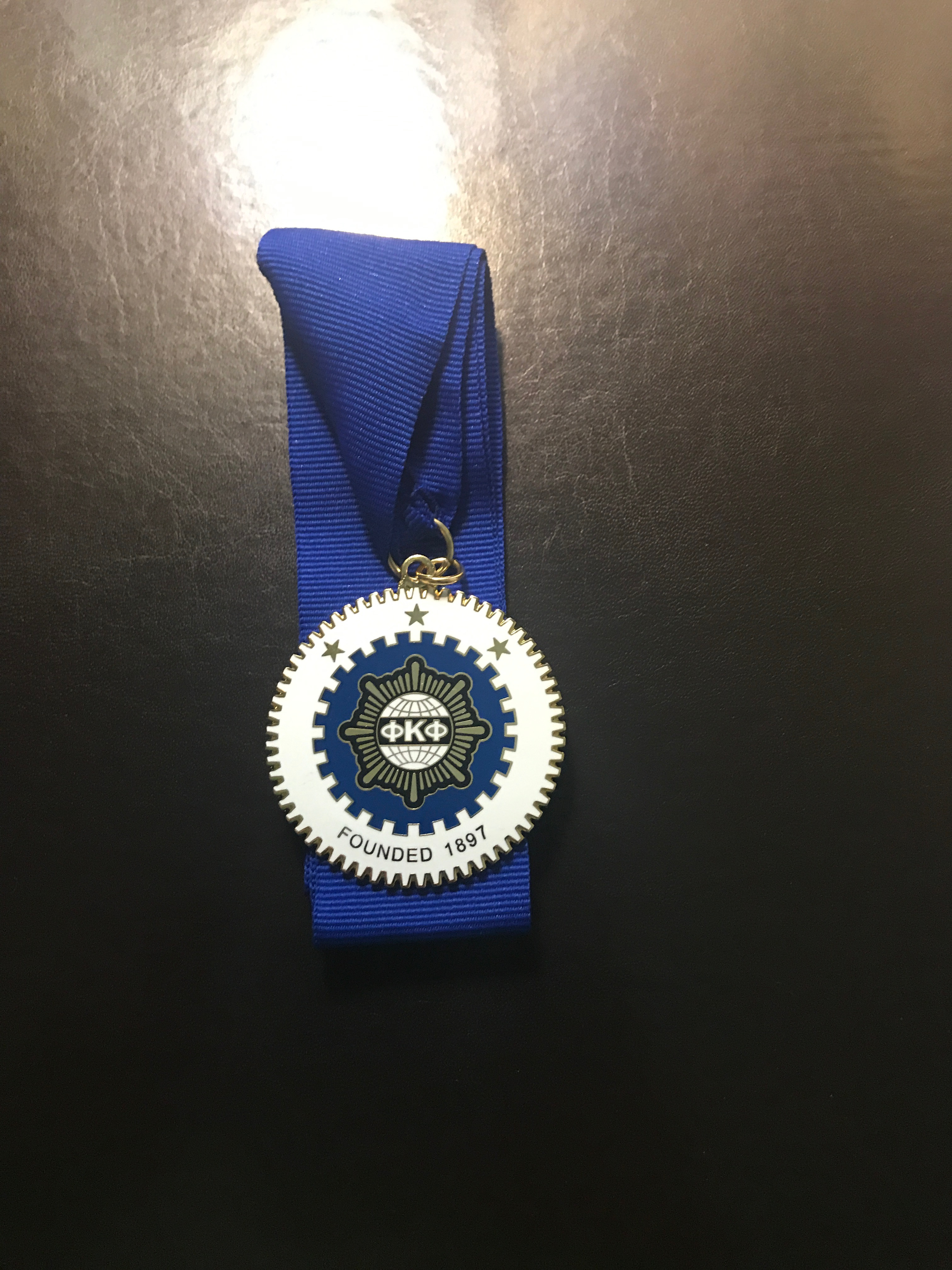
Phi Kappa Phi medallion used for graduation/recognition

=== Badge ===
Phi Kappa Phi badge, which appears on the key and in the center of the society's seal, is the terrestrial globe with the sun's eight-rayed corona extending behind it. The sun represents the dissemination of truth and knowledge as light. The eight-rayed sun represents the various branches into which general education at the time was divided, and the arrangement of the rays "stood for the unity and democracy of the various branches of learning" Encompassing the globe is a band with the Greek letters "ΦΚΦ". This band represents the bond of fellowship that binds all lovers of learning to a common purpose.

=== Seal ===
The society's seal features its badge at its center. This in turn is surrounded by a crenelated line that represents the battlements and walls of Troy and a technological aspect of the ancient Greek culture. In the space between this line and the periphery of the seal appear three stars just above the badge, one for each of the three original chapters. Just below the badge is the phrase "Founded 1897."

Phi Kappa Phi ribbon

Phi Kappa Phi banner

=== Ribbon ===
The society's ribbon portrays the meander pattern common in Greek art, suggesting the enduring values and ideals of learning and community leadership promoted by Phi Kappa Phi.

== Membership ==
Membership is by invitation only, by an established campus chapter, and is restricted to students with integrity and high ethical standards and who are ranked scholastically at the top of their class, regardless of field of study: the top 7.5 percent of second-semester university juniors and the top ten percent of seniors and graduate students. Faculty, professional staff and alumni who have achieved scholarly distinction also might be eligible.

== Activities ==
Phi Kappa Phi awards more than $1.3 million in national and local scholarships annually, as well as grants and graduate fellowships. Baird's Manual of American College Fraternities notes that aim of these awards "is not to give the recipient something which may encourage complacency, but to challenge the member to continued excellence."

To support first-year graduate work, the society now offers annually through the Foundation sixty Fellowships and thirty Awards of Excellence, on a competitive basis, to graduating students who have been initiated into the society and who have also been nominated by their chapters for the competition. In addition, Phi Kappa Phi fosters community service and leadership through its grants for local and national literacy initiatives, promotion of excellence grants, and training and leadership opportunities available to its membership. Some chapters sponsor conferences and campus speakers.

=== Publications ===
Phi Kappa Phi publishes a quarterly journal, The Phi Kappa Phi Forum, and the triannual Honor Chord e-zine. The society also publishes the Monthly Mentions newsletter. Each issue of The Phi Kappa Phi Forum is devoted to a significant theme and addresses prominent issues of the day from an interdisciplinary perspective. The journal features articles by scholars inside and outside the academic community, poetry, and reviews of current books and periodical literature.

== Governance ==
Phi Kappa Phi is a 501(c)(3) organization under the United States Internal Revenue Code. Its national headquarters is located in Baton Rouge, Louisiana.

Phi Kappa Phi is governed by the biennial convention, supplemented by interim special conventions as necessary. Each chapter may send one official delegate to the convention, which is held in a major city in the United States. Between conventions, the business of the society is conducted by a twelve-member board of directors. Elected officers include the president, president-elect, a vice president of development, five directors, two student representatives, and the immediate past president. The board's twelfth member is the executive director who is in charge of the society's national office.

Active chapters elect chapter officers and are governed by the chapter constitution and by-laws.

== Chapters ==
Phi Kappa Phi has over 300 college-based chapters in the United States, Puerto Rico, and the Philippines.

== Notable members ==
Phi Kappa Phi claims to have over 100,000 active members, to initiate approximately 30,000 new members annually, and to have a total of more than one million members since its creation.
