= Robert F. Vagt =

16th President of Davidson College
- In office 1997–2007
- Preceded by: John Kuykendall
- Succeeded by: Thomas W. Ross

Personal details
- Born: 1947 (age 78–79) Connecticut
- Education: Davidson College; Duke Divinity School
- Profession: Hospital administrator businessman

Robert 'Bobby' Vagt was the 16th president of Davidson College. Vagt, originally from Connecticut, graduated from Davidson in 1969. Vagt worked in the ministry and in healthcare until he became the executive director of the Municipal Assistance Corporation for New York City, aiding in efforts to save the city from bankruptcy. Later, Vagt moved to Houston, Texas to work in the energy sector.

While at Davidson, Vagt oversaw one of the largest fundraising campaigns for a liberal arts college. It was under his watch that the college announced that it would eliminate loans for demonstrated financial need, an initiative called the Davidson Trust.

After leaving, Vagt became the president of the Heinz Endowments, leaving that position in 2013.

Academic offices
Preceded by John Kuykendall	President of Davidson College; 1997–2007	Succeeded by Thomas W. Ross
