= David Grier Martin =

American academic (1910–1974)

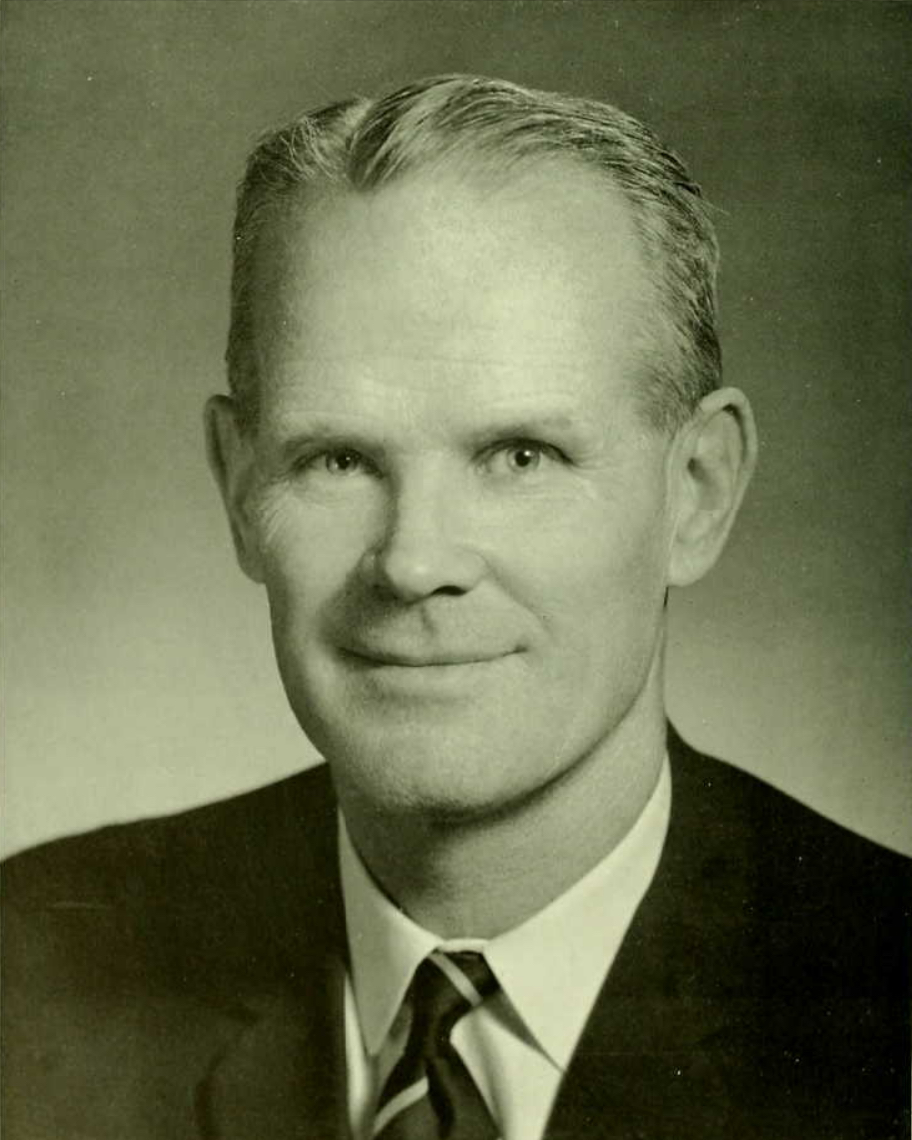

13th President of Davidson College
- In office 1958–1968
- Preceded by: John Rood Cunningham
- Succeeded by: Samuel Reid Spencer Jr.

Personal details
- Born: November 11, 1910 Covington, Georgia
- Died: April 5, 1974 (aged 63) Salisbury, North Carolina
- Spouse: Louise McMichael Martin
- Children: Jack McMichael Martin; D. G. Martin; Embry Martin Howell
- Relatives: Grier Martin (grandson)
- Education: Davidson College; Emory University
- Profession: Professor, administrator

David Grier Martin Sr. (November 11, 1910 – April 5, 1974) was the 13th president of Davidson College. A graduate of Davidson College, class of 1932, he served as college treasurer under President Cunningham. He was forty-eight years old when he accepted the presidency of Davidson. A native of Covington, Georgia, Martin attended Emory University for graduate studies.

During Martin's administration, the permanent endowment greatly increased and several construction projects were completed or near completion including the E.H. Little Dormitory, Patterson Fraternity Court, Dana Science Building, and Richardson Dormitory. Martin also witnessed growth in student enrollment and faculty size, a new curriculum including a foreign study program and humanities courses, the Reynolds Lectures and Richardson Scholars, racial integration, the beginning of data processing, successful financial campaigns, and solid advances in faculty salaries, housing, and fringe benefits.

It was during his time as president that the college began the process of racial integration with the admission of two students of Congolese origin. Martin was also involved in matters of race relations in Charlotte, North Carolina.

Academic offices
Preceded by John Rood Cunningham	President of Davidson College; 1958–1968	Succeeded by Samuel Reid Spencer Jr.
