= Charles William Nassau =

American Presbyterian minister

The Reverend Charles William Nassau D.D.
- Nassau during his time at Lafayette College
- Born: April 12, 1804; Philadelphia, Pennsylvania
- Died: August 6, 1878 (aged 74); Trenton, New Jersey
- Occupation: Presbyterian minister
- Ordained: November 16, 1825
- Offices held: Lafayette College president 1849-1850

Reverend Charles William Nassau D.D., (April 12, 1804 – August 6, 1878) was a Presbyterian minister and the fourth president of Lafayette College serving from 1849 to 1850.

== Early life ==
Charles Nassau was born in Philadelphia, Pennsylvania in 1804 to Reverend William Nassau, a ruling elder at the Second Presbyterian Church in Philadelphia, and Ann Nassau (née Parkinson). The family descended from the Duchy of Nassau, through Charles Henry Von Nassau, the chief hunt master to Augustus II the Strong, the King of Saxony.

Nassau initially attended school at the University of Pennsylvania, graduating on July 26, 1821, and studied Hebrew the following year with a professor from the school. Nassau attended Princeton Theological Seminary for one year before leaving due to health problems, and completed his seminary with the Presbytery of Philadelphia on April 23, 1824. Nassau was ordained by the Presbytery on November 16, 1825.

== Career ==
After his ordainment, Nassau was a pastor in Norristown, Pennsylvania from 1825 to 1828, leaving due to another complaint with his health. From 1829 to 1833 he taught at an all-boys school in Philadelphia before overcoming his health issues and practicing as a pastor, again in Norristown, from 1832 to 1833.

Starting in 1836, Nassau became a professor of Latin and Greek at Marion College, in Hannibal, Missouri. He stayed here for two years before transferring to teach ancient languages at Lafayette College from 1841 to 1849.

In 1848, Lafayette College was under dire financial stress due to a lacking endowment. The previous president, George Junkin, resigned in the 1848 school year leaving the college without a president. In a state of emergency, Nassau was elected as president in 1849. Despite Nassau's education, he was unable to turn the financial situation around, and left the position in September, 1850 when debtors began to take legal action against the school.

After the presidency at Lafayette, Nassau became head of the Young Ladies' Seminary in Lawrenceville, New Jersey. He served in this position until 1875, and the seminary prospered well during his tenure. After 1875, Nassau resigned from this position to retire in Trenton, New Jersey.

== Personal life ==
Nassau married Hannah Hamill on April 11, 1826, with whom he had eleven children.

In 1850, Nassau was awarded an honorary Doctor of Divinity degree from Jefferson College (now Washington & Jefferson College).

He died in Trenton on August 6, 1878.

Academic offices
Preceded by George Junkin	President of Lafayette College; 1849–1850	Succeeded by Daniel V. McLean
