= Samuel Williamson (academic) =

2nd President of Davidson College
- In office 1841–1854
- Preceded by: Robert Hall Morrison
- Succeeded by: Drury Lacy Jr.

Personal details
- Born: June 12, 1795 York County, South Carolina
- Died: March 12, 1882 (aged 86) Hempstead County, Arkansas
- Education: University of South Carolina
- Profession: Pastor professor

Samuel Williamson (1795-1882) was the second president of Davidson College. After graduating from the University of South Carolina, Williamson entered the ministry. He arrived at Davidson in 1839 as a professor and then was appointed as president in 1841, becoming the longest serving president of the college during the 19th century. While president, Williamson steered the college through financial uncertainty while also building the Eumenean and Philanthropic Halls.

Academic offices
Preceded by Robert Hall Morrison	President of Davidson College; 1841–1854	Succeeded by Drury Lacy Jr.
