= John Lycan Kirkpatrick =

4th President of Davidson College
- In office 1860–1866
- Preceded by: Drury Lacy Jr.
- Succeeded by: George Wilson McPhail

Personal details
- Born: 1813
- Died: 1885 (aged 71–72)
- Education: Hampden-Sydney College; Union Theological Seminary
- Profession: Pastor

John Lycan Kirkpatrick (1813-1885) served as President of Davidson College from 1860 to 1866. Previously a minister from Virginia and formally educated at Hampden-Sydney College and Union Theological Seminary, Kirkpatrick entered the presidency on the eve of the American Civil War, which postponed Davidson's plans for growth and development. Kirkpatrick tasked with maintaining the financial solvency of the college and did so throughout the war.

Academic offices
Preceded by Drury Lacy Jr.	President of Davidson College; 1860-1866	Succeeded by George Wilson McPhail
