= Douglas A. Hicks =

American theologian

19th President of Davidson College
- Incumbent
- Assumed office August 1, 2022
- Preceded by: Carol Quillen

Personal details
- Education: Davidson College (BA); Duke University (MDiv); Harvard University (MA, PhD)
- Profession: Professor; Academic administrator

Douglas Alan Hicks is an American scholar of theology and ethics who is president of Davidson College.

Hicks became the 19th president of Davidson College on August 1, 2022. He previously served as Dean of Oxford College of Emory University and the Charles R. Kenan Jr. Professor of Religion at Emory. Before that, he was Professor of Religion and Senior Advisor for Academic Initiatives at Colgate University in Hamilton, New York. He served as Colgate's Provost and Dean of the Faculty from 2012 through 2015. From 1998 through 2012, Hicks was Professor of Leadership Studies and Religion at the Jepson School of Leadership Studies at the University of Richmond, where he also was the founding director of the Bonner Center for Civic Engagement.

== Education and career ==
Hicks graduated from Park Tudor School in 1986. He holds an A.B. degree with honors in economics from Davidson College, a Masters of Divinity degree, summa cum laude, from Duke University, and M.A. and Ph.D. degrees in religion, ethics and economics from Harvard University. During the spring of 2003, he served as visiting assistant professor of religion and society at Harvard Divinity School.

Hicks is an ordained minister in the Presbyterian Church (USA). He is the author of four books: Inequality and Christian Ethics (2000), Religion and the Workplace (2003), With God on All Sides: Leadership in a Devout and Diverse America (2009), and Money Enough: Everyday Practices for Living Faithfully in the Global Economy (2010).

His articles have appeared in The Leadership Quarterly, The Journal of Religious Ethics, World Development and The Journal of Ecumenical Studies.

== Works ==
- "Mr. Obama's Inauguration". Richmond Times-Dispatch. January 18, 2009.
- "Leadership in a Devout and Diverse City". Richmond Magazine. 2008-12-24.
- Douglas A. Hicks, Mark Valeri (2008). "Global Poverty and Bono's Celebrity Activism". Global Neighbors. Wm. B. Eerdmans Publishing. ISBN 978-0-8028-6033-0.

=== Books ===
- Money Enough: Everyday Practices for Living Faithfully in the Global Economy. Jossey-Bass. February 2010. ISBN 978-0-7879-9775-5.
- With God on All Sides: Leadership in a Devout and Diverse America. Cambridge University Press. February 12, 2009. ISBN 978-0-19-533717-4.
- Religion and the Workplace. Cambridge University Press. November 17, 2003. ISBN 978-0-521-52960-0.
- Inequality and Christian Ethics. Cambridge University Press. 2000. ISBN 978-0-521-78754-3.
