= Andrew Dousa Hepburn =

American university president (1830–1921)

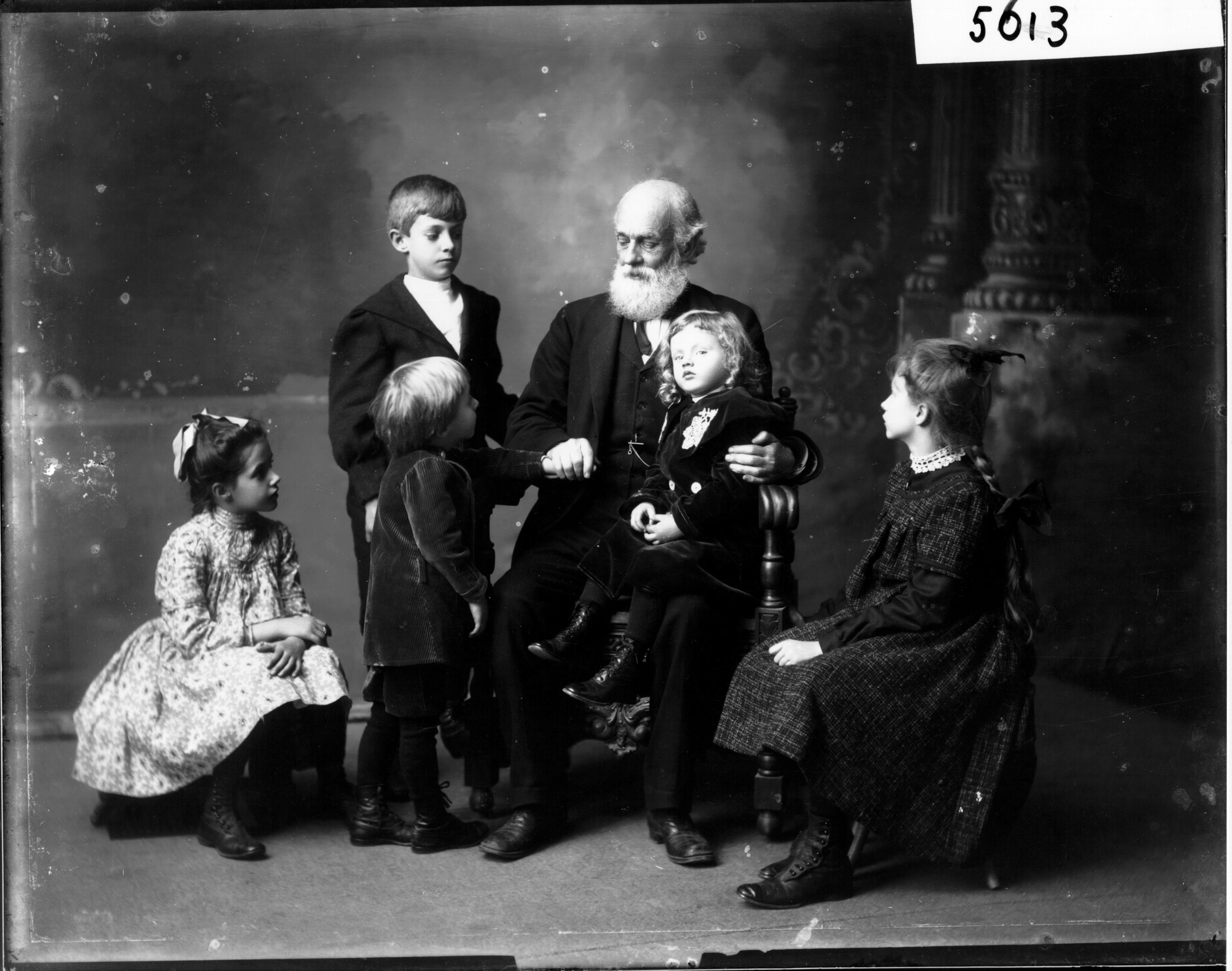
- Andrew Dousa Hepburn with his grandchildren (1903)

6th President of Davidson College
- In office 1877–1885
- Preceded by: John Rennie Blake
- Succeeded by: Luther McKinnon

Personal details
- Born: 1830 Carlisle, Pennsylvania
- Died: 1921 (aged 90–91)
- Education: University of Virginia; Princeton Theological Seminary
- Profession: Reverend; Professor; College President

Andrew Dousa Hepburn (November 14, 1830 – February 14, 1921) was a Presbyterian pastor, professor and president of Miami University and Davidson College.

Hepburn was born in Williamsport, Pennsylvania, to Samuel Hepburn, a lawyer and judge, and Rebecca Williamson. Hepburn grew up in Carlisle, Pennsylvania, before attending Jefferson College, Canonsburg; the University of Virginia; and Princeton University, from where he graduated with a degree in theology in 1857, the same year in which he married Henrietta McGuffey, daughter of William Holmes McGuffey. Together, they had two children: Henrietta Williamson Hepburn and Charles McGuffey Hepburn, an attorney who became dean of the Indiana University School of Law.

Hepburn became an ordained minister in the Presbyterian church the following year, 1858 before becoming a professor of metaphysics, logic, and rhetoric at the University of North Carolina in 1860. He sided with the Confederacy during the American Civil War, and in his capacity as pastor to the First Presbyterian Church in Wilmington he led the delegation that surrendered the city to Union forces. In his address at this event, many citizens of Wilmington considered that he was too conciliatory in attitude towards the Union side, but he seemed to emerge from this without too heavy criticism.

In 1865 he left the United States to study at the University of Berlin. Upon his return to America he took up a post firstly at Miami University in Ohio rising to the post of President in 1871 before moving to Davidson College back in North Carolina upon the closure of Miami University in 1873. In 1875 his work Manual of English Rhetoric was published, and two years later in 1877, he became Davidson's president. While president, he initiated curricular reforms, particularly in languages and Bible courses. He also taught courses in Latin and French and in Mental Philosophy and English Literature. He was the last Davidson College president to serve as the minister at Davidson College Presbyterian Church. In 1885 Miami University reopened and Hepburn accepted a post as Professor of English Literature there, which he held until his retirement in 1908.

Two different Hepburn Halls at Miami University have been named in his honor and three times in his life he received honorary degrees, once from Jefferson College in 1860, once from Hampden-Sydney College in 1876 and once from the University of North Carolina in 1881. Hepburn died on February 14, 1921, in Oxford, Ohio.

Academic offices
Preceded by John Rennie Blake	President of Davidson College; 1877-1885	Succeeded by Luther McKinnon

Preceded by Robert L. Stanton	President of Miami University; 1871-1873	Succeeded by Robert White McFarland
