= D. G. Martin =

American lawyer and politician (1940–2025)

- Born: David Grier Martin Jr. May 24, 1940; Atlanta, Georgia, U.S.
- Died: December 9, 2025 (aged 85)
- Education: Davidson College (BA); Yale University (JD)
- Political party: Democratic
- Children: 2, including Grier
- Father: David Grier Martin

David Grier Martin Jr. (May 24, 1940 – December 9, 2025) was an American lawyer, politician and university administrator. Martin was a candidate for the United States House of Representatives in 1984 and 1986, losing to Alex McMillan. Martin later served as Secretary and a Vice President for the University of North Carolina system and has served as the host of North Carolina Bookwatch, a public access television show.

== Early life and education ==
Born in Atlanta on May 24, 1940, Martin grew up in Davidson, North Carolina, where his father, David Grier Martin, served as president of Davidson College from 1958 to 1968. Martin attended Davidson, where he played on the basketball team for Lefty Driesell. After graduating, he was commissioned in the United States Army. Following completion of Airborne School, Martin served in the United States Army Special Forces. After leaving active duty, he graduated from Yale Law School.

== Career ==
After graduating from law school, Martin established a legal practice in Charlotte, North Carolina.

In 1984 and 1986, Martin narrowly lost two races for Congress to Alex McMillan. He later served as both the Secretary and a Vice President for the University of North Carolina system. In 1998, he ran for the U.S. Senate, finishing second to John Edwards in the Democratic primary. After that race, Martin took on interim leadership positions at North Carolina Central University, the University of North Carolina at Pembroke, The Trust for Public Land, and the N.C. Clean Water Management Trust Fund.

Martin wrote a weekly column that appeared in over 40 newspapers across North Carolina, including The Raleigh Telegram, The Chapel Hill News, The Chatham Journal, The Elkin Tribune, Mountain Xpress, The Pilot, and The Randolph Guide. From 1999 until 2021, Martin hosted North Carolina Bookwatch, a literary television show on UNC-TV, North Carolina’s public television network. He also hosted a weekly radio interview show on 97.9 FM and 1360 AM radio station WCHL in Chapel Hill and is the author of "Interstate Eateries," a guide to local restaurants in North Carolina. In 2020, the North Caroliniana Society awarded him the North Caroliniana Society Award for his long career in public service.

== Personal life and death ==
Martin was married and had two children: former state legislator and North Carolina Secretary for Military and Veterans Affairs, Grier Martin, and May Martin Bryan. In his free time, Martin was a keen runner and completed several marathons. He died on December 9, 2025, at the age of 85.
