= List of presidents of Davidson College =

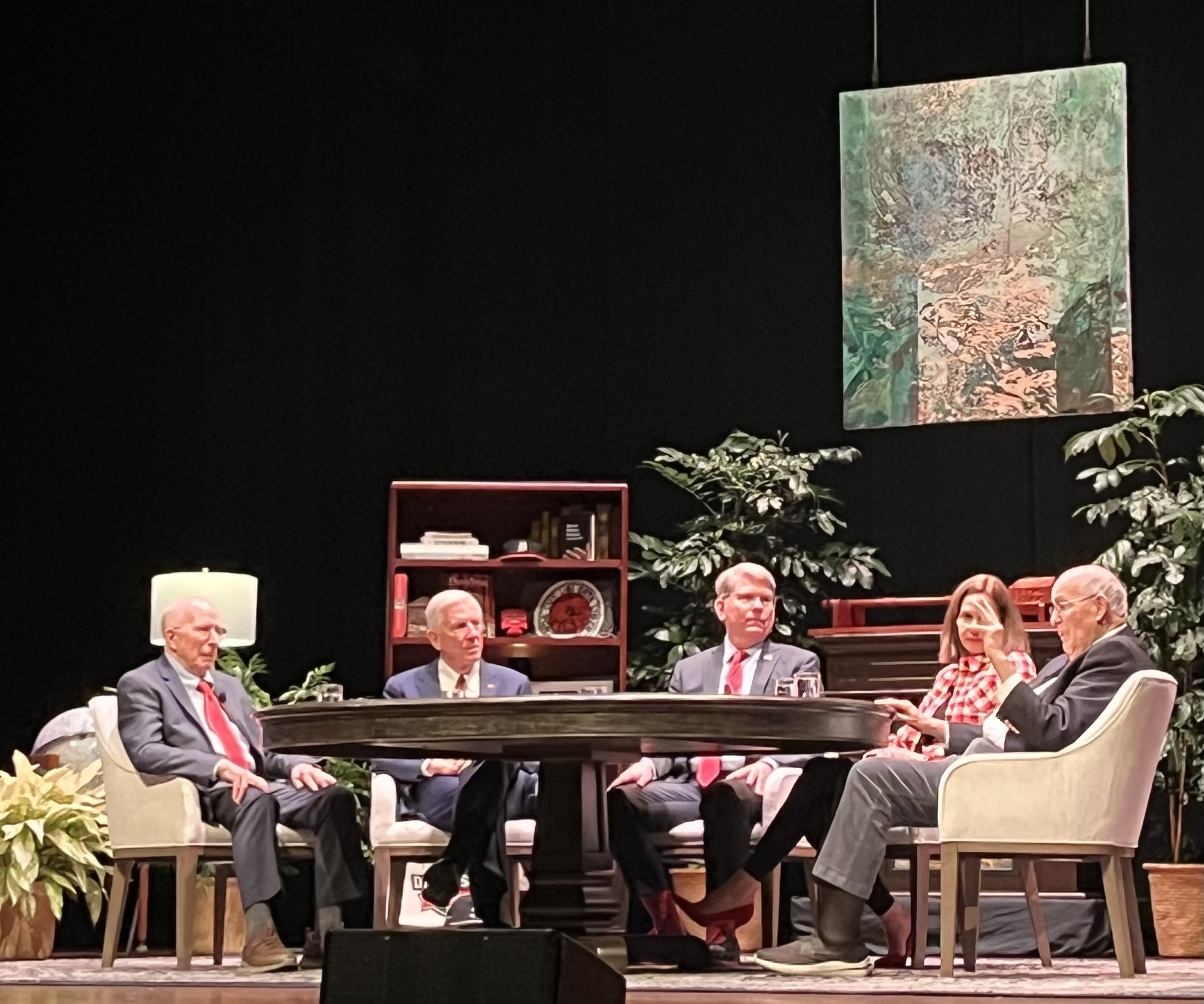
Presidents Bobby Vagt, Tom Ross, Doug Hicks, Carrol Quillen, and John Kuykendall (left to right) at a roundtable discussion in February 2026

The following is a list of the presidents of Davidson College, which began operating in 1837 in Davidson, North Carolina.

	Presidents of Davidson College	Years as president
1	Reverend Robert Hall Morrison	1836–1840
2	Reverend Samuel Williamson (academic)	1841–1854
3	Reverend Drury Lacy, Jr.	1855–1860
4	Reverend John Lycan Kirkpatrick	1860–1866
5	Reverend George Wilson McPhail	1866–1871
-	John Rennie Blake	1871–1877
6	Reverend Andrew Dousa Hepburn	1877–1885
7	Reverend Luther McKinnon	1885–1888
–	Colonel William Joseph Martin	1887–1888, Acting President
8	Reverend John Bunyan Shearer	1888–1901
9	Henry Louis Smith	1901–1912
10	William Joseph Martin, Jr.	1912–1929
11	Reverend Walter Lee Lingle	1929–1941
12	John Rood Cunningham	1941–1957
–	Professor Clarence John Pietenpol	1957–1958, Acting President
13	David Grier Martin	1958–1968
–	Professor Frontis Withers Johnston	1968, Acting President
14	Samuel Reid Spencer, Jr.	1968–1983
–	Professor Frontis Withers Johnston	1983–1984, Acting President
15	John Kuykendall	1984–1997
16	Robert F. Vagt	1997–2007
17	Thomas W. Ross	2007–2010
–	John Kuykendall	2010, Acting President
18	Carol Quillen	2011–2022
19	Douglas A. Hicks	2022–Present
