= William Joseph Martin Jr. =

Former President of Davidson College

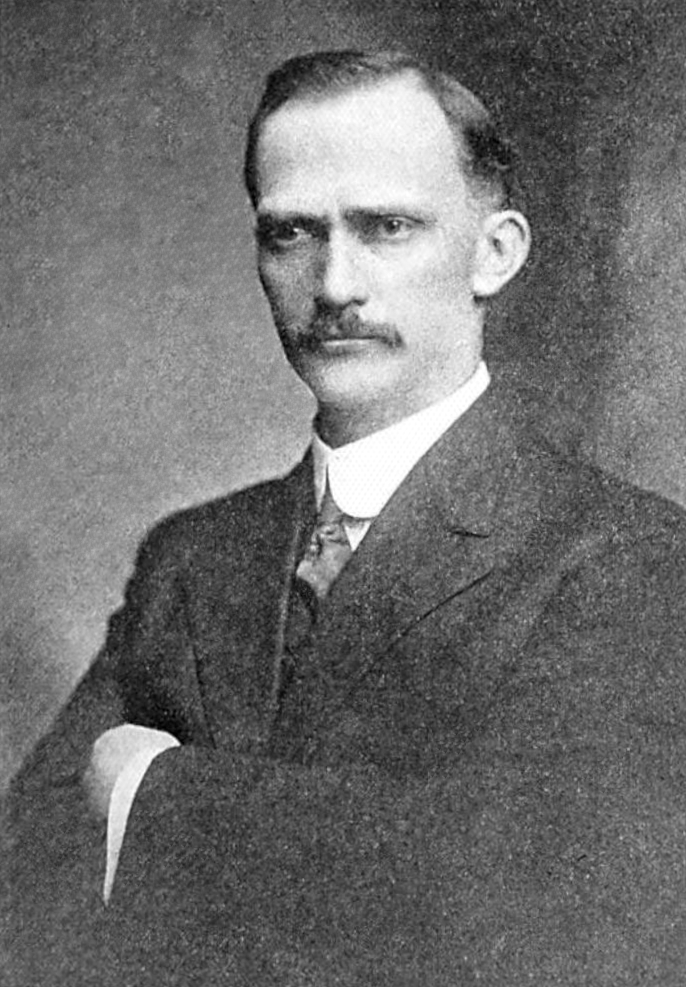

10th President of Davidson College
- In office 1912–1929
- Preceded by: Henry Louis Smith
- Succeeded by: Walter Lee Lingle

Personal details
- Born: February 10, 1868 Columbia, Tennessee, US
- Died: September 7, 1943 (aged 75) Davidson, North Carolina, US
- Education: Davidson College; University of Virginia; Johns Hopkins University
- Profession: Professor

William Joseph Martin Jr. (1868–1943) was the tenth president of Davidson College, being installed as president in 1912.

== Biography ==
Martin, the son of a Confederate veteran who was also a professor at Davidson, graduated from Davidson in 1888. After receiving advanced degrees from the University of Virginia and further instruction at Johns Hopkins University, Martin eventually found his way back to Davidson as a chemistry professor.

As president, Martin steered the college through World War I, when many students left college to fight, by bringing a Student Army Training Corps program to campus. Also, the main academic building, Chambers Building, burned down but Martin was able to secure funding to replace the building. Martin also established a relationship with the Duke Endowment, a relationship that exists still today.

After his retirement, Martin left to work in the PCUSA training school, but returned to Davidson to teach.

The main chemistry building at Davidson is named in honor of both Martin and his father, William Joseph Martin Sr.

Academic offices
Preceded by Henry Louis Smith	President of Davidson College; 1912–1929	Succeeded by Walter Lee Lingle
