= Sigma Xi =

Honor society for science and engineering

- ΣΞ
- Founded: November 1886; 139 years ago Cornell University
- Type: Honor
- Affiliation: HSC
- Former affiliation: ACHS
- Status: Active
- Emphasis: Science and Engineering
- Scope: International
- Motto: Σπουδῶν Ξυνῶνες; Spoudon Xynones "Companions in Zealous Research"
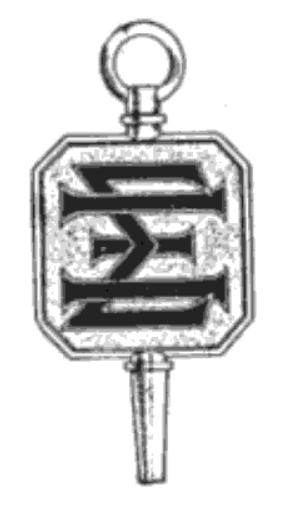
- Member badge
- Colors: Electric blue and White
- Publication: American Scientist
- Chapters: 370 active, 170 inactive
- Members: 60,000 lifetime
- Headquarters: 3200 East NC Highway 54; Suite 300; Research Triangle Park, North Carolina 27709; United States
- Website: www.sigmaxi.org

Sigma Xi, The Scientific Research Honor Society (ΣΞ) (/ˈsɪɡmə/ /zaɪ/) is an international non-profit honor society for scientists and engineers. Sigma Xi was founded at Cornell University by a faculty member and graduate students in 1886 and is one of the oldest honor societies. Membership in Sigma Xi is by invitation only, where members nominate others on the basis of their research achievements or potential. The society was a founding member of the Association of College Honor Societies in 1925, but withdrew in 1933 and, much later, helped form the Honor Society Caucus.

== History ==
Sigma Xi was founded in November 1886 at the Sibley College of Mechanical Engineering at Cornell University in Ithaca, New York. Its founders were Henry Shaler Williams, a Cornell faculty member, junior faculty Frank Van Vleck, and engineering graduate students John J. Berger, William A. Day, John Knickerbacker, William A. Mosscrop, William H. Riley, William N. Sanderson, Henry E. Smith, and Charles B. Wing. Their goal was to create a scientific society comparable to Phi Beta Kappa. The society's primary objective was to acknowledge significant scientific research and foster cooperation among scientists from various disciplines. Williams was its first president.

In 1887, Sigma Xi became a national organization, establishing chapters at Stevens Institute of Technology, Rutgers College, Rensselaer Polytechnic Institute, and Union College. It 1888, began inducting female members, including Anna Botsford Comstock and Susanna Phelps Gage. The society held its first convention in Ithaca in 1893, where its members drafted a new constitution. In 1899, it held its convention in conjunction with that of American Association for the Advancement of Science. At the end of the 19th century, Sigma Xi consisted of over 1,000 members in eight chapters.

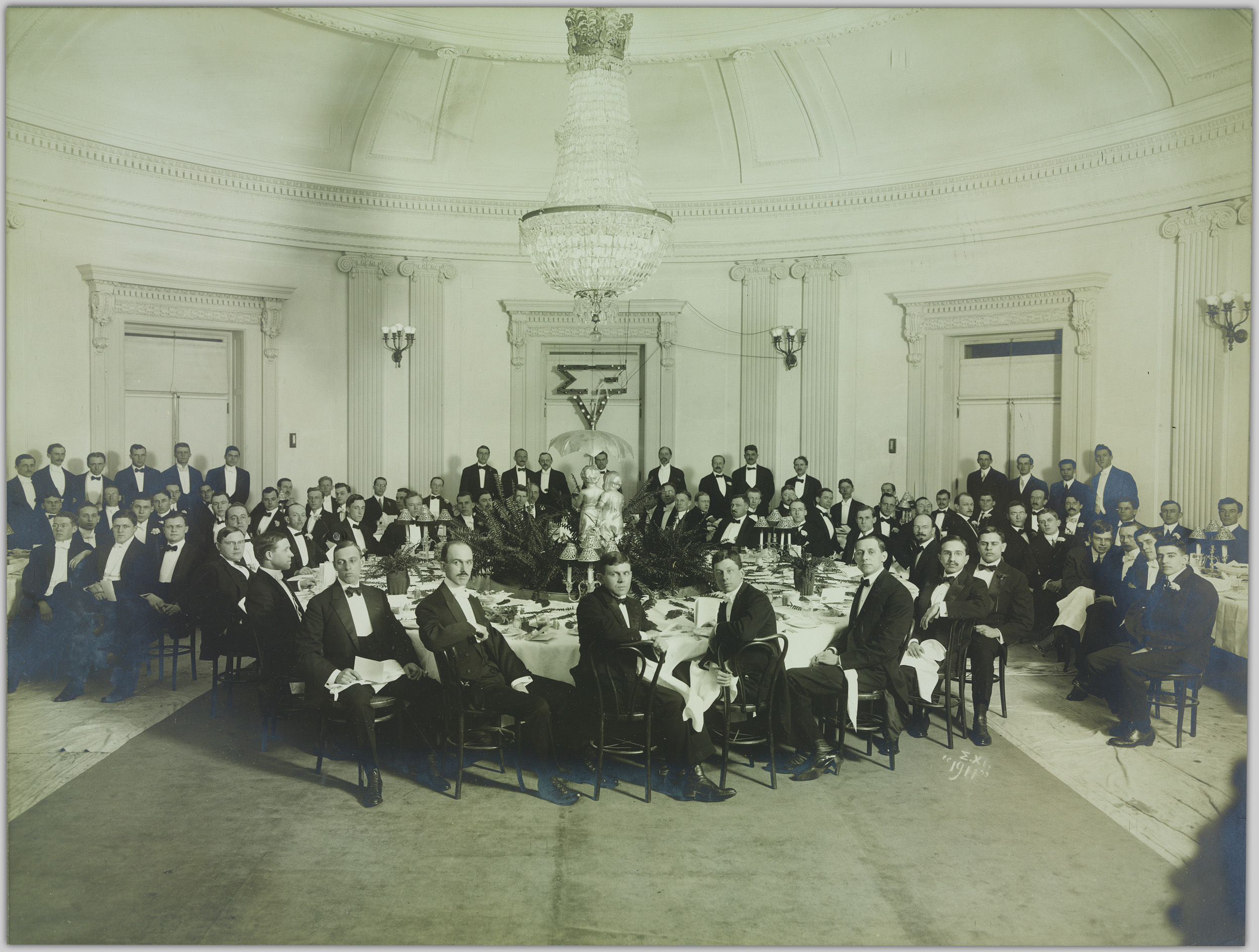
Sigma Xi dinner at Yale University circa 1911

In the early 20th century, following the 1906 San Francisco earthquake, Sigma Xi's Stanford University and University of California, Berkeley chapters were involved in reconstruction and public health initiatives. During World War I, the National Research Council collaborated with Sigma Xi to organize research facilities. The society expanded significantly after the war, and by 1930, it had 20,000 members.

Sigma Xi was one of six honor societies that co-founded the Association of College Honor Societies (ACHS) on December 30, 1925. Its participation was short lived, with the decision to withdraw and operate again as an independent society made just over a decade later, effective in 1933. It resigned from ACHS because "it had decided to devote itself to research primarily, that it no longer considered itself a strictly college organization, and hence was somewhat outside of the field occupied by the Association, and that for these reasons it felt constrained to withdraw from the Association."

Sigma Xi initiated the Distinguished Lectureships Program in the late 1930s to promote its activities and research findings. By 1950, the society's membership numbered 42,000. In 1947, it formed the Scientific Research Society of America (RESA), which was created to support research in various settings. Member Thomas T. Holme became the society's executive secretary in 1953 through 1981, steering Sigma Xi through rapid growth and societal changes. In 1963, the society had 139 chapters and 175,000 members.

Sigma Xi and RESA combined on January 1, 1974, under the name Sigma Xi, The Scientific Research Society. In 1989, Sigma Xi revised its mission statement, emphasizing the importance of science and its role in society. The society remains committed to recognizing scientific achievements and promoting global collaboration in science and technology.

Sigma Xi participates in a loosely coordinated lobbying association of four of the nation's oldest and most prestigious honor societies, called the Honor Society Caucus, with Phi Beta Kappa, Phi Kappa Phi, Sigma Xi, and Omicron Delta Kappa. Sigma Xi has nearly 60,000 members who were elected to membership based on their research achievements and potential. The society's headquarters is in Research Triangle Park, North Carolina.

== Symbols ==
The Greek letters ΣΞ form the acronym of the society's motto, Σπουδῶν Ξυνῶνες or Spoudon Xynones, which translates as "Companions in Zealous Research." According to Sigma Xi president Tee L. Guidotti,

"Sigma Xi, of course, is our basic name and has been since the organization was founded in 1886 as the scientific and engineering counterpart to Phi Beta Kappa. Like all "Greek letter" societies, whether professional or social, it is an acronym for the motto of the organization, Σπουδων Ξυνωνες (Spoudon Xynones), which translates as "companions in Zealous Research." For many years, we were referred to as "Society of the Sigma Xi." In the early twentieth century, some in the leadership wanted "Sigma Xi" to be dropped altogether in favor of some formulation such as "Scientific Research Society of America." In a strange quirk of history, both names survived because the organization split in the 1940s into an academic honor society (Sigma Xi) and an honor society for applied research and engineering (the Scientific Research Society of America, called RESA). RESA was a separate entity, wholly owned by Sigma Xi, and represented engineers and scientists at non-academic institutions, such as government and industrial research laboratories. In an even stranger development, Sigma Xi and RESA merged back together in 1974 and eventually began calling itself Sigma Xi, The Scientific Research Society."

The Sigma Xi badge is a watch chain pendant consisting of a monogram of the Greek letters ΣΞ. The society's colors are electric blue and white. Its members may wear blue and white honor cords at graduation. Its publication is American Scientist.

== Membership ==
Membership in Sigma Xi is by invitation only, where members nominate others on the basis of their research achievements or potential. The society's membership consists of faculty and staff who have contributed to noteworthy research in a scientific field, undergraduate students who have excellence in the study of science, and graduate students who have demonstrated excellence in applied or pure science fields.

== Activities ==
In addition to publishing American Scientist magazine, Sigma Xi provides grants annually to promising young researchers. It also sponsors a variety of programs and lectures supporting ethics in research, science and engineering education, the public understanding of science, international research cooperation and the overall health of the research enterprise.

=== William Procter Prizes ===
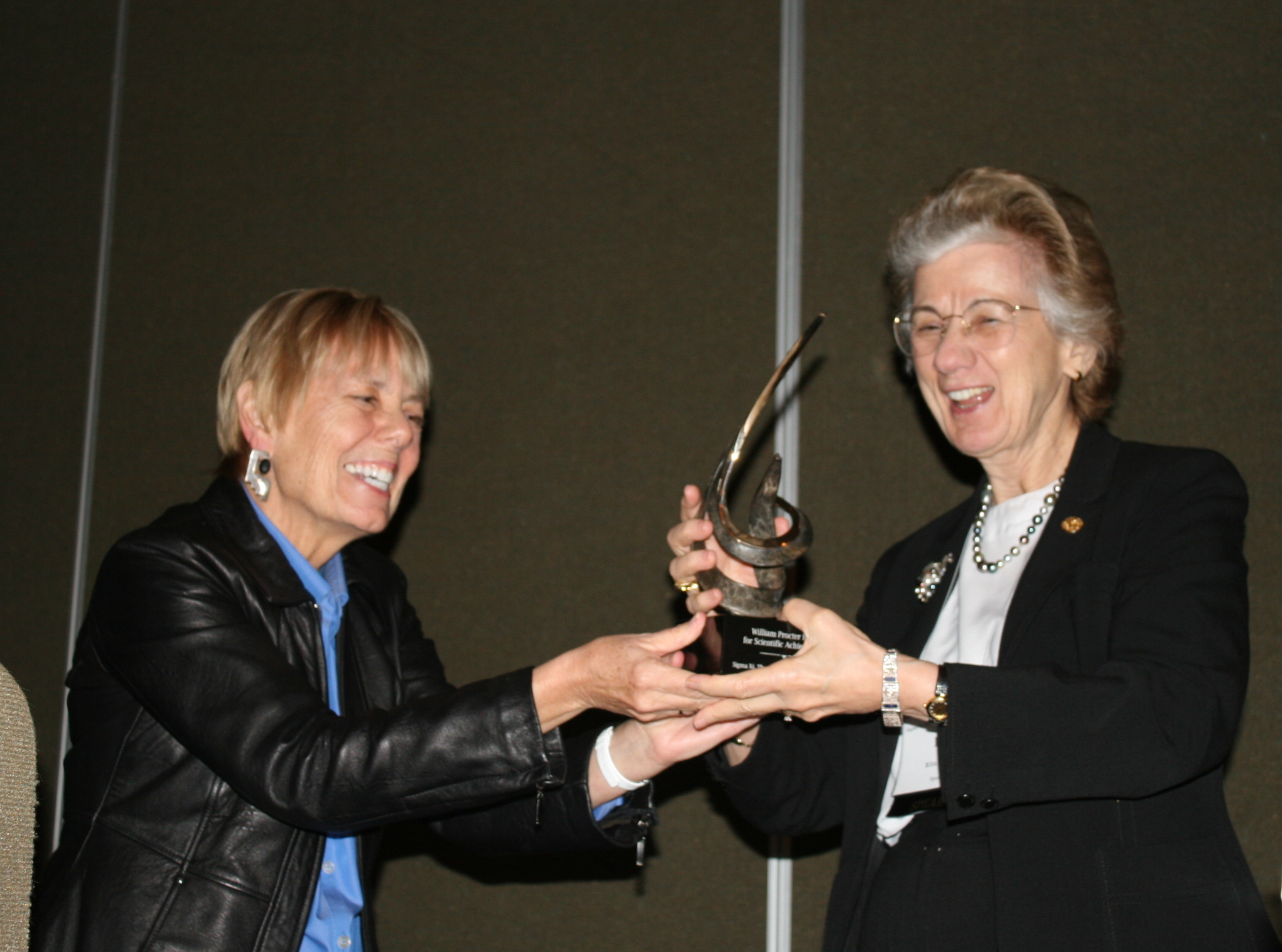
William Procter Prize awarded to Rita Colwell by Sigma Xi

The William Procter Prize for Scientific Achievement is an award presented by Sigma Xi. This prestigious prize is given to a scientist who has made an outstanding contribution to scientific research and has demonstrated an ability to communicate the significance of this research to scientists in other disciplines.

The prize was established in 1950 in honor of William Procter, a distinguished business leader and philanthropist who had a strong commitment to scientific research and development. Procter was an heir to the Procter & Gamble Company and served as its president and chairman.

Recipients of the William Procter Prize are recognized for their achievements in both research and communication, reflecting the dual emphasis of Sigma Xi on promoting both scientific excellence and interdisciplinary communication. Along with the recognition, the awardee also delivers a lecture at the society's annual meeting or another appropriate occasion.

Over the years, the William Procter Prize has been awarded to many notable scientists from a wide range of disciplines, underscoring the prize's commitment to honoring and promoting interdisciplinary research.

== Chapters ==
As of May 4, 2023, it has chartered more than 550 chapters, with 350 active chapters in the United States and over 20 chapters in other countries.

== Notable members ==
More than 200 winners of the Nobel Prize have been Sigma Xi members, including Francis Crick, Jennifer Doudna, Albert Einstein, Enrico Fermi, Richard Feynman, John Goodenough, Linus Pauling, and James Watson.

== See also ==
- Honor cords
- Honor society
- Professional fraternities and sororities
