= John Rennie Blake =

Faculty chairman in charge of Davidson College from 1871 to 1877

Faculty Chairman
- In office 1871–1877
- Preceded by: Drury Lacy Jr.
- Succeeded by: Andrew Dousa Hepburn

Personal details
- Born: December 6, 1825 Greenwood, South Carolina
- Died: June 8, 1900 (aged 74)
- Education: University of Georgia; Lawrence Scientific School
- Profession: Professor

John Rennie Blake (1825–1900) was the faculty chairman in charge of Davidson College from 1871 to 1877.

After the death of George Wilson McPhail, the position of president was vacated as the college opted to elect a faculty member, Blake, to oversee the college until Andrew Dousa Hepburn was appointed in 1877. Because Blake was not an ordained minister, he was ineligible to become president according to the college's constitution. It was during his tenure that Woodrow Wilson and Robert Broadnax Glenn enrolled as students.

Academic offices
Preceded by George Wilson McPhail	President of Davidson College; 1871–1877	Succeeded by Andrew Dousa Hepburn
