= Robert Hall Morrison =

American academic

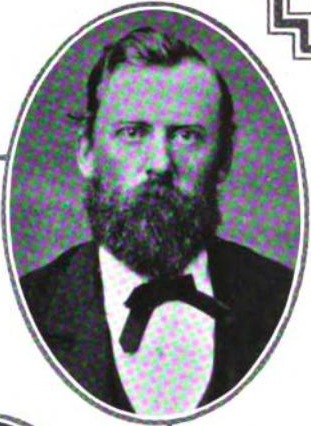

1st President of Davidson College
- In office 1836–1840
- Succeeded by: Samuel Williamson

Personal details
- Born: September 8, 1798
- Died: May 13, 1889 (aged 90)
- Spouse: Mary Graham Morrison
- Children: 12
- Education: University of North Carolina; Princeton University
- Profession: Pastor

Robert Hall Morrison (1798-1889) was the first president of Davidson College. Morrison, originally from Cabarrus County, North Carolina, enrolled at the University of North Carolina at Chapel Hill, eventually graduating second in the class, behind future President James K. Polk. After graduating, Morrison studied for a year at Princeton College and entered the ministry before being appointed as president of Davidson. Morrison taught mathematics and science courses at the college. After a year as president, a typhoid fever or diphtheria epidemic swept through the area, taking two of his children. Morrison would later become ill and resign from the position in 1840, eventually retiring in 1849.

Although he claimed to be a “Union man at heart,” Presbyterian pastor and Davidson College's first president “claimed ownership of multiple enslaved people who were forced to work on the college grounds, and would eventually become a staunch supporter of the Confederacy.” The Morrison family arrived on campus with at least two enslaved people and kept at least three to work the grounds. “These individuals, named Mary, Sarah, and Bagwell, are some of the few enslaved people at the college who are identified in college materials.”

He married Mary Graham, a Lincolnton, North Carolina resident, in 1824. Mary Graham had attended Salem Female Academy between 1815 and 1816 in what would later become Winston-Salem. They had 12 children, including Isabella Sophia, who married Confederate general Daniel Harvey Hill, Mary Anna, second spouse of Confederate general Thomas "Stonewall" Jackson, Eugenia Erixene, who died in 1858 after marrying future Confederate general Rufus Barringer four years prior, and Joseph Graham, who graduated from the Virginia Military Institute in 1865 and was an aide-de-camp to Jackson while a cadet. His oldest son, William Wilberforce, was a secretary to North Carolina governor William A. Graham in the antebellum period, served the Confederacy and died of complications from exposure (Note: Probably hypothermia) in November 1865.

== Notes ==
Academic offices
Preceded by Position Created	President of Davidson College; 1836–1840	Succeeded by Samuel Williamson (academic)
