= Walter Lee Lingle =

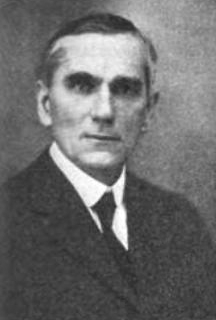

11th President of Davidson College
- In office 1929–1941
- Preceded by: William Joseph Martin Jr.
- Succeeded by: John Rood Cunningham

Personal details
- Born: October 3, 1868 Rowan County, North Carolina, US
- Died: September 19, 1956 (aged 87) Mooresville, North Carolina, US
- Spouse: Alice Merle Dupuy (m. 1900)
- Children: Louise Denton, Nan Russell, Walter Lee Jr., Caroline Dudley
- Education: Davidson College; Union Theological Seminary
- Profession: Pastor professor

Walter Lee Lingle (1868–1956) was the 11th president of Davidson College. Lingle graduated from Davidson in 1892 and proceeded to receive his training at Union Theological Seminary. After spending a few years in the ministry, Lingle was elected to the board of trustees and eventually was appointed as president in 1929.

Lingle was able to steer Davidson during the Great Depression. The college was able to run without a deficit, cutting salaries, or releasing faculty members, in addition to overseeing several major construction projects on campus.

== Biography ==
Walter Lee Lingle was born on October 3, 1868. He married Alice Merle Dupuy on January 2, 1900, and they had four children.

He died in Mooresville, North Carolina on September 19, 1956.

Academic offices
Preceded by William Joseph Martin Jr.	President of Davidson College; 1929–1941	Succeeded by John Rood Cunningham
