= Honor Society Caucus =

Greek letter umbrella organization

- Type: Umbrella
- Affiliation: Independent
- Status: Active
- Emphasis: Collegiate honor societies
- Scope: North America
- Chapters: 4 societies
- Headquarters: United States

The Honor Society Caucus is an umbrella organization of four collegiate honor societies: Phi Beta Kappa, Sigma Xi, Phi Kappa Phi, and Omicron Delta Kappa. The caucus is a coordinating organization of four of the oldest independent honor societies, including three of the original six founding members of the Association of College Honor Societies.

== Members ==
Society	Greek letters	Founded	Discipline	References
Phi Beta Kappa	ΦΒΚ	December 5, 1776	Liberal arts	
Sigma Xi	ΣΞ	November 1886	Scientific research	
Phi Kappa Phi	ΦΚΦ	March 15, 1897	All fields	
Omicron Delta Kappa	ΟΔΚ	December 3, 1914	Leadership and scholarship	
