= John Bunyan Shearer =

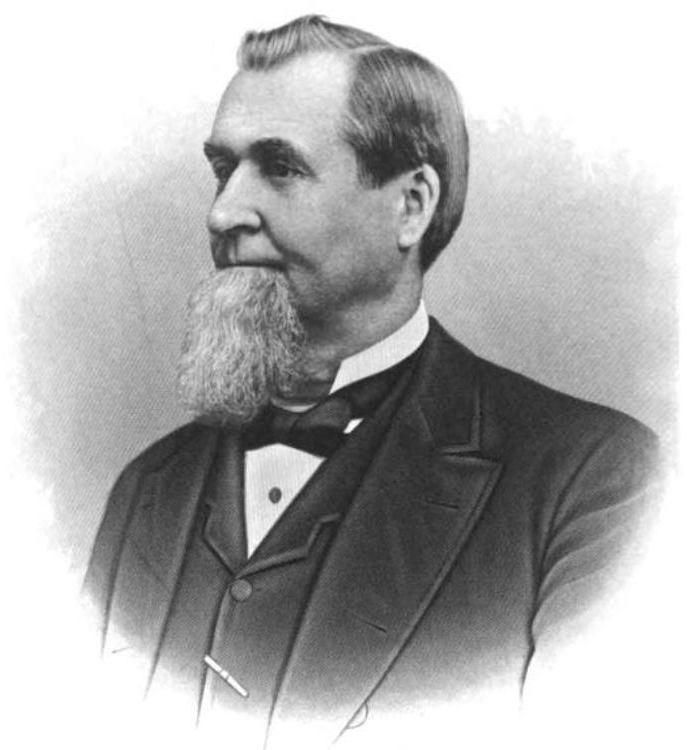

8th President of Davidson College
- In office 1888–1901
- Preceded by: Luther McKinnon
- Succeeded by: Henry Louis Smith

Personal details
- Born: July 19, 1832; Appomattox County, Virginia
- Died: June 14, 1919 (aged 86); Davidson, North Carolina
- Education: Hampden-Sydney College; University of Virginia; Union Theological Seminary
- Profession: Pastor professor college president
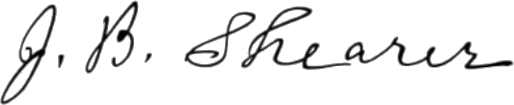
- Signature

John Bunyan Shearer (1832–1919) was the eighth president of Davidson College.

== Biography ==
John Bunyan Shearer was born in Appomattox County, Virginia on July 19, 1832. He completed his undergraduate studies at Hampden–Sydney College in 1851 and eventually entered the ministry. After the American Civil War, Shearer became president of Stewart College in Clarksville, Tennessee, which would later become Rhodes College. Shearer became president of Davidson in 1888; he focused particularly on public relations and fundraising. As president, Shearer spearheaded on renovating buildings and included mandatory Bible classes for students. Shearer's health would force him to resign, although he remained at Davidson in the administration.

He died in Davidson on June 14, 1919.

Academic offices
| Preceded by Luther McKinnon | President of Davidson College; 1888–1901 | Succeeded by Henry Louis Smith |
