= George McLendon =

Former Provost of Rice University
- In office 2010–2015
- Preceded by: Eugene Levy
- Succeeded by: Marie Lynn Miranda

Personal details
- Born: June 6, 1952 (age 72); Fort Worth, Texas
- Spouse: Carol Quillen

George McLendon was the Howard R. Hughes Provost and a Professor of Chemistry at Rice University. McLendon holds a bachelor's degree from the University of Texas at El Paso and a doctorate from Texas A&M University. He assumed the role of provost from 2010-2015 after serving as Dean of Trinity College of Arts and Science at Duke University. Prior to his tenure at Duke, McLendon was the R.W. Moore Professor and chair of the Department of Chemistry at Princeton University.

McLendon's research is focused on inorganic and physical biochemistry. He has published over 200 peer reviewed papers and received national research awards, including the ACS Award in Pure Chemistry, the Eli Lilly Award in Biological Chemistry, Sloan Dreyfus Award, and Guggenheim Fellowships. His publications range from solar nanotechnology to cell death pathways. His most recent research has direct implications for the diagnosis and treatment of cancer and other diseases. He has been involved in launching several biotech startups, including Tetralogic Pharmaceuticals.

As provost, McLendon outlined a broad strategy called "The Rice Initiatives." The initiatives encompass three main areas of focus: bioscience and health, energy and the environment, and international strategy. He is also pursuing an international strategy for expanding Rice's image abroad.
