= George Wilson McPhail =

Presbyterian minister and educator

The Reverend George Wilson McPhail
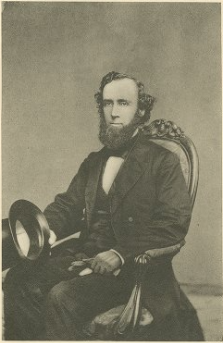
- McPhail in 1854
- Born: December 26, 1815; Norfolk, Virginia, U.S.
- Died: June 28, 1871 (aged 55); Davidson, North Carolina, U.S.
- Education: Hampden–Sydney College; Yale University
- Occupation: Presbyterian minister
- Offices held: Lafayette College president 1857–1863; Princeton Theological Seminary director 1860–1866; Davidson College president 1867–1871

George Wilson McPhail (December 26, 1815 – June 28, 1871) was an American Presbyterian minister and educator who served as the sixth president of Lafayette College, a director at Princeton Theological Seminary, and the fifth president of Davidson College.

== Early life and education ==
McPhail was born in Norfolk, Virginia on December 26, 1815. He attended Hampden–Sydney College for a period of two years prior to entering Yale University, where he graduated in 1835. After college, McPhail returned to Virginia, where he studied theology at Union Presbyterian Seminary in Richmond, Virginia.

== Career ==
=== Preacher ===
After his ordainment, McPhail was called upon to preach at a number of Episcopalian churches, leaving at various times due to health problems. He started in Prince George County, Virginia before moving to Buckingham, Virginia, Fredericksburg, Virginia, and finally the Brainard Church in Easton, Pennsylvania.

=== Lafayette College ===
In 1857, while preaching Brainard Church, he was elected president of nearby Lafayette College, where he served until 1863. While at Lafayette, McPhail worked with Francis March, who was previously appointed as an instructor to the school under the tutelage of former president Daniel V. McLean, on recommendation from McPhail. March, a revolutionary academic, was the first individual to teach English in a college setting, and McPhail was instrumental in creating courses specific to the philological study of the English language - something every other American college afterwards began to do.

During the 1861 school year, and with the advent of the American Civil War, Lafayette saw a drastic decrease in enrollment. Though interest in the school began again after the Battle of Antietam, it waned again following General Robert E. Lee's invasion of Pennsylvania, leaving Lafayette with nearly no pupils. Commencement in 1863 did not take place since there were an insufficient number students capable of graduating. Seniors who joined the Union Army ended up graduating the following year. Due to the financial pressures of a college without students, McPhail resigned in 1863.

=== Davidson College ===
After Lafayette, McPhail taught at an all-ladies seminary in Philadelphia before taking on the role as president at Davidson College in 1867. While at Davidson, McPhail took gratification in leading many students into the church of Christ, many of whom later joined the ministry. During his time at Davidson, McPhail's condition slowly worsened, but he was able to continue fulfilling his obligations until a short time before his death.

== Death ==
In 1871, he became ill while signing diplomas, and died prior to commencement that year.

== Personal life ==
McPhail married Mary C. Page in December 1840. Together they had four children, though three died while McPhail was still alive, causing him much grief.

In 1857, McPhail was awarded with an honorary degree of Doctor of Divinity from Jefferson College.

McPhail died on June 28, 1871, in Davidson, North Carolina at the age of 55.

Academic offices
Preceded by Daniel V. McLean	President of Lafayette College; 1857–1863	Succeeded by William Cassady Cattell
Preceded by John Lycan Kirkpatrick	President of Davidson College; 1866-1871	Succeeded by John Rennie Blake
