= Henry Louis Smith =

American college president (1859–1951)

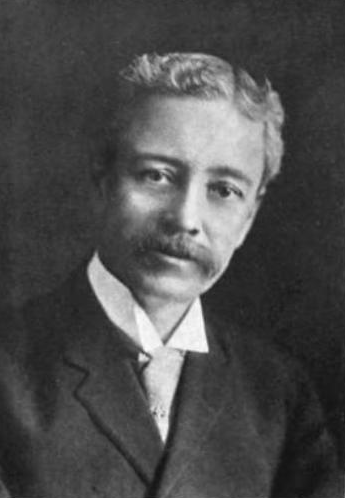

9th President of Davidson College
- In office 1901–1912
- Preceded by: John Bunyan Shearer
- Succeeded by: William Joseph Martin Jr.

17th President of Washington and Lee University
- In office 1912–1929

Personal details
- Born: July 30, 1859 Greensboro, North Carolina
- Died: February 17, 1951 (aged 91) Greensboro, North Carolina
- Education: Davidson College; University of Virginia
- Profession: Professor
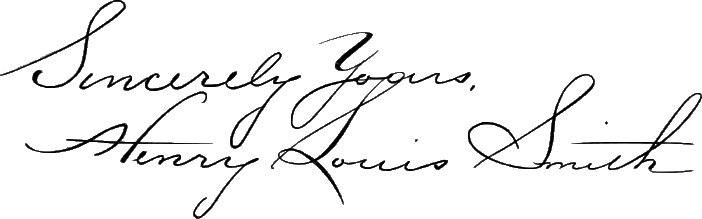
- Signature

Henry Louis Smith (July 30, 1859 – February 27, 1951) was an American academic administrator, educator, and physicist. He was president of Davidson College and of Washington and Lee University. He was a pioneer in the use of the X-ray machine and psychological warfare.

== Early life ==
Smith was born on July 30, 1859, in Greensboro, North Carolina. His was the son of Mary Kelly (née Watson) and Dr. Jacob Henry Smith, a Presbyterian minister.

He graduated from Presbyterian High School, operated by his uncle in Greensboro. Smith enrolled Davidson College in 1877, graduating in 1881. He was a member of Phi Delta Theta and Phi Beta Kappa.

He received an MA in physics from the University of Virginia in 1887, followed by a Ph.D in physics in 1890.

== Career ==
Starting in 1881, Smith was principal of Selma Academy for five years. He then returned to Davidson as a professor of natural science (physics and astronomy). During his time as a professor, Smith and his students created one of the first X-ray images in America. However, he took two leaves of absence to complete master's and Ph.D degrees.

Smith became the president of Davidson College in 1901. He was the college's first president who was not a Presbyterian minister. During his administration, he oversaw construction and infrastructure projects, including the establishment of the first electric light plant in town and the construction of several dormitories and academic buildings.

Smith left Davidson in 1912 to become president of Washington and Lee University in Lexington, Virginia. While there, he helped found the Omicron Delta Kappa honor society.

During World War I, Smith invented a way to use air-carried balloons to drop propaganda messages in Austria and Germany. For this pioneering invention in psychological warfare, he received an award from the American Security League. President Woodrow Wilson credited Smith with doing the most to bring World War I to a close.

Smith retired and became president emeritus in 1929.

== Personal life ==
Smith married Julia Lorraine DuPuy of Davidson in 1896. She was the daughter of John James DuPuy, a physician. The couple had eight children.

Smith was a Presbyterian elder; he also taught Bible classes. He was a popular public speaker, wrote a local newspaper column, and published This Troubled Century in 1947.

After retiring, Smith returned to Greensboro. He died at his home in Greensboro on February 27, 1951. He was buried in Forest Lawn Cemetery.

Academic offices
| Preceded by John Bunyan Shearer | President of Davidson College; 1901–1912 | Succeeded by William Joseph Martin Jr. |
