= Daniel V. McLean =

The Reverend Daniel Veech McLean
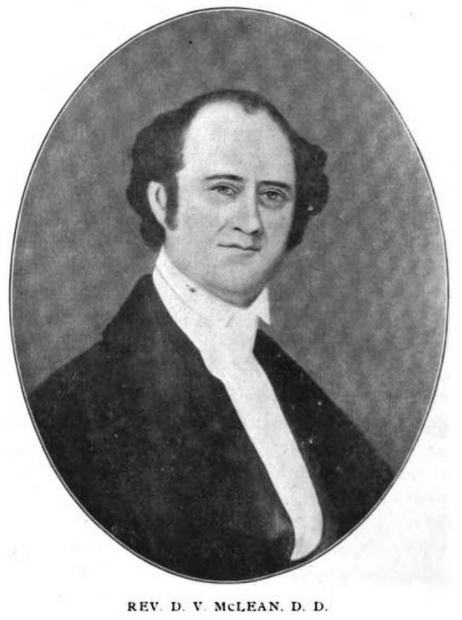
- An illustration of McLean
- Born: November 24, 1801; Fayette County, Pennsylvania, U.S.
- Died: November 23, 1869 (aged 67); Red Bank, New Jersey, U.S.
- Education: University of Ohio; Princeton Theological Seminary
- Occupation: Presbyterian minister
- Ordained: June 29, 1831
- Offices held: Lafayette College president 1850–1857

Daniel Veech McLean (November 24, 1801 – November 23, 1869) was a Presbyterian minister and the fifth president of Lafayette College.

== Early life and education ==
McLean was born November 24, 1901, in Fayette County, Pennsylvania. He spent most of his childhood in Ross County, Ohio. At 21, McLean became affiliated with the Presbyterian church in Athens, Ohio, and became interested in the seminary. In 1824, he graduated from the University of Ohio and for the next two years worked as a teacher in Chambersburg, Pennsylvania. After this, McLean attended the Princeton Theological Seminary for two years, and was ordained by the Presbytery of Miami on June 29, 1831.

== Career ==
McLean's first pastoral role was as a Stated Supply, which was an acting pastor, for a church in Lebanon, Ohio, though he soon moved to the Old Tennent Church in Manalapan, New Jersey, in 1832. He preached at the Old Tennent Church for four years before resigning in 1836. The year prior to his leaving, in 1835, McLean, along with members of the church board, agreed to form a new congregation in nearby Freehold, New Jersey, citing closer proximity to their own homes. On June 10 of that year, the church began construction, and by 1837, at the cost of $4,000, the church was completed. Many of the elders of the Old Tennent Church moved to the new church, then named The Village Church at Freehold, and on November 1, 1838, McLean was officially installed as the church's first pastor. He stayed with the church in Freehold for a period of twelve years before Lafayette College hired ed him in 1850 as the college's fifth president.

=== Lafayette College ===
McLean's entrance to Lafayette College came during a troubled financial time in the college's history. Previous presidents had left college with no endowment, and with debtors threatening to close to school. In 1848, the trustees of the college came within three votes of closing the school, and after the short presidency of Charles William Nassau provided no change in the endowment the college requested the Synod of Philadelphia of the Presbyterian Church for financial support. Aid from the Synod was agreed upon, but only if the college transferred over their control - which they agreed to do.

After the Synod took control of Lafayette College, they chose McLean to take over at the next president as he was known to have a talent for raising money (having done so previously with the Freehold church). Inaugurated in 1850, McLean's first order of business was to maintain long-term solvency for the college by offering tuition subscriptions at the price of $100 which could be traded in for a full college education on the stipulation the entire endowment goal was reached. By January, 1854, he succeeded in raising an endowment of $100,000 (equivalent to $14.6 million in 2024 dollars), which was immediately allocated to pay off the college's long list of debts and current expenses.

After fixing the college's economic crisis, McLean furthered the school's academic reputation greatly by hiring Francis March as an instructor. March, a graduate of Amherst College, had learned under the guidance of Noah Webster who was celebrated as the "Father of American Scholarship and Education". March's appointment to the school by McLean was seen as one of the pivotal moments in the history of higher education, as it was the first time a professor advocated the teaching of English in a college setting. Within a few years, starting with Lafayette, all American colleges began teaching English.

Within a year of hiring March, the school's subscription program had almost entirely paid off the college's debts. However, despite paying off their debts, the school was still operating at a loss of income, and McLean chose to resign at the end of the 1857 school year. The role of president was split among the trustees to the school, thus saving money that would otherwise be spent on a president's salary.

=== Further ministry ===
Following his presidency at Lafayette, McLean returned to the ministry and spent four years in London where he preached frequently. He returned to the United States in 1862 where he served for the next year as a pastor in Plainfield, New Jersey. After 1863, he moved to Red Bank, New Jersey, where he continued to preach until his death in 1869.

== Personal life ==
McLean married Evelina B. Linn on February 1, 1830, daughter of U.S. Congressman James Linn and granddaughter of New Jersey Governor William Livingston.

In addition to his other obligations, McLean served as a director at Princeton Theological Seminary from 1848 to 1860. Also in 1848, while a pastor of The Village Church in Freehold, New Jersey, McLean was awarded with the honorary title Doctor of Divinity from Lafayette College.

== Death ==
McLean died on November 23, 1869, in Red Bank, New Jersey, from Peptic ulcer disease. He was buried in the cemetery at Old Tennent Church in Manalapan, New Jersey.

Academic offices
Preceded by Charles William Nassau	President of Lafayette College; 1850–1857	Succeeded by George Wilson McPhail
