= Sidney A. McPhee =

Bahamian born, American educator

10th President of Middle Tennessee State University
- Incumbent
- Assumed office August 2001
- Preceded by: James E. Walker

Personal details
- Education: Prairie View A&M University (BA); University of Miami (MS); Oklahoma State University (EdD)
- Occupation: University president

Sidney A. McPhee is a Bahamian-born American educator currently serving as the President of Middle Tennessee State University (MTSU). His retirement from the position was announced on 17 March, 2026, effective in December of the same year.

== Early life ==
McPhee, who became MTSU's tenth president in 2001, earned his B.A. degree from Prairie View A&M University in 1976, a master's degree in 1979 from the University of Miami in Coral Gables, Florida, and a Doctorate in Applied Behavioral Studies in Education from Oklahoma State University.

== Presidency ==
=== Achievements ===
During McPhee's presidency, MTSU became the largest undergraduate university in Tennessee and the No. 1 producer of graduates in the Tennessee Board of Regents system. MTSU is also the top destination for transfer students in Tennessee, the state's veterans, and boasts the state's largest summer session enrollment.

McPhee's presidency also coincided with more than $400 million in improvements in academic, athletic and campus facilities – either proposed, under construction or competed – including the 257,000 square-foot, $147-million Science Building that opened in January 2015. McPhee has overseen the addition of almost 30 undergraduate and graduate degree programs, two colleges (Behavioral and Health Sciences and University College) and 12 institutes and centers. He was inducted into Omicron Delta Kappa as an honoris causa initiate in 2010.

His previous service includes a number of positions at the Tennessee Board of Regents: Executive Vice Chancellor; Chief Academic Officer; and—in the spring of 2000—Interim Chancellor. He has also served in the administration of the University of Louisville and the University of Memphis.

McPhee has also worked to strengthen MTSU's international undergraduate and graduate student enrollment, expanded its study-abroad and cultural opportunities and developed research collaboration with international partners. A book of his photographic essays, China: Through the Eyes of A University President, published in July 2012, was sponsored by the Hanban-Confucius Institute and released internationally.

McPhee served a four-year term on the NCAA Division I Board of Directors from 2003 to 2007 and a three-year term on the NCAA Executive Committee. He was appointed to the NCAA Presidential Commission on the Future of Intercollegiate Athletics in May 2005. In 2010, he was re-appointed to the NCAA board and its executive committee as the Sun Belt Conference's representative, which concluded in 2013 when MTSU joined Conference USA. He served two terms as president of the Sun Belt and was chairman of its CEO Executive Committee. McPhee co-chaired the Tennessee Legislative Retreat Task Force on Higher Education and was recently reelected to a second three-year term as a commission member of the Southern Association of Colleges and Schools.

=== Recognition ===
In 2011, the university regained elevated status as a Comprehensive/Doctoral institution by the Carnegie Corporation, one of the nation's oldest and most influential foundations. Also, in 2011 and 2012, Carnegie recognized the university for its community service and engagement.

McPhee was named Outstanding American University President of 2002 by the American Football Foundation. In 2003, he was listed by Nashville Post business magazine as one of Tennessee's 100 Most Powerful Individuals and, in 2004, he was ranked by Business Tennessee magazine as one of the state's Top 50 Most Powerful African Americans. ' The Nashville Business Journal honored McPhee in 2013 with its Rutherford County Impact Award.

China Agricultural University in Beijing awarded McPhee its highest academic award (Honorary Professor) in May 2007. He was appointed in October 2010 as senior advisor to the Chief Executive of Hanban-Confucius Institute Headquarters in Beijing.

=== Sexual harassment scandal ===
McPhee was the subject of a sexual harassment lawsuit in 2003 filed by an employee, which was heard by Tennessee Supreme Court on June 6, 2007. Among other improprieties, McPhee was alleged to have rubbed his pelvic area against the body of the employee as well as making lewd references to his "seven wood". He was reported to have attempted suicide when the allegations became public. The court found that McPhee had violated the Tennessee Board of Regents' sexual harassment policy and he was given a 20-day suspension, had his salary reduced by $10,000 for one year and was required to attend an employment-issues sexual harassment class.
