= John Rood Cunningham =

12th President of Davidson College
- In office 1941–1957
- Preceded by: Walter Lee Lingle
- Succeeded by: David Grier Martin

Personal details
- Born: John Rood Cunningham; July 3, 1891 Williamsburg, Missouri
- Died: June 15, 1980 (aged 88) Charlotte, North Carolina
- Education: Westminster College; Louisville Presbyterian Theological Seminary
- Profession: Professor college president

John Rood Cunningham (July 3, 1891 – June 15, 1980) was the 12th president of Davidson College. Born in Missouri, Cunningham came to Davidson after spending several years in the ministry, including serving as president of Louisville Presbyterian Theological Seminary.

As president, Cunningham was able to expand the endowment to five million dollars, almost double the size of the faculty, and increase the student population from around 160 students to 970 students. Cunningham also spearheaded the construction of several new buildings in order to accommodate the growth in students and faculty.

After leaving Davidson, Cunningham was appointed the executive director of the Southern Presbyterian Foundation.

Academic offices
Preceded by Walter Lee Lingle	President of Davidson College; 1941–1957	Succeeded by David Grier Martin
