= Drury Lacy Jr. =

Third president of Davidson College

3rd President of Davidson College
- In office 1855–1860
- Preceded by: Samuel Williamson (academic)
- Succeeded by: John Lycan Kirkpatrick

Personal details
- Born: August 5, 1802 Ararat, Virginia
- Died: August 1, 1884 (aged 81) Raleigh, North Carolina
- Education: Washington College; Hampden-Sydney College; Union Theological Seminary
- Profession: Pastor

Drury Lacy Jr. (August 5, 1802 – August 1, 1884) was the third president of Davidson College. A native of Virginia, he was ordained as a Presbyterian minister in Powhatan County in early 1833. He served churches in New Bern, North Carolina, and then in Raleigh, North Carolina before becoming president of Davidson.

As president, Davidson received a large financial commitment from a Maxwell Chambers, making Davidson the wealthiest private college in the entire South. Lacy left Davidson in 1860 and eventually became a chaplain in the Confederate States Army. In 1863, he was appointed by the Executive Committee of Domestic Missions to serve as missionary commissioner to the Confederate soldiers in eastern North Carolina and southeastern Virginia. After the war, he returned to the ministry until his death.

== Personal life ==
Drury Lacy died on Aug. 1, 1884, in Jonesboro, NC, at the home of his son, William S. Lacy, who was pastoring a church there. His wife, Mary Rice, eldest daughter of Benjamin H. Rice, died in 1880. They had had another son, William, who died as a two-year-old child on Nov. 21, 1832.

Academic offices
| Preceded by Samuel Williamson (academic) | President of Davidson College; 1855–1860 | Succeeded by John Lycan Kirkpatrick |
