= David Carlisle Humphreys =

American engineer (1855–1921)

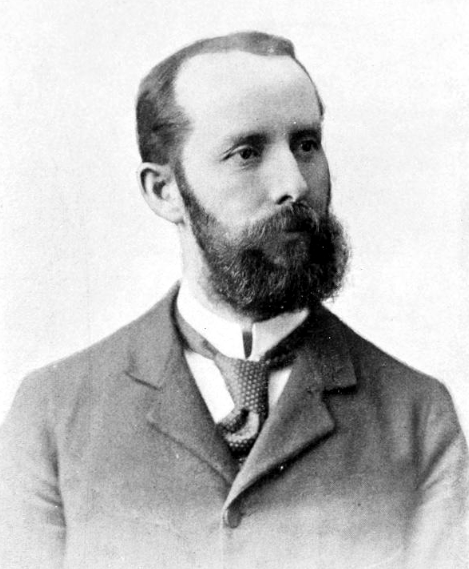
- Born: October 14, 1855; Smyth County, Virginia
- Died: January 10, 1921 (aged 65); Roanoke, Virginia
- Education: Washington and Lee University
- Occupation(s): Engineer, cartographer, educator
- Spouse: Mary Lammee Sloan (m. 1888; died 1912)

David Carlisle Humphreys (October 14, 1855 – January 10, 1921) was an engineer, architect, cartographer, hydrographer, inventor, educator and co-founder of Omicron Delta Kappa, a national leadership honor society, with chapters at more than three hundred college campuses. He was also a member of Phi Gamma Delta in the Class of 1878.

== Biography ==
David Carlisle Humphreys was born in Smyth County, Virginia on October 14, 1855. He attended private schools, was tutored by his father, and worked as an assistant to Jedediah Hotchkiss. He entered Washington and Lee University in Lexington, Virginia in 1875, and earned two honorary scholarships.

He married Mary Lammee Sloan on September 4, 1888. She died in 1912.

He was elected to the American Society of Civil Engineers in 1887, to the Society for the Promotion of Engineering Education in 1893, and to the National Geographic Society in 1899.

Humphreys served as Dean of the School of Applied Science at Washington and Lee University from 1904 to 1912, and Dean of the School of Engineering from 1912 until his death. He died from cancer at his son's home in Roanoke, Virginia on January 10, 1921.
