= Carol Quillen =

American professor and academic administrator

18th President of Davidson College
- In office 2011–2022
- Preceded by: Thomas W. Ross
- Succeeded by: Douglas A. Hicks

Personal details
- Spouses: Terry Lohrenz; Ken Kennedy; George McLendon
- Children: Caitlin
- Education: University of Chicago; Princeton University
- Profession: Professor; Academic administrator

Carol Everhart Quillen is an American professor and academic administrator. She was the 18th president of Davidson College and currently serves on the Princeton Board of Trustees. She was the first female president of Davidson College and its and first non-alumnus president since 1958. Quillen was president of the National Trust for Historic Preservation from January 2024 until June 2026.

== Biography ==
Quillen grew up in New Castle, Delaware. Her father, William Quillen, was a judge on the Delaware Supreme Court. Her mother, Marcia, was director of development at Wilmington Friends School. Quillen attended the University of Chicago, where she was a student of Allan Bloom. After finishing her PhD at Princeton University, Quillen became a professor of history at Rice University in 1990. At Rice, Quillen eventually became a vice president, focusing on international studies.

In 2011, Quillen became president of Davidson College, becoming the college's first female president. She oversaw major initiatives and changes, including major construction projects such as adding a new practice facility at the Baker Sports Complex and a new science center. She also aided in the transition from the Southern Conference to the Atlantic 10 Conference. During her tenure, Davidson received totaling $45 million from The Duke Endowment, the largest donation in the school's history. Quillen has also overseen the college's $425-million capital campaign. Quillen has advocated accountability for the victims of campus sexual assault and called for increased due process for victims. Quillen resigned from Davidson in 2022, calling her time at the college as an "extraordinary gift".

In 2014, she was appointed to the Advisory Council on Financial Capability for Young Americans by President Barack Obama. Since 2016, Quillen has served as a trustee of the National Humanities Center in Research Triangle Park.

In 2024, Quillen became president of the National Trust for Historic Preservation. She resigned in June 2026, citing family reasons.

Academic offices
Preceded by Thomas W. Ross	President of Davidson College; 2011–2022	Succeeded by Douglas A. Hicks
