= Phi Beta Kappa =

Honor society for the liberal arts and sciences in the United States

- ΦΒΚ
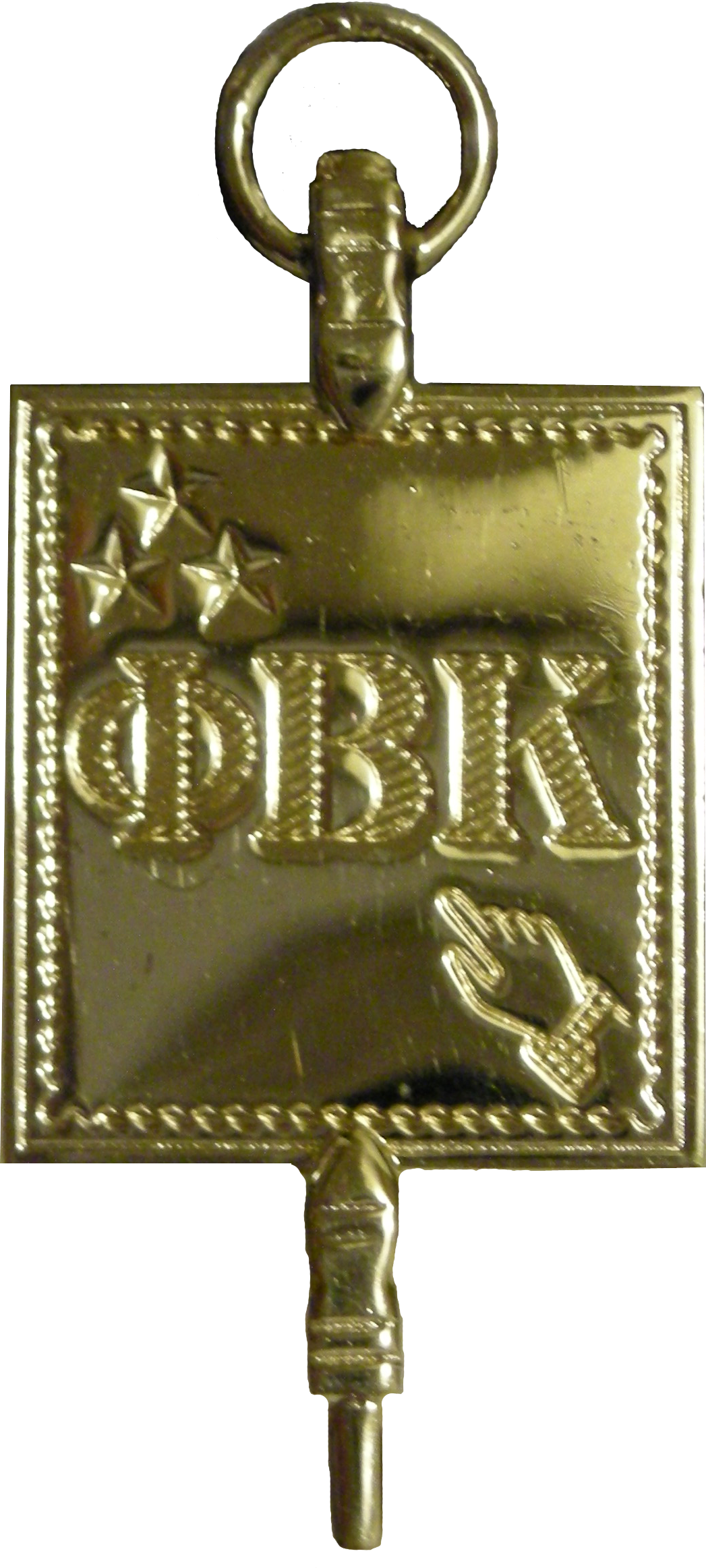
- Founded: December 5, 1776; 249 years ago College of William & Mary
- Type: Honor
- Affiliation: HSC
- Former affiliation: ACHS
- Status: Active
- Emphasis: Liberal arts and sciences
- Scope: National (United States)
- Motto: Φιλοσοφία βίου κυβερνήτης Philosophíā bíou kybernḗtēs "Love of learning is the guide to life"
- Colors: Pink and Sky blue
- Publication: The American Scholar
- Chapters: 293
- Members: 500,000+ lifetime
- Headquarters: 1606 New Hampshire Avenue NW; Washington, DC 20009; United States
- Website: pbk.org

The Phi Beta Kappa Society (ΦΒΚ) is the oldest academic honor society in the United States. Founded in 1776 at the College of William & Mary in Virginia, Phi Beta Kappa aims to promote and advocate excellence in the liberal arts and sciences, and to induct outstanding students of arts and sciences at select American colleges and universities. Since its inception, its inducted members include 17 United States presidents, 42 United States Supreme Court justices, and 136 Nobel laureates.

== History ==
=== Origins ===
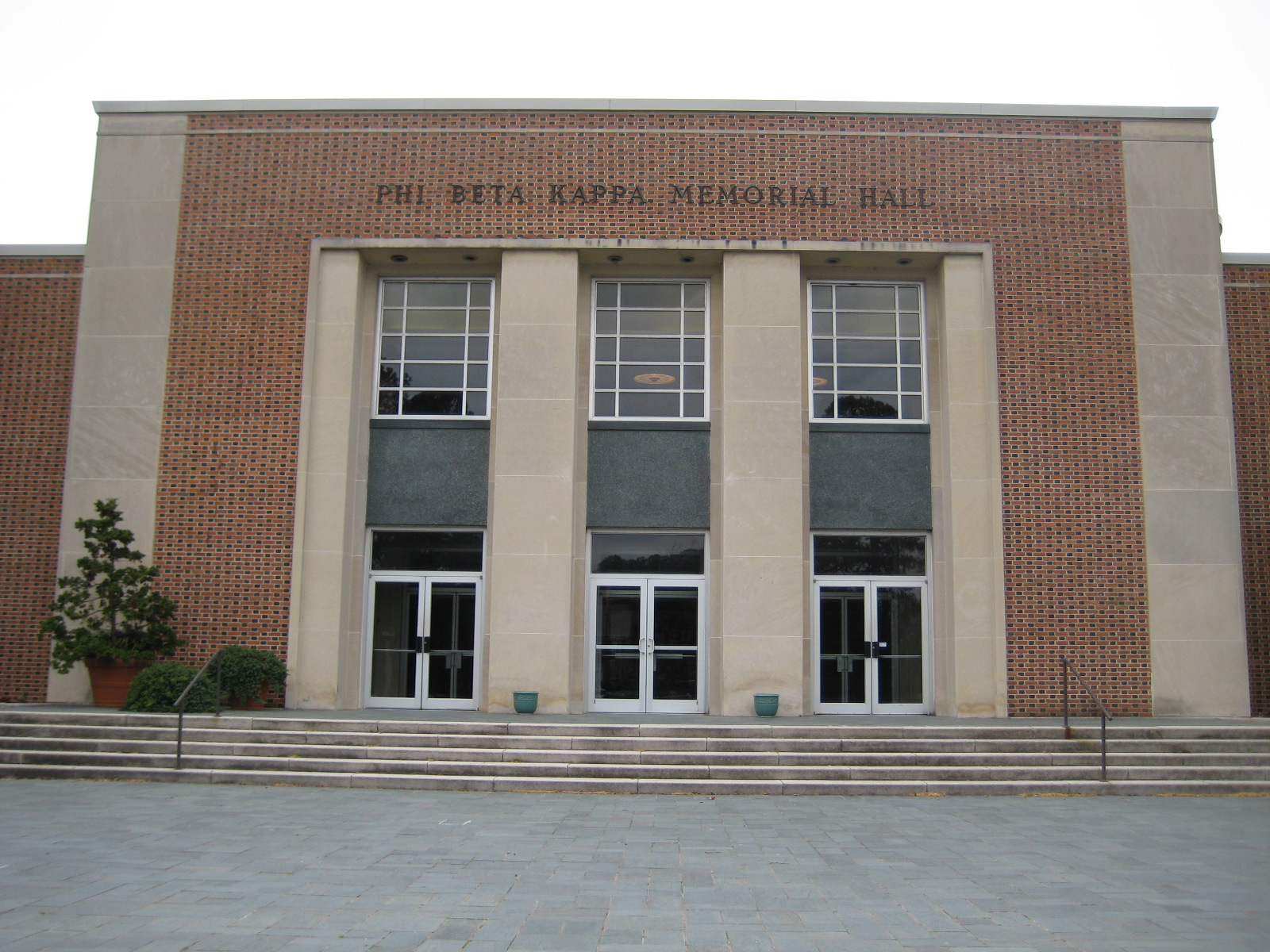
Phi Beta Kappa Memorial Hall entrance at the College of William & Mary

The Phi Beta Kappa Society had its first meeting on December 5, 1776, at the College of William & Mary in Williamsburg, Virginia, by five students, with John Heath as its first President. The society established the precedent for naming American college societies after the initial letters of a secret Greek motto. The group consisted of students who frequented the Raleigh Tavern as a common meeting area off the college campus. A persistent story maintains that a Masonic lodge also met at this tavern, but the Freemasons gathered at a different building in Williamsburg. (Some of the original members of Phi Beta Kappa did become Freemasons, but later in life).

Whether the students organized to meet more freely and discuss non-academic topics, or to discuss politics in a Revolutionary society is unknown. The earliest records indicate only that the students met to debate and engage in oratory, and on topics that would have been not far removed from the curriculum. In the Phi Beta Kappa Initiation of 1779, the new member was informed,

here then you may for a while disengage yourself from scholastic cares and communicate without reserve whatever reflections you have made upon various objects; remembering that everything transacted within this room is transacted sub rosa, ... here, too, you are to indulge in matters of speculation that freedom of inquiry which ever dispels the clouds of falsehood by the radiant sunshine of truth.

=== Latin letter fraternal societies ===
Older fraternal societies existed at College of William & Mary. The F.H.C. Society (nicknamed "the Flat Hat Club"), founded in 1750, is the first collegiate secret society recorded in North America; unlike the newer Phi Beta Kappa, the F.H.C. was a Latin-letter society, its name taken from the initial letters of a Latin motto (perhaps Fraternitas, Humanitas, Cognitioque).

A second Latin-letter fraternity at William & Mary, the P.D.A. Society, was publicly known as "Please Don't Ask". John Heath, chief organizer of the Phi Beta Kappa, according to tradition earlier sought but was refused admission to the P.D.A., though he may instead have disdained to join it (much later, his friend and fellow student William Short wrote that the P.D.A. "had lost all reputation for letters, and was noted only for the dissipation & conviviality of its members").

=== Secret fraternal society ===
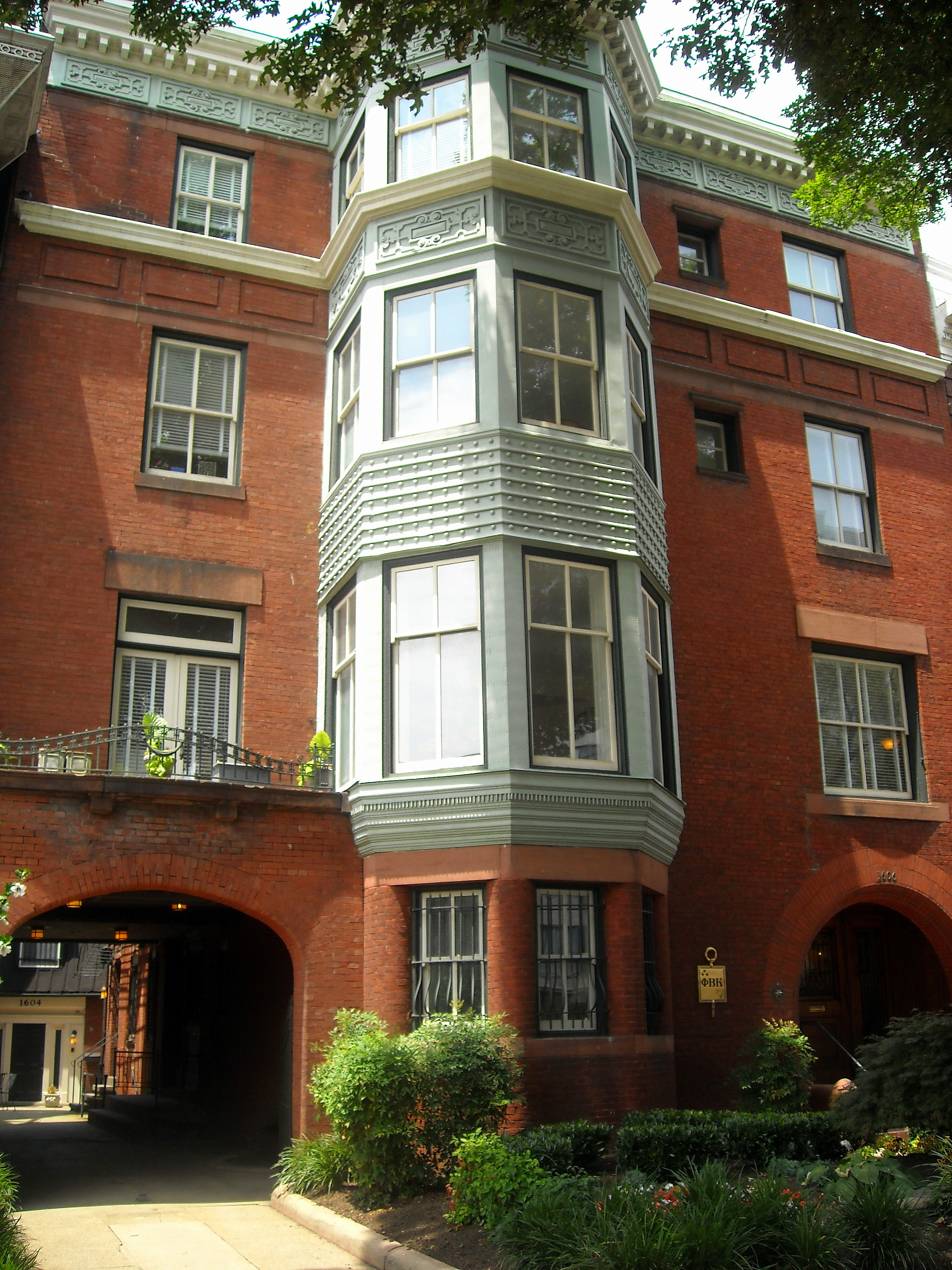
Phi Beta Kappa national headquarters

The new society was intended to be "purely of domestic manufacture, without any connection whatever with anything European, either English or German." The founders of Phi Beta Kappa declared that the society was formed for congeniality and to promote good fellowship, with "friendship as its basis and benevolence and literature as its pillars." Before the British attempt at reclamation of the sovereign American colonies, including Virginia, there was a temporary closure of the College of William & Mary and disbandment of Phi Beta Kappa in early 1781. Elisha Parmelee, an alumnus of Yale College and Harvard College, passed through Williamsburg and took charters from the Phi Beta Kappa to establish branches of the society at these schools. A second chapter was founded at Yale College in late 1780; a third, at Harvard College in 1781; and a fourth, at Dartmouth College in 1787.

Phi Beta Kappa was a secret society to protect its members and to instill a sense of solidarity. The new society was given the motto Φιλοσοφία βίου κυβερνήτης (Philosophíā bíou kybernḗtēs), which means "The love of wisdom is the guide to life". Greek was chosen because it was the language of science in Roman times. Later, in May 1777, a new sign of recognition was devised: "A salutation of the clasp of the hands, together with an immediate stroke across the mouth with the back of the same hand, and a return with the hand used by the saluted". This new complex of gestures was created to allow the mutual recognition of members "in any foreign country or place."

=== Transition to academic honor society ===
Further chapters appeared at Union College in 1817, Bowdoin College in 1825, and Brown University in 1830. The original chapter at William & Mary was re-established. In 1831, the Harvard chapter publicly disclosed the fraternity's secrets during a period of strong anti-Masonic sentiment. The first chapter established after Phi Beta Kappa became an "open" society was that at Trinity College in Connecticut, in 1845. University of Alabama established in 1851. In the pre-Civil War period, Society chapters frequently sponsored addresses by distinguished speakers. Ralph Waldo Emerson's 1837 address at Harvard, "The American Scholar", is the best-known of those addresses, but there were dozens of others at schools such as Bowdoin, Brown, Dartmouth, Harvard, Union, and Yale.

As the first collegiate organization of its type to adopt a Greek-letter name, the Phi Beta Kappa is generally considered a forerunner of modern college fraternities as well as the model for later collegiate honorary societies. Ironically, it was partly the rise of true "social" fraternities modeled after Phi Beta Kappa later in the nineteenth century which obviated the social aspects of membership in the organization, transforming it into the honorary society it is today. By 1883, when the United Chapters of Phi Beta Kappa were established, there were 25 chapters. The first women were elected to the Society at the University of Vermont in 1875, and the first African-American member, George Washington Henderson, was elected at the same institution two years later. In 1885, however, Phi Beta Kappa eliminated those majoring in engineering from eligibility. This practice continues today.

Each chapter is designated by its state and a Greek letter indicating its position in the order in which that state's chapters were founded. For example, Alpha of Pennsylvania refers to the chapter at Dickinson College, founded in 1887; Beta of Pennsylvania, the chapter at Lehigh University (founded later that same year); Gamma of Pennsylvania, the chapter at Lafayette College (1890); and Delta of Pennsylvania, the chapter at the University of Pennsylvania (1892). By 1920, a total of 89 chapters existed at a variety of schools. Phi Beta Kappa was one of six honor societies that co-founded the ACHS on December 30, 1925. Its participation was short-lived, with the decision to withdraw and operate again as an independent society made just over a decade later, effective December 15, 1937.

=== Post-war era ===
In the 1960s, Vanderbilt University professor Donald Davidson claimed that Phi Beta Kappa was under the influence of Communists. In 1988, the United Chapters of Phi Beta Kappa officially changed its name to The Phi Beta Kappa Society, recalling the name under which the organization had been established in 1776.

In 1996, The New York Times reported declining rates of Phi Beta Kappa membership acceptance at state universities. Phi Beta Kappa officers have attributed this to the increasing numbers of "first-generation college students, students who do not consult their parents on such matters, and students who have gone to public schools, all of whom are less likely to have heard of the society". Earlier, in 1970, Robert Reinhold had reported that recipient students at the University of California at Berkeley expressed a mix of distaste and shame about the honor. Other members expressed a lack of satisfaction with the society for its significance.

A 1997 article from The Journal of Blacks in Higher Education criticized the society for under-representation at historically black colleges and universities. The authors wrote that "Only 3 of the nation's 100 black colleges and universities are members of Phi Beta Kappa" due to a rule that 10 faculty members at a university must be existing members, for which Black faculty would be socially disadvantaged due to a historic lack of admittance into relevant universities. Additionally, they created a list of "Predominantly White But Second- or Third-Tier Colleges and Universities That Have Been Awarded Phi Beta Kappa Chapters," which included Allegheny College and Millsaps College.

In 2008, the Phi Beta Kappa Society was awarded the Arts and Sciences Advocacy Award from the Council of Colleges of Arts and Sciences (CCAS). CCAS bestows this award upon an individual or organization demonstrating exemplary advocacy for the arts and sciences, flowing from a deep commitment to the intrinsic worth of liberal arts education.

Phi Beta Kappa participates in a more loosely coordinated lobbying association of four of the nation's oldest and most prestigious honor societies, called the Honor Society Caucus. Its members include Phi Beta Kappa, Phi Kappa Phi, Sigma Xi, and Omicron Delta Kappa.

== Symbols ==
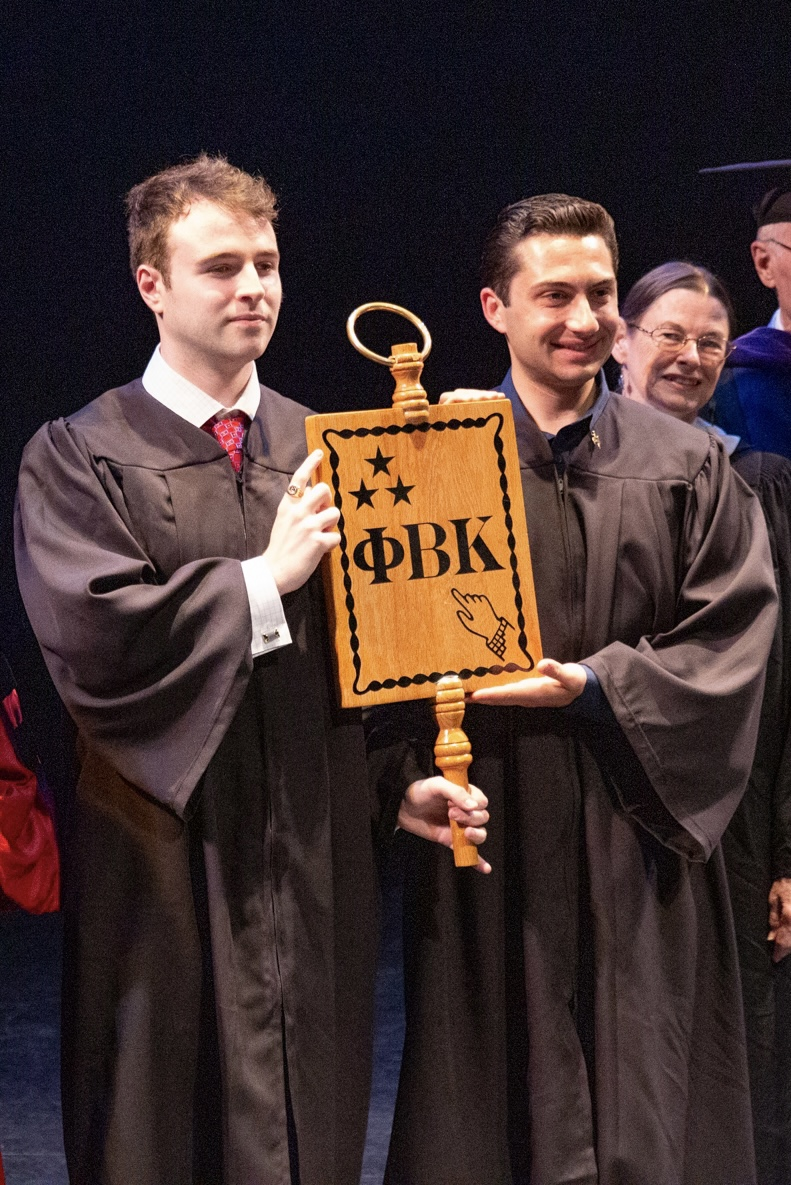
Students hold the Key of Phi Beta Kappa at Duke University.

The Greek letters phi (Φ), beta (Β), and kappa (Κ) stand for Φιλοσοφία βίου κυβερνήτης (Philosophíā bíou kybernḗtēs), which means "Wisdom-loving [is] guide of life"—i.e., "The love of wisdom is the guide to life" (or, less literally as the society prefers to translate it, "Love of learning is the guide to life").

The symbol of the Phi Beta Kappa Society is a golden key engraved on the obverse with the image of a pointing finger, three stars, and the Greek letters from which the society takes its name. On the reverse are found the initials "SP" in the script. One official historian of the society, William T. Hastings, and some others believe that the "S" and "P", which stood for Societas Philosophiae, "Philosophical Society", were the original name of the Society and that "Phi Beta Kappa" came only over time to be taken as the name of the society. The heading on the original list of members states, "A List of the members, who have been initiated into the S.P. alias Phi Beta Kappa Society."

The "key" of Phi Beta Kappa did not begin as a copy of a watch key. The first insignia was a larger, cut-and-engraved silver medallion, essentially a square of metal with a loop cut integrally with the body of the square from the same sheet of silver, to allow for suspension from one or two ribbons worn around the member's neck in the manner in which the older fraternities (and the Masonic bodies on which the collegiate societies were in part patterned) wore their insignia. Later, the size of the medallion was reduced and men took to wearing the insignia on their watch chains as fobs.

Though several stylistic details have survived since the earliest days—the use of the stars, pointing hand, and Greek letters on the obverse, for example—notable differences exist between older keys and current examples. The name of the recipient was not engraved on the earliest fobs or keys and was not until the first decade of the nineteenth century. The name of the school from which the fob or key came was also not routinely included on the earliest models, and sometimes the only way to trace a key to a particular school's chapter is by researching the name of the recipient against surviving class records.

The number of stars on the obverse has also changed over the years, with never fewer than three, but on some known examples with as many as a dozen (the explanation as to the meaning of the stars in these early cases varies from chapter to chapter). Also, the date of the awarding of the honor is only seen on keys from the second quarter of the nineteenth century onward (some people mistake the date that appears on the fob or key—December 5, 1776—as the date that a particular fob or key was awarded, when in fact it is merely the date of the founding of the society). Only in 1912 was the key made to a uniform standard of size, golden appearance (some are plated), and engraving with the school's name, recipient's name, and date of the award.

== Activities ==
=== Publications ===
The Phi Beta Kappa Society publishes The Key Reporter, a newsletter distributed quarterly to all contributing members and biannually to all other members, and The American Scholar, a quarterly subscription-based journal that accepts essays on literature, history, science, public affairs, and culture.

=== Awards and fellowships ===
The Phi Beta Kappa Book Awards are the Ralph Waldo Emerson Award, the Christian Gauss Award, and the Phi Beta Kappa Award in Science. The Book Awards are given annually to outstanding scholarly books published in the United States. Winning works, which are drawn from the fields of the humanities, the social sciences, the natural sciences, and mathematics, must be of broad interest and accessible to the general reader. Each award carries a $10,000 prize. The winners were selected from five short-listed titles in each category.

The Dr. Martin R. Lebowitz and Eve Lewellis Lebowitz Prize for Philosophical Achievement and Contribution is awarded by the Phi Beta Kappa Society in conjunction with the American Philosophical Association. The associated Lebowitz Symposium is presented annually at a divisional meeting of the American Philosophical Association. The prize was established in 2013 by Eve Lewellis Lebowitz in honor of her late husband, Martin R. Lebowitz, to provide significant, tangible recognition for excellence in philosophical thought. The Symposium program consists of a pair of lectures to be delivered at an annual APA division meeting and a Phi Beta Kappa event. The topic of the lectures should be an important philosophical issue of current interest, and the lectures should offer contrasting (not necessarily opposing) views on that topic. Honoraria for the symposiasts are funded at an adjusted rate based on the current size of the endowment. Previous winners have won as much as $25,000 each.

The Mary Isabel Sibley Fellowship is awarded annually, alternating in the fields of Greek and French. The award may be used for the study of Greek language, literature, history, or archaeology, or the study of French language or literature. Established in 1934 by Isabelle Stone (ΦΒΚ, Wellesley College) in honor of her mother, Mary Isabel Sibley, the fellowship was designed to reward the women in these two fields of study with the experience of studying and living abroad, which Miss Stone did in Greece during her studies. The fellowship carries a stipend of $20,000.

The Walter J. Jensen Fellowship for French Language, Literature, and Culture aims to help educators and researchers improve education in standard French language, literature, and culture and in the study of standard French in the United States. Established in 2001 by Professor Walter J. Jensen (ΦΒΚ, UCLA), the fellowship is awarded for at least six continuous months of study in France and carries a stipend originally set in 1995 at $10,000, to be adjusted for inflation. The stipend for 2016 was $15,500. The Romanell-Phi Beta Kappa Professorship is awarded annually to scholars in the field of philosophy, without restriction to any one school of philosophical thought. The professorship recognizes not only distinguished achievement but also the recipient's contribution or potential contribution to public understanding of philosophy.

=== Programs ===
Since 1956, the Phi Beta Kappa Visiting Scholar Program has offered undergraduates the opportunity to spend time with some of America's most distinguished scholars. The purpose of the program is to contribute to the intellectual life of the campus by making possible an exchange of ideas between the Visiting Scholars and the resident faculty and students. Phi Beta Kappa also sponsors a National Arts & Sciences Initiative, which taps into its cross-country network of members, chapters, and associations to connect with leaders, shares the value of the arts and sciences through all of life, and advocate for policies that strengthen an arts and sciences education.

== Membership ==
Phi Beta Kappa has chapters in only about 10% of American higher learning institutions, and only about 10% of these schools' Arts and Sciences graduates are invited to join. Although most students are elected in their senior year, many colleges elect a limited number of extremely select students in their junior year, generally less than 2% of the class. Some chapters also elect graduate students graduating with Master's or Doctoral degrees who have exceptional academic records. Each chapter sets its academic standards, but all inductees must have studied the liberal arts and sciences, demonstrated "good moral character", and, usually, earned grades placing them in the top tenth of their class. However, at least one school, Princeton University, includes Bachelor of Science in Engineering (BSE) students in Phi Beta Kappa. There is a mandatory initiation fee (between $50 and $95, as of 2005), which is sometimes covered by the inductee's university. Membership in Phi Beta Kappa is typically limited to students with very high grade point averages (GPAs), typically 3.9 out of a 4.0 scale. In 2001, a quorum of PBK alumni voted to raise the GPA cutoff: though all chapters set their standards for induction, they were now instructed to be much more selective in terms of GPA.

== Chapters ==
Phi Beta Kappa has 293 chapters. Chapters are approved at the Triennial Conventions.

== Notable members ==
Since its inception, 17 U.S. Presidents, 42 U.S. Supreme Court Justices, and more than 136 Nobel Laureates have been inducted members.

== See also ==
- College literary societies
- Phi Beta Kappa Award in Science
- Phi Kappa Phi
