= Thomas Warren Ross =

American lawyer

Thomas W. Ross

President of the University of North Carolina
- In office January 1, 2011 – January 4, 2016
- Preceded by: Erskine Bowles
- Succeeded by: Margaret Spellings

17th President of Davidson College
- In office 2007–2010
- Preceded by: Robert F. Vagt
- Succeeded by: Carol Quillen

Personal details
- Born: June 5, 1950 (age 76) Greensboro, North Carolina, U.S.
- Party: Democratic
- Education: Davidson College; University of North Carolina, Chapel Hill

Thomas Warren Ross Sr. is an American public official who served as the president of the University of North Carolina system from 2011 to 2016. He succeeded Erskine Bowles on January 1, 2011. Formerly, he was president of Davidson College, a private North Carolina liberal arts college from August 1, 2007, to January 1, 2011, and received membership in Omicron Delta Kappa while there in 2008.

== Career ==
Ross, a native of Greensboro, North Carolina, graduated from Davidson in 1972, as did his father in 1937 and his children in 1999 and 2001. In 1975, he graduated with honors from the University of North Carolina School of Law. Ross became an attorney, chief of staff to Congressman Robin Britt, a state superior court judge for 17 years, director of the North Carolina Administrative Office of the Courts, and executive director of the Z. Smith Reynolds Foundation in Winston-Salem (2001–2007). He is a former chairman of the UNC Greensboro Board of Trustees.

Ross is the recipient of the William Rehnquist Award for Judicial Excellence, the Boy Scouts of America Distinguished Eagle Scout Award, Governing Magazine's National Public Official of the Year award (one of ten, 1994), and the Order of the Long Leaf Pine.

Ross is known for his controversial sentence of a non-violent offender to 160 years in prison. In 1989, he sentenced Derek Twyman (a Canadian citizen living in North Carolina) to 160 years in prison for non-violent property crimes. In 2016, 27 years later, he was surprised to hear that Twyman was still in prison. The following year, Ross helped obtain parole for Twyman who was able to return to Canada that summer.

On August 26, 2010, Ross was elected president of the University of North Carolina system.

On June 6, 2015, Ross delivered the commencement address at the North Carolina School of Science and Mathematics, a UNC member institution.

Ross was fired as president by the University of North Carolina Board of Governors; he publicly stated that his departure was not voluntary. His last day at the University of North Carolina was January 3, 2016.

In an article on the Washington Post on May 18, 2016, as of July 1, 2016, Ross will become the president of the Volcker Alliance, a nonpartisan organization aimed at rebuilding public trust in government that was founded by Paul Volcker.

Ross was named the first Terry Sanford Distinguished Fellow at Duke University's Sanford School of Public Policy in 2016.
