= Omicron Delta Kappa =

American honor society

- ΟΔΚ
- Founded: December 3, 1914; 111 years ago Washington and Lee University
- Type: Honor
- Affiliation: HSC
- Former affiliation: ACHS
- Status: Active
- Emphasis: Leadership and scholarship
- Scope: National
- Motto: "The Laurel Crowned Circle"
- Pillars: Scholarship, Service, Integrity, Character, Fellowship
- Member badge
- Colors: White, Black, and Light Blue
- Flower: Blue delphinium
- Publication: The Circle
- Chapters: 287 active
- Members: 350,000+ lifetime
- Headquarters: 224 McLaughlin Street; Lexington, Virginia 24450; United States
- Website: odk.org

Omicron Delta Kappa (ΟΔΚ), also known as The Circle and ODK, is an American collegiate honor society that recognizes leadership and scholarship. It was founded in 1914, at Washington and Lee University in Lexington, Virginia and has chartered more than 400 chapters or circles. To be selected as a member of ΟΔΚ, students must be among the top 35 percent of all students at that particular institution and hold a leadership role in one of the society's five areas of recognition. Omicron Delta Kappa is a member of the Honor Society Caucus, along with Phi Beta Kappa, Phi Kappa Phi, and Sigma Xi.

== History ==
=== Founding ===
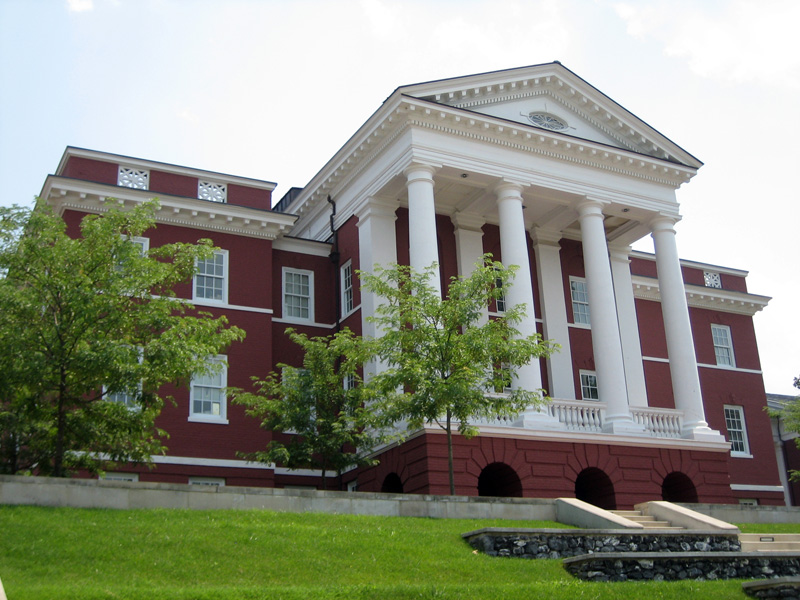
Reid Hall, Washington and Lee

On December 3, 1914, the Omicron Delta Kappa Society was founded by fifteen men who met in an office on the third floor of Reid Hall at Washington and Lee University. J. Carl Fisher first introduced the idea of creating such a society to a close friend, Rupert Latture. The two soon included mutual friend William Brown in the discussion; these three are referred to as the principal founders of the society.

Together with the president of the university, the dean of engineering, and another faculty member, Fisher, Latture, and Brown selected nine others to join them. Omicron Delta Kappa's fifteen charter members were:

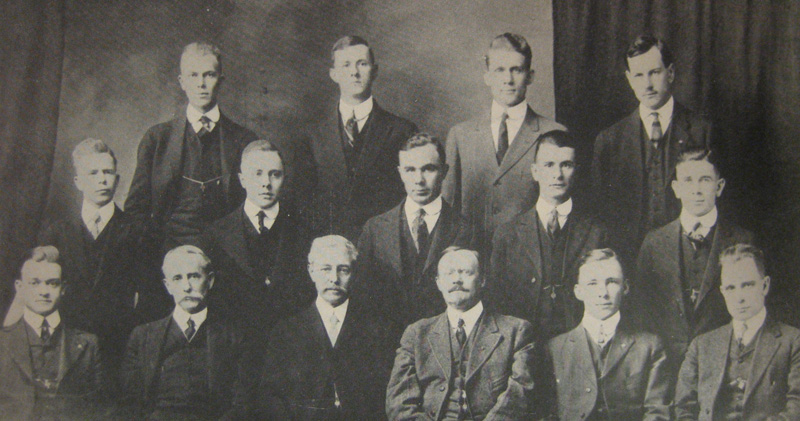
The founders of the Omicron Delta Kappa Society

- James Edwin Bear, ΒΘΠ, editor of the student magazine
- William Moseley Brown, ΔΚΕ, ΦΒΚ, debater and president of the campus YMCA
- Carl Shaffer Davidson, ΚΣ, student instructor in civil engineering
- Edward Parks Davis, ΚΣ, athlete
- Edward A. Donahue, ΦΚΣ, captain of football and baseball teams
- De la Warr Benjamin Easter, PhD, ΚΣ, ΦΒΚ, professor and the founding president of ΟΔΚ
- James Carl Fisher, business manager of the student magazine and founder of the campus radio station
- Philip Pendleton Gibson, ΠΚΑ, president of student government and editor of the Ring-Tum Phi newspaper
- Thomas McPheeters Glasgow, ΦΔΘ, orator and athlete
- David Carlisle Humphreys, ΦΓΔ(Fiji), professor and dean of the School of Applied Science
- Rupert Nelson Latture, ΔΥ, ΦΒΚ, a president of the campus YMCA
- John Eppes Martin, ΑΧΡ, business manager of the yearbook
- William Caulfield Raftery, ΦΚΣ, athlete
- John Purver Richardson Jr., ΣΧ, instructor in biology
- Henry Louis Smith, PhD, ΦΔΘ, ΦΒΚ, president of Washington and Lee University

All fifteen men were prominent leaders on campus. They rallied around the idea that all-around leadership in college should be recognized, in all phases of college life.

The founders kept the organization secret until keys could be designed and produced. The keys arrived shortly past the winter holiday. The student newspaper, Ring-Tum Phi, broke the news on January 12, 1915, of a new society to be known as "The Circle," with the secret significance of its three Greek letters known only to its members. The members first wore their keys on January 15, 1915.

The society's first class of members were initiated at Washington and Lee in May 1915. In 1916, Omicron Delta Kappa became a national society with the establishment of Beta at Johns Hopkins University and Gamma at the University of Pennsylvania. It held its first national convention in 1920 at Johns Hopkins. By 1927, it has 17 circles or chapters with 1,500 members. It had grown to 106 circles and 38,660 initiates in 1963.

=== Women in ODK ===
Only men could become members of Omicron Delta Kappa in the first sixty years of its existence. At the 1970 and 1972 national conventions, the University of Alabama Circle introduced an amendment to the national constitution to admit women into the society. In June 1972, Title IX prohibited sex discrimination in federally assisted educational programs and amended parts of the Civil Rights Act of 1964. Professional and honor fraternities were included in Title IX. Omicron Delta Kappa's special committee on the possible role of women met in January 1973 and recommended changes to the national constitution that would abolish segregation based on gender. On March 12, 1974, the national convention convened in New Orleans and approved the initiation of women into the society. The first women members were initiated that day, including Carolyn Julia Kucinski, and Diane Christine Ragosa of the Newark College of Engineering circle and Robbie Lynn Cooney, Maria Dolores Delvalle, Roxane R. Dow, Catherine Ann Rohrbacher, Karen Diane Janzer, Linda Ann Touten, Martha Gwyn Van Deman, and Cathy Sue Welch of the University of South Florida circle.

Cheryl Hogle was elected as the first woman national president at the national convention in Knoxville, Tennessee on February 25, 1998.

=== Affiliations and memberships ===
A similar honorary society, for exceptionally outstanding women leaders, known as Mortar Board, was established in 1918, with many similar ideals and purposes of Omicron Delta Kappa. With the passage of Title IX, each of those two societies was then required to accept candidates of either gender into its membership. As a result, the two organizations found themselves competing to tap many of the same distinguished students, and those formerly complementary societies became rivals at many institutions.

On March 22, 1992, the national convention passed a resolution authorizing the incorporation of the society. On July 1, 1992, the Omicron Delta Kappa Society was merged into the corporation the Omicron Delta Kappa Society, Inc.

Omicron Delta Kappa became a member of the Association of College Honor Societies on March 30, 1930. It resigned that membership in 2005. Today, the society participates in a more loosely coordinated lobbying association called the Honor Society Caucus, that also includes Phi Beta Kappa, Phi Kappa Phi, and Sigma Xi.

== Symbols ==
The Greek letters ΟΔΚ stand for the motto Ho Daph-no’-ko-mos Kük’-los or "The Laurel Crowned Circle". Omicron Delta Kappa's emblem is the Laurel Crowned Circle, representing the successes achieved through worthy undertakings. Its ideals or pillars are scholarship, service, integrity, character, and fellowship.

Omicron Delta Kappa's badge is a circular gold key with the Greek letters ΟΔΚ between two bars; the top bar has five stars and the bottom bar has the founding year 1914. The five stars represent the five major phases of college life—athletics, campus or community service, communications, creative and performing arts, and scholarship.

The society's colors are white, black, and light blue (sometime listed as sky blue). Graduating members wear honor cords of white, black, and light blue. Its flower is the blue delphinium. Its magazine is The Circle, first published on April 15, 1923. Its nickname is The Circle.

== Membership ==
Sophomores, juniors, seniors, and graduate students are recruited or tapped for membership based on five areas of campus life. Firstly, they must be in the top 35 percent of their class. Potential members are also evaluated on their leadership in academics and research; athletics; campus and community service; and university communication, such as journalism and speech; as well as the creative and performing arts. The society also selects faculty and alumni members based on character, achievement in college and community life, and consecration to democratic ideals. Chapters may also select honorary members.

Once a circle votes on who will be tapped for membership, it keeps that secret from all but those few chosen for initiation. Once tapped, each candidate must maintain the secret until the circle reveals it to the campus and community in a public ceremony, only after the circle has initiated the new members into the bonds of the society through its private ritual. At some institutions, such as the University of Missouri, with several such elite societies that tap new members, the public revelations are all held in conjunction, with an annual ceremonial Tap Day celebration on campus.

== Circles ==
Omicron Delta Kappa uses the term circle to indicate chapters. As of June 2023, it had chartered 435 circles in 39 states, with 287 being active. The practice of automatically designating circles with Greek letter names was abandoned in 1949, although some circles have adopted Greek letter nicknames in later years. Members who have died are said to have entered the Eternal Circle.

== Notable members ==
As of June 2023, Omicron Delta Kappa has initiated 350,000 members.
