= List of Davidson College people =

Davidson is a highly selective independent liberal arts college for 1,900 students located 20 minutes north of Charlotte in Davidson, North Carolina, United States. Since its establishment in 1837 by Presbyterians, the college has graduated 23 Rhodes Scholars and is consistently regarded as one of the top liberal arts colleges in the country. Through the Davidson Trust, the college became the first liberal arts institution in the nation to replace loans with grants in all financial aid packages, giving all students the opportunity to graduate debt-free.

The following is a list of notable people associated with Davidson College.

== Notable alumni ==
=== Academia ===
- William Wright Abbot, archivist, professor, and historian at George Washington University
- Graham T. Allison, professor at Harvard and author of Essence of Decision (did not graduate)
- Issac Bailey, professor
- Elizabeth Barnes, philosophy professor at the University of Virginia
- Philip Beidler, American literature professor
- Eugene C. Brooks, president of the University of North Carolina
- G. Thompson Brown (1921–2014), professor; founder of Honam Theological University and Seminary; missionary
- Roger H. Brown, president of Berklee College of Music
- Jennings Bryant, professor of communication at the University of Alabama
- Charles Cousar, New Testament scholar, author, Professor Emeritus at Columbia Theological Seminary
- James H. Daughdrill, Jr., president of Rhodes College
- Charles Till Davis, medieval historian
- Walter Edgar, historian
- Carl Elliott, philosopher
- James M. Farr, president of the University of Florida (1927–28); English language and literature scholar
- Mark S. George, professor of psychiatry, radiology and neurosciences and is the director of the Medical University of South Carolina
- Douglas A. Hicks, provost at Colgate University
- Daniel Harvey Hill, Jr., chancellor at North Carolina State University
- Calvin Howell, physicist and professor at Duke University
- Elizabeth Kiss, warden of the Rhodes Trust, former president of Agnes Scott College
- William Link, historian, academic and author
- Paul Marion, president of Tiffin University, Franklin College, and PA Association of Colleges and Universities; chancellor of State College System of West Virginia; director of Higher Education, State of Arkansas
- D. G. Martin, university administrator
- Evander Bradley McGilvary, philosopher
- Richard McIlwaine, president of Hampden-Sydney College
- Patrick D. Miller, Old Testament scholar
- William Andrew Moffett, historian and librarian
- John Wilson Moore, biophysicist; emeritus professor of Neurobiology at Duke University Medical School
- Michael Munger, professor at Duke University
- Guy L. Nesom, botanist at the University of Texas at Austin
- Harold Douglas Pratt Jr., ornithologist, wildlife photographer, and bird illustrator; research associate at the Louisiana State University
- Julius W. Pratt, historian specializing in foreign relations and imperialism
- James M. Robinson, religion scholar
- Holmes Rolston III, professor, theologian, philosopher; 2003 Templeton Prize recipient
- Thomas W. Ross, president of the University of North Carolina system
- C. Alphonso Smith, professor
- Glenn Terrell, president of Washington State University
- Sharon Thompson-Schill, psychology professor at the University of Pennsylvania
- Ann Tutwiler, fellow and instructor at Davidson College; deputy Director-General of the United Nations Food and Agriculture Organization

=== Art and architecture ===
- Burkey Belser, graphic designer and creator of the nutrition facts label
- George Watts Carr, architect
- McNair Evans, photographer
- Frank Gohlke, photographer (attended, but later transferred to The University of Texas at Austin)
- Elijah Gowin, photographer and Guggenheim Fellow
- Herb Jackson, contemporary artist
- Kesler Woodward, artist, art historian, and curator

=== Business ===
- James Batten, CEO of Knight-Ridder (1989–95)
- Irwin Belk, Belk businessman (transferred)
- John Belk, head of Belk
- John Chidsey, CEO of Subway (2019–present)
- Clayton Daley, former CFO of The Procter & Gamble Company
- Ervin Duggan, president of PBS
- Martin Daniel Eakes, CEO of Center for Responsible Lending
- Francis Henry Fries, textile magnet
- Nelson Z. Graves, developer
- Earl J. Hesterberg, H businessman
- Parameswaran Iyer, CEO of NITI Aayog; executive director at the World Bank Group representing India, Bangladesh, Bhutan, and Sri Lanka
- Justin Jenk, investor
- Lorie K. Logan, president and CEO of the Federal Reserve Bank of Dallas
- Stephen P. MacMillan, former CEO, president, and chairman of the board of Stryker Corp
- Jean Mauzé, banker
- John L. McLucas, CEO of MITRE Corporation; United States Secretary of the Air Force (1973–75);
- Jacqueline Musiitwa, businesswoman
- Lunsford Richardson, inventor of Vicks VapoRub and founder of Vicks
- Stephen Salyer, president and CEO of Salzburg Global Seminar; former CEO of Public Radio International
- Jack Wayman, creator of the Consumer Electronics Show
- William Winkenwerder, Jr., CEO of Highmark; chairman of CitiusTech; Assistant Secretary of Defense for Health Affairs

=== Entertainment ===
- Roxanne Beckford, actress
- Michael Brun, DJ
- Zachery Byrd, actor
- Rod Daniel, director
- Donald Davis, storyteller
- Craig Detweiler, screenwriter, cultural commentator
- Bertis Downs IV, manager of R.E.M.
- Kenan Ece, actor
- William R. Ferris, chairman of the National Endowment for the Humanities, 1997–2001; founding director, Center for the Study of Southern Culture
- John T. Fesperman, conductor and organist
- James Harding, director of BBC News and editor of The Times newspaper
- Jack Harris, local broadcaster from Tampa, Florida
- Margaret Hoover, political commentator and host of Firing Line
- Laeta Kalogridis, screenwriter and film producer
- Todd Kimsey, actor
- Stephen Andrew Lynch, film pioneer
- Jana Mashonee Sampson, Nammy Award-winning singer and Grammy nominee
- John Howell Morrison, composer
- Harry Pickens, pianist
- Tony Snow, White House Press Secretary (2006–07), syndicated talk radio host and Fox News Channel pundit
- John Starling, bluegrass musician
- Lester Strong, televions new anchor and host
- Nelson Sullivan, videographer and gay rights activist
- William Workman, opera singer

=== Government ===
- Mark Sandy, former director and assistant director of the Office of Management and Budget
- Michael R. Taylor, attorney with King & Spalding; Deputy Commissioner for Policy for the Food and Drug Administration; administrator of the Food Safety and Inspection Service

=== Law ===
- R. Stan Baker, federal judge
- Wade Barber, Superior Court judge in North Carolina (1998–2006)
- Kenneth B. Bell, justice of the Florida Supreme Court (2003–2008)
- James Edmund Boyd, United States federal judge
- Elizabeth L. Branch, federal judge
- Henry Gaston Bunn, Arkansas Supreme Court chief justice
- Armistead Burwell, associate justice of the North Carolina Supreme Court (1892–1894)
- William P. Bynum (1843) associate justice of the North Carolina Supreme Court and member of the North Carolina Senate
- Robert Allan Edgar, United States District Court for the Eastern District of Tennessee judge
- Conner Eldridge, US attorney for the United States District Court for the Western District of Arkansas
- Robert C. Ervin, North Carolina judge
- Sam J. Ervin IV, associate justice of the North Carolina Supreme Court (2015–present)
- Samuel James Ervin III, son of U.S. Senator Sam Ervin, judge of the United States Court of Appeals for the Fourth Circuit (1980–99)
- William Eskridge, legal theorist and professor at Yale Law School
- Vincent W. Foster, Jr., deputy White House counsel (1993)
- Vic Fleming, judge and teacher in Little Rock, Arkansas
- Vincent Foster, deputy White House counsel in the Bill Clinton administration (1993)
- James Hamilton, assistant chief counsel for the United States Senate Watergate Committee
- William J. Haynes, II, general counsel, U.S. Department of Defense
- Karen S. Marston, assistant US attorney
- Boyce Ficklen Martin, Jr., chief judge emeritus of the U.S. Court of Appeals for the Sixth Circuit
- Harry Martin, North Carolina Supreme Court justice
- John L. Napier, United States congressman; judge, U.S. Court of Federal Claims
- Frank I. Osborne, North Carolina attorney general
- James Dickson Phillips, Jr., judge of the United States Court of Appeals for the Fourth Circuit (1978–94)
- Sanford L. Steelman, Jr., North Carolina Court of Appeals judge
- Taylor Hudnall Stukes, South Carolina Supreme Court chief justice
- Alan Z. Thornburg, North Carolina Court of Appeals judge
- William Byrd Traxler, Jr., chief judge of the U.S. Court of Appeals for the Fourth Circuit (1998–present)
- Richard Lesley Voorhees, United States federal judge
- William Walter Wilkins, chief judge of the U.S. Court of Appeals for the Fourth Circuit (1986–2007)

=== Literature and journalism ===
- Vereen Bell, journalist and author
- Nicholas Carlson, global editor-in-chief of Insider
- Martin Clark, author
- Patricia Cornwell, author
- William Emerson, civil rights journalist for Newsweek; editor in chief of The Saturday Evening Post; left Davidson early to serve in World War II
- R. S. Gwynn, poet
- Sarah Frances Hardy, artist and author/illustrator, best known for her picture books
- John Hart, Edgar Award-winning author
- Alamgir Hashmi, poet, scholar
- Rebecca Hazelton, poet
- McKendree Long, artist, poet, known as "picture painter of the apocalypse"
- Charlie Lovett, best-selling author
- Hilary Masters, novelist
- Lenny McAllister, journalist and conservative activist
- Jason McManus, editor-in-chief of Time Inc. (1988–94)
- Robert Olmstead, novelist and educator
- Steph Post, author
- Sheri Reynolds, author, playwright
- Sudeep Sen, author
- Clint Smith, author
- Frank Soos, author, Flannery O'Connor Award for Short Fiction, Alaska State Writer Laureate
- Sudeep Sen, poet
- Clint Smith, writer for The Atlantic
- W. Dabney Stuart, poet
- William Styron, author; attended in 1942, left to join the Marines
- Chuck Sudetic, journalist
- William R. Trotter, author and historian
- Josh Voorhees, reporter for Slate
- Charles Wright, Pulitzer Prize; Bobbitt National Prize for Poetry recipient; chancellor of the Academy of American Poets; United States Poet Laureate

=== Medicine ===
- Ketan Ramanlal Bulsara, surgeon
- James E. Crowe, immunologist and pediatrician
- John Finklea, physician and public health administrator notable for his leadership of the Environmental Protection Agency's National Center for Environmental Research and the National Institute for Occupational Safety and Health
- Glenn A. Fry, optometrist
- Richard L. Guerrant, physician
- D. Neil Hayes, oncologist
- Wayne Jonas, director, National Instiutes of Health Office of Alternative Medicine
- Benjamin Lahey, epidemiologist
- Beaufort Longest, medical professional
- Sallie Permar, pediatrician
- David Resnik, bioethicist
- William Cumming Rose, determined essential amino acids for human nutrition
- Mary T. Martin Sloop, healthcare advocate
- David Talmage, immunologist
- Porter Paisley Vinson, surgeon at the Mayo Clinic

=== Military and defense ===
- Fred Borch, United States Army attorney and chief prosecutor of the Guantanamo military commissions
- William D. Halyburton, Jr., World War II Medal of Honor recipient
- Rufus G. Herring, World War II Medal of Honor recipient
- Samuel Reeves Keesler, World War I pilot
- William Lee J. Lowrance, Confederate Army colonel, businessman and pastor
- Prescott Prince, Navy captain, rule of law officer who defended Khalid Sheik Mohammed
- Stephen Dodson Ramseur, major general, Confederate Army
- Eric Rosenbach, Pentagon Chief of Staff and Assistant Secretary of Defense for Homeland Defense and Global Security
- Jack C. Stultz, lieutenant general; commanding general, United States Army Reserve

=== Politics ===
- James McNair Baker, Confederate senator
- Bruce W. Bannister, South Carolina legislator
- John Belk, mayor of Charlotte (1969–77)
- John Dillard Bellamy, United States congressman from North Carolina (1899–1903)
- Risden Tyler Bennett, United States congressman from North Carolina
- Kurt Biedenkopf, minister-president of Saxony (1990–2002) and president of the German Bundesrat (1999–2000); studied at Davidson 1949–50
- David Blount, member of the Mississippi Senate
- Yaroslav Brisiuck, Ukrainian diplomat
- Kenneth L. Brown, US ambassador to Ghana (1992–95)
- Josiah Abigail Patterson Campbell, Confederate politician
- Jay Chaudhuri, member of the North Carolina General Assembly
- Giorgio Rosso Cicogna, Italian diplomat
- J. Bayard Clark, United States congressman from North Carolina
- Dan Clodfelter, mayor of Charlotte (2014–2015), member of the North Carolina Senate (1999–2014)
- George Cretekos, mayor of Clearwater, Florida
- E. McA. Currie, mayor of Charlotte, North Carolina
- Howard Dyer, Mississippi state senator
- James F. Entwistle, US ambassador to Nigeria
- John M. Faison, United States congressman from North Carolina (1911–15)
- Bill Ferguson, member of the Maryland Senate
- Virgil Fludd, member of the Georgia House of Representatives
- Wyche Fowler, U.S. House of Representatives from Georgia (1977–1986), United States senator from Georgia (1986–1992), and United States ambassador to Saudi Arabia (1996–2000)
- Stanley H. Fox, North Carolina Assembly member
- Anthony Foxx, mayor of Charlotte, North Carolina (2009–13) and United States Secretary of Transportation (2013–17)
- David H. Gambrell, United States senator from Georgia (1971–72) (appointed)
- Robert Broadnax Glenn, governor of North Carolina
- George W. Gregory, Jr., member of the South Carolina House of Representatives
- Fletcher L. Hartsell, Jr., member of the North Carolina General Assembly
- David N. Henderson, United States congressman from North Carolina (1961–77)
- Jim Hodges, governor of South Carolina (1999–2003)
- James Holshouser, governor of North Carolina (1973–77)
- Max Hyde Jr., member of the South Carolina House of Representatives
- Hinton James, United States congressman from North Carolina (1930–31)
- Craig Leonard, Canadian politician
- Ed Lindsey, member of the Georgia House of Representatives
- Grier Martin, member of the North Carolina House of Representatives (2005–present)
- James G. Martin, governor of North Carolina (1985–93)
- Julie Mayfield, North Carolina state senator
- Larry McDonald, United States congressman from Georgia (1975–83); died 1983 when the Soviet Union shot down Korean Air Flight 007
- James Dalrymple McIver, member of the North Carolina General Assembly
- E. Blackburn Moore, speaker of the Virginia House of Delegates (1950–67)
- Greg Murphy, United States congressman from North Carolina (2019–present)
- Maston E. O'Neal, Jr., United States congressman from Georgia (1965–71)
- George Osborne, member of Parliament (2001–17) and chancellor of the Exchequer of the United Kingdom (2010–16); studied at Davidson as a Dean Rusk Scholar
- Carl C. Perkins, United States congressman from Kentucky (1984–93)
- Leonidas L. Polk, North Carolina Commissioner of Agriculture, North Carolina House of Representatives
- DuBose Porter, chair of the Georgia Democratic Party; former member of the Georgia House of Representatives
- William R. Purcell, member of the North Carolina Assembly
- James Graham Ramsay, Confederate politician
- Paul Renner, member of Florida House of Representatives
- Charlie Rose, United States congressman from North Carolina (1973–97)
- Dean Rusk, United States Secretary of State (1961–69)
- Buie Seawell, chief of staff to Gary Hart
- John Shott, member of the West Virginia House of Delegates
- Jasper K. Smith, member of the Louisiana House of Representatives (1944–48; 1952–64)
- John Spratt, United States congressman from South Carolina (1982–2011), former ranking Democrat on the House Budget Committee
- William Francis Stevenson, United States congressman from South Carolina (1917–33)
- T. Clarence Stone, North Carolina politician
- Koji Tomita, Japanese ambassador to Israel, South Korea, and the United States
- Mary Verner, mayor of Spokane, Washington (2007–2012)
- Page Walley, Tennessee state senator
- Woodrow Wilson, president of the United States and president of Princeton University (transferre

=== Religion ===
- Donald A. Crosby, philosopher
- Frances Taylor Gench, Presbyterian minister, New Testament scholar
- Douglas Oldenburg, president Emeritus at Columbia Theological Seminary; moderator of the 210th General Assembly of the Presbyterian Church
- Francis Wilson Price, missionary
- Edward V. Ramage, Presbyterian minister from Alabama
- Herbert Spaugh, bishop of the Moravian Church
- J. Rodman Williams, theologian and father of modern Renewal Theology

=== Science and technology ===
- William Appleton, technologist; programmer of the first rich media authoring tool World Builder
- Tom Marshburn, NASA astronaut

=== Sports ===
- Ryan Adeleye, Israeli-American professional soccer player (transferred)
- Peyton Aldridge, basketball player
- Fred Anderson, MLB player (transferred)
- Mik Aoki, baseball head coach of the University of Notre Dame (2011–present)
- Scotty Barr, MLB player
- Everett Booe, baseball player
- Brett Boretti, baseball head coach of the Columbia Lions (2006–present)
- John A. Brewin, college administrator
- De'Mon Brooks, basketball player
- Dougal M. Buie, college baseball coach
- Carl Cashion, baseball player
- Alex Caskey, MLS player with Seattle Sounders FC (2012–2013)
- Lloyd Christenbury, baseball player
- Rufe Clarke, baseball player
- Nik Cochran, professional basketball player
- Jake Cohen, American/Israeli professional basketball player for Maccabi Tel Aviv
- Pat Crawford, MLB player and member of the 1934 World Series St. Louis Cardinals
- Pete Crayton, college football coach
- Bart Creasman, professional soccer player
- Perry Crosswhite, Australian basketball player
- Stephen Curry, four-time NBA champion and two-time Most Valuable Player with the Golden State Warriors
- Chris Czerapowicz, basketball player
- Kevin Donnalley, former NFL player
- Tom Dore, college basketball player
- Norman B. Edgerton, college football coach
- Robert Eenhoorn, MLB player
- Bruce Elder, basketball player
- Bill Fetzer, college baseball, basketball, and football coach
- Buck Flowers, football player
- Robyn Fralick, basketball coach
- Alex Gibbs, assistant head coach of the Houston Texans (2008–10)
- Conor Grace, basketball player
- Kellan Grady, basketball player
- H. M. Grey, college football coach and player
- Jón Axel Guðmundsson, basketball player
- Steve Heckard, former NFL player
- Fred Hetzel, NBA basketball player (1965–71)
- Terry Holland, basketball coach at Davidson (1969–74), University of Virginia (1974–90)
- Pete Hughes, baseball head coach of the Oklahoma Sooners (2012–present)
- Oliver Huie, college football coach
- Lee Hyun-jung, college basketball player
- Fred Johnston, MLB player
- Tyler Kalinoski, basketball player
- Dean Keener, college basketball player, coach, and commentator
- George M. King, college football player
- Rod Knowles, professional basketball player
- Flake Laird, college football, baseball, and basketball coach and player
- Sam Lanford, professional baseball player
- Mike Maloy, ABA and overseas basketball player
- Dick Marlowe, baseball player
- Buck Marrow, baseball player
- Bill Masse, baseball player
- Matt Matheny, Elon basketball coach
- Bob McKillop, former head coach Davidson College, inductee NYC Basketball HOF, inductee NC Sports HOF, inductee Davidson Athletics HOF, inductee Southern Conference HOF, 2026 nominee Naismith Basketball HOF
- Eric Minkin (born 1950), American-Israeli basketball player
- Paul Nichols, football coach
- Matt Pacifici, soccer player
- Chris Pollard, baseball head coach of Duke University (2012–present)
- Caroline Queen, 2012 USA Olympic whitewater slalom K-1 kayaker
- Charlie Reiter (born 1988), professional soccer player
- Jason Richards, basketball player and college basketball assistant
- Jennifer Roos, women's college basketball coach
- Derek Rucker, Australian basketball player
- Dan Simonds, MLB player
- Dick Snyder, NBA basketball player (1966–79)
- Matt Spear, Davidson soccer coach
- Robert Ukrop, professional soccer player
- Bob Vail, baseball player
- Brandon Williams, basketball player and NBA minor league coach
- Shirley Wilson, football coach
- Brendan Winters, professional basketball player
- William L. Younger, college football coach

== Current and former faculty ==
- Frank Albinder
- Dorothy Allison
- Pinckney Benedict
- Jonathan Berkey
- John M. Bevan
- William Bodiford
- James Bumgardner
- George Arthur Buttrick
- Katie Cannon
- Tim Chartier
- Henri Cole
- Maurice Garland Fulton
- Douglas Glover
- Karmella Haynes
- Laurie Heyer
- Daniel Harvey Hill
- David Kaylor
- John Lycan Kirkpatrick
- Arturo Lindsay
- Robert Maier
- Jagoda Marinić
- James G. Martin
- Leemon McHenry
- S. Brooks McLane
- Alfred Mele
- Kenneth Menkhaus
- Mark R. Nemec
- Guy Owen
- Julio Ramirez
- Wendy Raymond
- Sheri Reynolds
- Wilson Gaines Richardson
- Elijah Frink Rockwell
- Lewis Bevens Schenck
- Nirmal Selvamony
- John Bunyan Shearer
- Henry Louis Smith
- Patrick J. Sparrow
- Terese Svoboda
- Rosemarie Tong
- Ken Urban
- Clare Venables
- Russ Warren
- George H. Weems
- Al Young

== Presidents of the college ==
=== Presidents of Davidson College ===
- Rev. Robert Hall Morrison (1836–40)
- Rev. Samuel Williamson (1841–54)
- Rev. Drury Lacy, Jr. (1855–60)
- Rev. John Lycan Kirkpatrick (1860–66)
- Rev. George Wilson McPhail (1866–71)
- Prof. John Rennie Blake, chairman (1871–77)
- Rev. Andrew Dousa Hepburn (1877–85)
- Rev. Luther McKinnon (1885–88)
- Col. William Joseph Martin, acting (1887–88)
- Rev. John Bunyan Shearer (1888–1901)
- Dr. Henry Louis Smith (1901–12)
- Dr. William Joseph Martin, Jr. (1912–29)
- Rev. Walter Lee Lingle (1929–41)
- Dr. John Rood Cunningham (1941–57)
- Prof. Clarence John Pietenpol, acting (1957–58)
- David Grier Martin (1958–68)
- Prof. Frontis W. Johnston, acting (1968)
- Dr. Samuel Reid Spencer, Jr. (1968–83)
- Prof. Frontis W. Johnston, acting (1983–84)
- Dr. John Kuykendall (1984–97)
- Robert F. Vagt (1997–2007)
- Thomas Warren Ross (2007–10)
- Dr. John Kuykendall, acting (2010–11)
- Dr. Carol Quillen (2011–2022)
- Dr. Douglas A. Hicks (2022–present)
