= Gary M. Reiner =

American business executive

- Born: Gary M. Reiner; 1954 (age 71–72)

Gary M. Reiner (born c. 1954) is an American businessman and former operating partner at General Atlantic, a growth equity investment firm. Prior to General Atlantic, Reiner served as senior vice president and chief information officer at General Electric.

== Early career and education ==
Reiner received his bachelor's degree in economics from Harvard College in 1976, and earned his M.B.A. from Harvard Business School in 1980.

In 1980, Reiner began working at Boston Consulting Group, a management consulting firm, in its Boston and New York City offices. In 1986, he was elected partner. Reiner's work focused on strategic and process issues for high-technology businesses.

== General Electric (1991 - 2010) ==
Reiner joined General Electric in 1991 as Vice President-Corporate Business Development where he was responsible for evaluating new business ideas and acquisitions, strategic planning, company-wide sourcing, and driving best practices throughout the business.

In 1996, he was made Senior Vice President and CIO and led the company's Six Sigma Quality initiative, driving process implementation and program execution across all GE businesses.

== General Atlantic (2010 - 2024) ==
In 2010, Reiner left General Electric and joined General Atlantic as an investment advisor. Reiner currently serves as Operating Partner for the firm. Reiner supports General Atlantic's efforts to partner with growth companies, and provides strategic counsel to the firm and its portfolio companies.

Reiner currently holds board positions on five of its portfolio companies, CitiusTech, JumpCloud, Seismic Software, ThreatLocker and Turbonomic.

== Board memberships ==
- Hewlett-Packard (2011 – present)
- Citigroup (2013 – present)
- CitiusTech (2014 – present)
- Seismic Software (2015 – present)
- Turbonomic (2017 – present)
- JumpCloud (2019 – present)
- Norwalk Hospital (2006 - 2016)
- AppDynamics (2016 - present)

== Norwalk Hospital ==
From 2006 to October 2016 Reiner was on the board of trustees for Norwalk Hospital, a Connecticut not-for-profit hospital that is now a part of Western Connecticut Health Network.
