= Cicogna =

Cicogna is an Italian surname meaning "stork". Notable people with the surname include:

- Emmanuele Antonio Cicogna (1789–1868), Italian writer, scholar and book collector
- Giorgio Rosso Cicogna (born 1945), Italian diplomat
- Marina Cicogna (1934–2023), Italian film producer and photographer
- Pasquale Cicogna, Doge of Venice from 1585 to 1595
