= Kesler Woodward =

American artist, art historian and curator

- Born: Kesler Edward Woodward; 1951 (age 74–75); Aiken, South Carolina
- Known for: Landscape painting
- Movement: Realism
- Awards: 2004 Alaska Governor's Award for Lifetime Achievement in the Arts, 2012 Distinguished Artist Award (Rasmuson Foundation)
- Website: Artist website

Kesler Edward "Kes" Woodward (born 1951) is an American artist, art historian and curator. Known for his colorful paintings of northern landscapes, he was awarded the first Alaska Governor's Award for Lifetime Achievement in the Arts in 2004. Woodward has also written extensively on the Art of the circumpolar North and has curated exhibitions which have toured Alaska, California, Oregon, Washington, and Georgia.

The North dominates Woodward's oeuvre and his iconography of ravens, canyons, sandbars and black spruce has been described as “deeply evocative of Alaska”. Considered one of "Alaska's most innovative artists", author Julie Decker noted that, unlike traditional landscape painters, "His focus is as much on the character of the media as it is on the subject matter." Woodward works in oils, oil pastels, and acrylics and has described his artistic process as "applying, scraping away, modifying, and building up other colors ... to achieve a sense of how I felt, being in a certain place, more than just how that place looked." Birch trees, his signature subject, are painted to be both representational and, when viewed up close, abstract. Although a "realist", his graphic compositions prompted ARTnews reviewer Richard Maschal to add, "his interest and strategy veer toward abstraction. Whether the spaces are wide-open or confined, Woodward depicts them as flattened areas with foreground and background pressed together and the whole reduced to pattern."

== Early life ==
Kesler Edward Woodward was born in Aiken, South Carolina in 1951. After high school, Woodward enrolled as a chemistry major at Davidson College in Davidson, North Carolina. Following an introductory painting course and visit to the National Gallery in Washington, he developed an interest in contemporary abstract art. At Davidson, he studied painting under Herb Jackson and graduated with a Bachelor of Arts (Art) in 1973. He continued his studies in painting and printmaking and graduated in 1977 with a Master of Fine Art from Idaho State University, (Pocatello). Woodward then moved to Juneau, Alaska, and began to incorporate landscape into his art. His work was influenced by artists Richard Long (artist), Andy Goldsworthy, and Hamish Fulton, and by 1982 landscape was his dominant genre.

== Career ==
=== Early career ===
Woodward was first appointed Curator of Temporary Exhibits (1977-1978), and then Curator of Visual Arts (1979-1981) at the Alaska State Museum (Juneau). He was also appointed Artistic Director at the Visual Arts Center of Alaska in Anchorage (1978-1979). In 1981 he moved to Fairbanks to teach art at the University of Alaska Fairbanks and was then appointed Director, University of Alaska Fine Arts Gallery (1982-1988). In 1989 he curated Sydney Laurence: Painter of the North held at the Anchorage Museum of History and Art, the Whatcom Museum of History and Art (Bellingham, WA), the Oregon Historical Society Museum (Portland), and the Palm Springs Desert Museum. During that time, he was commissioned to provide paintings for the 1988 Alaska's Governor's Awards for the Arts, and a painting was featured on the poster for the 1988 Alaska-Canada Arctic Winter Games.

=== 1990s ===
In 1991, Woodward was appointed Academic Affiliate Fine Arts Collection at the University of Alaska Museum (Fairbanks). He was also appointed Chair of the Art Department (1995-1998) and Chair of the Division of Arts and Communications from (1996-1998) at the University of Alaska Fairbanks. During this period he curated the exhibition Spirit of the North: The Art of Eustace Paul Ziegler at the Anchorage Museum of History and Art (1996-1998). Increasingly known as an artist, his work was selected for the 1992 Contemporary Art from Alaska exhibition at the Magadan Civic Gallery (Magadan, Russia). Solo exhibitions of his work were held at University of Alabama-Huntsville in 1990; at the Anchorage Museum of History and Art, the University of Alaska Anchorage Fine Arts Gallery, and the Anderson Center for the Arts (Anderson SC) in 1994; and at Jerald Melberg Gallery (Charlotte NC) in 1990, 1993, and 1997. He was commissioned to create four large paintings for the Elmendorf Pacific Rim Hospital (Anchorage, AK) in 1997. His paintings also illustrated Frank Soos' 1999 book Bamboo Fly Rod Suite: Reflections on Fishing and the Geography of Grace.

=== 2000s ===
In 2000, Woodward retired as Professor of Art at the University of Alaska Fairbanks to paint full-time, receiving emeritus status from the university. The following year, he was appointed the Harriman Scholar and Expedition Artist for the 1899 Harriman Expedition Retraced. He also curated the touring exhibition A Northern Adventure: The Art of Fred Machetanz (1908-2002) viewed at the Anchorage Museum of History and Art, the Morris Museum of Art (Augusta, GA) and the Alaska State Museum. His painting drew national attention when his work was reviewed in ARTnews in July 2001 and appeared in Harper's Magazine in January 2002. Woodward was commissioned to provide four large paintings for the Holy Family Chapel at Immaculate Conception Catholic School in Fairbanks in 2002. He also received public commissions for the Rabinowitz Courthouse (Fairbanks, AK) in 2004, and for the Anchorage International Airport in 2009. During this time solo exhibitions of his work were held at the Morris Museum of Art (Augusta GA), and at Jerald Melberg Gallery (Charlotte NC) in 2001; at the University of Alaska, and Kenai Campus Art Gallery in 2003; and at the Aiken Center for the Arts (Aiken, SC) in 2009. His paintings were also published in Peggy Shumaker's book of poems Blaze.

=== 2010s ===
In 2011, Woodward's art was featured in exhibitions at the Alaska State Museum (Juneau) and the Pratt Museum (Homer, AK). Solo exhibitions of his work were held at the Christa Faut Gallery (Cornelius, NC) in 2011, at Vashon Allied Arts Gallery (Vashon, WA) in 2012, and at gallery Beaux-Arts des Amériques (Montreal) in 2013. His paintings illustrated John Morgan's 2014 book of poems Rivers of Light. Woodward lives and works in Fairbanks, Alaska.

== Contributions ==
Woodward has painted the North from Hudson Bay to the High Arctic and from British Columbia to Alaska and Siberia. Art Historian Estill Curtis Pennington wrote "Kes Woodward seems to bring the full authority of a carefully studied art historical tradition to ... sweeping visions of the seemingly measureless Alaska turf." In The Artist and the American Landscape John Driscoll wrote of the artist's “simple and compelling devotion to nature’s beauty and tranquility.” In Icebreakers: Alaska's Most Innovative Artists, Julie Decker described his work as "approachable both as color field abstractions as well as depictions of real or synthesized places." In November 2004 Woodward received the Governor's Lifetime Achievement Award for the Arts. Woodward was also awarded the Rasmuson Foundation's 2012 Distinguished Artist Award "in recognition of an Alaskan artist's creative excellence and superior accomplishments in the arts". He has also served on the boards of the Alaska Arts and Culture Foundation, the Western States Arts Federation, and the Alaska State Council on the Arts.

As art historian and curator, Woodward authored six books on Alaskan art including the first survey of fine arts in Alaska, Painting in the North and Painting Alaska, as well as Spirit of the North: The Art of Eustace Paul Ziegler, A Northern Adventure: The Art of Fred Machetanz (1908-2002). During the 1990s, he also authored "The Changing Image of the Native Alaskan in the Work of Explorer Artists", published in Enlightenment and Exploration in the North Pacific, 1741-1805; "Persuasive Images: The Arctic Photographs of Vilhjalmur Stefansson", presented at the British Museum and published in Imaging the Arctic; and "Contemporary Cree Art in Northern Quebec", published in Social and Environmental Impacts of the James Bay Hydroelectric Project. In 2007, he also contributed to Thin ice: Inuit traditions within a changing environment. Since 1991 Woodward has been an External Research Associate, Arctic Studies Institute at Dartmouth College (Hanover NH), and was also Director of Fine Arts and Humanities Projects (1988-1991), at Dartmouth's Institute on Canada and the United States.

His paintings are found in the public collections of the Morris Museum of Art (Augusta GA), Tacoma Art Museum (Tacoma WA), Anchorage Museum of History and Art (Anchorage), Alaska State Museum (Juneau), University of Alaska Museum (Fairbanks), and the Alaska Contemporary Art Bank (Anchorage).

Public Art
- Seasons of Praise Holy Family Catholic Chapel, Fairbanks AK
- Higher Ground 2004 Two large paintings for Rabinowitz Courthouse, Fairbanks AK (Alaska Public Art Commission)
- Subarctic Spring, Winter Light, Summer Forest, Fall Color Title 1997 Four 15-foot paintings for the Elmendorf Pacific Rim Hospital, Elmendorf Air Force Base Anchorage AK (a federal public art commission)
- Canopy 2009 Anchorage International Airport (State of Alaska public art commission)
Museum and Public Exhibitions

Selected solo, 2- or 3-person exhibitions

- 2011 Alaska State Museum, Juneau, Alaska
- 2011 Pratt Museum, Homer, Alaska
- 2009 Aiken Center for the Arts, Aiken SC (solo)
- 2002 University of Alaska, Kenai Campus Art Gallery, Kenai AK (solo)
- 2001 Morris Museum of Art, Augusta GA (solo)
- 1995 Civic Center Gallery, Fairbanks AK (solo)
- 1994 Alaska Pacific University, Anchorage AK (solo)
- 1994 Anderson Art Center, Anderson SC (solo)
- 1991 Anchorage Museum of History and Art, Anchorage AK (solo)
- 1991 University of Alaska Anchorage Fine Arts Gallery, Anchorage AK (solo)
- 1990 University of Alabama-Huntsville Fine Arts Gallery, Huntsville AL (solo)

Selected invitational or juried group exhibitions

- 2014-5 Voices of the Wilderness US Fish and Wildlife Service/National Park Service, Chugach National Forest AK
- 2009 Ascension: Exploring the Art of Denali University of Alaska Museum of the North, Fairbanks AK
- 2009 International Polar Year 2009 Civic Center Gallery, Fairbanks AK
- 2009 Confluence: Artists of the North Cascades North Cascades Institute/Smith Vallee Gallery, Edison WA
- 2007 Stick and Stones: Alaskan Structure Kenai Cultural Center, Kenai AK
- 2006 Blanchard Mountain: A Special Place Edison Eye Gallery, Edison WA
- 2005 Skagit Valley Artists Edison Eye Gallery, Edison WA
- 2003 Wetlands Pratte Museum, Homer AK
- 2001 Letters Home Fairbanks Arts Association, Fairbanks AK
- 1992 Contemporary Art from Alaska Magadan Civic Gallery, Magadan, Russia
- 1991 South Carolina Artists Greenville Museum of Art, Greenville, SC
Gallery Exhibitions

Solo exhibitions

- 2014 Blue Hollomon Gallery, Anchorage AK
- 2013 Beaux-Arts des Amériques, Montreal, Canada
- 2012 Vashon Allied Arts Gallery, Vashon WA
- 2011 Christa Faut Gallery, Cornelius NC
- 2007 Artique, Ltd Gallery, Anchorage AK
- 2007 Bunnell Street Gallery, Homer AK
- 2004 Well Street Art Gallery, Fairbanks AK
- 2002 New Horizons Gallery, Fairbanks AK
- 2002 Decker-Morris Gallery, Anchorage AK
- 2001 Jerald Melberg Gallery, Charlotte NC
- 2001 Well Street Art Gallery, Fairbanks AK
- 2001 New Horizons Gallery, Fairbanks AK
- 1999 Decker-Morris Gallery, Anchorage AK
- 1999 New Horizons Gallery, Fairbanks AK
- 1997 Jerald Melberg Gallery, Charlotte NC
- 1996 Site 250 Gallery, Fairbanks AK
- 1996 Decker-Morris Gallery, Anchorage AK
- 1994 Site 250 Gallery, Fairbanks AK
- 1993 Jerald Melberg Gallery, Charlotte NC
- 1992 Stonington Gallery, Anchorage AK
- 1990 Jerald Melberg Gallery, Charlotte NC
Books and Papers
- Painting Alaska. Anchorage: Alaska Geographic Society. Alaska Geographic. Vol. 27. No. 3. 2000.
- Under Northern Lights: Artists and Writers in the Alaska Landscape. Kesler Woodward and Frank Soos, eds. Seattle: University of Washington Press. 2000.
- Spirit of the North: The Art of Eustace Paul Ziegler. Morris Museum of Art. Augusta, Georgia. 1998.
- Painting in the North: Alaskan Art in the Anchorage Museum of History and Art. Seattle: University of Washington Press and Anchorage: Anchorage Museum of History and Art. 1993. ISBN 0-295-97320-X
- Sydney Laurence, Painter of the North. Seattle: University of Washington Press and Anchorage: Anchorage Museum of History and Art. 1989

Papers

- "Contemporary Cree Art in Northern Quebec," In: Social and Environmental Impacts of the James Bay Hydroelectric Project. James F. Hornig, ed. Montreal: McGill-Queen's University Press. 1999.
- "Persuasive Images: The Arctic Photographs of Vilhjalmur Stefansson," In: Imaging the Arctic. London: The British Museum Press. 1998.
- "The Changing Image of the Native Alaskan in the Work of Explorer Artists". In: Enlightenment and Exploration in the North Pacific, 1741-1805. Stephen Haycox, James Barnett, and Caedmon Liburd, eds. Seattle: University of Washington Press and Anchorage: Cook Inlet Historical Society 1997.
