= 1707 in poetry =

This article covers 1707 in poetry. Nationality words link to articles with information on the nation's poetry or literature (for instance, Irish or France).

== Works published ==
- Elizabeth Bradford and William Bradford write prefatory poems for Benjamin Keach's War with the Devil, Colonial America
- Samuel Cobb, Poems on Several Occasions
- Benjamin Colman, "A Poem on Elijah's Translation, occasioned by the death of Rev. Samuel Willard", delivered as a sermon at Willard's funeral, the longest of Colman's poems; English Colonial America
- Poems on Affairs of State, including the first publication together of Shakespeare's Venus and Adonis and The Rape of Lucrece
- John Pomfret, Quae Rara, Chara: A poem on Panthea's confinement
- Charles Sedley, The Poetical Works
- Nahum Tate, The Triumph of Union
- Isaac Watts, Hymns and Spiritual Songs, the first of many editions throughout the 18th century and afterward
- John Wilmot, Earl of Rochester, The Miscellaneous Works of the Right Honourable the Late Earls of Rochester And Roscommon. With The Memoirs of the Life and Character of the late Earl of Rochester, in a Letter to the Dutchess of Mazarine. By Mons. St. Evremont, London: Printed & sold by B. Bragge; second edition in the same year, London: Printed for Edmund Curll (third edition, 1709)

== Births ==
Death years link to the corresponding "[year] in poetry" article:

- March 26 – Mather Byles, (died 1788), English Colonial American clergyman and poet
- December 18 – Charles Wesley (died 1788), English Methodist clergyman and hymn writer

== Deaths ==
Birth years link to the corresponding "[year] in poetry" article:

- March 30 – Henry Hall (born 1656), English poet and composer of church music
- September 15 – George Stepney (born 1663), English poet and diplomat
- September 18 – Petter Dass (born c.1647/8), Norwegian poet
- September 23 – John Tutchin (born c. 1661), English radical Whig controversialist, gadfly journalist and poet
- September 24 – Vincenzo da Filicaja (born 1642), Italian poet
- Also:
  - Takarai Kikaku 宝井其角, also known as "Enomoto Kikaku" (born 1661), Japanese haiku poet and disciple of Matsuo Bashō
  - Wali Mohammed Wali, also known as Wali Deccani and Wali Aurangabadi (born 1667), Indian, Urdu-language poet

== See also ==
- Poetry
- List of years in poetry
- List of years in literature

== Notes ==
- "A Timeline of English Poetry" Web page of the Representative Poetry Online Web site, University of Toronto
