= Calvin Howell =

American physicist (born 1955)

Calvin R. Howell
- Born: December 7, 1955 (age 70); Warrenton, North Carolina
- Education: Davidson College BS; Duke University PhD
- Scientific career
- Fields: Physicist
- Workplaces: Duke University; TUNL
- Thesis: Neutron scattering from ^{28}Si and ^{32}S : cross sections and analyzing powers from 8 to 40 Mev (1984)
- Doctoral advisor: Richard L. Walter

Calvin Rudolph Howell (born December 7, 1955) is an American physicist and professor at Duke University in Durham, North Carolina.

== Early life and education ==
Howell was born in Warrenton, North Carolina in 1955. Howell was one of six children raised by his mother Virginia Talley and his father William Howell, a cement finisher. He was raised in Palmer Springs, Virginia, attending Roanoke Elementary School and later Park View High School in South Hill, Virginia.

After high school, Howell attended Davidson College in Davidson, North Carolina, on a scholarship. His junior year of college was spent in an exchange program at Howard University in Washington D.C. Howell graduated in 1978 with a Bachelor of Science degree in physics. Following his graduation from Davidson College, Howell began graduate studies in experimental nuclear physics at Duke University in Durham, North Carolina. There, he worked in the lab of Richard Lawrence Walter, with his doctoral studies culminating in his dissertation on the neutron scattering cross sections of silicon and sulfur entitled "Neutron scattering from ^{28}Si and ^{32}S: cross sections and analyzing powers from 8 to 40 MeV".

After completing his PhD, Howell remained in Durham and worked for a year as a postdoctoral fellow at the Triangle Universities Nuclear Laboratory (TUNL). During this time, Howell also served as an instructor at Duke University.

== Career ==
Immediately following his postdoctoral fellowship, Howell joined the faculty at Duke University in a tenure track position as assistant professor of physics. During his time as assistant professor, Howell worked as a visiting scientist at Los Alamos National Laboratory and the Stanford Linear Accelerator, where he studied the substructure of the nucleons which make up atomic nuclei. In 1992, Howell received tenure at Duke University and was promoted to associate professor. His external research continued at the Thomas Jefferson National Accelerator Facility during this time. Howell became a full professor at Duke in 2001, when he was also hired as deputy director of TUNL. Howell would continue as deputy director until he became director of TUNL in 2006, a post he served in until 2016. Howell also served as director of the Duke free electron laser (FEL) from 2008 to 2011.

In 2006, Howell became a Fellow of the American Physical Society "For precision measurements of the nucleon-nucleon interaction in few-body systems using polarization observables and for service to the scientific community, especially, by mentoring students at historically black colleges and universities."

Howell's scholarship focuses on experiments probing the quantum chromodynamic (QCD) description of nucleons. He tests theoretical predictions of the behavior of low-energy few-nucleon systems to shed light on the strong force via which these nucleons interact. This work spans nuclear physics, nuclear security, and medical isotope production. Much of his research is conducted at the high intensity gamma-ray source at TUNL.

== Service and mentoring ==
Howell has an award-winning record of service to the Physics community. Howell served as the Nuclear Physics Program Direction for the National Science Foundation in 1998, and has held various positions within the American Physical Society, including serving on the executive committee of the Southeastern Section and of the Division of Nuclear Physics. Howell has most recently been awarded the Francis Slack Award at the Southeastern Section of the American Physical Society annual meeting in 2025.

Throughout his career, Howell has focused on providing academic opportunities to minoritized students, serving as an adjunct professor at North Carolina Central University, a historically black institution. To this end, he has also served as the Faculty Mentor for the Carolina Ohio Science Education Network, acted as Faculty Coordinator for the Mellon Minority Undergraduate Program at Duke University, and been the Academic Coordinator for the Minority Medical Education Program at the Duke University Medical Center. Howell has also chaired the American Physical Society's Committee on Minorities in Physics.
