= Elizabeth Bradford =

American painter

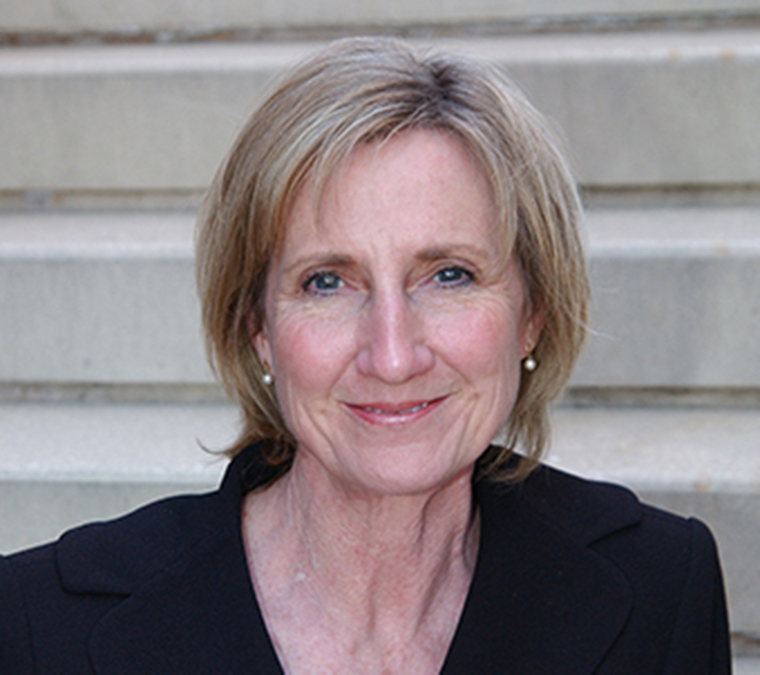
- Bradford at her studio 2015
- Born: December 20, 1950; North Carolina, United States
- Education: Randolph Macon Woman's College; University of North Carolina, Chapel Hill
- Known for: Landscape painting
- Notable work: Trees and Water

Elizabeth Bradford is an American artist living in Davidson, North Carolina, best known for her large-scale paintings of landscapes. Her works have been widely exhibited throughout the southeastern United States and are collected in museums and collections, both private and corporate, across the country.

== Biography ==
Bradford's North Carolina roots go back to the early 1700s; the farm she lives on was bought by her great grandfather in 1890. Growing up in rural North Carolina, Elizabeth Bradford says that as a child, she felt "caged", but that in making art, she found freedom from control. While in college at the University of North Carolina, Chapel Hill, she took a trip to the Sahara desert which influenced her appreciation for the greatness of the outdoors. Her paintings, which depict wild landscapes, are a way of breaking free for her.

She raised three sons on her grandfather's farm in Mecklenburg County, NC. Her family and family history often feature prominently in her paintings, including some of the 366 paintings that make up The Painted Journal, a printed record of her 49th birthday challenge to create a painting every day for a year over the course of 1999-2000. These subjects include paintings from a lily pool made by her great grandfather to eggs gathered from her brother's chickens.

== Work ==
Bradford's work, most often large landscapes painted with bright colors, displays "a startling and unusual sense of color" according to art critic and curator Carla Hanzal. She draws her inspiration from the "really big cathedral" of outdoor life, often venturing into the woods and the National parks, hiking or kayaking, to find subjects for her paintings. She calls her work "existential landscapes" and states bluntly the reason behind her paintings: "It's about human life and what it's like to live in the world." Trees and tree roots, rocks and rivers, feature prominently in her paintings. Her canvases capture landscapes spanning from the North Carolina hills to the Everglades, Cumberland Island in Georgia, and even to international locations such as Greece and France, where she has spent time in artist residences. Lee Carol Giduz, executive director of the Blowing Rock Art and History Museum emphasizes the powerful evocation of nature in Bradford's work: "Her bold strokes and vibrant palette make trees grow and water flow."

Bradford admits the influence of painters such as Neil Welliver and Herb Jackson in her pursuit to create art, as well as the iconic Vincent Van Gogh. Additional influences include the Pattern and Decoration movement of the 1970s, late 19th century painters, and the artists of Abstract Expressionism. She began her art career drawing with colored pencils on paper before advancing to painting with gouache. She currently uses acrylic on canvas and wood.

== Themes ==
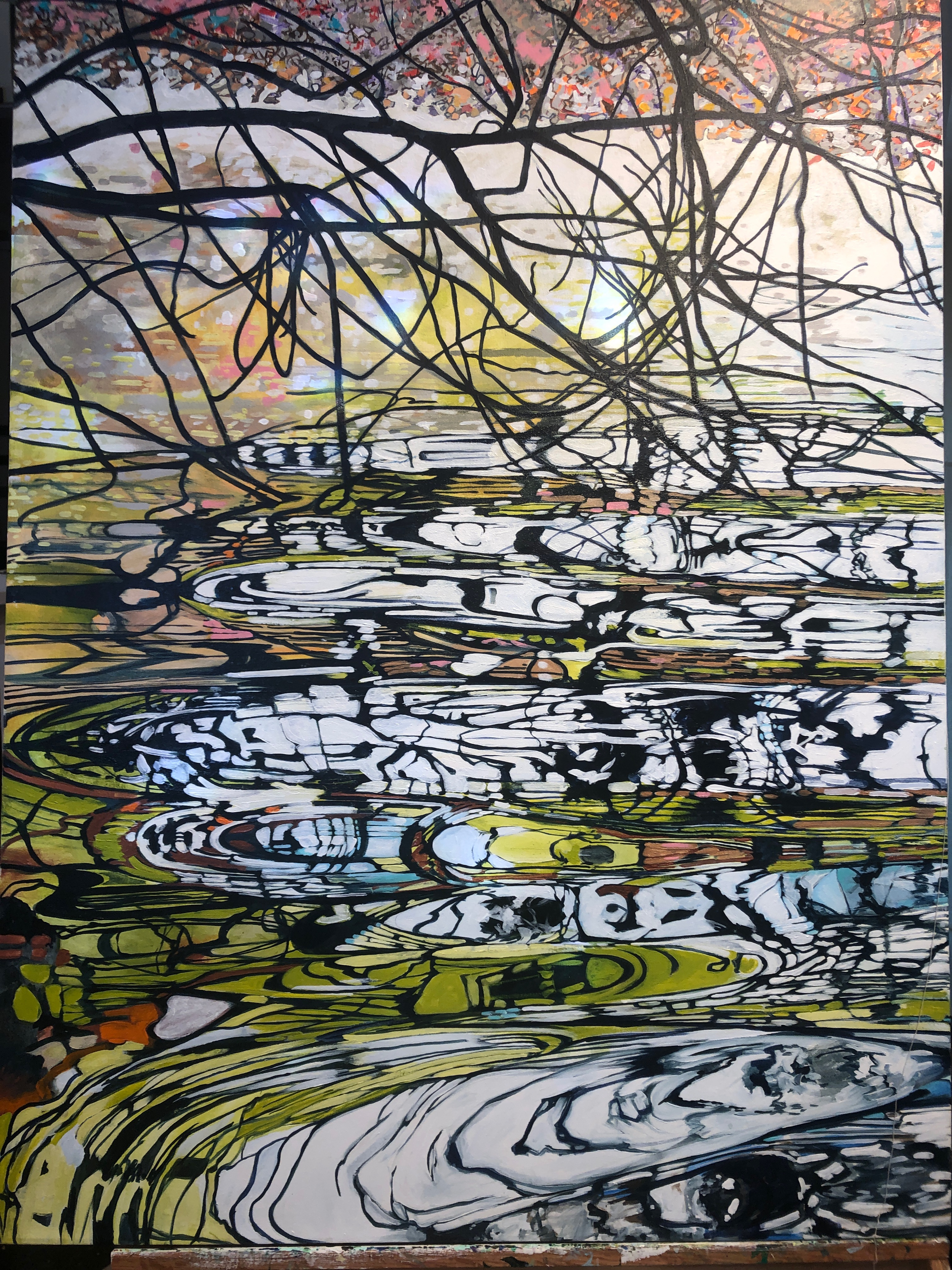
Overhanging Limb, South Mountain

Repeated themes in Bradford's work include the expanse of nature, the expression of time, beauty and pattern in the natural world and the politics of the environment. At the same time, her paintings focus on the nuances of color. In the introduction to The Painted Journal, Nina Serebrennikov, art historian at Davidson College, underscores "Bradford's deeply ingrained understanding of the nuances of color [from] the fruit of repeated experimentation as well as studying the master colorists of the past (p. 2)."

== Exhibitions ==
- 2025, Solo exhibition, "Warp Weft Water Weeds", Davidson College Art Galleries, Davidson, NC
- 2021, Solo exhibition, "A House of One Room", Cameron Art Museum, Wilmington, NC
- 2021, Solo exhibition, "New Work", Hidell Brooks Gallery, Charlotte, NC
- 2019 “Arboreal”, Moss Art Center, Virginia Tech, Blacksburg, VA
- 2019 “Elizabeth Bradford:Time +Terrain”, Franklin G Burroughts- Simeon B Chapin Art Museum, Myrtle Beach, SC
- 2019 “What Wild Life Left”, Anything Anywhere Incorporated, Brooklyn, NY
- 2018 Solo Exhibition, “Entanglements”, The Mahler Fine Art, Raleigh, NC Elizabeth Bradford
- 2018 Solo Exhibition, “New Work”, The Umstead, Raleigh, NC
- 2016 Solo Exhibition “Elizabeth Bradford: Time + Terrain”, Blowing Rock Art and History Museum, Blowing Rock, NC, curated by Carla Hanzal
- 2016 Solo Exhibition “Persistence of Eden”, Hood College, Frederick, MD
- 2015 “Reclaiming Nature: Art and Sustainability”, Weatherspoon Art Museum, University of North Carolina at Greensboro, NC
- 2014 “Visions of Spring”, Les Yeux du Monde, Charlottesville, VA
- 2010 Solo Exhibition, “What the Day Brought”, Waterworks Visual Arts Center, Salisbury, NC
- 2010 Solo Exhibition, “The Year of Silence and Blooming”, Christa Faut Gallery, Cornelius, NC
- 2008 Solo Exhibition, “Two Mile Radius”, Christa Faut Gallery
- 2006 “The Southern Landscape”, Duke University Law School Gallery, Duke University, Durham, NC
- 2006 “The Southern Landscape” invitational, Lee Hansley Gallery, Raleigh, NC
- 2006 Solo Exhibition, “Recent Work”, Christa Faut Gallery
- 2004 Solo Exhibition, “Dream and Metaphor”, Christa Faut Gallery
- 2002 Solo Exhibition, “Water, Earth, Sky”, Christa Faut Gallery
- 2002 Solo Exhibition, Cleveland Springs Fine Art, Shelby, NC
- 2000 Solo Exhibition, “Three Hundred & Sixty Six Days”, Christa Faut Gallery
- 1998 Solo Exhibition, “New Work”, Christa Faut Gallery
- 1996 Solo Exhibition, “Woman’s Work”, Christa Faut Gallery
- 1995 Solo Exhibition,” Paintings and Prints”, University of North Carolina at Charlotte, Cone Center Gallery, Charlotte, NC
- 1994 Solo Exhibition, “Blues Poetry”, Christa Faut Gallery
- 1992 Solo Exhibition, “Summer”, Christa Faut Gallery
- 1990 Solo Exhibition, “This Place”, Christa Faut Gallery
- 1986 “North Carolina Artists” Invitational, Hickory Museum of Art, Hickory, NC
- 1981 Solo Exhibition, Davidson College Art Gallery
- 1981 Solo Exhibition, Hodges Taylor Gallery, Charlotte, NC
- 1979 Springs Mills Open Exhibition, Traveling Show, Juror: Marcia Tucker, Spartanburg, SC

== Collections ==
- Cameron Art Museum, Wilmington, NC
- University of Virginia Cancer Center, Charlottesville, VA
- Weatherspoon Art Museum, University of North Carolina at Greensboro
- Mint Museum, Charlotte, NC
- Blowing Rock Art and History Museum, Blowing Rock, NC
- Hickory Museum of Art, Hickory, NC
- Her Excellency, Madame President Ellen Johnson Sirleaf, Liberia
- Kenan Center, University of North Carolina at Chapel Hill
- Davidson College, Davidson, NC
- Southern Living Magazine, Southern Progress Corporation, Birmingham, ALA
- Bank of America, Charlotte, NC
- Trammell Crow Company, Charlotte, NC
- Branch Banking and Trust, Charlotte, NC
- Electrolux, Concord, NC
- The Pines, Davidson, NC
- Fearrington Village Inn, Pittsboro, NC
- Central Carolina Bank, Durham, NC
- RIHT Mortgage, Charlotte, NC
- Brooks, Pierce, Raleigh, NC
- UNC Rex NC Heart and Vascular Hospital, Raleigh, NC
- NC State Bar, Raleigh, NC
- City of Raleigh, Raleigh, NC

== Honors, and awards ==
- 2017 ArtPop, class of 2018
- 2008 Telly Award, for “The Painted Journal”
- 2006 Featured Artist, North Carolina Women's Conference, Charlotte, NC
- 1996 Selected for US State Department Art in Embassies Program

== Residencies ==
- 2022 Virginia Center for Creative Arts, Amherst, VA
- 2017 Moulin à Nef, VCCA-France, Auvillar, France
- 2014 Skopart, The Skopelos Foundation for the Arts, Skopelos, Greece
- 2013 Virginia Center for Creative Arts, Amherst, VA
- 2011 School of the Art Institute, Teacher's Institute of Contemporary Art, Chicago, IL

== Publications ==
Three publications feature Bradford's work:

- 2006 The Painted Journal, Wachovia Corporation, OCLC 913748685
- 2016 Elizabeth Bradford: Time + Terrain, Blowing Rock Art & History Museum, ISBN 978-0692729007
- 2024 "Elizabeth Bradford: Warp Weft Water Weeds", Davidson College Art Galleries ISBN 978-1890573379
