= Fred Machetanz =

American painter

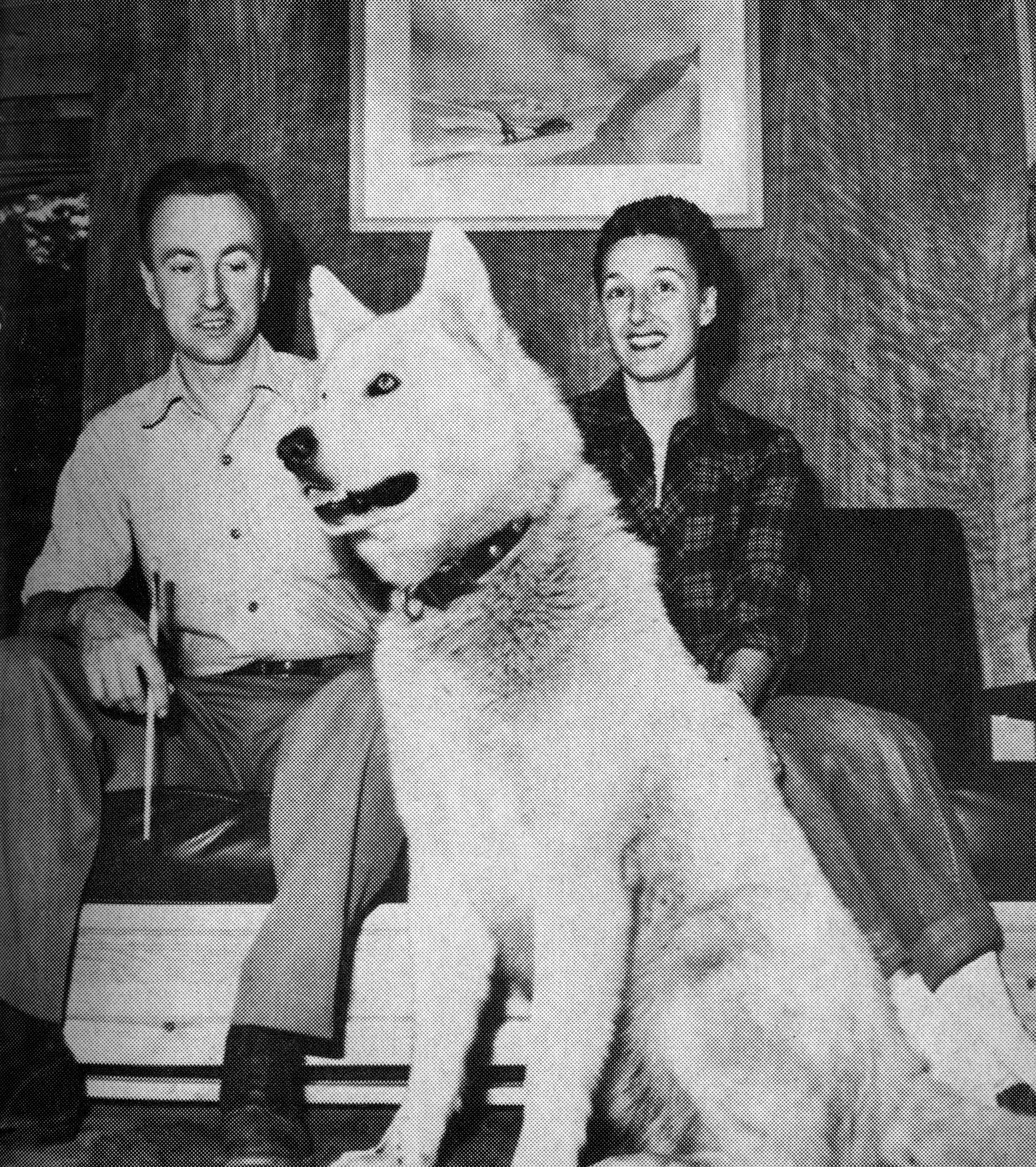
- Fred and Sara Machetanz at home with their dog Seegoo, a frequent subject of his paintings, in 1953.
- Born: Fred Machetanz; February 20, 1908; Kenton, Ohio, US
- Died: October 6, 2002 (aged 94); Palmer, Alaska, US
- Education: The Ohio State University, American Academy of Art in Chicago, Art Students League in New York
- Known for: Painting, Illustration, Author
- Notable work: "Panuck, Eskimo Sled Dog", "On Arctic Ice", "Barney Hits the Trail", Mary Lou Johnson – Hardin County District Library, The Anchorage Museum of History and Art, The Morris collection of Alaska art
- Movement: Impressionism, wildlife
- Spouse: Sara Dunn (1918–2001)

Fred Machetanz (February 20, 1908 – October 6, 2002) was an Alaskan painter and illustrator who specialized in depictions of Alaskan scenes, people and wildlife. He first came to the territory in 1935, when he traveled to Unalakleet to visit his uncle, Charles Traeger, who ran a trading post there and spent 2 years developing a portfolio of Alaskan scenes. After leaving Alaska, he spent some time as an illustrator in New York, but longed to return to Alaska. He returned in 1942 after volunteering with the U.S. Navy and requesting a posting to the Aleutian Islands during World War II. He rose to the rank of Lieutenant Commander and was responsible for intelligence for the North Pacific Command. After the war, he trained for a short time at the Art Students League in New York, studying lithography under Will Barnet, and then returned to Unalakleet in 1946.

Machetanz married Sara Dunn, a writer, in 1947, and the two settled near Palmer, Alaska in 1951. They published several books together and collaborated on films for Walt Disney, the Territory of Alaska, and Encyclopædia Britannica. They also made many promotional and lecture tours through the lower 48 states from 1948 through 1960. The turning point in Fred's painting career came on April 21, 1962, when Bob Atwood, editor and publisher of the Anchorage Times, arranged for a one-man show of his paintings. The works at the show sold quickly, and the success allowed Fred to pursue painting full-time.

== Style ==
Machetanz was a strong colorist. He most often painted on hardboard, which was prepared with layers of an ultramarine blue base using a large brush. He then applied a transparent oil glazing technique to build up layers from there, emphasizing areas of color and form. This gave his works a cool, luminous quality that he felt reflected the environment of the Arctic.

During his career, he produced fifty stone lithographs of scenes of Alaska.

== Honors ==
He was named Alaskan of the Year in 1977, and American Artist of the Year in 1981 by American Artist magazine. Machetanz was also awarded honorary doctorates by the University of Alaska and The Ohio State University. As a result of their philanthropic activities, several facilities are named for the Machetanz's including: the football field at Palmer High School, a building at Mat-Su College, a theatre in Wasilla, and Fred & Sara Machetanz Elementary School in Wasilla.

== Family ==
Fred and Sara had a son, Traeger, in 1959 who practices law in Washington and Alaska. Through Traeger, Fred and Sara are the grandparents of Alex (b. 1992) and Olivia (b. 1996.)

== Books ==
- Machetanz, Fred (1939). Panuck, Eskimo sled dog.
- Machetanz, Fred (1940). On Arctic Ice.
- Machetanz, Sara; Machetanz, Fred (1950). Barney hits the trail. New York, Scribner.
- Machetanz, Sara; Machetanz, Fred (1961). Seegoo: Dog of Alaska.
- Machetanz, Sara (1961). The Howl of the Malemute: The Story of An Alaskan Winter.
- Machetanz, Sara; Machetanz, Fred (1980). The Oil Paintings of Fred Machetanz.
- Machetanz, Fred (1977). The Alaskan paintings of Fred Machetanz.
- Woodward, Kesler (2004). A Northern Adventure: The Art of Fred Machetanz.
- Machetanz, Sara (1982). The 50 Stone Lithographs of Fred Machetanz.
