= Steph Post =

American author

Steph Post is an American author. Her books include the novels Lightwood, Walk in the Fire. and A Tree Born Crooked. She teaches writing in St. Petersburg, Florida. Author Brian Panowich said Post is the official voice of working class literature in Florida, akin to what Daniel Woodrell has done for Missouri, or Ron Rash for the Carolinas." An article in the Tampa Tribune described Lightwood as Florida noir.

Post was born in St. Augustine, Florida. She went to Davidson College in Davidson, North Carolina as a recipient of the Patricia Cornwell Scholarship for creative writing. At Davidson she won the Vereen Bell writing award for short fiction. Post lives in Tampa.

== Books ==
- Lightwood
- Walk in the Fire
- A Tree Born Crooked
