= Russ Warren =

American painter

- Born: December 29, 1951; Washington, D.C.
- Education: Neo-expressionism, American modernism
- Known for: Painting, printmaking
- Notable work: Texas Pride, The Temptation, Goodnight Little Cerberus, Mare: A Work in Progress
- Patrons: New Orleans Museum of Art, North Carolina Museum of Art

Russ Warren (born 1951) is an American figurative painter who has exhibited extensively throughout the U.S. and abroad, notably in the 1981 Whitney Biennial and the 1984 Venice Biennale. A painter in the neo-expressionist style, he has drawn inspiration from Spanish masters such as Velázquez, Goya and Picasso, as well as from Mexican folk art and the American southwest. Committed to his own Regionalist style during his formative years in Texas and New Mexico, he was picked up by Phyllis Kind in 1981. During those years he transitioned to a style characterized by "magical realism", and his work came to rely on symbol allegory, and unusual shifts in scale. Throughout his career, his paintings and prints have featured flat figures, jagged shadows, and semi-autobiographical content. His oil paintings layer paint, often incorporate collage, and usually contain either figures or horses juxtaposed in strange tableaux.

== Formative years (1969–1973) ==
Born in 1951 in Washington, D.C., Russ Warren began his studies under Earl Staley at the University of St. Thomas in Houston from 1969 to 1971 and finished his B.F.A. at the University of New Mexico in 1973. His earliest paintings reveal a dedicated study of the early Modernists, such as Cézanne, Kirchner, Matisse, and, especially, Picasso. Still Life with Hands (1971) displays an impressive mastery of these influences. The cutouts of the artist's own hands, placed centrally within and over newspaper clippings of the day points to an autobiographical component that will resurface periodically in his work. In 1981, Elizabeth Hess noticed this in her review of his first solo show in New York, calling the works "private autobiographical paintings that create a mystique of the self."

== Regionalism (1973–1979) ==
After graduating from the University of New Mexico in 1973, Warren moved into his own studio in Houston (1973-5) and worked again with his mentor at St. Thomas, Earl Staley, on an installation from the Beaumont Art Museum in which he created huge papier-mâché sculptures of Texas Longhorn, oilmen, businessmen, oversized Stuckey's ash trays in the shape of the state, and other Pop-like images.

In graduate school at the University of Texas, San Antonio (1975–77), he participated in a program designed as an equivalent to a Ph.D. for artists. He received his M.F.A. in 1977, after completing an in-depth thesis on Regionalism, beginning with the WPA works of the late 1920s and ‘30s, and continuing through the Chicago, California and Texas art movements of the ‘70s. His belief that an artist did not need to become "mainstream" to "make it" in New York seemed to be upheld when on separate occasions both Marcia Tucker, then director of the New Museum, and Tom Armstrong, then director of the Whitney Museum of American Art, gave him "Best in Show" awards. Their recognition led to his participation in the Whitney Biennial of 1981, gallery representation with Phyllis Kind, and inclusion in the 1984 Venice Biennale, among other important exhibitions.

== Funky figurative (1979–1990) ==
After moving from his native Texas to Florida and then to Davidson, North Carolina, Warren's Regionalism gave way to what he has dubbed "Funky Figurative," and others have called "mad cap surrealist" (Donald Kuspit), False Image, False Naiveté, New Image, New Wave, and Neo Expressionist art. His repeated trips to Mexico and Spain during these years heightened his interest in folk art and the Spanish masters Velázquez, Goya, and Picasso. His animals and figures, now stripped of all particulars, act and interact as in a strange "Magic Theatre" (Barry Schwabsky), taking part in what seem to be epic passion plays, often hovering in catastrophic spaces produced by his exaggerated use of shadow and perspective.

== Paso Finos and Picasso (1990–2000) ==
In 1990, while developing an art class on Picasso at Davidson College, Warren become obsessed with Paso Fino horses, and they began to populate his paintings. One of his most ambitious and successful series, Mare: A Work in Progress, consists of twenty oil paintings, each measuring 4’ x 7’ or 4’ x 8’. The huge pregnant mare in these works and the house or temple in works leading up to them become the vessel or metaphor for painting itself. Timeless themes of creation and destruction, light and dark, life and death, exist side by side with tongue-in-cheek references to high and low art, as in Elvis Ain’t No Cubist.

== Psychoanalytical portraits (2001–2007) ==
In 2001, Warren returned to basics and to his sketchbooks for a series he refers to as "Psychoanalytical Portraits". The earliest paintings—oil on panel, mostly in black and white, measuring 20" x 16"—are emblems of personal and/or universal angst, recalling the isolation and pain of Munch's Scream and our post-9/11 world. These "portraits" morph into concise analyses of human attitudes and conditions, from isolation and anxiety to union and joy and back again.

== Magic mountains (2008–2013) ==
When Warren retired from teaching at Davidson College and moved to Charlottesville, VA in 2008, he made a radical departure from the modest in size, jarring in impact, black and white "psychoanalytical portraits" of previous years, paintings that Picasso scholar Lydia Gasman referred to as "brilliant distillations of Picasso," to return to riotous color and large scale. His most recent paintings the artist dubs "humorous nightmares," and they do recall some of his earlier work that Donald Kuspit referred to as "madcap surrealist" in style. For these works he draws freely from his own styles and subjects throughout his 40-year career as well as from some of his favorite artists such as Picasso and Juan Gris. For example, he has painted his own personal version of Picasso's Three Musicians, as well as large still life paintings that reference Juan Gris, in addition to paintings which are reminiscent of some of his earlier work which allude to the magic mountains or magoté (in Zapatec) he encountered while on a sabbatical in Oaxaca, Mexico. The mountains that recur in these paintings, whether as the main subject, a vista through a window, or painting within a painting in a still life, also undoubtedly mirror some of the mountains and views around Charlottesville.

== Livestock marker paintings and sculpture (2014–present) ==
After receiving a gift of livestock markers in bright shiny colors from a student, Warren was captivated by the fat crayons that are used to mark cattle and how many varied colors it came in. He started experimenting with using them on paper, and continued for several years making paintings of what he dubs "Combines" (faces with multiple profiles and frotal views in one), humorous animals, wildflowers, and most emphatically, a series of over 100 bulls he began in 2016.

He also returned to sculpture in 2016 after seeing the momentous exhibition at MOMA of Picasso's Sculpture], creating a series of animals and figures in painted plaster and found objects.

== Selected catalogues ==
- Southeast Texas Collective, Beaumont Museum of Art, Beaumont TX, 1975
- 1975 Artists Biennial, by NOMA and Jane Livingston, 1975
- 1975 Artists Biennial Winners Exhibition, New Orleans Museum of Art, 1975
- Rutgers National Drawing ’79, by Virginia Stell and Rutgers University, 1980
- 1980 New Orleans Triennial, by Marcia Tucker and the NOMA, 1980
- 1981 Biennial Exhibition, Whitney Museum of American Art, New York NY, 1981
- Contemporary Drawing, University of California at Santa Barbara, 1981
- Figures, Forms, and Expressions, Albright-Knox Gallery, New York NY, 1982
- Agitated Figures, New Emotionalism, Hallways Gallery, New York NY, 1982
- Painting and Sculpture Today: 1982, Indianapolis Museum of Art, 1982
- Southern Fictions, Contemporary Arts Museum, Houston TX, 1983
- Painting in the South, 1540 – 1980, by Donald Kuspit, Virginia Museum, Richmond VA, 1983
- Beast, P.S.I., New York NY, 1983
- Emblems of the Unseeable, by Carter Ratcliff, Knight Gallery, Charlotte NC, 1984
- 5th Annual Exhibition of North Carolina Sculpture, Research Triangle Park NC, 1986
- Prints From Glass, Western Carolina University, Cullowhee NC, 1986
- Luminous Impressions: Prints From Glass Plates, essay by Jane Kessler, Mint Museum of Art, Charlotte NC, 1987
- North Carolina Artists Exhibition 1987, with a conversation with Roberta Smith, Guest Curator, North Carolina Museum of Art, Raleigh NC, 1987
- The 41st Biennial Exhibition of Contemporary American Painting, by William S. Fagaly, The Corcoran Gallery of Art, 1989
- Equus II, curated by Sarah Sargent for the Arts Center in Orange, November–December 2005
- Russ Warren: Works, Exhibition catalogue with essays by Shaw Smith and Carter Ratcliff and Interview with the Artist by William Dooley, 2015
