= Frank Soos =

American short story writer (1950–2021)

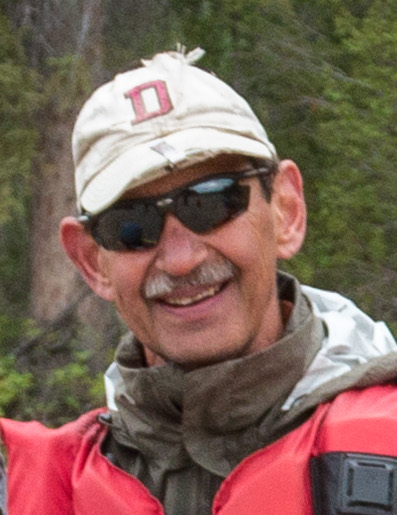
- Born: 1950
- Died: 2021 (aged 70–71)
- Occupation: Short story writer

Academic background
- Education: University of Alaska

Frank Soos (1950 – August 18, 2021) was an American short story writer.

== Life ==
Soos grew up in Pocahontas, Virginia. He graduated from Davidson College in 1972 and the University of Arkansas. He taught at University of Alaska Fairbanks.

His work appeared in North Dakota Quarterly and Quarterly West.

Soos died in a bicycle accident in Maine on August 18, 2021.

== Awards ==
- National Endowment for the Humanities Fellowship
- Flannery O'Connor Award for Short Fiction
- Alaska State Writer Laureate

== Works ==
- Unpleasantries. University of Washington Press, Seattle, WA. 2016 (essays.) ISBN 978-0-29599-840-4.
- Frank Soos; Margo Klass; Kesler Woodward (2009). Double Moon. Red Hen Press. ISBN 978-1-59709-141-1.
- Frank Soos (2006). Bamboo Fly Rod Suite: Reflections on Fishing and the Geography of Grace. Illustrator Kesler Woodward. University of Georgia Press. ISBN 978-0-8203-2835-5.
- Unified Field Theory. W. W. Norton & Company. 2000. ISBN 978-0-393-31988-0.
- Early yet: seven short stories and a novella. St. Andrews College Press. 1998. ISBN 978-1-879934-52-8.
- The other side of Christiansburg. University of Arkansas, Fayetteville. 1981.

=== Anthologies ===
- David Starkey, ed. (2007). "Hauling Water". Living blue in the red states. University of Nebraska Press. ISBN 978-0-8032-6008-5.
- Susan Fox Rogers, ed. (2002). "Upside Down with Borges and bob". Alaska Passages: 20 Voices from Above the 54th Parallel. Sasquatch Books. ISBN 978-1-57061-046-2.
