= William Winkenwerder Jr. =

American politician and health care executive

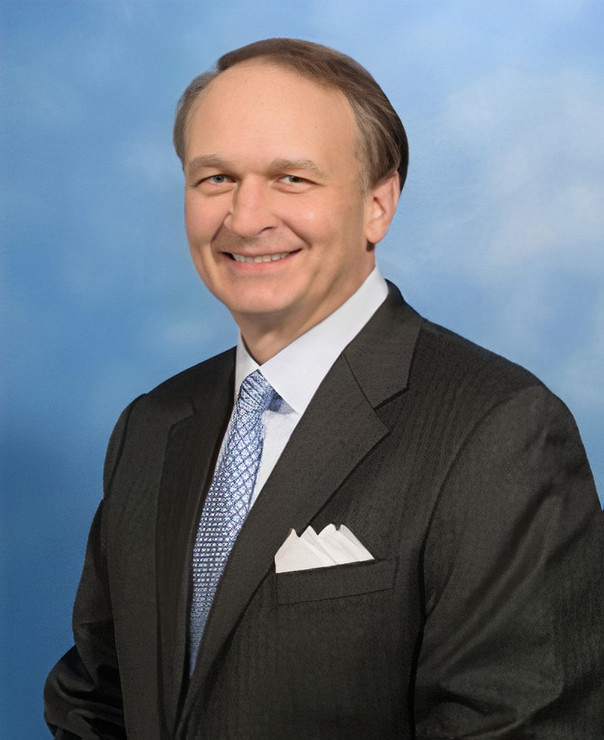
- Occupation: Healthcare executive
- Known for: Previously the United States Assistant Secretary of Defense for Health Affairs

William Winkenwerder Jr. is an American business and health care industry executive. He was Assistant Secretary of Defense for Health Affairs from 2001 to 2007. He had executive positions within the health industry.

He was CEO of Highmark. He is the chairman and CEO of Winkenwerder Strategies, and chairman of CitiusTech.

== Education ==
Winkenwerder graduated from Davidson College with a BS in Pre-Med in 1976 and The University of North Carolina Medical School in 1981. In 1986, he received his Master of Business Administration from The Wharton School of The University of Pennsylvania. Winkenwerder is board certified in internal medicine, and a fellow of The American College of Physicians.

== Career ==
=== Early career ===
Winkenwerder worked as a senior executive in the private healthcare industry. He was an early advocate of evidence-based medicine, prevention, and clinical practice guidelines. He was Vice President at Blue Cross Blue Shield of Massachusetts. AHIP asked him to join their board of directors.

=== Department of Defense ===
From October 2001 through April 2007, Winkenwerder was Assistant Secretary of Defense for Health Affairs in the United States Department of Defense. His senate confirmation was sponsored and presented to the US Senate Armed Services Committee by Senator Ted Kennedy of Massachusetts.

Winkenwerder was one of the officials who pursued a military anthrax vaccine immunization program and its potential expansion to include civilians. While in office, Winkenwerder also documented the U.S. military smallpox vaccination program through a study. Winkenwerder also organized a task force that worked on a plan to provide benefits for reserve and National Guard forces, which opened Tricare to non-mobilized reserve servicemen without employment or health insurance.

In 2005, Winkenwerder testified before Congress on the subject of military mental health.

Also in 2005, during his tenure at the Department of Defense, Winkenwerder issued an internal policy statement reiterating the importance of 'humane treatment of detainees' during interrogations at the Guantanamo Bay detention camp. The guidance specified that military medics charged with the medical care of detainees must be guided by medical ethics, make medically appropriate decisions and report inhumane treatment. It was later reported that military intelligence, which did not report to Winkenwerder, allowed some 'non treating' medical and science personnel to assist in the interrogations. Winkenwerder said that had resulted in a very small number of reports of patient abuse by military medics.

In 2007, he was also testified about conditions and renovations at the Walter Reed Medical Center and the National Naval Medical Center. During his tenure, the Walter Reed Medical Center, the Bethesda Naval Hospital, and several smaller military hospitals were consolidated into the National Naval Medical Center.

Winkenwerder launched AHLTA (Armed-forces Health Longitudinal Technology Application), which was the world’s largest electronic health record system at the time of its implementation, in order to transition the armed forces to using electronic health records.

He stepped down from his post in April 2007, following criticism of the Department of Defense's medical records system he had overseen.

Winkenwerder is an honorary chairman of the International Committee of Military Medicine.

=== Later career ===
In 2004, Winkenwerder received the Alumni Achievement Award from his alma mater, the Wharton School of Business, for his work with the Department of Defense. In 2005, he went on to receive the Dr. Nathan Davis Award from the American Medical Association.

In 2007, Winkenwerder was hired as a senior adviser by Deloitte. From 2007 to 2012, Winkenwerder was chairman of The Winkenwerder Company. In 2009, Johns Hopkins Medicine retained The Winkenwerder Company to help develop advanced health care services for government agencies.

From 2012 to 2014, he was CEO of Highmark. During his tenure, Highmark established the Allegheny Health Network after acquiring several hospitals in Western Pennsylvania, including Saint Vincent Hospital. In May 2014, Winkenwerder was removed from the position.

In late 2014, Winkenwerder established the private equity firm Winkenwerder Strategies.

He also sits on the board of directors of The Bob Woodruff Foundation. He is also a board member at Confluent Health, Accreon, and Cureatr, where he was vice chairman of the board. Since 2015, Winkenwerder has been a board director of CitiusTech Inc, becoming its chairman in 2017. He was an advisor to candidates in the US national elections of 2008 and 2012.

== Publications ==
Winkenwerder has published articles, interviews, and editorials in Health Affairs, New England Journal of Medicine, Journal of the American Medical Association, New York Times, The Washington Post, The Wall Street Journal, and USA Today. He has contributed to national news and media outlets including CNN, ABC, and Fox News.

== Recognition ==
Winkenwerder has been recognized for his professional achievements by:

- The American Medical Association (recipient of Nathan Business Award)
- The Wharton School of Business (recipient of Alumni Awards in 2004)
- Davidson College (recipient of Distinguished Alumni Award 2011)
- The United States Department of Defense (recipient of Department of Defense Medal for military medicine enhancements in 2006)
