= Mary T. Martin Sloop =

Medical missonary

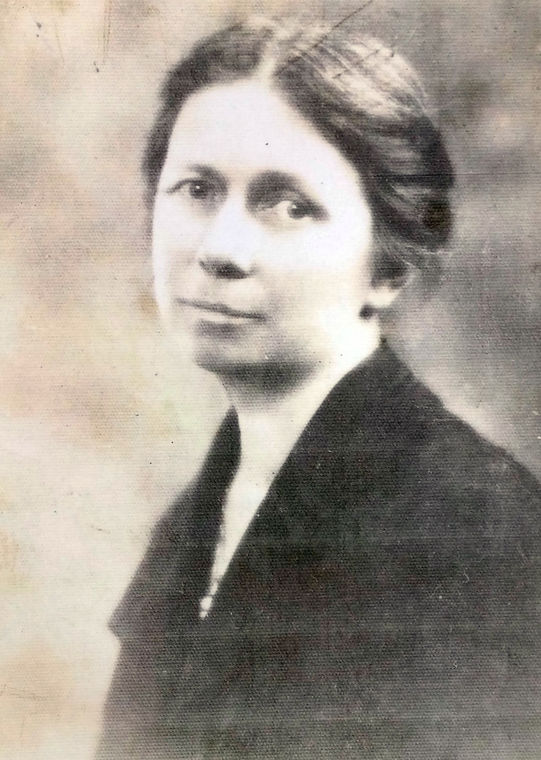
- Born: March 9, 1873; Davidson, North Carolina, US
- Died: January 13, 1962 (aged 88); Crossnore, North Carolina, US
- Spouse: Dr. Eustace H. Sloop
- Honours: America's Mother of the Year 1951

Mary T. Martin Sloop (March 9, 1873 – January 13, 1962) was instrumental to the improvement of healthcare and education in the mountains of North Carolina. She is most notable for founding, expanding, and developing the Crossnore School, serving as director until 1959. In 1953, Sloop published Miracle in the Hills, her autobiography detailing her lifelong efforts in medicine and education reform.

== Early life ==
Sloop was born in Davidson, North Carolina on March 9, 1873. She pursued her college education from both Statesville Female College and Davidson College. Although she sought to pursue a medical degree from North Carolina Medical Institute in Davidson, her gender barred her from studying anatomy there. She ended up receiving her degree from the Women’s Medical College of Pennsylvania at Philadelphia in 1906. Sloop had aspirations to complete missionary work outside of the United States, but served as a medical missionary in the mountains of North Carolina instead.

== Career ==
After graduating from the Women's Medical College of Pennsylvania at Philadelphia, Sloop took an internship at the New England Hospital for Women and Children in Boston in hopes of gaining medical experience. Later, she became a resident physician at Agnes Scott College in Atlanta.

Sloop founded the Crossnore School in 1913 with her husband, Dr. Eustace H. Sloop. At the time it was only a town church used four months out of the year. The teachers had little to no education or experience, and students did not attend regularly. Sloop was determined to provide the children in the mountains with a higher education. She started an organization that sold used clothes to fund the school. Over the next 40 years, Sloop would build the one-room schoolhouse into a complex of twenty buildings and over 250 acres, providing a nine-month, eleven-grade education. In 1924, the Daughters of the American Revolution pledged their support to the school, and four years later a hospital was added to the school. By 1939, the Crossnore School was taking in both orphaned and abandoned children. Sloop even changed state law, raising the required attendance age to 16.

Another major success of the Crossnore School was its weaving program, founded in 1920. The weaving program allowed women to weave rugs, coverlets, and other handicrafts that were either sold by the school or used in the women’s homes. Because of the success and growth of the program, Crossnore built a Weaving Room specifically for the crafts program, which was funded by clothes Sloop sold, the Daughters of the American Revolution, and other educational associations and acts. By the fall of 1924, the school’s statistics determined that 38 students wove at school looms and 11 women wove at looms in their households. The program had an overall positive impact on both the community and on middle-class women, raising the morale of these women and bettering the moral status of the community.

== Accomplishments ==
Published in 1953 by McGraw-Hill Publishers, Miracle in the Hills is the autobiography and personal memoir of Sloop. It was written in conjunction with Legette Blythe and recounts the forty years Sloop and her husband spent fighting for the betterment of the mountain children in Crossnore, North Carolina.

== Later life and death ==
In her later life, Sloop entrusted the care over the Crossnore School with her son, daughter, and son-in-law. Sloop served as director of the Crossnore School until 1959, and died soon after in 1962 at the age of 88.

== Awards ==
In 1951, Sloop was named America’s Mother of the Year.

US Highway 221 in North Carolina is named after her in honor of her efforts, the Dr. Mary Martin Sloop Highway.

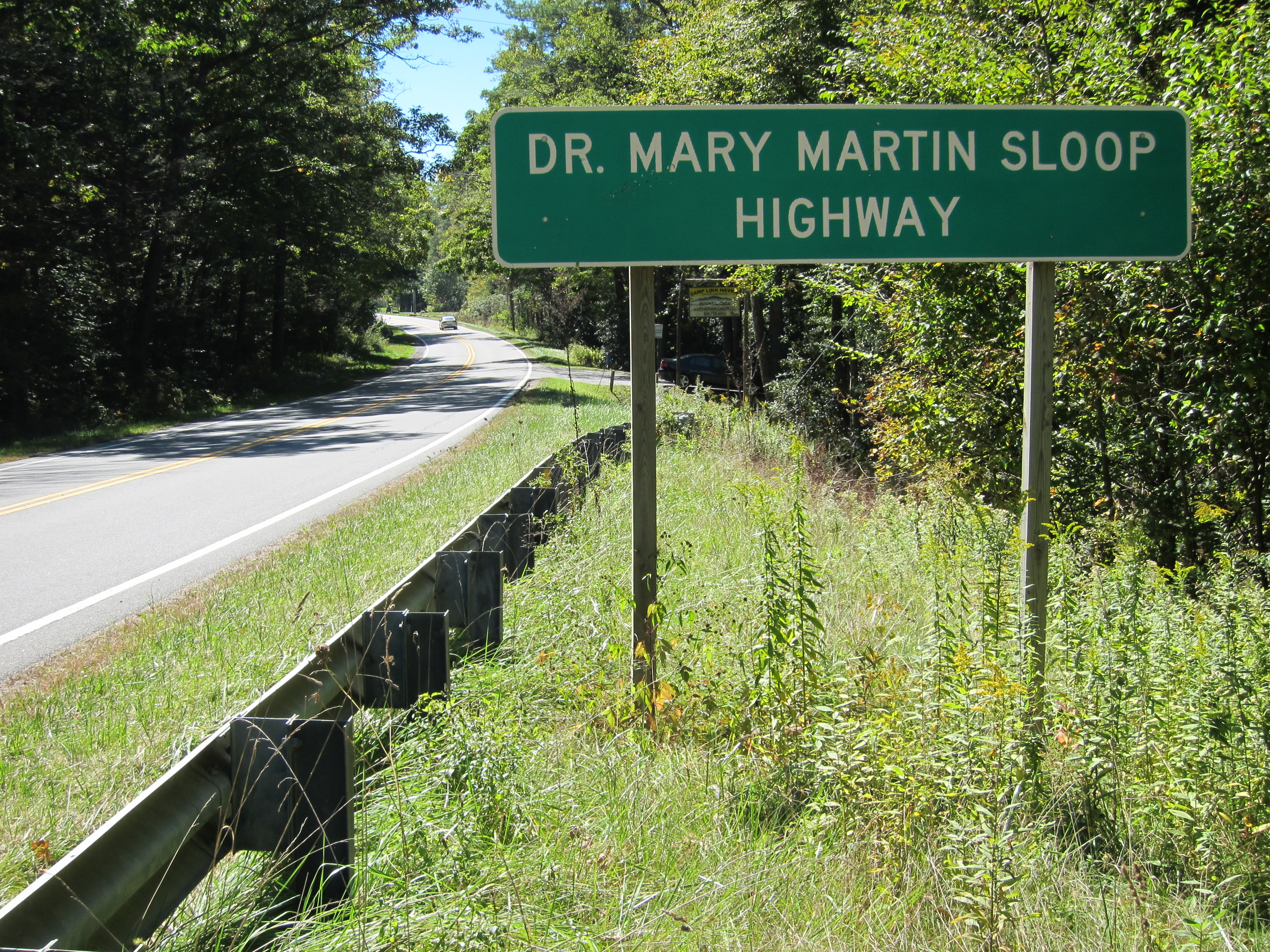
Dr. Mary Martin Sloop Highway (US Highway 221, North Carolina)
