= Earl J. Hesterberg =

Businessman

Earl J. Hesterberg (born 1953) is a businessman in the automotive industry.

== Education ==
Hesterberg received his BA in Psychology at Davidson College in 1975 and his MBA from Xavier University.

== Career ==
In 1982, Hesterberg joined Nissan. In 1991, Hesterberg was promoted from general sales manager of Nissan's American sales and marketing operation to vice president and general manager of the company.

In 2005, Hesterberg became chief executive officer and president of Group 1 Automotive Inc. In 2010, he became a director and chairman of the Compensation Committee of Stage Stores Inc. He has also served on the board of trustees at Davidson College and the board of directors at the Greater Houston Partnership.

Hesterberg's total compensation for 2013 was: $4,509,740.

== Personal information ==
Earl Hesterberg was born in Cincinnati, Ohio. He married his high school sweetheart and they have three children.
