= Wilson Gaines Richardson =

Wilson Richardson
- Born: Wilson Gaines Richardson; December 9, 1825; Maysville, Kentucky
- Died: July 5, 1886 (aged 60)
- Resting place: Stanton Cemetery; Stanton, Tennessee
- Education: University of Alabama; Hiram College
- Occupations: American Classicist, Minister
- Employer(s): Professor at University of Mississippi, Oakland College, Central University, Davidson College and Austin College
- Spouses: Louisa Vinson; Anne Herring
- Military career
- Allegiance: Confederate States
- Branch: Confederate States Army; Confederate States Navy
- Service years: 1862-1865
- Rank: Private (CSA); Paymaster (CSN)
- Units: 11th Mississippi Infantry; CSS Alert; CSS Selma
- Conflicts: American Civil War

Wilson Gaines Richardson (born Maysville, Kentucky, December 9, 1825; died Staunton, Tennessee, July 5, 1886) was an American Classicist, minister, and veteran of the Civil War. Richardson was the son of Thomas Gaines and Sarah (née Perry) Richardson and the grandson of Richard and Sarah (née Gaines) Richardson and of Captain John and Elizabeth (née Leathers) Perry of Woodford county, Kentucky.

== Education ==
He graduated from the University of Alabama with A.B. (1844) and A.M. (1847) degrees after which he served as a tutor in ancient languages at the university. He received his Ph.D. from Hiram College. From 1854 to 1859 Gaines was professor of Latin and French at the University of Mississippi in Oxford and then at Oakland College from 1859–1862.

== Military service ==
With the outbreak of the Civil War, Gaines enlisted as a private in the Lamar Rifles; he was wounded in action at the Battle of Gaines's Mill. Afterwards Gaines Richardson became a paymaster in the Confederate States Navy, serving aboard the CSS Selma (1856) and CSS Alert and was subsequently taken prisoner following the Battle of Mobile Bay on August 5, 1864. Gaines was exchanged March 4, 1865 at Ship Island, Mississippi, surrendered at Citronelle May 4, 1865 and paroled May 18, 1865 at Grenada, Mississippi.

== Career after the war ==
After the war Gaines Richardson was professor of ancient languages and French at Davidson College in Davidson, North Carolina; professor of Latin and French at Central University, Kentucky (1874–1878), and professor of languages at Austin College, Texas (1878–1881). From 1882 to 1884 he attended Princeton Theological Seminary and served as a pastor at Staunton, Tennessee (1884–1886). Hiram College conferred an honorary Ph.D. in 1876.

== Personal life ==
Wilson Gaines Richardson was twice married: he wed Louisa Vinson, daughter of Dr. Robert Lewis and Martha (née Bush) Kennon of Jackson, Miss., on February 4, 1857, and following her death, Mrs. Anne Herring on February 10, 1876.
