= Herbert Spaugh =

Walter Herbert Spaugh (30 September 1896–22 November 1978) was a U.S. Bishop of the Moravian Church. By the 1960s he was one of the most prominent clergymen in North Carolina, as well as in the Southern Province of the Moravian Church.

Spaugh was born in Salem (now Winston-Salem), North Carolina, the eldest of three sons of Rufus Armenius Spaugh (1865–1953) and Anna Louise (Hege) Spaugh (1872–1933). Spaugh graduated from Tinsley Military Institute in Winston-Salem in 1913, and from Moravian College in Bethlehem, Pennsylvania in 1916 (he had earned extra credits at Tinsley, enabling him to graduate from college in three years). He earned a Bachelor of Divinity degree from Moravian Theological Seminary in 1924, and a Master of Arts degree from Davidson College in 1931.

During World War I Spaugh served in the United States Army. He was stationed at Fort Jackson (South Carolina).

Spaugh married Ida Brown Efird (28 November 1893–10 December 1978) in Winston-Salem on 21 April 1920, his mother's forty-eighth birthday. Herbert and Ida had two sons and a daughter: Earle Frederick, Herbert Jr., and Carolyn.

In 1924, Spaugh became the first full-time minister of the Little Church on the Lane in Charlotte, North Carolina. He held that position for forty-two years. He was consecrated a Bishop of the Moravian Church on 27 December 1959 at Charlotte by Bishops John Kenneth Pfohl, Kenneth Gardiner Hamilton, and Carl John Helmich. He was a syndicated newspaper columnist whose work was carried in newspapers across the South. He also served as a trustee of Salem College and Moravian College, and was active in a number of ecumenical and civic organizations.

Spaugh died in Charlotte, North Carolina.

== Books ==
- The Pathway to Contentment (1945)
- Everyday Counsel for Everyday Living, The Dowd Press, Inc. (1951) (Online version)
- The Pathway to a Happy Marriage (1953)

== Sources ==
- The Boy, The Man, and the Bishop, by Barbara Harding
- Note (J. Murrey Atkins Library)
- History of the Moravian Church: The Renewed Unitas Fratrum, 1722-1957, by J. Taylor Hamilton and Kenneth G. Hamilton (Bethlehem, PA, and Winston-Salem, NC: Interprovincial Board of Christian Education, Moravian Church in America, 1967).
- Little Church on the Lane, Moravian Archives
