= Bart Creasman =

American soccer player

Personal information
- Full name: Bartley Creasman
- Date of birth: June 8, 1983 (age 43)
- Place of birth: Lake Mary, FL, United States
- Height: 6 ft 1 in (1.85 m)
- Position: Goalkeeper

Youth career
- Davidson Wildcats

Senior career*
Years	Team	Apps	(Gls)
2003	Richmond Kickers Future	4	(0)
2004	Raleigh CASL Elite	13	(0)
2004–2006	Wilmington Hammerheads	28	(0)
- * Club domestic league appearances and goals

Bartley "Bart" Creasman (born June 8, 1983, in Lake Mary, Florida, United States) is an American former professional soccer goalkeeper who last played for the USL Second Division club Wilmington Hammerheads. Creasman holds two goalkeeping records at his high school, with 258 saves during the 2001 season and 720 saves in total throughout his Lake Mary Soccer career between 1998 and 2001. He joined the Hammerheads in 2004 after playing in the USL Premier Development League with Richmond Kickers Future and Raleigh CASL Elite. He played his collegiate soccer at Davidson College.
