= Howard Dyer =

American politician

Member of the Mississippi State Senate from the 22nd district
- In office January 1976 – December 22, 1986

Member of the Mississippi House of Representatives from the Washington County district
- In office January 1940 – January 1944

Personal details
- Born: October 4, 1915 Greenville, Mississippi
- Died: December 22, 1986 (aged 71) Greenville, Mississippi
- Party: Democratic

Howard Dyer Jr. (October 4, 1915 - December 22, 1986) was an American lawyer and politician. He was a member of the Mississippi State Senate from 1976 to 1986 and a member of the Mississippi House of Representatives from 1940 to 1944.

== Biography ==
Howard Dyer Jr. was born on October 4, 1915, in Greenville, Mississippi. He graduated from Davidson College and the University of Mississippi School of Law. He represented Washington County in the Mississippi House of Representatives for one term from 1940 to 1944. He then represented the 22nd District in the Mississippi State Senate for 2 terms from 1976 to 1984, and was elected to a third term but died before it ended. While still a member of the Senate, he died on December 22, 1986, in his home in Greenville, Mississippi.
