= David Resnik =

American bioethicist (born 1962)

- Born: David Benjamin Resnik; November 30, 1962 (age 63)
- Education: Davidson College; University of North Carolina at Chapel Hill; Concord Law School
- Known for: Research on scientific misconduct
- Awards: Fellow of the American Association for the Advancement of Science (2017)
- Scientific career
- Fields: Bioethics; Philosophy of science
- Workplaces: University of Wyoming; East Carolina University; NIEHS
- Thesis: The methodology of biological science (1990)
- Doctoral advisor: William Lycan

David Benjamin Resnik (born November 30, 1962) is an American bioethicist who works at the National Institute of Environmental Health Sciences (NIEHS). He is known for his work on the nature of scientific misconduct.

== Education and career ==
Resnik earned his B.A. in philosophy from Davidson College, his M.A. and Ph.D. from the University of North Carolina at Chapel Hill, and his J.D. from Concord University School of Law. He taught at the University of Wyoming from 1990 to 1998, and directed the Center for the Advancement of Ethics there from 1995 to 1998. He then joined the Brody School of Medicine at East Carolina University (ECU) as associate professor of medical humanities and associate director of the Bioethics Center. He was promoted to full professor at ECU in 2002. In 2004, he left ECU to join the NIEHS.

Resnik was elected a fellow of the American Association for the Advancement of Science in 2017.

== Books ==
- Resnik, David B. (2004). Owning the genome: a moral analysis of DNA patenting. Albany: State University of New York Press. ISBN 978-0-7914-8594-1.
- Resnik, David B. (2005). The ethics of science: an introduction. Philosophical issues in science (Reprint. Digital printing ed.). London: Routledge. ISBN 978-0-415-16698-0.
- Resnik, David B. (2007). The price of truth: how money affects the norms of science. Practical and professional ethics. Oxford: Oxford University Press. ISBN 978-0-19-987128-5.
- Shamoo, Adil E.; Resnik, David B. (2009). Responsible conduct of research (2nd ed.). Oxford; New York: Oxford University Press. ISBN 978-0-19-536824-6.
- Resnik, David B. (2009). Playing Politics with Science: Balancing Scientific Independence and Government Oversight. Practical and Professional Ethics Series. Cary: Oxford University Press. ISBN 978-0-19-537589-3.
- Resnik, David B. (2012). Environmental Health Ethics. Cambridge University Press. ISBN 978-1-107-38004-2.
- Resnik, David B. (2020). Dying Declarations: Notes from a Hospice Volunteer. Routledge. doi:10.4324/9781003063841. ISBN 978-1-003-06384-1.
- Resnik, David B. (2021). Precautionary Reasoning in Environmental and Public Health Policy. The International Library of Bioethics. Vol. 86. Cham: Springer International Publishing. doi:10.1007/978-3-030-70791-0. ISBN 978-3-030-70790-3.
- Resnik, David B. (2024). The Ethics of Research with Human Subjects: Protecting People, Advancing Science, Promoting Trust. The International Library of Bioethics. Vol. 111. Cham: Springer Nature Switzerland. doi:10.1007/978-3-031-82757-0. ISBN 978-3-031-82756-3.
