= James Dalrymple McIver =

American politician

James Dalrymple McIver (14 December 1833 – 1 February 1912) was the son of Captain John and Margaret/Dalrymple/McIver. He married Mary Anne Kelly on December 2, 1862. He was a graduate of Davidson College in 1859. He volunteered 1st Confederate Co. in Moore County and rose to captain. McIver read law, served as county solicitor (prosecutor), and in the North Carolina House of Representatives (1876–1877); was solicitor for the 7th judicial district (1876–1886); and judge of superior court (1890–1898). Ruling elder at Carthage Presbyterian Church for many years.
