= Giorgio Rosso Cicogna =

Italian diplomat

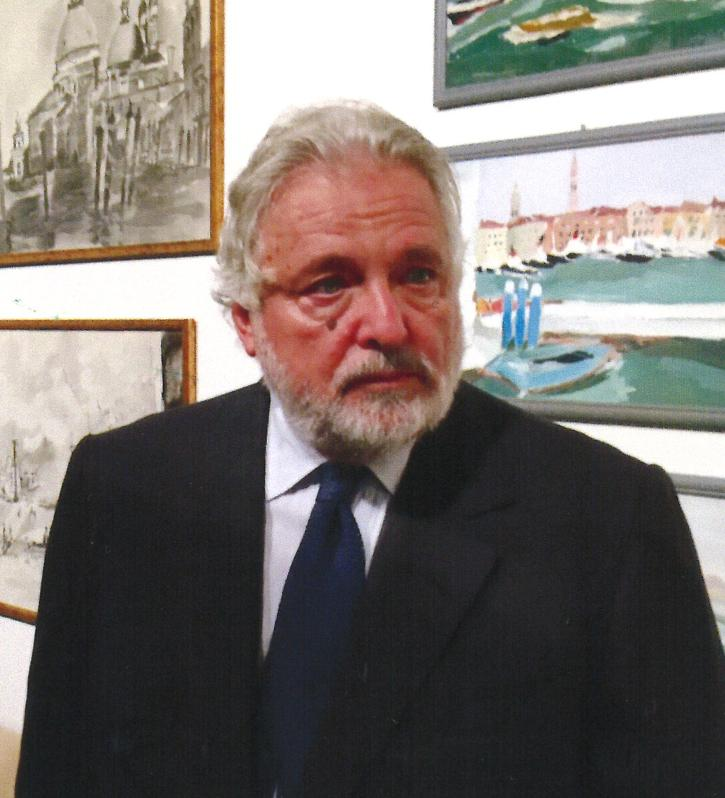

Giorgio Rosso Cicogna is an Italian diplomat and international official born in Trieste on May 7, 1945.

In 1971 Giorgio Rosso Cicogna joined the Italian Foreign Ministry for a diplomatic career of over twenty years. During his activity there he held the following positions: Assistant to the Diplomatic Advisor to the Prime Minister, Head of the Secretariat of the Foreign Minister and Advisor for International and European Affairs to the Ministers for Science/Technology and for Public Holdings, as well as several positions within the Economic Department of Italian Foreign Ministry. He also served as Consul in Vienna, Counsellor and Chargé d' Affairs in New Delhi and Alternate Head of the Italian Delegation to the CSCE.

After his retirement from government service, in 1991, Rosso Cicogna started a new career in the private sector as Director General of the Italian Federation of Industries for the Trieste region. In 1998 he joined TELIT (the only producer of cellular and satellite phones in Italy) as Executive Vice-president for corporate planning and for international, institutional and public affairs; being later consultant to the top management of several companies.

In 2008 he was appointed Managing Director of the International Centre for Science and High Technology (ICS) of the United Nations Industrial Development Organization (UNIDO). Since June 2010 until 2013 he served as Central European Initiative Alternate Secretary General. From 2013 until 2016 Rosso Cicogna acted as a Special Advisor to the CEI Secretary General. Currently, he holds the position of Senior Advisor to the Director-General of the International Centre for Genetic Engineering and Biotechnology.

== Education ==
He got a High School Diploma in classics (“Maturita Classica") in Trieste and completed the undergraduate studies at Davidson College (North Carolina, USA, 1964–65).

Bachelor/Master's Degree (“Laurea”) in Political Sciences was conferred to Rosso Cicogna by the University of Trieste in 1970. A Post-graduate degree at Johns Hopkins School of Advanced International Studies followed shortly (Bologna 1970–71.)

In 1971 he attended preparatory course sponsored by the Italian Foreign Ministry for the diplomatic service examination.

== Employment ==
Rosso Cicogna started his professional career, while still studying at the university, as a free-lance journalist for several newspapers and magazines (1968–1971). In 1971 he joined Italian diplomatic service, where he served for two decades. He acted within Foreign Ministry's Department of Economic Affairs - Office of Energy Resources and Technology (1971), Prime Minister's Office, as an Assistant to the Diplomatic Adviser to the Prime Minister (1972–1974), Foreign Minister's Cabinet, as the Head of Secretariat (1974–1975). In 1975 Rosso Cicogna was appointed as Consul of Italy in Vienna with accreditation to the Vienna-based International Organisations (as First Secretary in charge of personnel affairs). From 1979 till 1984, he served as Counsellor, then Chargé d'Affaires, at the Italian Embassy in New Delhi, India.

After returning to Italy and short activity within the Department of Economic Affairs, Middle East Desk of the Foreign Ministry (1984) he got an assignment as an Adviser for International and EEC Affairs to the Minister for Scientific Research and Technology and Head of the relevant Department (1985–1987). In this capacity the main tasks were: Italian Representative in the EEC Committee for Science and Technology (CREST), member of the Committee of Senior Officials of EUREKA, Italian Representative on the European Synchrotron Board, coordinator of the National Committee for Genetic Engineering and Biotechnology, coordinator of the National Committee for Advanced Physics Facilities, coordinator of the National Committee on Advanced Materials, co-ordinator for the Trieste Synchrotron Project, National Coordinator for the International Centre for Genetic Engineering and Biotechnology, representative of the Italian Government to the International Centre for Theoretical Physics (IAEA/UNESCO). His activity was instrumental in establishing Trieste- based international S&T organizations.

Being Adviser for International and EEC Affairs to the Minister for Public Holdings (1987–1988), he was Italian delegate to the EEC Committee of Directors-General for Industry, Italian Representative to the EEC Group on Iron and Steel, negotiator for Italy with the EEC Commission on the restructuring of the steel public sector and on public aid relevant to Italian public holdings and their subsidiary companies

In 1988, Rosso Cicogna was seconded to UNIDO as Director of the project "International Centre for Science and High Technology" (ICS) based in Trieste — aimed at the establishment of three institutes in the field of Chemistry, Environmental Sciences, Advanced Materials and High Technology; position held with the rank of UN Assistant Secretary-General (1988–1990).

From 1990 until 1991 - member of the Italian Delegation to the Preparatory Committee of the Paris Summit of the CSCE (Conference on Security and Co-operation in Europe).

Starting with 1991 until 1997, Rosso Cicogna acted as Director of Trieste Industrial Association (regional branch of Confindustria), which is responsible for external representation of over 240 companies with more than 16,000 employees. The position entailed, inter alia, overall responsibility for labour relations and related personnel matters (including negotiation and implementation of work contracts) for all associated companies, promotion of recruitment and training for their employees as well as interaction with private institutions (banks and others) and public authorities regarding financial instruments and incentives to industry. Other direct responsibilities included communication, public affairs and institutional relations with government at all levels.

In 1998 he became Executive Vice-President of Telit Mobile Terminals. The assignment included the following responsibilities at corporate level, reporting directly to the CEO: corporate planning, including investment fund raising in conjunction with industrial incentives; public relations (including institutional affairs for all companies belonging to the Group), communication and press as well as supervision of the Group's overall image; international affairs, including all contacts with foreign Governments and the European Union, as well as with major Telecom players on the international market.

As a Senior Consultant (2000–2003) Rosso Cicogna had similar assignments as above with the Mekfin/Finmek Group, which acquired the Telit Group, thus becoming the second producer in Europe in the field of Electronic Contract Manufacturing.

During the period 2000–2008 he was Senior Consultant with industrial companies and International Organisations, as well as Senior Adviser to the Director General of ICGEB (1992–2008), to the Managing Director of ICS (2005) and to the United Nations Conference on Trade and Development (UNCTAD) on the project aiming at the establishment of a UN Network of Centres of Scientific Excellence (2006); Senior Adviser to the President/CEO of Motorola Italy on a major project involving Finmeccanica and the Italian Government (2003–2007) and to the top management of Ausglobe Formula, an engineering company and general contractor for commercial building projects (2004–2007).

In 2008 he was appointed as Managing Director of the International Centre for Science and High Technology of UNIDO at the rank of an Assistant Secretary General of the UN (June 2008 to 31 December 2009). Mission: capacity building, dissemination of scientific knowledge, technology transfer, support to decision makers, as a contribution to the overall development of developing countries and of countries in economic transition. There were to priorities for the organization: eco-friendly renewable energy (next generation biofuels and geothermal) and innovative drug design and diagnostics (rational drug design, nano-drug-delivery, and nano-diagnostics).

From July 2010 to June 2013 Rosso Cicogna acted as Alternate Secretary General of the Central European Initiative (an Intergovernmental Organization based in Trieste with 18 Member Countries), and, afterward as Special Advisor to the new Secretary General of the said organization. In this position, he actively promoted S&T collaboration between the Member Countries, as well joint activities in critical fields such as biofuels, flood management, climate change a.a.

In 2016 he joined International Centre for Genetic Engineering and Biotechnology as Senior Adviser of the Director General.

== Personal life ==
Rosso Cicogna is married with Caroll Rosso Cicogna, an artist and book author.
