= CitiusTech =

Indian health technology company

- Type: Private
- Industry: Health information, healthcare, technology
- Founded: 2005
- Founder: Rizwan Koita; Jagdish Moorjani; Bimal R. Naik
- Headquarters: Mumbai, Maharashtra, India
- Area served: Worldwide
- Key people: Rajan Kohli (CEO), William Winkenwerder (Chairman)
- Website: www.citiustech.com

CitiusTech is a global health information technology company based in Mumbai, India. The company provides services such as data management, consulting, digital engineering, and artificial intelligence to health and healthcare companies.

== History ==
CitiusTech was founded by Rizwan Koita, Jagdish Moorjani, and Bimal R. Naik in 2005. All three founders met as students at IIT Bombay. Koita and Moorjani previously founded the BPO company TransWorks in 1999, which the Aditya Birla Group acquired in 2003.

CitiusTech received Red Herring's Technology Award in 2011.

For his work with CitiusTech, Koita received the 2013 Ernst & Young Entrepreneur of the Year Award.

In 2014, American growth equity firm General Atlantic purchased a 26% stake in CitiusTech. CitiusTech was featured in Forbes India as one of the publication's "Hidden Gems" in 2014.

CitiusTech established the Healthcare Innovation Fund with the Indian Institutes of Technology's Society for Innovation and Entrepreneurship in 2016.

Pat Fry, former president and CEO of Sutter Health, joined CitiusTech's board of directors in 2020. CitiusTech began supplying PICC lines to children being treated for cancer at Tata Memorial Hospital in 2018. CitiusTech also co-developed and deployed Sentara Healthcare's enterprise data platform through Microsoft Azure.

In 2019, General Atlantic exited CitiusTech, announcing plans to sell its stake in the company. Baring Private Equity Asia agreed to acquire CitiusTech from Koita and Moorjani in 2019.

In 2020, CitiusTech partnered with Google Cloud and began using Google Cloud Platform to provide IT and digital solutions for medical technology companies. The company acquired a majority stake in strategic consulting company FluidEdge Consulting in 2020.

CitiusTech acquired technology company SDLC Partners in 2021. Bhaskar Sambasivian was also appointed CEO of CitiusTech after the company's founders stepped down from their positions 2021. Atul Soneja was appointed the company's President of Operations in the same year.

Baring Private Equity Asia announced it was selling its 40% stake in CitiusTech in 2022, companies such as Bain Capital, Apax Partners, and Fujitsu expressed their interest, with Bain Capital considered the frontrunner in acquiring the stake.

Bain Capital, joined CitiusTech as a strategic partner in 2022. Birla Institute of Technology and Science (BITS) Pilani also began providing training for CitiusTech's technology professionals in 2022. In the same year, CitiusTech acquired salesforce consulting company Wilco Source and opened a new facility in Pune^{.} The company also has offices in Bengaluru.

== Awards ==
CitiusTech received the Golden Stevie Award for Most Innovative Tech Company at the American Business Awards in 2015.

CitiusTech has been named one of the best workplaces in India by Great Places to Work from 2012-2020. It was also named to Healthcare Informatics’ HCI 100 list from 2016-2018.
