= Davidson, North Carolina =

- Town
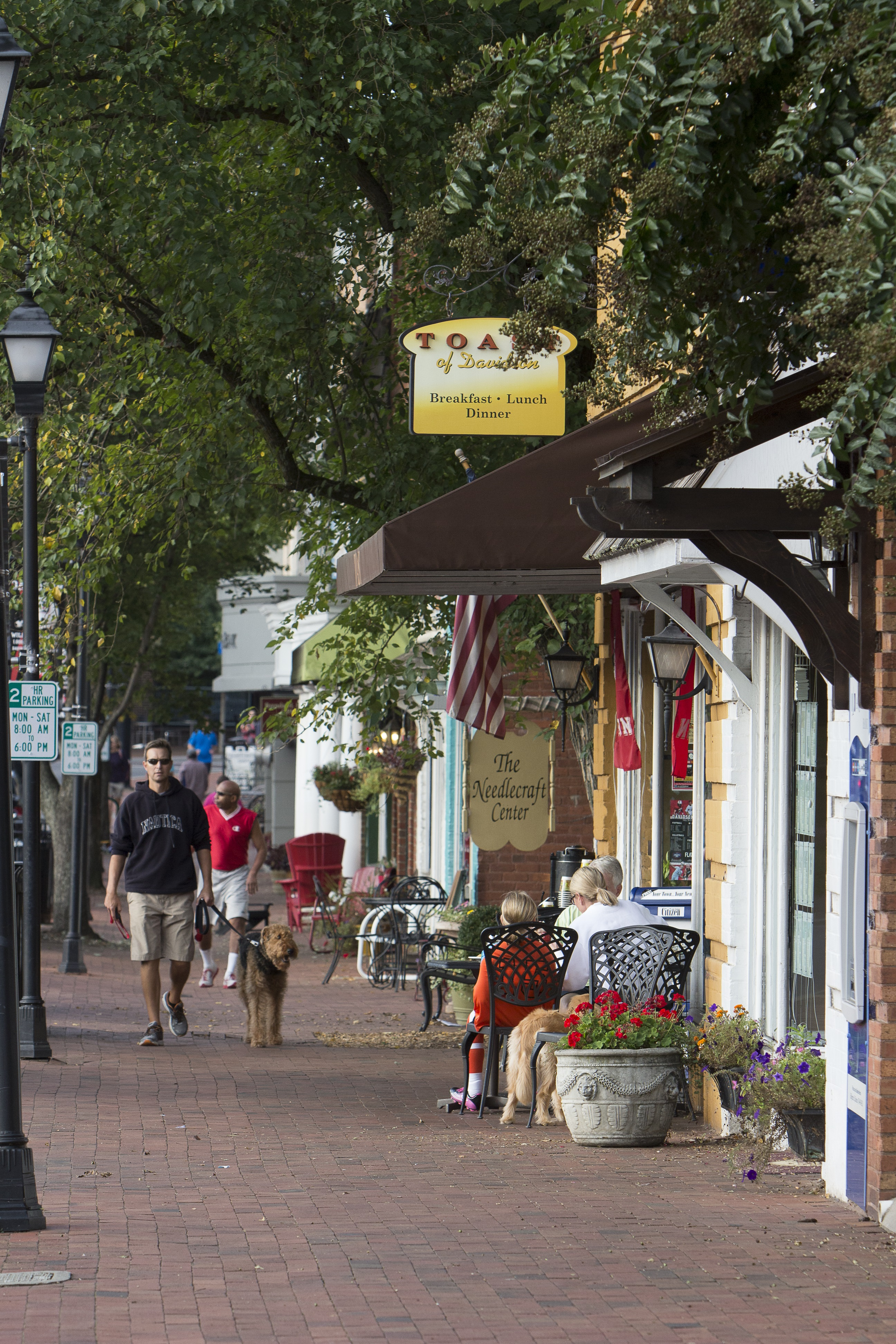
- Main Street

- Location in Mecklenburg County, and Mecklenburg County's location in North Carolina
- Coordinates: 35°30′02″N 80°50′49″W
- Country: United States
- State: North Carolina
- Counties: Mecklenburg, Iredell
- Founded: 1837
- Incorporated: 1879
- Named for: Davidson College

Area
  - Total: 6.75 sq mi (17.5 km^{2})
  - Land: 6.50 sq mi (16.8 km^{2})
  - Water: 0.25 sq mi (0.65 km^{2})
- Elevation: 833 ft (254 m)

Population (2020)
  - Total: 15,106
  - Density: 2,324.4/sq mi (897.5/km^{2})
- Time zone: UTC-5 (Eastern (EST))
  - Summer (DST): UTC-4 (EDT)
- ZIP Codes: 28035-28036
- Area code: 704 980
- FIPS code: 37-16400
- GNIS feature ID: 2406358
- Website: www.townofdavidson.org

Davidson is a suburban town in Mecklenburg and Iredell counties, North Carolina, United States. (Note: Town of Davidson Limits highlighted in orange near the top of the map) Some areas of neighboring Cabarrus County also use a Davidson postal address, but are not within the town limits. It is a suburb in the Charlotte metropolitan area. The population was 15,106 at the 2020 census, up from 10,944 in 2010. The town was founded in 1837 with the establishment of the Presbyterian Davidson College, named for Brigadier General William Lee Davidson, a local Revolutionary War hero. The land for Davidson College came from Davidson's estate, a large portion of which was donated by his son.

== History ==
John Davidson, described as "a prosperous Ulster merchant", was a member of the Davidson family who migrated south from Pennsylvania. Davidson's Creek was the westernmost settlement in North Carolina at the time, and according to Robert Ramsey's Carolina Cradle, it "became the nucleus of the Centre Presbyterian Congregation." John Davidson's son William went on to serve in the American Revolution, eventually becoming a major. Maj. William Davidson was a cousin of Col. William Davidson, the first state senator from Buncombe County, North Carolina, who in turn was a cousin of Gen. William Lee Davidson, for whom Davidson College was named. Gen. Davidson's son William Lee Davidson II sold 469 acres (1.90 km^{2}) to the Concord Presbytery to start Davidson College.

The history of the town of Davidson is inextricably linked to Davidson College, which predated the surrounding community and influenced its development. Although Davidson's growth in the late nineteenth and early twentieth centuries typified small railroad towns throughout the Piedmont, the presence of the college created a unique village. The tree-shaded campus filled with classically inspired architecture distinguished Davidson from other communities. The sway of the school also extended beyond the campus to the entire town, influencing commerce, culture, and the character of its architecture. The 1869 Branson's business directory recorded four dry goods merchants in the town as well as a cabinetmaker, a miller, and three physicians.

Soon after the arrival of the railroad, Davidson became a shipping point for cash crops, especially cotton, and a service center for farmers. In common with other railroad towns in the region, textile investors constructed cotton mills and mill villages along the rail corridor. The Linden Cotton Factory, erected in 1890 on Depot Street, was the first textile plant in Davidson, and in 1908, the Delburg Cotton Mills was constructed nearby. Two thousand bales of cotton were sold at Davidson annually in the early 1900s.

In 1891, the name of the town was changed from "Davidson College" to "Davidson", emblematic of the community's expanding roles for town and gown alike. Davidson's cotton mills spurred the growth of the town, and by 1910 the population of Davidson had reached 500 residents, climbing to 1,500 by the 1920s. Between 1900 and the Great Depression, the business district evolved from a commingling of stores and residences into contiguous rows of one- and two-story, brick commercial buildings. The heart of downtown – opposite the college – contained a full complement of small-town stores and services, including four general merchandise stores, a drug store, a laundry, tailor shop, two barber shops, a hardware store, a post office, a bank, and several restaurants. Physicians, building contractors, and milliners also had Main Street addresses. Behind Main Street along the railroad tracks stood the small 1897 Southern Railway Depot, a livery, flour mill, sawmill, cotton gins, a cottonseed oil company, a blacksmith shop, and a buggy manufacturer.

The demise of cotton farming and decline of other agricultural pursuits in the region effectively ended the town's role as a farming service center. Meanwhile, improved highways and the advent of I-77 encouraged residents to frequent larger department stores in the cities, especially Charlotte, 22 miles (35 km) to the south. In more recent years, the emergence of suburban shopping centers around Davidson accelerated the town's status to an all-purpose retail market.

Modern development around Charlotte has led to Davidson's growth to its current population of more than 15,000 people. Local downtown businesses cater this new market with restaurants and specialty shops.

Beginning with the General Plan in 1993, continuing through the Land Plan of 1995 and the Planning Ordinance of 2001, the town has advocated for and implemented smart growth principles, including pedestrian orientation (resulting in a ban on drive-thru's), mixed-use development, affordable housing, open space preservation, and connectivity. An emphasis on design has been a consistent theme in each resulting regulatory document. Additionally, the town of Davidson received National Register Historic District status in 2009 for the historic core of the town, which includes downtown.

== Geography ==
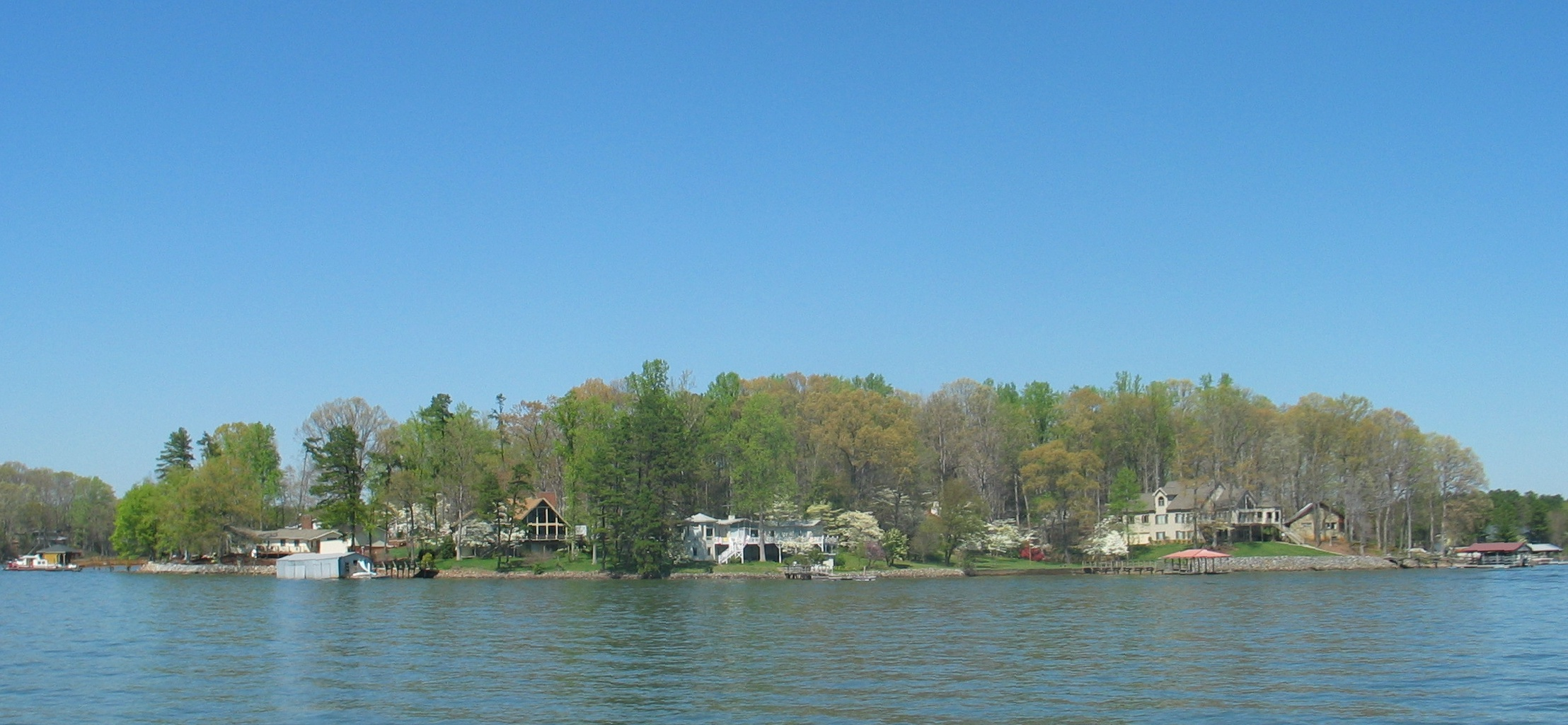
A view of Lake Norman in the spring

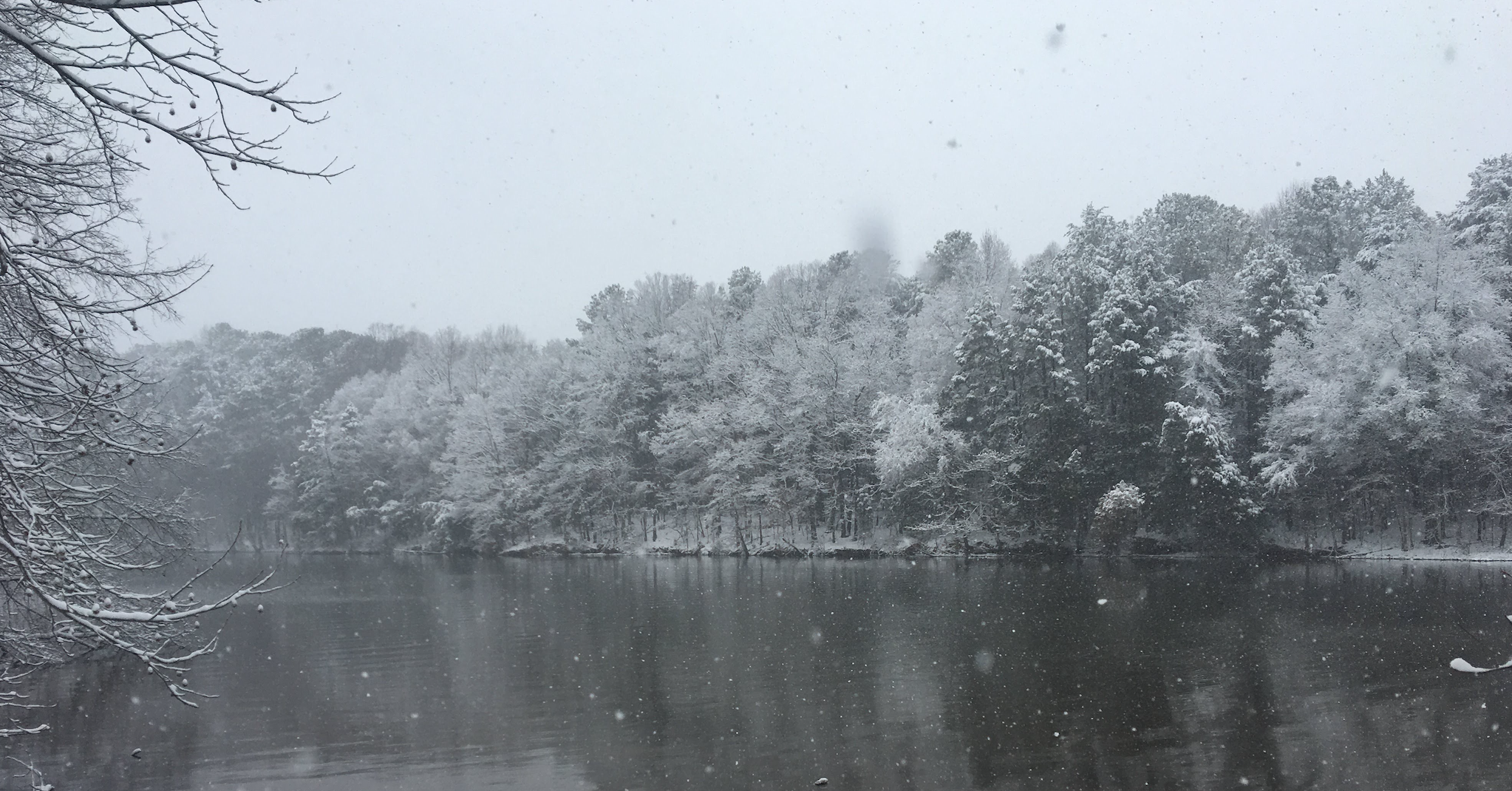
Lake Davidson, Winter 2018

Davidson is located in the Piedmont of North Carolina at 35°29′28″N 80°49′58″W, in northern Mecklenburg County, north of Charlotte. A portion of the town extends north into Iredell County. The western edge of the town follows the shoreline of Lake Norman, a large reservoir on the Catawba River. An arm of Lake Norman on the east side of Interstate 77 is known as Lake Davidson, with part of its shoreline within the Lake Davidson Nature Preserve. Davidson is bordered to the south by the town of Cornelius and at its farthest eastern edge by the city of Kannapolis in Cabarrus County.

Interstate 77 passes through the western side of Davidson, with access from Exit 30 (Griffith Street). I-77 leads south 21 miles (34 km) to Charlotte and north the same distance to Statesville. North Carolina Highway 115 is Davidson's Main Street; it leads north 7 miles (11 km) to Mooresville and south 6 miles (10 km) to Huntersville.

According to the U.S. Census Bureau, the town has a total area of 6.8 square miles (17.6 km^{2}), of which 6.5 square miles (16.8 km^{2}) are land and 0.3 square miles (0.8 km^{2}), or 3.73%, are water. While the area west of Main Street drains into Lake Norman, part of the Catawba River watershed, the majority of the town drains eastward via the South Prong of the West Branch of the Rocky River, a tributary of the Pee Dee River.

== Demographics ==
Historical population
Census	Pop.	Note	%±
1880	391		—
1890	481		23.0%
1900	904		87.9%
1910	1,056		16.8%
1920	1,156		9.5%
1930	1,445		25.0%
1940	1,550		7.3%
1950	2,423		56.3%
1960	2,573		6.2%
1970	2,931		13.9%
1980	3,241		10.6%
1990	4,046		24.8%
2000	7,139		76.4%
2010	10,944		53.3%
2020	15,106		38.0%
2025 (est.)	16,662	▲	10.3%
U.S. Decennial Census

=== Racial and ethnic composition ===
Davidson town, North Carolina – Racial and ethnic composition Note: the US Census treats Hispanic/Latino as an ethnic category. This table excludes Latinos from the racial categories and assigns them to a separate category. Hispanics/Latinos may be of any race.
Race / Ethnicity (NH = Non-Hispanic)	Pop 2000	Pop 2010	Pop 2020	% 2000	% 2010	% 2020
White alone (NH)	6,234	9,368	12,436	87.32%	85.60%	82.32%
Black or African American alone (NH)	579	679	746	8.11%	6.20%	4.94%
Native American or Alaska Native alone (NH)	11	19	25	0.15%	0.17%	0.17%
Asian alone (NH)	92	299	503	1.29%	2.73%	3.33%
Native Hawaiian or Pacific Islander alone (NH)	4	1	1	0.06%	0.01%	0.01%
Other race alone (NH)	6	16	61	0.08%	0.15%	0.40%
Mixed race or Multiracial (NH)	50	151	511	0.70%	1.38%	3.38%
Hispanic or Latino (any race)	163	411	823	2.28%	3.76%	5.45%
Total	7,139	10,944	15,106	100.00%	100.00%	100.00%

=== 2020 census ===
As of the 2020 census, Davidson had a population of 15,106 people, with 5,450 households and 3,011 families.

The median age was 39.5 years. 21.2% of residents were under the age of 18 and 16.5% were 65 years of age or older. For every 100 females, there were 88.4 males, and for every 100 females age 18 and over, there were 86.1 males age 18 and over.

Of the 5,450 households, 33.2% had children under the age of 18 living in them. Of all households, 57.0% were married-couple households, 13.4% had a male householder and no spouse or partner present, and 26.7% had a female householder and no spouse or partner present. About 28.5% of all households were made up of individuals and 13.6% had someone living alone who was 65 years of age or older.

There were 5,898 housing units, of which 7.6% were vacant. The homeowner vacancy rate was 2.1% and the rental vacancy rate was 4.4%.

99.9% of residents lived in urban areas, while 0.1% lived in rural areas.

=== 2010 census ===
According to the 2010 census, there were 10,944 people and 4,253 housing units in the town. The racial makeup of the town was 87.8% White, 6.4% African American, 0.2% Native American, 2.8% Asian, 3.8% Hispanic or Latino and 1.7% from two or more races.

There were approximately 2,429 family households, out of which 34.2% had children under the age of 18 living with them, 56.3% were married couples living together, 7.3% had a female householder with no husband present, 2.6% had a male householder with no wife present, and 33.8% were non-families. 26.4% of all households were made up of individuals, and 7.3% had someone living alone who was 65 years of age or older. The average household size was 2.4 and the average family size was 3.11.

In the town, the population was spread out, with 22.8% under the age of 18, 14.9% from 20 to 29, 21.9% from 35 to 49, 16.2% from 50 to 64, and 12.5% who were 65 years of age or older. The median age was 35.7 years. 47.5% of the population was male and 52.5% was female.

The median household income was $83,730, and the median income for a family was $124,045. Males who work full-time and year-round had a median income of $93,833 versus $56,178 for females. The per capita income for the town was $49,065. About 4.8% of families and 6.4% of the population were below the poverty line, including 6.5% of those under age 18 and 3.9% of those age 65 or over.

== Education ==
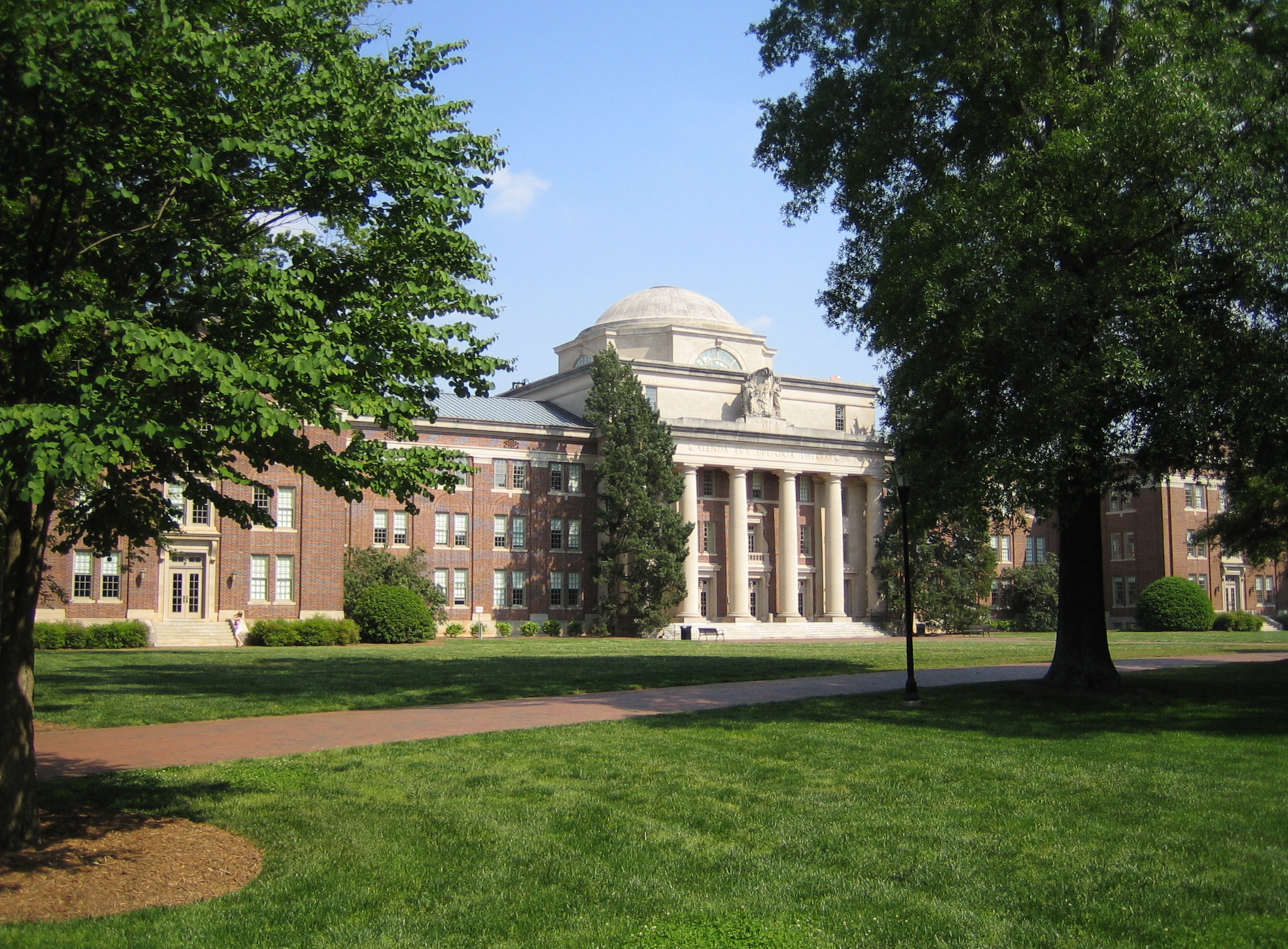
Chambers Building at Davidson College

=== K-12 schools ===
The residents of Davidson attend the Charlotte-Mecklenburg Schools. Davidson School is the zoned school for grades K-8. High school students attend William A. Hough High School in Cornelius.

Elementary schools include Davidson Elementary. Following the shutdown of Davidson IBMYP Middle School in 2011, students were re-assigned to J. M. Alexander Middle School. There was no middle school located in Davidson for nearly 10 years. However, beginning around 2019, Davidson Elementary has been expanded to Davidson K-8, although some students leave to attend magnet, charter, or private schools.

Private schools

- Davidson Day School, located at 750 Jetton Road in Davidson
- Davidson Green School, located in downtown Davidson, 511, South Main St

Charter schools

- Community School of Davidson

=== Colleges and universities ===
Davidson is home to Davidson College, a highly selective liberal arts college located in the heart of town on Main Street. Davidson College is ranked 15th in National Liberal Arts Colleges, and the top school in the South. It is consistently ranked in the top ten best liberal arts colleges in the country, and has graduated 23 Rhodes scholars. Some notable attendees of the college are Woodrow Wilson, the 28th President of the United States, George Osborne, former British Chancellor of the Exchequer, and current NBA player Stephen Curry.

=== Libraries ===
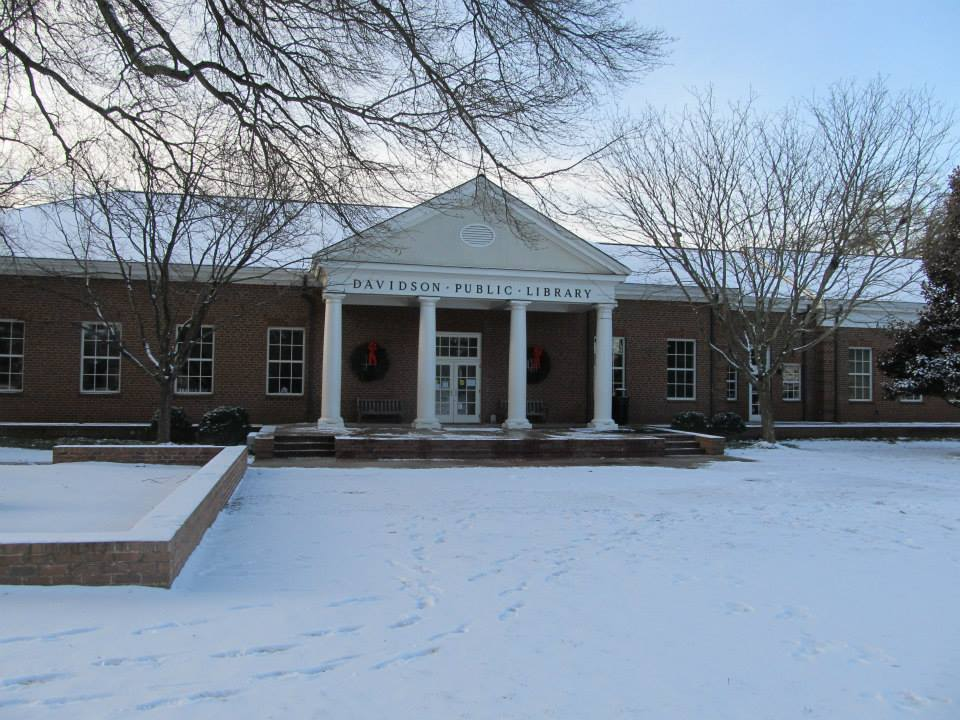
Davidson Public Library

Davidson is served by a branch of the Public Library of Charlotte and Mecklenburg County. The library is located on the Green in Davidson.

== Employers ==
=== Trane/Ingersoll Rand ===
Davidson is home to Ingersoll Rand US corporate headquarters. In 2020, the Beaty Street Corporate headquarters also became home to Trane, a recent subsidiary of Ingersoll Rand. The company has a five-building complex on one of Lake Davidson's peninsulas. Ingersoll Rand employs 1,600 people in Davidson.

=== MSC Industrial Direct ===
MSC Industrial Direct, located on Harbor Place Drive can be viewed from I-77 when traveling south. This building houses MSC's Customer Support Center/Corporate Headquarters. MSC Industrial Direct is Industrial Supplier, a Fortune 1000 company, and is on the NYSE under the ticker MSM company. MSC Industrial Direct employs 700 people in the Davidson Area.

=== Davidson College ===
Davidson College has also created many opportunities for the community employing over 500 residents. Davidson College also created the Hurt HUB. The Hurt HUB at Davidson College is a place for business professionals in the Davidson Area to meet young college students and create new networking opportunities.

=== Curtis-Wright Corporation ===
The corporate headquarters of Curtiss-Wright, an aerospace manufacturer, is located in Davidson.

== Points of interest ==
- Davidson College
- Davidson College Arboretum
- Lake Norman

== Awards and recognitions ==
- Fannie Mae Foundation Maxwell Award: to the Davidson Housing Coalition for the Bungalows (2001)
- North Carolina Housing Finance Agency Multi-Family Housing Award: for the Bungalows (2001)
- National Environmental Protection Agency Smart Growth Award for Overall Excellence in Town Planning and Design (2004)
- Exit 30 Master Plan - Marvin Collins Outstanding Planning Award for Smart Growth (2004)
- Centralina Council of Government Sustainable Environment for Quality of Life: Best Practices Award for Davidson's Aging in Place Task Force (2006)
- North Carolina League of Municipalities Green Challenge: Level One Award (2008)
- Recognition as a National Historic District (2009)
- North Carolina Main Street Community (2009)
- Tree City USA (2010)
- Bike Friendly Community - Bronze (2010)
- Davidson Police Department - Accreditation by Commission for Accreditation of Law Enforcement Agencies (CALEA) (2011)
- Comprehensive Plan - North Carolina American Planning Association (NCAPA) Planning Award - Honorable Mention (2011)
- Affordable Housing - NCAPA Planning Award (2011)
- Circles at 30 - NCAPA Planning Award (2011)
- Fit Community - Bronze (2011-2014)
- Walk Friendly Community - Bronze (2011)
- Great Main Street Award, North Carolina Chapter of the American Planning Association (2013)
- North Carolina Land Trust Government Conservation Partner of the Year Award (2014)

== Notable people ==
See also: List of notable Davidson College alumni

- Robert J. Abernethy, entrepreneur and philanthropist
- Matt Ballard, former college football head coach
- Elizabeth Bradford, artist
- John Candelaria, former Major League Baseball pitcher
- Steph Curry, NBA player
- William Lee Davidson, officer in the North Carolina militia and Continental Army during the American Revolutionary War; also namesake of the town
- Hayes Grier, Internet personality
- Nash Grier, Internet personality
- Will Grier, NFL quarterback
- Alan Gustafson, NASCAR crew chief
- Herb Jackson, professor of art at Davidson College
- Matt Kunitz, the creator of the hit reality tv show "Wipeout"
- Lenny McAllister, political commentator
- Gene McEver, American football player and coach
- Josef Newgarden, IndyCar driver
- Anna Chao Pai, geneticist and professor emerita at Montclair State University
- Thomas W. Ross, former president of Davidson College and current president of the University of North Carolina system
- Mary T. Martin Sloop, instrumental to the improvement of healthcare and education in the mountains of North Carolina
