= Herb Jackson =

American artist and educator (born 1945)

- Born: Walter Herbert Jackson, Jr. August 18, 1945; Raleigh, North Carolina, U.S.
- Education: Davidson College, Philipps University, University of North Carolina at Chapel Hill
- Known for: Painting, Drawing with Oil Crayons, Printmaking
- Movement: Abstract
- Spouse: Laura Grosch
- Awards: North Carolina Award (1999)

Herb Jackson (born August 18, 1945) is an American artist and educator. He is the Douglas Houchens Professor of Fine Arts and Professor of Art Emeritus at Davidson College, where he retired from teaching in 2011. In 1999, Jackson was awarded the North Carolina Award, the highest civilian honor in the state, by Governor Jim Hunt of North Carolina. In 2015 Jackson was awarded the North Caroliniana Society Award for extraordinary contributions to North Carolina's cultural heritage.

== Biography ==
Herb Jackson was born in Raleigh, North Carolina on August 18, 1945. Throughout his childhood he was a regular at the North Carolina Museum of Art in Raleigh and won his first award for art in a juried exhibition there in 1962, while a student at Needham B. Broughton High School.

He received his undergraduate degree in German from Davidson College in 1967 (art was not offered as a major yet) and studied abroad at Philipps University in Marburg, Germany for a year. Three years later he earned his master's degree in fine arts from the University of North Carolina at Chapel Hill in 1970. In 1969, while finishing up his graduate studies, Jackson began teaching at Davidson.

In 1982 he was awarded an endowed chair in art, a position which he held until he retired in 2011. Jackson has had more than 100 single-artist exhibitions in several countries, including England, Portugal, and Peru. Some of Jackson's work was chosen to be included in the first exhibition of contemporary American art to be presented in the former USSR. Jackson's work is now in more than 80 collections including the British Museum in London and the Brooklyn Museum in New York City.

He and his wife Laura Grosch live in Davidson, North Carolina, they have two sons.

== Art ==
Jackson's art is almost entirely abstract and non-representational. He is most known for his paintings, both larger works on canvas and smaller on board, and also for his oil crayon drawings on paper. He has also done a number of prints using vitreography and digital media.
