= National Register of Historic Places listings in Hardin County, Ohio =

Location of Hardin County in Ohio

This is a list of the National Register of Historic Places listings in Hardin County, Ohio.

It is intended to be a complete list of the properties and districts on the National Register of Historic Places in Hardin County, Ohio, United States. The locations of National Register properties and districts for which the latitude and longitude coordinates are included below, may be seen in a Google map.

There are 7 properties and districts listed on the National Register in the county.

This National Park Service list is complete through NPS recent listings posted December 12, 2025.

== Current listings ==
	Name on the Register	Image	Date listed	Location	City or town	Description
1	Ada Pennsylvania Station and Railroad Park	Ada Pennsylvania Station and Railroad Park	August 7, 1998 (#98001014)	112 E. Central Ave. 40°46′14″N 83°49′20″W	Ada	Former Pennsylvania Railroad station
2	Hardin County Courthouse	Hardin County Courthouse	March 21, 1979 (#79001863)	Courthouse Sq. 40°38′52″N 83°36′31″W	Kenton	Neoclassical 1913 courthouse
3	Kenton Courthouse Square Historic District	Kenton Courthouse Square Historic District	August 23, 1984 (#84003722)	Roughly Main, Detroit, Market, Columbus and Franklin Sts. 40°38′52″N 83°36′31″W	Kenton	
4	Kenton Public Library	Kenton Public Library	December 29, 1983 (#83004311)	121 N. Detroit St. 40°38′54″N 83°36′35″W	Kenton	A Carnegie library
5	Mount Victory Historic District	Mount Victory Historic District	April 19, 2001 (#01000390)	Main and Taylor Sts. 40°32′04″N 83°31′15″W	Mount Victory	
6	North Main-North Detroit Street Historic District	North Main-North Detroit Street Historic District	April 18, 1985 (#85000867)	Roughly Main St. bounded by Marie, Cherry, Carroll, and Detroit Sts. 40°39′06″N 83°36′28″W	Kenton	A residential neighborhood with several churches
7	Zimmerman Kame	Zimmerman Kame	July 30, 1974 (#74001523)	Off Township Road 39 northeast of Roundhead; 40°34′25″N 83°49′10″W	McDonald Township	Archaeological site associated with the Glacial Kame culture

== See also ==
- List of National Historic Landmarks in Ohio
- Listings in neighboring counties: Allen, Auglaize, Hancock, Logan, Marion, Union, Wyandot
- National Register of Historic Places listings in Ohio
