= List of Guggenheim Fellowships awarded in 1951 =

One hundred and fifty-four Guggenheim Fellowships were awarded in 1951. $568,000 was disbursed.

== 1951 U.S. and Canadian Fellows ==
Category	Field of Study	Fellow	Institutional association	Research topic	Notes	Ref
Creative Arts	Fiction	Charles E. Butler	West Virginia University	Writing		
Creative Arts	Fiction	John Cheever		Writing	Also won in 1960	
Creative Arts	Fiction	William Goyen		Writing	Also won in 1952	
Creative Arts	Fine Arts	Ross Abrams	College of William and Mary	Lithography		
Creative Arts	Fine Arts	Robert Noel Blair	Art Institute of Buffalo	Painting	Also won in 1946	
Creative Arts	Fine Arts	Adolf Dehn	School at the Norton Museum of Art (visiting)	Travels in Europe	Also won in 1939	
Creative Arts	Fine Arts	Joseph DeMartini		Painting		
Creative Arts	Fine Arts	John Edward Heliker	Columbia University	Painting		
Creative Arts	Fine Arts	Lewis Iselin		Sculpture		
Creative Arts	Fine Arts	Malcolm Haynie Myers	University of Minnesota	Graphic arts	Also won in 1951	
Creative Arts	Fine Arts	Arthur Osver		Painting	Also won in 1949	
Creative Arts	Fine Arts	Richard Pousette-Dart		Painting		
Creative Arts	Fine Arts	Steve Raffo	Cooper Union	Painting	Also won in 1950	
Creative Arts	Fine Arts	David Smith		Sculpture	Also won in 1950	
Creative Arts	Music Composition	Jacob Avshalomov	Columbia University	Composing		
Creative Arts	Music Composition	William Bergsma	Juilliard School of Music	Composing	Also won in 1946	
Creative Arts	Music Composition	Ingolf Dahl	University of Southern California	Composing	Also won in 1960	
Creative Arts	Music Composition	Roger John Goeb	Juilliard School of Music	Composing	Also won in 1950	
Creative Arts	Music Composition	Robert Kurka	City College of New York	Composing	Also won in 1952	
Creative Arts	Music Composition	Dai-keong Lee		Composing	Also won in 1945	
Creative Arts	Poetry	e. e. cummings		Writing	Also won in 1933	
Creative Arts	Poetry	Rosalie Moore		Writing	Also won in 1950	
Humanities	American Literature	Jay Leyda			Also won in 1950	
Humanities	Biography	Douglas Southall Freeman		George Washington		
Humanities	Biography	Horace Victor Gregory	Sarah Lawrence College	James McNeill Whistler		
Humanities	Biography	Elizabeth Stevenson	Atlanta Public Library	Henry Adams	Also won in 1958	
Humanities	Biography	George Woodcock		Pierre-Joseph Proudhon		
Humanities	British History	Conyers Read	University of Pennsylvania	William Cecil, Lord Burghley	Also won in 1954	
Humanities	Classics	Edmund Grindlay Berry	University of Manitoba	Influence of Plutarch on Ralph Waldo Emerson		
Humanities	Classics	William Kendrick Pritchett	University of California, Berkeley	Inscriptions from the marketplace of ancient Athens	Also won in 1955	
Humanities	Classics	Edward Anthony Robinson	Fordham University	Cicero's De Legibus		
Humanities	Classics	William Pitkin Wallace	University College, Toronto	Coinage of ancient Greek city-states	Also won in 1960	
Humanities	Classics	Constantine George Yavis	St. Louis University	Ancient Greek religious sacrifices		
Humanities	East Asian Studies	John K. Fairbank	Harvard University	Japanese historiography on China	Also won in 1959	
Humanities	Economic History	Robert Sabatino Lopez	Yale University	History of the guilds of southern European manufacturers of coins from the 4th to the 15th centuries	Also won in 1948	
Humanities	Education	Robert Benjamin Irwin	American Foundation for the Blind (retired)	History of work for the blind in the United States in the last 50 years		
Humanities	English Literature	Lily Bess Campbell	University of California, Los Angeles (retired)	Christian reaction to classical paganism in the renaissance in England		
Humanities	English Literature	James Lowry Clifford	Columbia University	Early life of Samuel Johnson	Also won in 1965	
Humanities	English Literature	Thomas Wellsted Copeland	University of Chicago	Edmund Burke's writings on the French Revolution	Also won in 1963	
Humanities	English Literature	Joyce Hemlow	McGill University	Writings of Fanny Burney	Also won in 1960 and 1966	
Humanities	English Literature	Cecil Yelverton Lang	Yale University	Letters of Algernon Charles Swinburne		
Humanities	English Literature	William Dougald MacMillan III	University of North Carolina, Chapel Hill	Dramatic works of John Dryden		
Humanities	English Literature	George Winchester Stone, Jr.	George Washington University	History of dramatic performances in London, 1660-1800	Also won in 1950 and 1963	
Humanities	Folklore and Popular Culture	Benjamin Botkin				
Humanities	French Literature	Alfred Adler	Central Michigan College	French vernacular literature in the Middle Ages		
Humanities	French Literature	Gilbert Chinard	Princeton University		Also won in 1956	
Humanities	French Literature	André Benjamin Delattre	University of Pennsylvania	Correspondence between Voltaire and the Tronchin brothers	Also won in 1941	
Humanities	French Literature	Herbert Dieckmann	Harvard University	Development and structure of Diderot's thought	Also won in 1948	
Humanities	French Literature	Claude André Vigée	Brandeis University	Critical study of Rainer Maria Rilke's posthumous poems and their translation into French		
Humanities	General Nonfiction	Joseph James Mathews	Emory University	History of newspaper foreign correspondents from the late 18th century to World War I		
Humanities	German and East European History	Jerome Blum	Princeton University	Origin, spread, decline, and final abolition of serfdom in central and eastern Europe	Also won in 1971	
Humanities	German and East European History	Leften Stavros Stavrianos	Northwestern University	History of the Balkan Peninsula		
Humanities	German and Scandinavian Literature	Heinrich Edmund Karl Henel	University of Wisconsin	Works of Conrad Ferdinand Meyer	Also won in 1954	
Humanities	German and Scandinavian Literature	Walter Friedrich Naumann	University of Wisconsin	Works of Franz Grillparzer	Also won in 1961	
Humanities	Iberian and Latin American History	Woodrow Borah	University of California, Berkeley	Socioeconomic study of the Mixteca Alta area of Mexico during the colonial period	Also won in 1958	
Humanities	Intellectual and Cultural Studies	Golo Mann	Scripps College	Limits between scientific investigation and speculative interpretation of history		
Humanities	Italian Literature	A. William Salomone	New York University	Italian social and economic history, 1550-1700		
Humanities	Linguistics	Norman E. Eliason	University of North Carolina, Chapel Hill	History of the English language in North Carolina		
Humanities	Linguistics	Albrecht Goetze	Yale University			
Humanities	Linguistics	Alo Raun	Pacific Lutheran College	Morphology and syntax of the Finno-Ugric languages		
Humanities	Literary Criticism	Philip Rahv	New York University and Partisan Review	Critical study of Dostoevsky		
Humanities	Literary Criticism	Ernest Lee Tuveson	University of California, Berkeley	Influence of progressivism on the literary imagination of Shelley		
Humanities	Literary Criticism	René Wellek	Yale University	History of literary criticism	Also won in 1952, 1956, and 1966	
Humanities	Medieval Literature	E. Talbot Donaldson	Yale University	Studies of the three versions of Piers Plowman	Also won in 1977	
Humanities	Medieval Literature	Walter J. Ong		English Renaissance literary history, particularly Peter Ramus	Also won in 1949	
Humanities	Music Research	Donald Jay Grout	Cornell University	Music of the early 16th century	Also won in 1952	
Humanities	Music Research	Leo Franz Schrade	Yale University	History of church music from the beginning of the Christian era to the 16th century	Also won in 1956	
Humanities	Music Research	Oliver Strunk	Princeton University	Music of the Byzantine liturgy	Also won in 1955	
Humanities	Music Research	Arnold Olaf Sungaard	Bennington College			
Humanities	Near Eastern Studies	Paul Julius Alexander	Hobart and William Smith Colleges	Byzantine history of the Middle Ages	Also won in 1965	
Humanities	Near Eastern Studies	Henri Frankfort	University of Chicago and University of London	Arts of the ancient Near East		
Humanities	Near Eastern Studies	Richard Nelson Frye	Harvard University	Middle Persian historical inscriptions and dialects of central Iran	Also won in 1975	
Humanities	Near Eastern Studies	Hal Lehrman		Internal problems of Israel	Also won in 1953	
Humanities	Philosophy	Richard Milton Martin	University of Pennsylvania	Semantics and logical systems		
Humanities	Philosophy	Rulon Seymour Wells, III	Yale University	Studies of meaning, with emphasis on natural languages		
Humanities	Religion	William Henry Paine Hatch	Episcopal Theological School (Emeritus)	Principal uncial manuscripts of the New Testmant	Also won in 1953	
Humanities	Russian History	Robert Francis Byrnes	Rutgers University	Antisemitism in France during the Dreyfus Affair		
Humanities	Spanish and Portuguese Literature	Ruth Lee Kennedy	Smith College	Changes in Spanish dress in the 17th century and of their significance in literary and artistic chronology		
Humanities	Spanish and Portuguese Literature	Luis Monguió	Mills College	Peruvian poetry between the two world wars		
Humanities	United States History	Arthur Cecil Bining	University of Pennsylvania	Comparative study of the growth of iron and steel industries of the US and Great Britain		
Humanities	United States History	Julian P. Boyd	Princeton University			
Humanities	United States History	Mildred Campbell	Vassar College	English emigration in the 17th and 18th centuries		
Humanities	United States History	Michael Kraus	City College of New York	Cultural cross currents between Europe and America in the 19th century		
Humanities	United States History	Dumas Malone	Columbia University	Thomas Jefferson	Also won in 1958	
Humanities	United States History	William Quentin Maxwell		United States Sanitary Commission in the Civil War		
Humanities	United States History	Edouard A. Stackpole	The Inquirer and Mirror	Discoveries and explorations of New England whaling men	Also won in 1963	
Humanities	United States History	Willard Mosher Wallace	Wesleyan University	Benedict Arnold		
Natural Sciences	Astronomy and Astrophysics	Su-Shu Huang	University of Chicago	Theory of broadening of spectral lines		
Natural Sciences	Chemistry	Harrison Brown	University of Chicago			
Natural Sciences	Chemistry	Alan Frank Clifford	Illinois Institute of Technology	Hydrogen fluoride solvent system	Also won in 1952	
Natural Sciences	Chemistry	Robert Brainard Corey	California Institute of Technology	Structure of proteins		
Natural Sciences	Chemistry	Farrington Daniels	University of Wisconsin	Solar energy utilization		
Natural Sciences	Chemistry	Harry George Drickamer	University of Illinois, Urbana-Champaign			
Natural Sciences	Chemistry	Albert Leon Henne	Ohio State University	Chemistry of organic fluorides		
Natural Sciences	Chemistry	Frederick Albert Matsen	University of Texas	Electronic spectra of aromatic molecules		
Natural Sciences	Chemistry	Walter John Moore	Catholic University of America	Structural inorganic chemistry of solids		
Natural Sciences	Chemistry	Ralph Pearson	Northwestern University	Rates of ionization of oxygen-hydrogen bonds		
Natural Sciences	Chemistry	R. Nelson Smith	Pomona College	Surface chemistry		
Natural Sciences	Chemistry	Harold R. Snyder	University of Illinois, Urbana-Champaign	Configuration of nitrogen in organic compounds	1939 fellowship postponed until 1951	
Natural Sciences	Chemistry	Carl Swenson Vestling	University of Illinois, Urbana-Champaign			
Natural Sciences	Earth Science	Bryan Patterson	Chicago Natural History Museum	South American tertiary fossil vertebrates	Also won in 1954	
Natural Sciences	Mathematics	Ralph Fox	Princeton University	Topology of three-dimensional manifolds		
Natural Sciences	Mathematics	Nathan Jacobson	Yale University	Abstract algebra		
Natural Sciences	Mathematics	Irving Ezra Segal	University of Chicago	Mathematical aspects of quantum mechanics	Also won in 1946 and 1967	
Natural Sciences	Mathematics	Max Shiffman	Stanford University	Topology and differential geometry		
Natural Sciences	Medicine and Health	George Edward Burch	Tulane University Medical School			
Natural Sciences	Medicine and Health	Joseph Wiley Ferrebee	Mary Imogene Bassett Hospital	Reactions between immune globulins and vascular tissues		
Natural Sciences	Medicine and Health	Richard W. Lippman	Cedars of Lebanon Hospital	Renal function	Also won in 1950	
Natural Sciences	Medicine and Health	Shih-Chun Wang	Columbia University Medical School	Physiology of the autonomic nervous system		
Natural Sciences	Molecular and Cellular Biology	Howard Alan Bern	University of California, Berkeley	Hormone-enzyme relationships		
Natural Sciences	Molecular and Cellular Biology	Frederick A. Fuhrman	Stanford University	Metabolic processes involved in active ion transport in animal tissues		
Natural Sciences	Molecular and Cellular Biology	Ruth Hoffmann Hubbard	Harvard University	Biochemistry of human vision		
Natural Sciences	Molecular and Cellular Biology	Walter Lee Hughes	Harvard University	Some specific groupings of purified proteins		
Natural Sciences	Molecular and Cellular Biology	Edna B. Kearney	Case Western Reserve University	Intermediary metabolism of microorganisms	Collaboration with Thomas Peter Singer	
Natural Sciences	Molecular and Cellular Biology	Albert L. Lehninger	University of Chicago	Mechanisms of enzymatic phosphorylations	Also won in 1962	
Natural Sciences	Molecular and Cellular Biology	Douglas Alfred Marsland	New York University	Mechanism of cell division	Also won in 1959	
Natural Sciences	Molecular and Cellular Biology	Charles Vernon Robinson	New England Center Hospital	Physiology of unicellular organisms, especially by the application of radioactive tracer techniques		
Natural Sciences	Molecular and Cellular Biology	William C. Rose	University of Illinois, Urbana-Champaign			
Natural Sciences	Molecular and Cellular Biology	Thomas Peter Singer	Case Western Reserve University	Intermediary metabolism of microorganisms	Collaboration with Edna B. Kearney; also won in 1959	
Natural Sciences	Molecular and Cellular Biology	Roger Yate Stanier	University of California, Berkeley	Biochemical mechanisms of oxidative metabolism in bacteria	Also won in 1945 and 1967	
Natural Sciences	Molecular and Cellular Biology	Alma Joslyn Whiffen-Barksdale	Upjohn Company	Resistance of microorganisms to the actions of antibiotics		
Natural Sciences	Organismic Biology and Ecology	Oliver L. Austin		Birds of Japan		
Natural Sciences	Organismic Biology and Ecology	Rachel Carson	US Fish and Wildlife Service	Ecology of seashore animals on the Atlantic coast		
Natural Sciences	Organismic Biology and Ecology	William Steel Creighton	University of Colorado (visiting)	Distribution of ants in the southwestern United States and northern Mexico	Also won in 1952	
Natural Sciences	Organismic Biology and Ecology	Maxwell John Dunbar	McGill University	Arctic marine biology		
Natural Sciences	Organismic Biology and Ecology	Richard Benedict Goldschmidt	University of California, Berkeley			
Natural Sciences	Organismic Biology and Ecology	Francis Harper		William Bartram	Also won in 1950	
Natural Sciences	Organismic Biology and Ecology	Clarence Cook Little	Roscoe B. Jackson Memorial Laboratory			
Natural Sciences	Organismic Biology and Ecology	Joe Truesdell Marshall, Jr.	University of Arizona	Birds of the oak-prine association in the mountains of southern Arizona and northern Mexico		
Natural Sciences	Organismic Biology and Ecology	Herbert Holdsworth Ross	University of Illinois	Evolution and geographical distribution of the caddisflies		
Natural Sciences	Organismic Biology and Ecology	Alexander Frank Skutch		Evolution of ornamental plumage, song, and social cooperation in birds	Also won in 1946	
Natural Sciences	Organismic Biology and Ecology	Curt Stern	University of California, Berkeley	Differentiation in relation to genes	Also won in 1962	
Natural Sciences	Organismic Biology and Ecology	Albert Tyler	California Institute of Technology	Physiology of animal fertilization		
Natural Sciences	Physics	Willard Libby	University of Chicago	Methods of historical dating by radiocarbon content	Also won in 1941 and 1959	
Natural Sciences	Physics	Mael A. Melvin		Theory of generalized symmetry	Also won in 1956	
Natural Sciences	Physics	John Rader Platt	University of Chicago	Electronic spectra of conjugated organic molecules		
Natural Sciences	Plant Science	Henry N. Andrews, Jr.	Washington University in St. Louis and Missouri Botanical Garden	Petrified plants of the central coal fields of the United States	Also won in 1958 and 1961	
Natural Sciences	Plant Science	Sterling Howard Emerson	California Institute of Technology	Interrelated gene controlled reactions in the fungus neurospora		
Natural Sciences	Plant Science	E. D. Merrill		Research on the British Museum's Malaysian collection		
Natural Sciences	Plant Science	Eldon Henry Newcomb	University of Wisconsin	Respiratory processes in plants		
Natural Sciences	Plant Science	Nicholas Polunin		Botany of the Arctic	Also won in 1950	
Natural Sciences	Plant Science	Albert N. Steward	University of Nanking (visiting)	Vascular plants of the lower Yangtze Valley		
Natural Sciences	Plant Science	Leland Shanor	University of Illinois	Fungus exoparasites of insects		
Natural Sciences	Statistics	Leonard Jimmie Savage	University of Chicago	Mathematical statistics	Also won in 1958 and 1967	
Social Sciences	Anthropology and Cultural Studies	Kenneth Earl Kidd	Royal Ontario Museum	French, English, and Dutch trade goods imported into northeastern North America during the French regime		
Social Sciences	Anthropology and Cultural Studies	Bertram Shirley Kraus	University of Arizona	Inheritance of human dental traits		
Social Sciences	Anthropology and Cultural Studies	Walter Collins O'Kane				
Social Sciences	Economics	Richard A. Musgrave	University of Michigan	Theory of public finance	Also won in 1965	
Social Sciences	Economics	Edwin G. Nourse		Possibilities of an approach to dynamic stabilization of free enterprise within the structure of free government	Also won in 1950	
Social Sciences	Economics	Siegfried V. Wantrup	University of California, Berkeley	Economics of stream and flood control	Also won in 1947	
Social Sciences	Economics	William Rulon Williamson		Research toward a book on taxation in social budgeting		
Social Sciences	Law	Albert A. Ehrenzweig	University of California, Berkeley	Legal questions concerning losses caused by hazardous enterprise		
Social Sciences	Law	Alpheus Thomas Mason		Biography of Harlan Fiske Stone		
Social Sciences	Law	Samuel E. Thorne	Yale University	History of English law in the reign of Queen Elizabeth	Also won in 1948, 1956	
Social Sciences	Political Science	Alexander Brady	University of Toronto	Democratization of the British state in the 20th century and the effects on the democratic process upon the traditional British political system		
Social Sciences	Political Science	George Hathaway Dession	Yale University	Research for a book tentatively titled The Technique of Public Order		
Social Sciences	Political Science	Carl J. Friedrich	Harvard University	Conflict between the concept of civil liberties and the doctrine of "reason of state"	Also won in 1954	
Social Sciences	Political Science	William Weed Kaufmann	Yale University	Process of making decisions in foreign affairs, as illustrated by the British and American experience in the 19th and 20th centuries		
Social Sciences	Political Science	Samuel J. Konefsky	Brooklyn College	Book about the Supreme Court, tentatively titled Holmes and Brandeis: A Study in the Influence of Ideas	Also won in 1950	
Social Sciences	Political Science	Louise Overacker	Wellesley College	Labor parties of Australia and New Zealand		
Social Sciences	Political Science	Alice Fleenor Sturgis		Structure and operation of some of the larger national organizations of the United States		
Social Sciences	Psychology	Fritz Heider	University of Kansas	Work on The Psychology of Interpersonal Relations (published 1958)	Also won in 1947	
Social Sciences	Psychology	Anne Roe		Creative process in science and its relation to personality		
Social Sciences	Sociology	Wolfram Eberhard	University of California, Berkeley	Social structure of southeastern Anatolia	Also won in 1950	
Social Sciences	Sociology	T. Lynn Smith	University of Florida	Demographic studies of the peoples of Latin America	Also won in 1953	
Social Sciences	Sociology	Kimball Young	Northwestern University	Rise and functioning of plural marriage among the Mormons		

== 1951 Latin American and Caribbean Fellows ==
Category	Field of Study	Fellow	Institutional association	Research topic	Notes	Ref
Creative Arts	Fiction	Pierre Marcelin		Writing		
Creative Arts	Fiction	Philippe Thoby-Marcelin		Writing		
Creative Arts	Fine Arts	José Vela Zanetti		Mural for the United Nations	Also won in 1952	
Humanities	Iberian and Latin American History	Edmundo O'Gorman	Universidad Nacional Autónoma de México			
Humanities	Medieval History	José Luis Romero		Research at Harvard University	Also won in 1969	
Humanities	Spanish and Portuguese Literature	Amado Alonso	Harvard University	History of medieval Spanish pronunciation and its development into modern form		
Natural Sciences	Earth Science	João José Bigarella	University of Arizona (student)			
Natural Sciences	Earth Science	Carlos de Paula Couto	National Museum of Brazil		Also won in 1949, 1966	
Natural Sciences	Mathematics	José Adem	Universidad Nacional Autónoma de México		Also won in 1952	
Natural Sciences	Medicine and Health	Augusto A. Camara	University of Michigan		Also won in 1950	
Natural Sciences	Medicine and Health	Ephraim Donoso	Mount Sinai Hospital		Also won in 1952	
Natural Sciences	Medicine and Health	Roberto E. Mancini	Instituto Nacional de Endocrinologia			
Natural Sciences	Medicine and Health	Juan García Ramos	Instituto Nacional de Cardiología		Also won in 1948	
Natural Sciences	Molecular and Cellular Biology	Danko Brncic	University of São Paulo	Research with Theodosius Dobzhansky	Also won in 1969	
Natural Sciences	Molecular and Cellular Biology	Francisco J. S. Lara	Hopkins Marine Station		Also won in 1950	
Natural Sciences	Neuroscience	José Bebin	National University of San Marcos		Also won in 1950	
Natural Sciences	Neuroscience	Mario Altamirano	Instituto Central de Neurología			
Natural Sciences	Organismic Biology and Ecology	Raymond Millard Cable	Purdue University	Marine trematodes parasitic in fishes in the region of Puerto Rico		
Natural Sciences	Plant Science	Domingo Cozzo				
Natural Sciences	Plant Science	José Cuatrecasas			Also won in 1950	
Natural Sciences	Plant Science	Luis E. Gregory	United States Department of Agriculture Bureau of Plant Industry			
Natural Sciences	Plant Science	Jorge León	Instituto Interamericano de Ciencias Agrícolas	Research at Washington University in St. Louis and Missouri Botanical Garden	Also won in 1952	
Natural Sciences	Plant Science	Alicia Lourteig			Also won in 1952	
Social Sciences	Anthropology and Cultural Studies	Ricardo Alegría		Doctoral studies at Harvard University	Also won in 1953	
Social Sciences	Anthropology and Cultural Studies	Pedro Carrasco Pizana				
Social Sciences	Anthropology and Cultural Studies	Julio César Cubillos		Research with Emil Haury at the University of Arizona		
Social Sciences	Geography and Environmental Studies	Leví Marrero Artiles	Ministry of Education (Cuba)			
Social Sciences	Sociology	José Vicente Freitas Marcondes	Instituto de Direito Social			

== See also ==
- Guggenheim Fellowship
- List of Guggenheim Fellowships awarded in 1950
- List of Guggenheim Fellowships awarded in 1952
