= North Main–North Detroit Street Historic District =

Historic district in Ohio, United States

- U.S. National Register of Historic Places
- U.S. Historic district
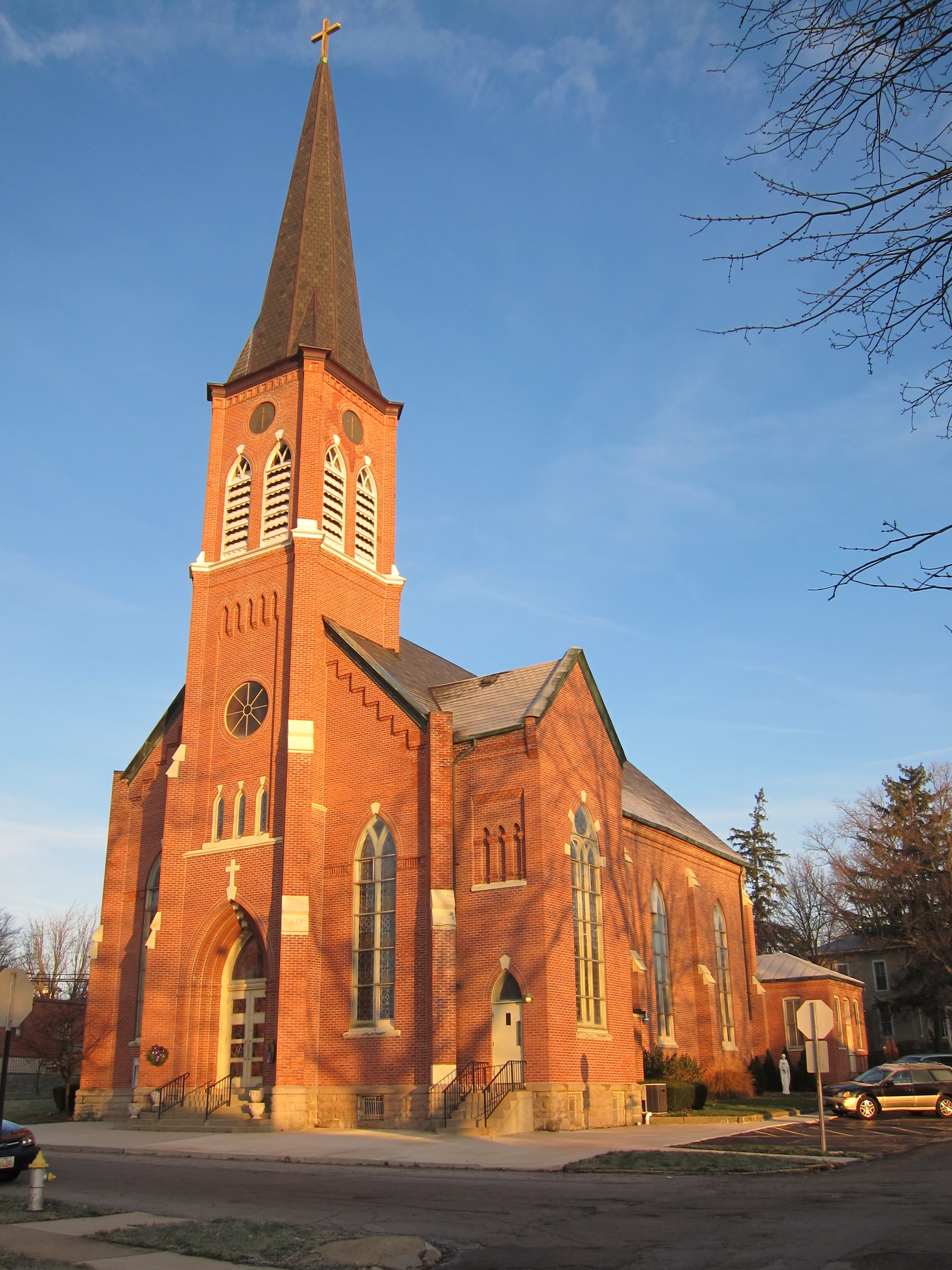
- Immaculate Conception Catholic Church

- Location within Ohio Location within the United States
- Location: Roughly Main St., bounded by Marie, Cherry, Carroll and Detroit Sts., Kenton, Ohio
- Coordinates: 40°39′1″N 83°36′27″W
- Area: 64 acres (26 ha)
- NRHP reference No.: 85000867
- Added to NRHP: April 18, 1985

The North Main–North Detroit Street Historic District is a historic neighborhood on the northern side of the city of Kenton, Ohio, United States. It was declared a historic district in 1985.

== Neighborhood profile ==
The blocks of Detroit and Main Streets north of downtown Kenton. Besides its elaborate homes, which were designed in various late Victorian styles of architecture, the district includes Kenton's Masonic temple, the former Hardin County Jail, and six churches. Among the other components of the district are numerous wrought-iron fences produced by a Champion Iron Fence Company, a Kenton company. One of the houses in the neighborhood has been converted into a museum; its displays concentrate on Kenton resident Jacob Parrott, a veteran of the Andrews Raid during the Civil War and the first recipient of the Medal of Honor. Among the architects who contributed to the district's architecture was Charles Crapsey, a resident of Cincinnati who specialized in ecclesiastical architecture.

== Historic designation ==
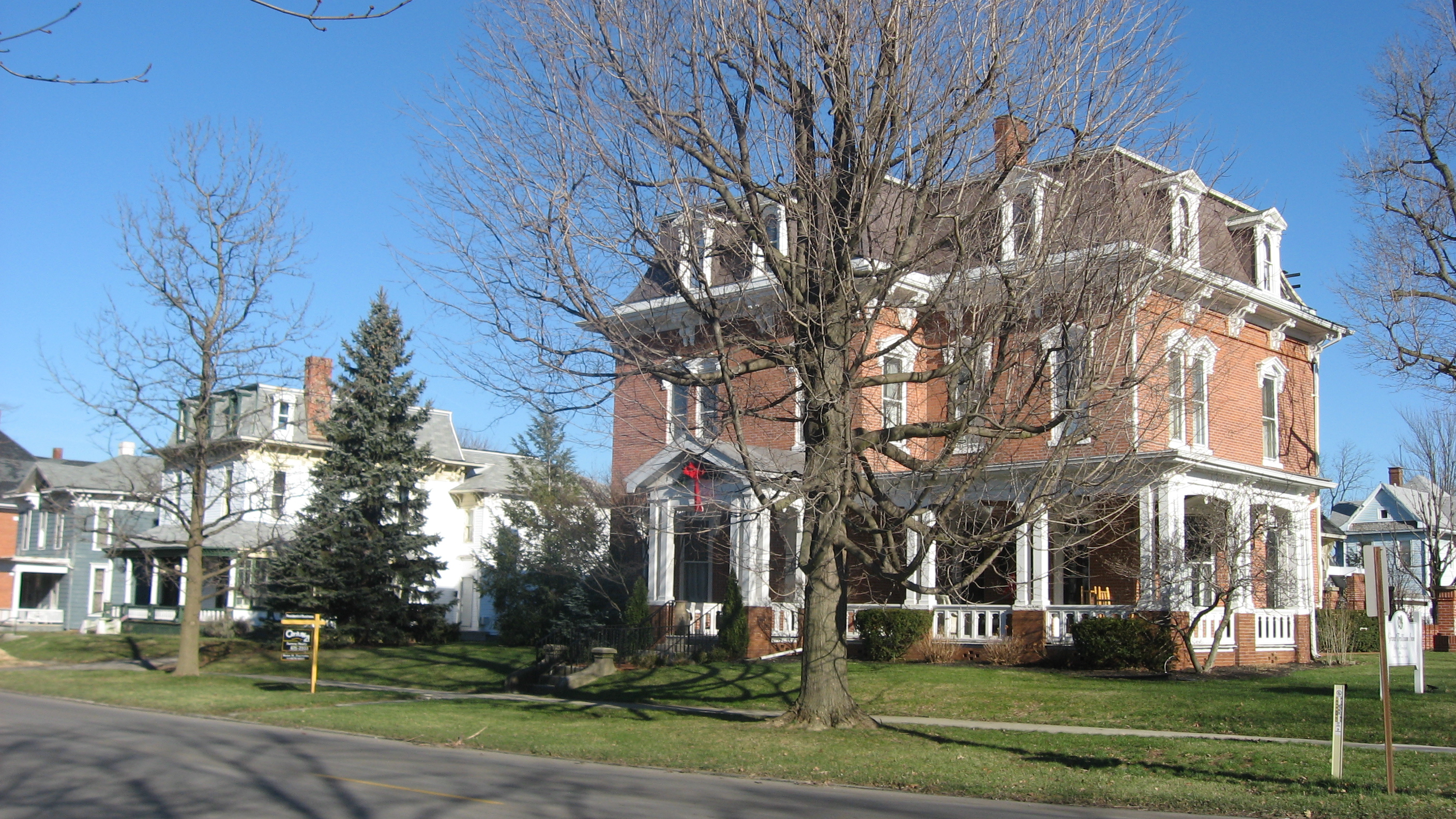
Second Empire-style houses on Main Street

In 1985, the North Main–North Detroit neighborhood was declared a historic district and listed on the National Register of Historic Places; the boundaries extended south to Carroll Street and north past Eliza Street, as well as stretching eastward to a small portion of Cherry Street. The area qualified as a historic district because of its architecture and because of the place that it had played in local history, both because of the importance of its early residents and because of the significant role of its institutional buildings. Within its 64 acres (26 ha) of land can be found 164 buildings, almost none of which are new or significantly altered; 158 of them qualified as contributing properties when the district was declared. It is one of four National Register-listed locations in Kenton, along with the Kenton Courthouse Square Historic District downtown, the courthouse itself, and the former Carnegie library on Detroit Street.
