= Edna B. Kearney =

American biochemist (1919–2002)

- Born: September 27, 1919; Nottingham, England
- Died: March 15, 2002 (aged 82)
- Occupation: Biochemist
- Spouse: Thomas Singer (divorced)
- Children: 1
- Awards: Guggenheim Fellowship (1951)

Academic background
- Education: University of Michigan; University of Wisconsin
- Thesis: Nutritional Studies in Neurotropic Virus Diseases (1947)
- Doctoral advisor: Paul Franklin Clark

Academic work
- Discipline: Biochemistry
- Institutions: Western Reserve University; Henry Ford Hospital; UCSF Medical Center; San Francisco VA Medical Center

Edna Beatrice Kearney (September 27, 1919 – March 15, 2002) was an American biochemist who worked at UCSF Medical Center and the San Francisco VA Medical Center. A 1951 Guggenheim Fellow alongside her husband Thomas Singer, she researched enzyme chemistry and intermediary metabolisms.

== Biography ==
Edna Beatrice Kearney was born on September 27, 1919, in Nottingham. She emigrated to the United States during her youth and was raised in Michigan, where she attended high school. She was later admitted on a scholarship to the University of Michigan, where she got a BS in 1941 and an MS in 1942. With the help of her laboratory's principal investigator, the future polio vaccine developer Jonas Salk, she was able to get into the University of Wisconsin's PhD program, obtaining the degree in 1947. Her doctoral dissertation Nutritional Studies in Neurotropic Virus Diseases was supervised by Paul Franklin Clark.

After originally working as a senior research fellow (1947–1949) at the National Cancer Institute, Kearney joined Western Reserve University in 1949 as a research associate in biochemistry. In 1954, she joined the Henry Ford Hospital's Edsel B. Ford Institute for Medical Research, serving in the biochemistry department from until 1965. After becoming a research chemist at the Veterans Administration Hospital in Madison, Wisconsin, in 1965, she moved to the San Francisco area in 1967, serving as an associate research pharmacologist at UCSF Medical Center until 1969. She joined the San Francisco VA Medical Center in 1970, and was promoted from research chemist to research career scientist in 1981.

As a scientist, Kearney researched enzyme chemistry and intermediary metabolisms. In 1951, she and her husband were appointed Guggenheim Fellows to study microbial metabolism. As part of their work as Fellows, they worked under C. Fromageot and David Keilin. A. Neuberger said that her chapter of The Proteins (1954) she co-authored with her husband was "a stimulating account of recent work on an important group of enzymes" given how the omniscience of proteins in biochemistry proved an apparently difficulty for editors Hans Neurath and Kenneth Bailey. She and Singer co-wrote two articles in F. F. Nord's Advances in Enzymology series, with the newer one (also written with Vincent Massey) being called "an admirable review article in which a great deal of information, previously miscellaneous or conflicting, is brought into a coherent framework".

Kearney was married to her research partner Thomas Singer for fifteen years, before they divorced. The couple had one child.

Kearney died on March 15, 2002. She had retired years earlier to North Little Rock, Arkansas.
