= Ada Airport =

Airport in Ohio, United States

- IATA: none; ICAO: none; FAA LID: 0D7

Summary
- Airport type: Public
- Owner: Kevin A. Mierzejewski
- Serves: Ada, Ohio
- Elevation AMSL: 949 ft (289 m)
- Coordinates: 40°47′26″N 083°49′45″W

Map
- Location of airport in Ohio 0D7 (the United States)

Runways
Direction	Length		Surface
Direction	ft	m	Surface
09/27	1,955	596	Turf

Statistics (2008)
- Aircraft operations: 555
- Based aircraft: 17
- Source: Federal Aviation Administration

Ada Airport (FAA LID: 0D7) is a privately owned, public-use airport located one nautical mile (1.85 km) northwest of the central business district of Ada, a village in Hardin County, Ohio, United States.

== Facilities and aircraft ==
Ada Airport covers an area of 70 acres (28 ha) at an elevation of 949 feet (289 m) above mean sea level. It has one runway designated 09/27 with a turf surface measuring 1,955 by 110 feet (596 x 34 m). The airport is unattended.

The airport does not have a fixed-base operator.

For the 12-month period ending July 8, 2008, the airport had 555 aircraft operations, an average of 46 per month: 99% general aviation and 1% military. At that time there were 17 aircraft based at this airport: 82% single-engine airplanes and 18% ultralight.

Remarks:

- Deer on and in the vicinity of airport.
- Marked pline 720 feet (220 m) from runway 27 threshold.
- Ultralight activity on and in the vicinity of airport.
- Built before 1959.

== Accidents and incidents ==
- On December 6, 1985, a Cessna 320 ran out of fuel and crashed while being vectored to the Ada airport for a fuel stop.

== See also ==
- List of airports in Ohio
