= Charles E. Butler =

American poet

Charles Edward Butler
- Occupation: Poet
- Writing career
- Genre: Poetry

Charles Edward Butler (July 9, 1908 – July 13, 1981) was an American poet.

== Life ==
He was born in Denver, Colorado and graduated from the University of Colorado and the University of Chicago Graduate Library School. He served in the United States Army Air Forces in England in World War II where he wrote poetry. He was a staff sergeant. He went on to be a librarian at Longwood College in Farmville, Virginia.

His work appeared in The Atlantic, Poetry, Yank.

== Awards ==
- 1945 Yale Series of Younger Poets Competition for "Cut Is the Branch"
- 1951 Guggenheim Fellow

== Works ==
- Cut is the branch, etc., Yale University Press, 1945

=== Anthologies ===
- The Best from Yank the Army Weekly, World Publishing Co., Editors of Yank, 1945 "Lullaby". reprint. Kessinger Publishing. 2005. ISBN 978-1-4191-2012-1.
