= Ada, Ohio =

- Village
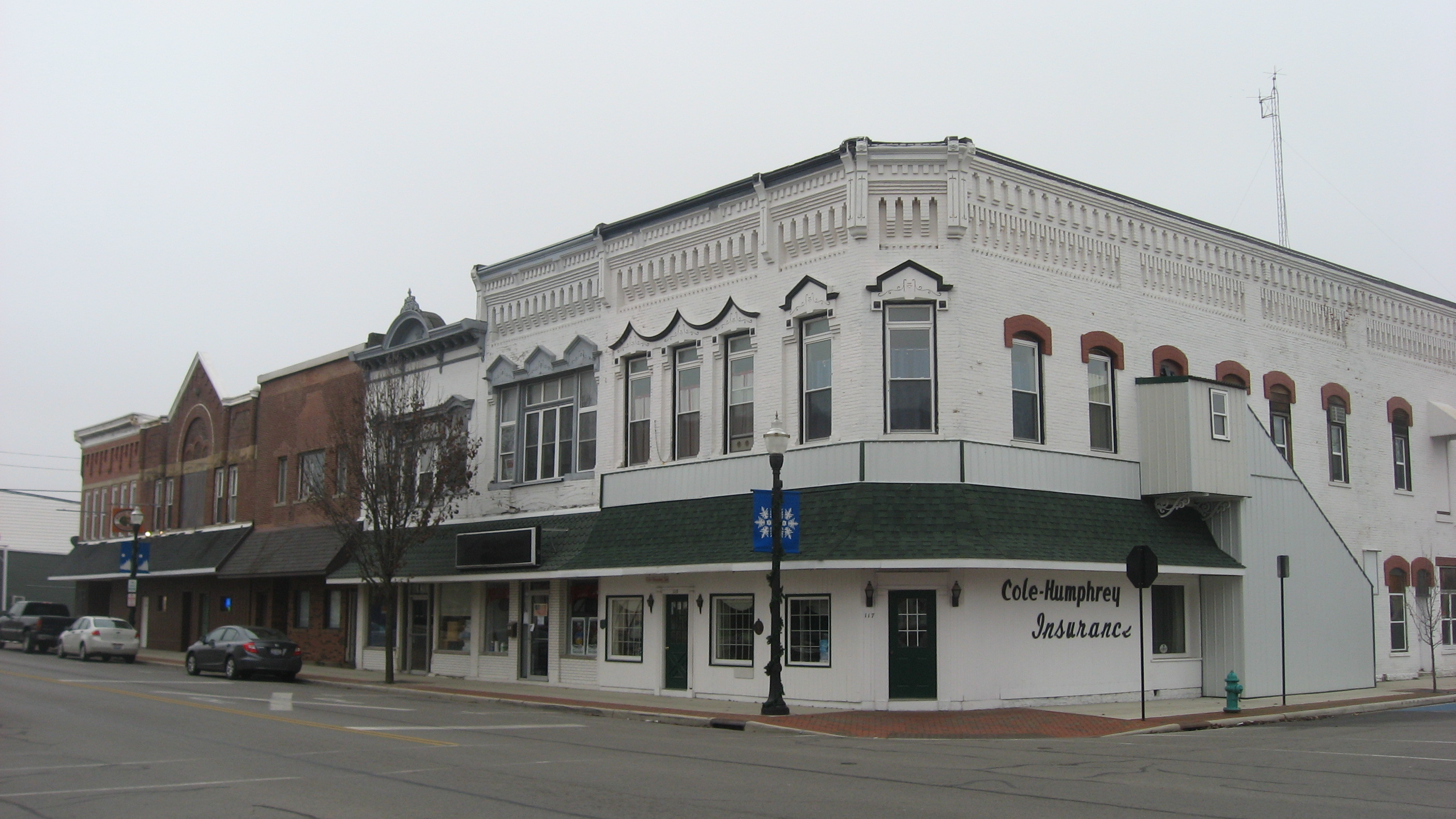
- Corner of Main Street and Buckeye Avenue

- Seal
- Nickname: "A Classic Ohio Village"
- Interactive map of Ada, Ohio
- Location within Ohio Location within the United States
- Coordinates: 40°46′05″N 83°49′31″W
- Country: United States
- State: Ohio
- County: Hardin
- Township: Liberty

Government
  - Mayor: Dave Retterer

Area
  - Total: 2.14 sq mi (5.53 km^{2})
  - Land: 2.14 sq mi (5.53 km^{2})
  - Water: 0 sq mi (0.00 km^{2})
- Elevation: 958 ft (292 m)

Population (2020)
  - Total: 5,334
  - Estimate (2023): 5,302
  - Density: 2,500/sq mi (965.3/km^{2})
- Time zone: UTC-5 (Eastern (EST))
  - Summer (DST): UTC-4 (EDT)
- ZIP code: 45810
- Area code: 419
- FIPS code: 39-00198
- GNIS feature ID: 2397907
- Website: adaoh.gov

Ada (/ˈeɪdə/ AY-də) is a village in Hardin County, Ohio, United States, located about 69 miles (111 km) southwest of Toledo. As of the 2020 census, its population was 5,334. It is the home of Ohio Northern University.

== History ==
Following the 1817 Treaty of Fort Meigs, the Shawnee Indians held reservation land at Hog Creek near Ada. Ada itself was originally called Johnstown, platted in 1853 by S. M. Johnson when the railroad was extended to that point. When a post office was established it was called Ada Post Office, named after the postmaster's daughter, Ada. The post office has been in operation since 1854.

The growth of the village is due in large part to the founding of the Ohio Normal School, now known as Ohio Northern University. The university was founded in 1871 by Henry Solomon Lehr, just eighteen years after Ada was first settled. Today, Ada is the second largest incorporated community in Hardin County.

In 1910, President William Howard Taft visited Ada, to give the fall commencement speech at Ohio Northern University. To date, Taft is the only president to visit the village. Ada welcomed Martin Luther King Jr. to the village in January 1968, just three months before his assassination.

In February 2026, the local Italian restaurant Viva Maria caught fire, devastating the building, the apartments above, and business beside it, The Cask Room. The cause of the fire was not determined when the state fire marshal closed the case.

In 2026, a datacenter moratorium was placed to delay or halt the construction of any datacenters within the village. In the July 21st council meeting, Democratic council member Sean Beck reported that the moratorium was nearing its end.

Ada has been noted for having one of the shortest place names in Ohio. The National Arbor Day Foundation has qualified Ada as a Tree City USA since 1981.

== Geography ==
According to the 2010 census, the village has a total area of 2.08 square miles (5.4 km^{2}), all land. The area surrounding the village is mostly farmland and small plots of forest. Hog Creek is the only waterway of note and snakes around the village to the north and the east.

== Demographics ==
Historical population
Census	Pop.	Note	%±
1880	1,760		—
1890	2,079		18.1%
1900	2,576		23.9%
1910	2,465		−4.3%
1920	2,321		−5.8%
1930	2,499		7.7%
1940	2,368		−5.2%
1950	3,640		53.7%
1960	3,918		7.6%
1970	5,309		35.5%
1980	5,669		6.8%
1990	5,413		−4.5%
2000	5,582		3.1%
2010	5,952		6.6%
2020	5,334		−10.4%
2023 (est.)	5,302	▼	−0.6%

=== 2010 census ===
As of the census of 2010, there were 5,952 people, 1,729 households, and 846 families living in the village. The population density was 2,861.5 inhabitants per square mile (1,104.8/km^{2}). There were 1,910 housing units at an average density of 918.3 per square mile (354.6/km^{2}). The racial makeup of the village was 93.5% White, 1.9% African American, 0.1% Native American, 1.9% Asian, 0.7% from other races, and 1.9% from two or more races. Hispanic or Latino of any race were 1.6% of the population.

There were 1,729 households, of which 24.7% had children under the age of 18 living with them, 37.7% were married couples living together, 8.2% had a female householder with no spouse present, 3.1% had a male householder with no spouse present, and 51.1% were non-families. 38.0% of all households were made up of individuals, and 8.5% had someone living alone who was 65 years of age or older. The average household size was 2.26 and the average family size was 3.01.

The median age in the village was 22.2 years. 13.6% of residents were under the age of 18; 49.5% were between the ages of 18 and 24; 17.2% were from 25 to 44; 13.5% were from 45 to 64; and 6.3% were 65 years of age or older. The gender makeup of the village was 50.8% male and 49.2% female.

=== 2000 census ===
As of the census of 2000, there were 5,582 people, 1,783 households, and 850 families living in the village. The population density was 2,982.7 inhabitants per square mile (1,151.6/km^{2}). There were 1,948 housing units at an average density of 1,040.9 per square mile (401.9/km^{2}). The racial makeup of the village was 95.50% White, 1.58% African American, 0.13% Native American, 1.25% Asian, 0.30% from other races, and 1.24% from two or more races. Hispanic or Latino of any race were 0.59% of the population.

There were 1,783 households, out of which 22.9% had children under the age of 18 living with them, 37.6% were married couples living together, 7.3% had a female householder with no spouse present, and 52.3% were non-families. 36.6% of all households were made up of individuals, and 9.0% had someone living alone who was 65 years of age or older. The average household size was 2.22 and the average family size was 2.92.

In the village, the population was spread out, with 13.9% under the age of 18, 48.6% from 18 to 24, 18.0% from 25 to 44, 12.5% from 45 to 64, and 7.1% who were 65 years of age or older. The median age was 22 years. For every 100 females, there were 96.1 males. For every 100 females age 18 and over, there were 94.4 males.

The median income for a household in the village was $24,665, and the median income for a family was $39,300. Males had a median income of $32,143 versus $23,750 for females. The per capita income for the village was $12,561. About 11.7% of families and 21.9% of the population were below the poverty line, including 10.9% of those under age 18 and 19.4% of those age 65 or over.

== Economy ==
The Wilson Sporting Goods NFL football manufacturing facility is located in Ada, and is the only leather football manufacturing facility in the United States.

== Government ==
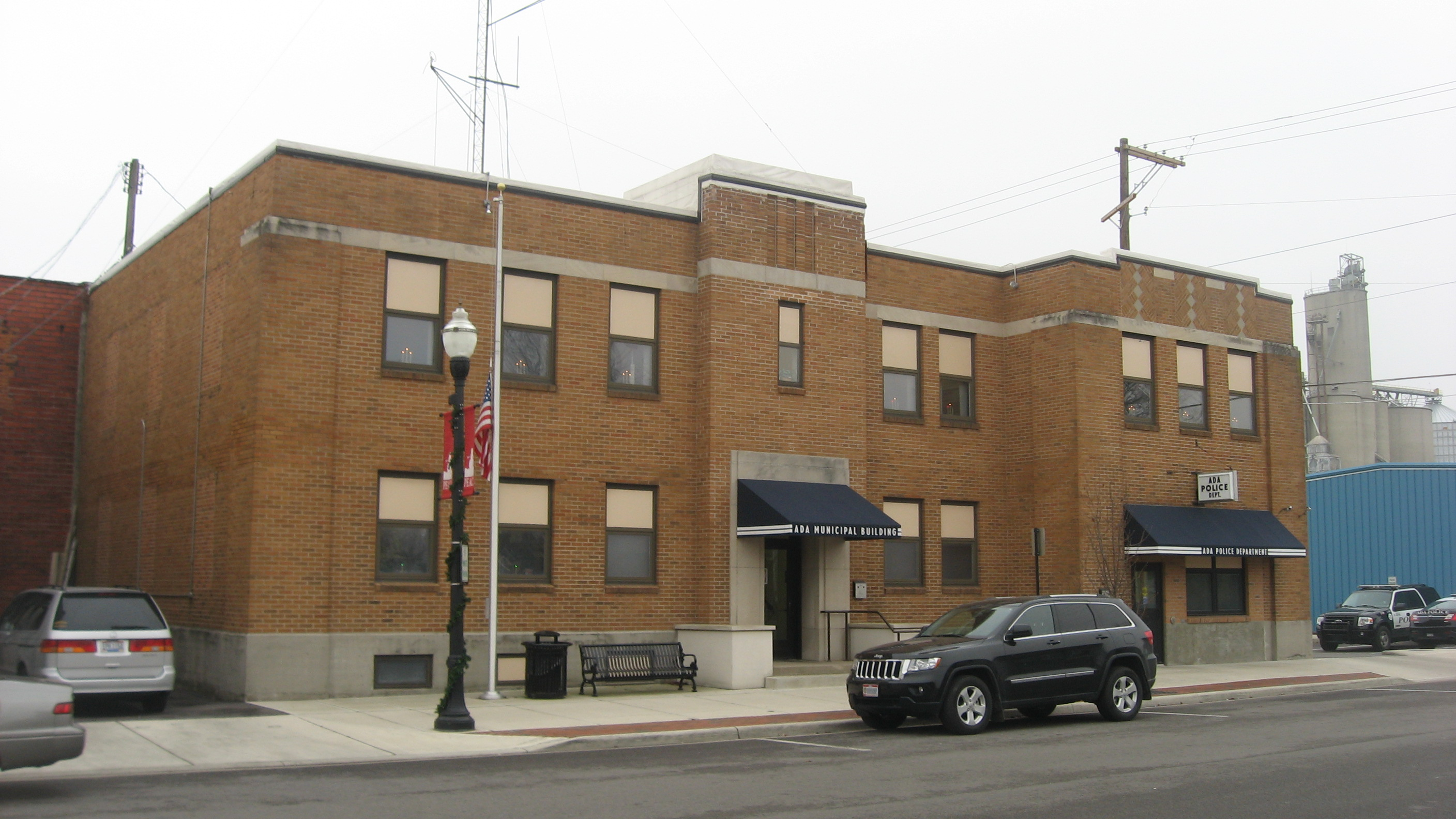
Ada Village Hall and police station

The village has a mayor, David A. Retterer, who has held the office since 2003. Retterer moved to the village in 1979 to become a mathematics professor at the local Ohio Northern University, before running for mayor for the first time in 2003. Retterer won a 6th term as mayor in 2023, defeating challenger Howard Fenton.

2023 Ada Mayoral Election
Party	Candidate	Votes	%
Republican	David A. Retterer	659	61.59%
Democratic	Howard N. Fenton	377	35.26%
Majority		1,036	100%

The village also elects a Village Council, made up of six representative elected on a rotating basis. There are no term limits to municipal offices in Ada. The Village Council is elected at large and by popular vote. The members are as follows:

Ada Village Council
Councilor	Party	Year of Term End
Lucas Rowe	Republican	2029
Linda Mason	Republican	2027
Sean Beck	Democratic	2029
Xander Wells	Democratic	2029
Jason Campbell	Republican	2029
Sheila Coressel	Democratic	2027

== Education ==
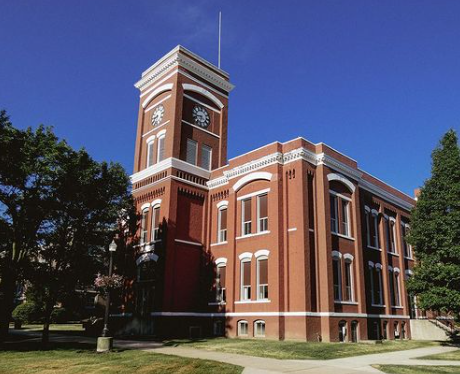
Hill Memorial Building on the campus of Ohio Northern University in Ada

Ada is the home of Ohio Northern University, a private university comprising five colleges.

Ada Exempted Village Public School houses grades K-12 and most of the administration. The district spends $7,701 per student annually ($925 lower than the state average). Ada High School's sports teams participate in the Blanchard Valley Conference, officially moving in 2023 after spending over fifty years in the Northwest Conference.

== Media ==
Two media outlets operate in Ada. AdaIcon.com is a news website, and WOHA, a non-commercial, religious radio station owned by Holy Family Communications. The Ada Herald weekly newspaper ceased publication in 2025.

== Transportation ==
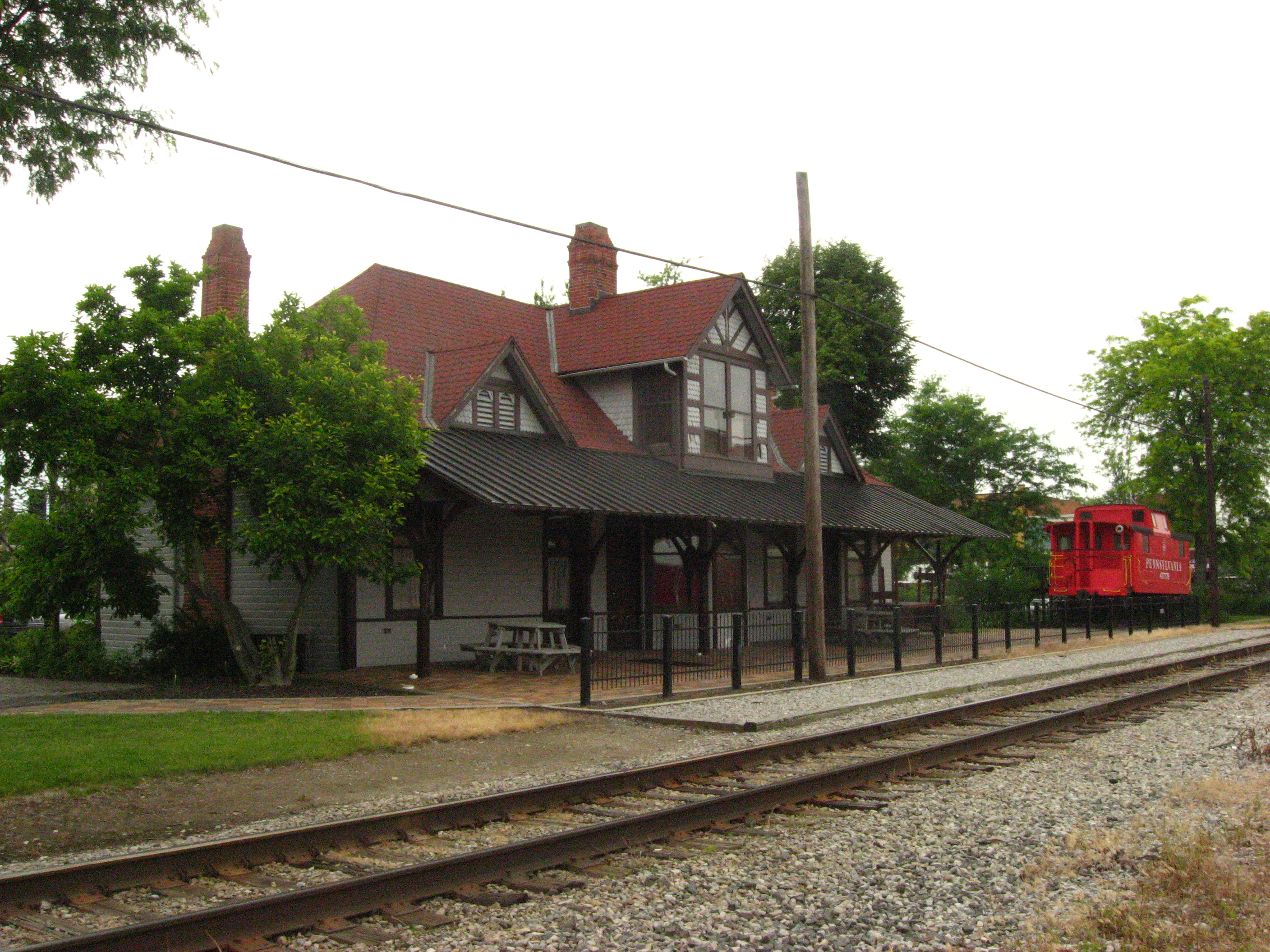
Ada station, built in 1887

Ada Airport (FAA LID: 0D7) is a privately owned, public-use airport located 1 nautical mile (1.9 km; 1.2 mi) northwest of the central business district of Ada. Ada station formerly operated along the Pennsylvania Railroad and is listed on the National Register of Historic Places.

== Notable people ==
- John Berton, computer graphics animator
- Lily Campbell, Shakespeare scholar and UCLA professor
- Zac Dysert, American football player
- Rollo May, an existential psychologist
- Carey Orr, cartoonist
- Lee Tressel, College Football Hall of Famer
