= Anne Roe =

American psychologist

- Born: 1904
- Died: May 29, 1991 (aged 86–87)
- Scientific career
- Fields: occupational psychology

Anne Roe Simpson (1904 – May 29, 1991) was an American clinical psychologist and researcher who studied creativity and occupational psychology. Her publications included The Making of a Scientist (1953) and the Psychology of Occupations (1956).

== Biography ==
Born in Denver, Colorado, her parents were Charles Edwin Roe and Edna Blake. There were three siblings. Roe received her Bachelor's (1923) and Master's (1925) degrees from the University of Denver. She received her Ph.D. at Columbia University (1933). Five years later, she married the paleontologist George Gaylord Simpson. She became stepmother to his four daughters. Roe served as a research associate and professor at Harvard's Graduate School of Education before founding and directing the school's Center for Research on Careers. In 1963, Roe became full professor, the ninth woman in the history of Harvard University to become a tenured faculty member, and the first woman to be tenured in the Harvard Faculty of Education. In 1967, the Roes retired in Tucson, Arizona, where she held an adjunct lectureship position at the University of Arizona. She died on Wednesday, May 29 at her home in Tucson, Arizona.

Her research included the psychology of people of superior intellect, alcoholism and its effect on creative artists, and creativity in scientists. She wrote more than 100 books and articles, including "The Making of a Scientist," published in 1952 by Dodd, Mead. There is also an extensive synopsis of her work in "Work and Human Behavior".

She also served as President of the American Board of Professional Psychology between 1953 and 1959; and Founder and president of the New England Psychological Association.

== Selected works ==
- Roe, A. (1953). A psychological study of eminent psychologists and anthropologists, and a comparison with biological and physical scientists. ''Psychological Monographs'' 67(2): 212–224.
- Roe, A. (1953). ''The making of a scientist.'' New York, NY: Dodd, Mead.
- Roe, A. (1956). ''The psychology of occupations.'' New York, NY: John Wiley & Sons.
- Roe, A. (1970). A survey of alcohol education in elementary and high schools in the United States. ''Quarterly Journal of Studies on Alcohol, 3,'' 3–132.
- Roe, A. (1972). ''Womanpower: How is it different?'' New York, NY: Columbia University Press.
- Roe, A. (1972). ''Perspectives on vocational development.'' Washington, DC: American Personnel and Guidance, Association.
- Roe, A. (1972). ''Womanpower: How is it different?'' New York: Columbia University Press.
- Roe, A. & Simpson, G.G. (Eds.). (1958). ''Behavior and evolution.'' New Haven, CT: Yale University Press.
- Simpson, G.G. & Roe, A. (1939). ''Quantitative zoology; numerical concepts and methods in the study of recent and fossil animals.'' New York: McGraw-Hill Book Company.

== Awards ==
- Lifetime Career Award from the National Vocational Guidance Association in 1967
- Leona Tyler award from the Clinical Psychology Division of the American Psychological Association (APA) in 1984

== See also ==
- List of Guggenheim Fellowships awarded in 1951
