= San Francisco VA Medical Center =

Coordinates: 37°46′56.2″N 122°30′17.5″W

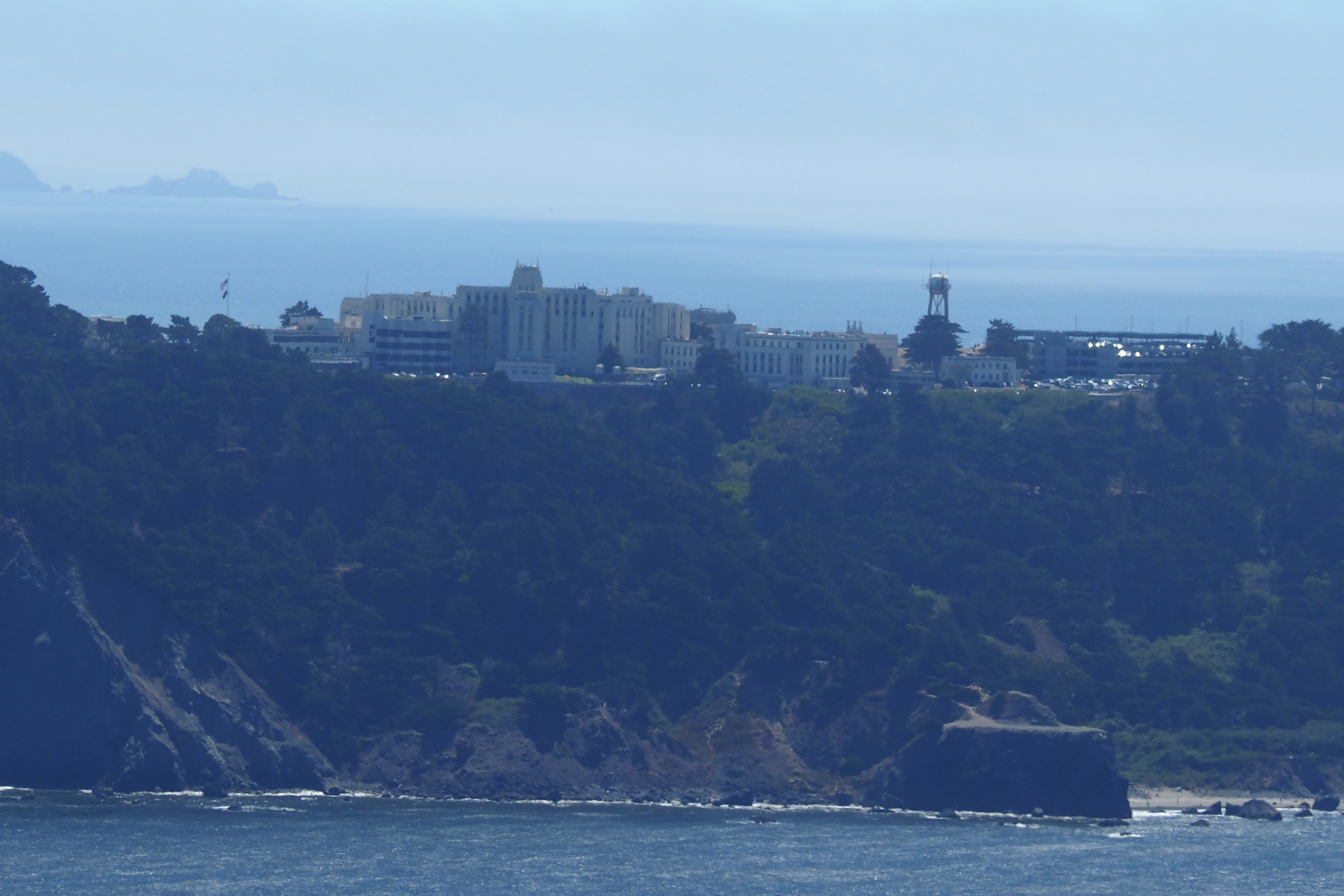
VA Medical Center viewed from the Marin Headlands

The San Francisco VA Medical Center, also called the San Francisco Veterans Affairs Medical Center or the SFVAMC, is a Veterans Affairs medical center, located in San Francisco. The main facility is on 42nd Avenue and Clement Street at the former Fort Miley Military Reservation in the Richmond District. Fort Miley is located south of the Golden Gate and west of the San Francisco Presidio, on Point Lobos (San Francisco) surrounded by the Golden Gate National Recreation Area.

SFVAMC has the largest funded research program in the Veterans Health Administration with $90.2 million in research expenditures (2015). It serves as a teaching hospital for the UCSF School of Medicine.

== History ==
The SFVAMC was founded in 1934.

Community-based outpatient clinics have been opened by the SFVAMC. They include:

- San Francisco VA Downtown Clinic – primary medical care, comprehensive homeless center, psychosocial and health care services.
- Clearlake VA Clinic, Clearlake
- Eureka VA Clinic, Eureka
- San Bruno VA Clinic, San Bruno
- Santa Rosa VA Clinic, Santa Rosa
- Ukiah VA Clinic, Ukiah

== Achievements ==
SFVAMC has several National Centers of Excellence in the areas of: Epilepsy treatment; Cardiac surgery; Posttraumatic stress disorder; HIV; and Renal dialysis.

The SFVAMC's "Telephone Linked Care Program" is accredited by the URAC.

== Partnerships ==
SFVAMC has been affiliated with the University of California, San Francisco School of Medicine (UCSF) for over 50 years. All physicians are jointly recruited by SFVAMC and UCSF School of Medicine.

The Northern California Institute of Research and Education is an independent non-profit research organization which is resident in the SFVAMC grounds.

The City College of San Francisco partnered with the SFVAMC to set up a veterans affairs health office on campus to target students using the G.I. Bill. The pilot program was reviewed by Craig Newmark in the San Francisco Chronicle, who stated that it is a good model for delivering healthcare services to young veterans nationwide.
