= Ada station =

Historic train station in Ohio, U.S.

Ada
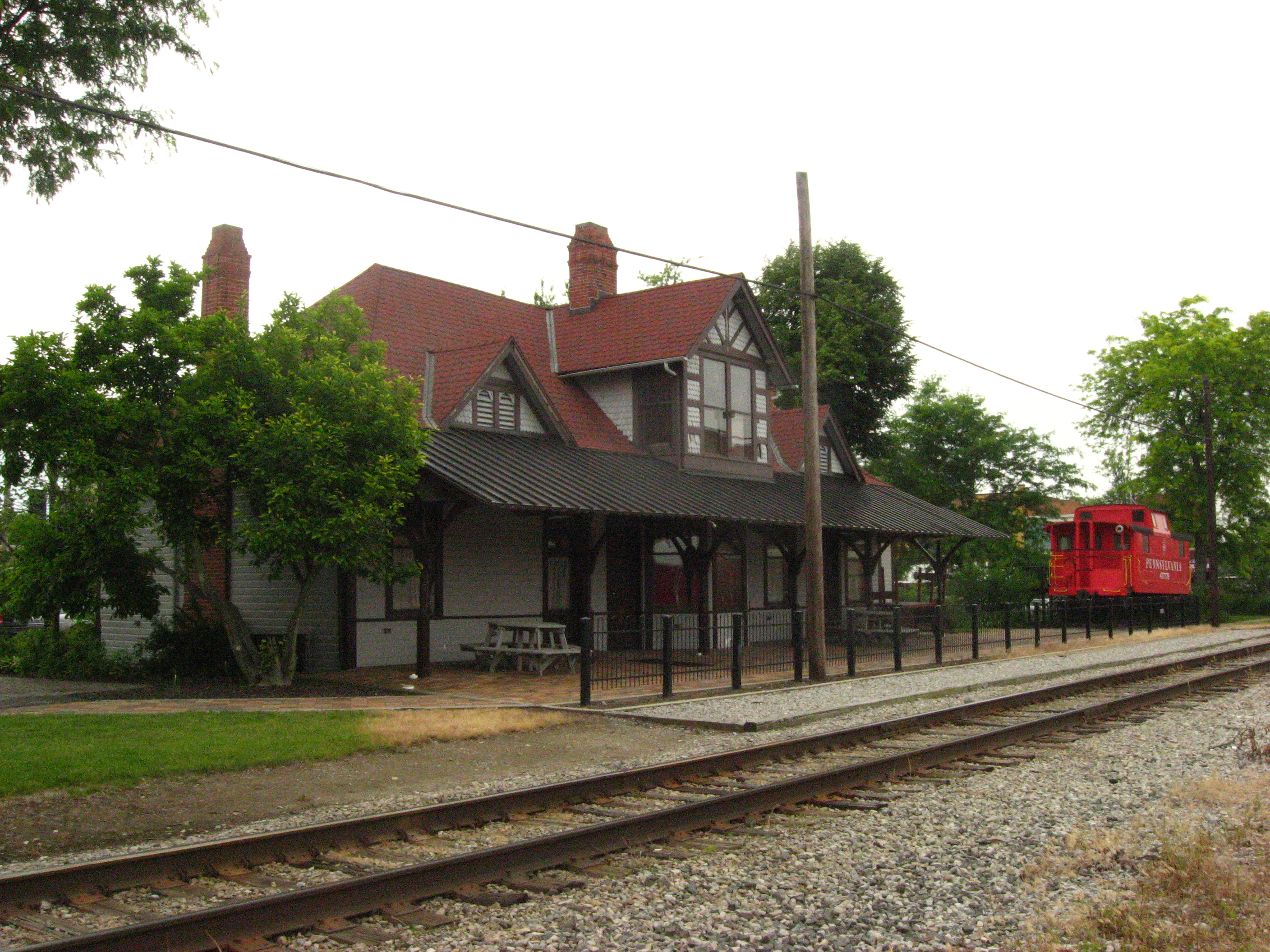
- Front of the station, with a caboose to the side

General information
- Location: 112 East Central Avenue, Ada, Ohio

Former services
Preceding station	Pennsylvania Railroad	Following station
Lafayette toward Chicago	Main Line	Dola toward New York or Exchange Place
- Ada Pennsylvania Station and Railroad Park
- U.S. National Register of Historic Places
- Location within Ohio Location within the United States
- Location: 112 East Central Avenue, Ada, Ohio
- Coordinates: 40°46′14″N 83°49′20″W
- Built: 1887
- Architect: Pennsylvania Railroad
- Architectural style: Stick-Eastlake
- NRHP reference No.: 98001014
- Added to NRHP: August 7, 1998
Location

Ada is a historic train station in Ada, Ohio, United States. Built in 1887 by the Pennsylvania Railroad, it was listed on the National Register of Historic Places in 1998 as the Ada Pennsylvania Station and Railroad Park. It is a wooden building, set on a stone foundation and topped with an asphalt roof. The railroad park includes a Pennsylvania Railroad caboose.

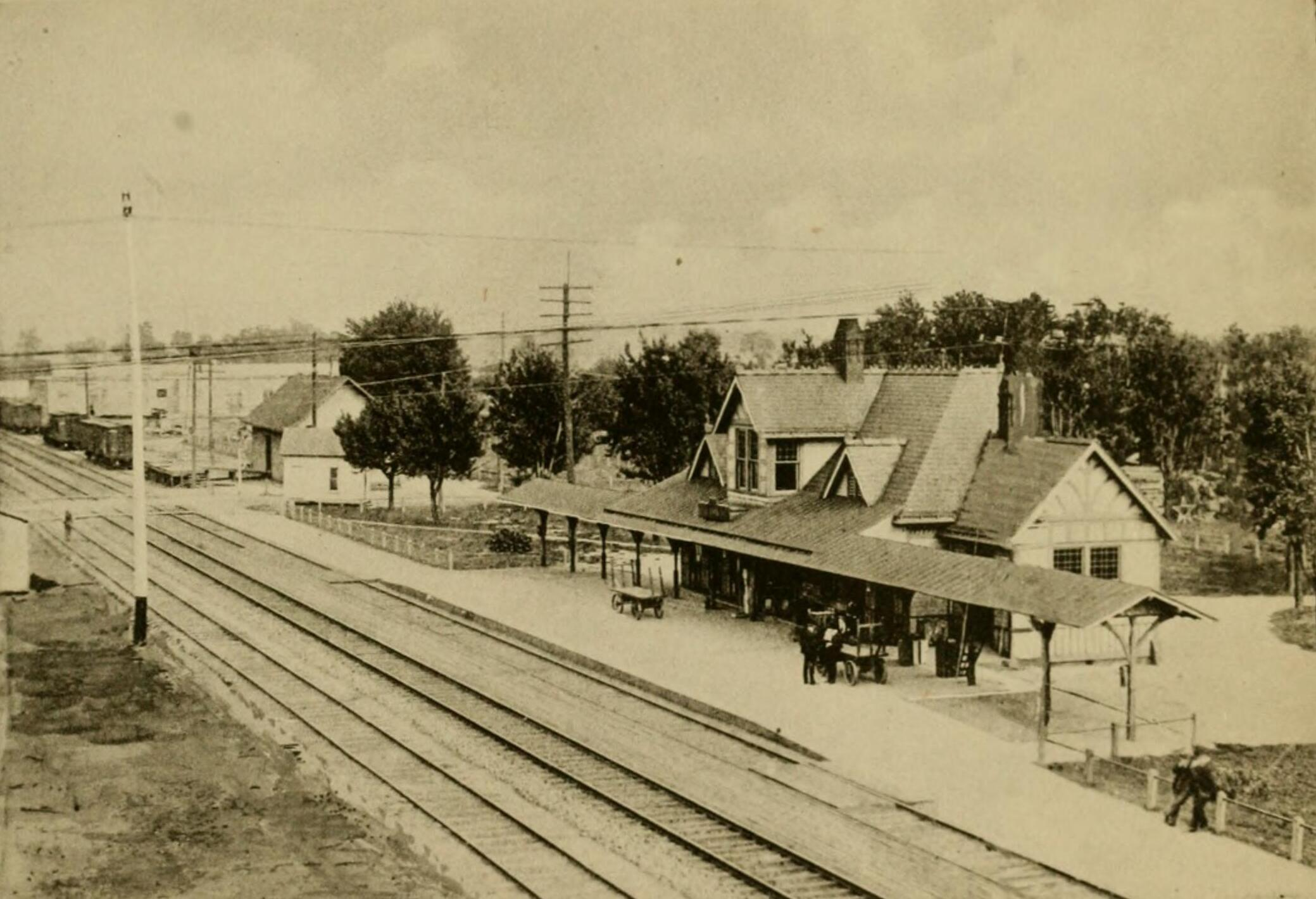
The station while in operation, circa 1902.

Founded as a railway town, Ada grew quickly after the establishment of Ohio Northern University in the city in the 1880s. Consequently, this station was built to accommodate increased passenger traffic; its Stick-Eastlake architecture is unusual for Pennsylvania Railroad depots, and it is larger than most stations built to serve small communities.
