= Lily Bess Campbell =

American educator

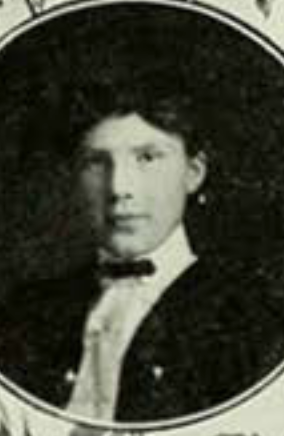
- Lily Beth Campbell, from the 1905 yearbook of the University of Texas
- Born: June 20, 1883; Ada, Ohio, U.S.
- Died: February 18, 1967 (age 83); Los Angeles, California, U.S.
- Occupation(s): Educator, literary scholar

Lily Bess Campbell (June 20, 1883 – February 18, 1967) was an American educator and Shakespeare scholar. She was an English professor at the University of California, Los Angeles (UCLA) from 1922 to 1950.

== Early life and education ==
Campbell was born in Ada, Ohio, and raised in Texas, the daughter of Zephaniah Beall Campbell and Anna Barrington Campbell. Her father was a Presbyterian minister. She graduated from the University of Texas in 1905, and earned a master's degree there in 1906. She was a member of Kappa Alpha Theta at Texas. She completed doctoral studies at the University of Chicago in 1921, encouraged by the example of Myra Reynolds.

== Career ==
Campbell taught English at the University of Wisconsin from 1911 to 1918, and worked for the YWCA as a regional executive secretary from 1918 to 1920. She was a professor of English at UCLA from 1922 to 1950. One of her students was choreographer Agnes De Mille.

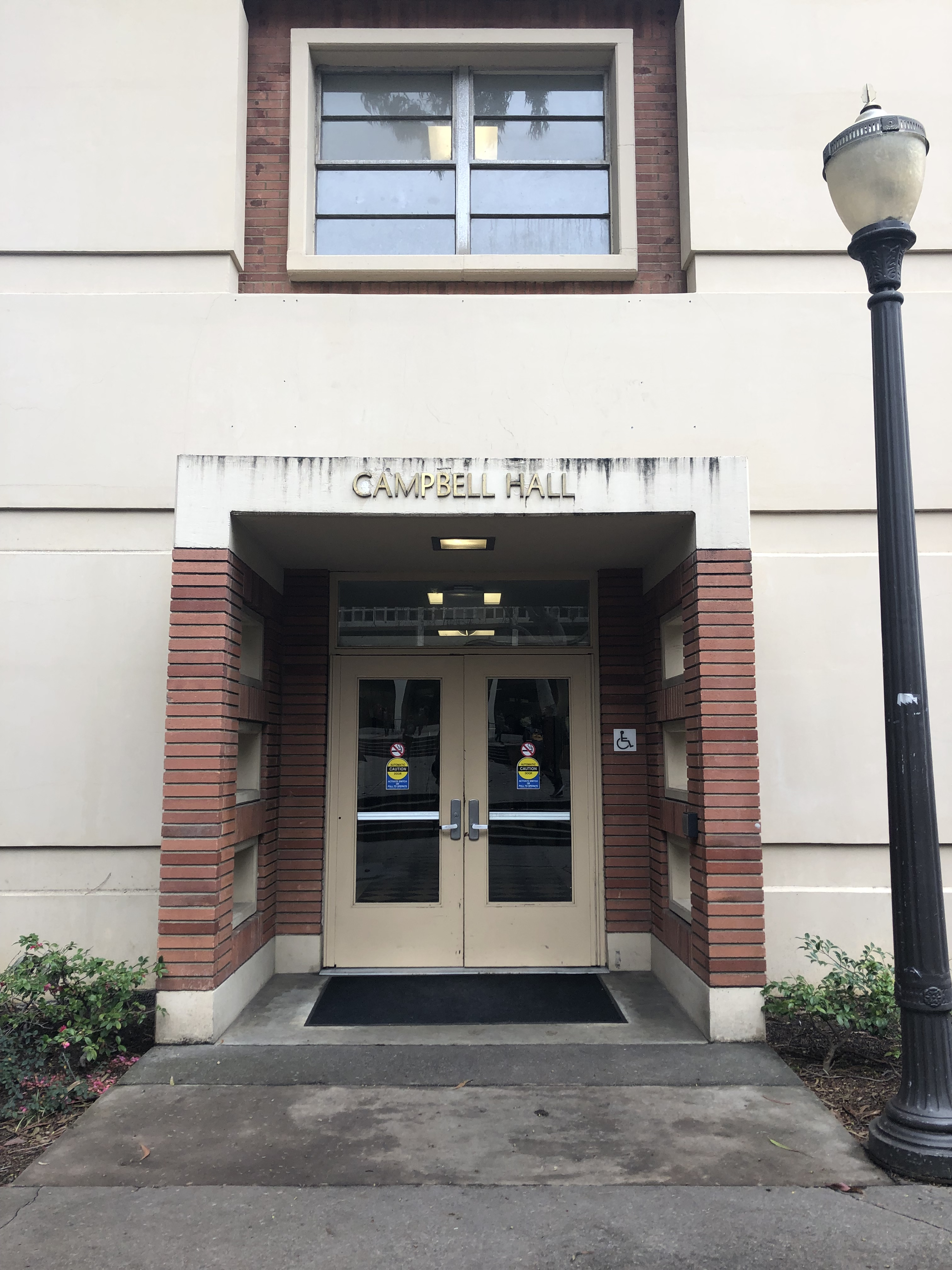
Campbell Hall, UCLA, northern entrance

Campbell held a Guggenheim Fellowship in 1951. She received an Achievement Award from the American Association of University Women in 1960, and was named Woman of the Year by the Los Angeles Times in 1962. "She is erudite without being dull; profound without being solemn, and she frequently brings to bear a flashing and satirical wit," wrote Louis B. Wright of the Folger Shakespeare Library in describing Campbell. "Pompous dullards rarely escape unseared."

== Publications ==
- The Grotesque in the Poetry of Robert Browning (1907)
- Scenes and Machines on the English Stage during the Renaissance, a Classical Revival (1923)
- These Are My Jewels (1929, novel)
- Shakespeare's Tragic Heroes, Slaves of Passion (1930)
- "Theories of Revenge in Elizabethan England" (1931)
- The Mirror for Magistrates (1938, critical edition edited by Campbell)
- Shakespeare's "Histories"; Mirrors of Elizabethan Policy (1947)
- Essays Critical And Historical Dedicated to Lily B. Campbell (1950, festschrift in her honor)
- Divine Poetry and Drama in Sixteenth-Century England (1959)

== Personal life and legacy ==
Campbell died in 1967, at the age of 83, in Los Angeles. Her papers are in the special collections library at UCLA. Campbell Hall on the UCLA campus is named in her honor.
