= Ruth Lee Kennedy =

American linguist

Ruth Lee Kennedy (1895-1988) was an American linguist known for her work on the 17th century Spanish dramatist Tirso de Molina. Kennedy was the first American woman to lecture at Oxford and Cambridge universities.

== Early life ==
Kennedy was born in Centerville, Texas. Her parents were Oliver William Kennedy and Carrie Lee McWaters Kennedy.

== Education ==
Kennedy received a B.A. in 1916 and an M.A. in 1917 in Spanish language and literature from the University of Texas in Austin. From 1924 to 1925 she attended graduate school at the University of California, Berkeley. In 1931 she received a Ph.D. from the University of Pennsylvania.

== Career ==
Kennedy taught high school Spanish in San Benito, Texas, from 1917 to 1918 and Temple, Texas, from 1918 to 1919. She then had a series of positions as an instructor at the Oklahoma College for Women (1918-1919), at Sam Houston State Teacher's College (1920-1921), at the University of Puerto Rico (1921-1922), at Southwest Texas State Teacher's College (1922-1926) and at San Antonio Junior College (1926-1930). In 1930 she joined the Spanish Department at Smith College. She became a full professor in 1944. In 1961, Kennedy retired from Smith College. She again worked as a professor at the University of Arizona until her retirement in 1970.

Kennedy was a longtime member of The American Association of Teachers of Spanish and Portuguese.

== Honors ==
In 1979, Kennedy was admitted to the Academia Norteamericana de la Lengua Espanola. In 1951, she received a Guggenheim Fellowship.

== Later years and death ==
In her retirement, Kennedy enjoyed gardening. She died in Tucson, Arizona at the age of 92.

== Selected works ==
- Studies in Tirso (1974)
- The Dramatic Art of Moreto (1932)
