= Kenton, Ohio =

City in the United States

- City
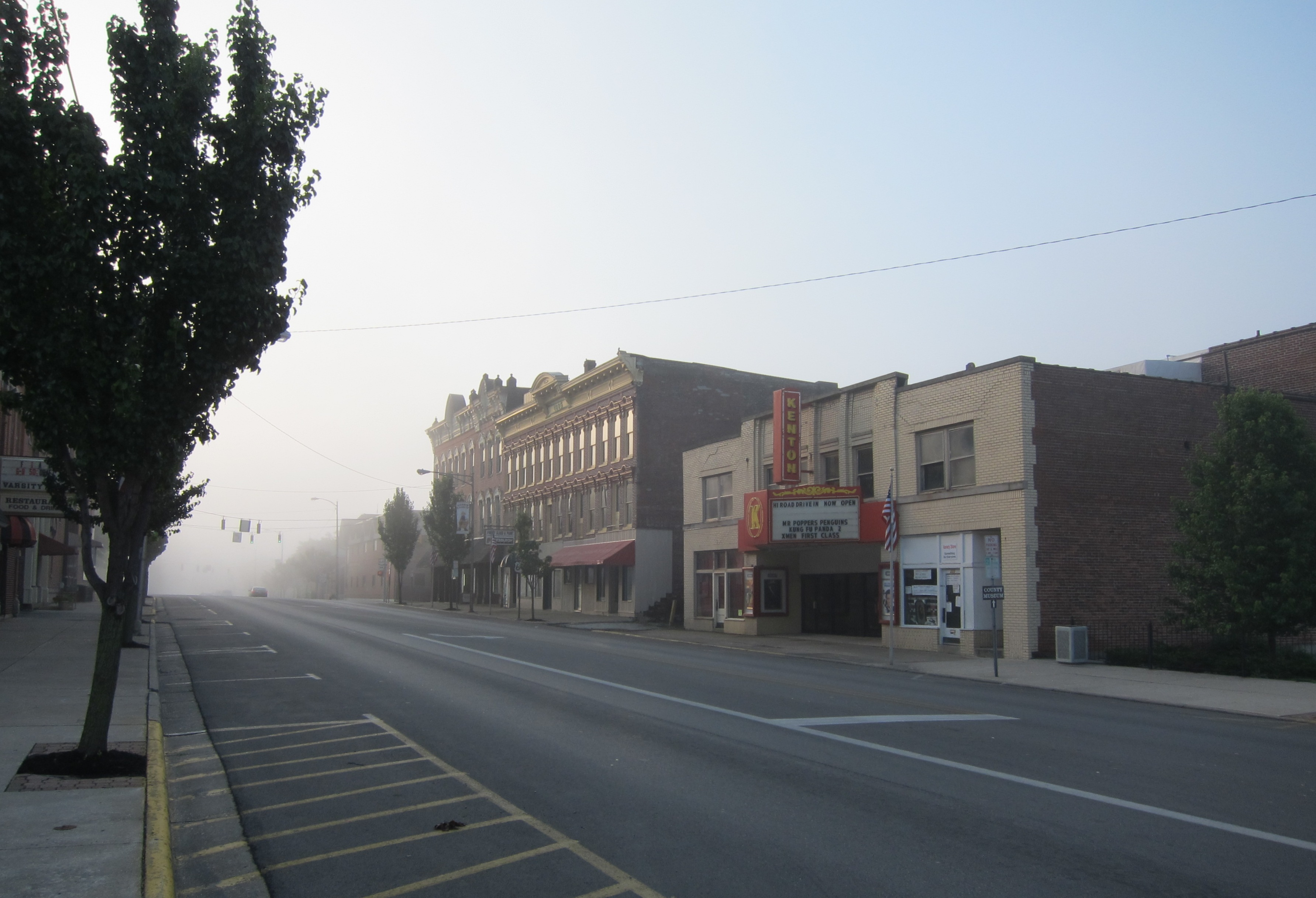
- Downtown Kenton

- Logo
- Motto: "Build With Us"
- Interactive map of Kenton, Ohio
- Location within Ohio Location within the United States
- Coordinates: 40°38′50″N 83°36′29″W
- Country: United States
- State: Ohio
- County: Hardin
- Township: Pleasant, Buck
- Incorporated: 1845 (village); 1886 (city)
- Named for: Simon Kenton

Government
  - Mayor: Lynn Jones Webb

Area
  - Total: 5.09 sq mi (13.19 km^{2})
  - Land: 5.00 sq mi (12.95 km^{2})
  - Water: 0.093 sq mi (0.24 km^{2})
- Elevation: 968 ft (295 m)

Population (2020)
  - Total: 7,947
  - Density: 1,589/sq mi (613.7/km^{2})
- Time zone: UTC-5 (Eastern (EST))
  - Summer (DST): UTC-4 (EDT)
- ZIP code: 43326
- Area code: 419 567
- FIPS code: 39-39886
- Website: City website

Kenton is a city in and the county seat of Hardin County, Ohio, United States, located in the west-central part of Ohio about 57 mi (92 km) northwest of Columbus and 70 mi (113 km) south of Toledo. Its population was 7,947 at the 2020 census. The city was named for frontiersman Simon Kenton of Kentucky and Ohio.

== History ==
Kenton was originally the site of Fort McArthur, erected in 1812 by Colonel Duncan McArthur as one of the forts along the line of General William Hull's march against the British headquarters at Fort Detroit during the War of 1812.

In 1845, Kenton was incorporated as a village; it became a city in 1886. The city was named after frontiersman Simon Kenton.

The city began as a center for agricultural trade, then in the late 19th century, developed industry common to America of the time. From 1890 to 1952, Kenton was home to the Kenton Hardware Company, manufacturers of locks, cast-iron toys, and the very popular Gene Autry toy cap guns.

International Car Company, a manufacturer of rail cabooses, operated in Kenton for many years. In 1975, it was purchased by Paccar, a manufacturer of medium- and heavy-duty trucks. In 1983, Paccar closed down the business, noting a decrease in demand for rail equipment.

The 2001 CSX 8888 incident involving an unmanned freight train ended in Kenton.

== Geography ==
According to the United States Census Bureau, the city has a total area of 5.13 square miles (13.29 km^{2}), of which 0.09 square miles (0.23 km^{2}) is covered by water.

=== Climate ===
Climate data for Kenton, Ohio, 1991–2020 normals, extremes 1893–2014
Month	Jan	Feb	Mar	Apr	May	Jun	Jul	Aug	Sep	Oct	Nov	Dec	Year
Record high °F (°C)	71 (22)	74 (23)	85 (29)	91 (33)	96 (36)	104 (40)	106 (41)	103 (39)	101 (38)	91 (33)	79 (26)	71 (22)	106 (41)
Mean maximum °F (°C)	54.6 (12.6)	60.5 (15.8)	72.3 (22.4)	81.8 (27.7)	86.9 (30.5)	93.1 (33.9)	94.6 (34.8)	92.9 (33.8)	89.6 (32.0)	81.7 (27.6)	69.7 (20.9)	57.3 (14.1)	95.9 (35.5)
Mean daily maximum °F (°C)	32.7 (0.4)	36.3 (2.4)	46.9 (8.3)	60.1 (15.6)	71.5 (21.9)	80.6 (27.0)	84.0 (28.9)	82.6 (28.1)	76.5 (24.7)	63.6 (17.6)	49.7 (9.8)	37.8 (3.2)	60.2 (15.7)
Daily mean °F (°C)	25.5 (−3.6)	28.4 (−2.0)	37.9 (3.3)	49.7 (9.8)	60.8 (16.0)	70.5 (21.4)	74.0 (23.3)	72.3 (22.4)	65.4 (18.6)	53.2 (11.8)	41.2 (5.1)	30.8 (−0.7)	50.8 (10.4)
Mean daily minimum °F (°C)	18.3 (−7.6)	20.5 (−6.4)	28.9 (−1.7)	39.2 (4.0)	50.2 (10.1)	60.4 (15.8)	64.0 (17.8)	61.9 (16.6)	54.3 (12.4)	42.7 (5.9)	32.7 (0.4)	23.8 (−4.6)	41.4 (5.2)
Mean minimum °F (°C)	−1.7 (−18.7)	2.5 (−16.4)	10.9 (−11.7)	23.9 (−4.5)	36.6 (2.6)	46.5 (8.1)	52.1 (11.2)	50.2 (10.1)	39.7 (4.3)	29.3 (−1.5)	19.4 (−7.0)	4.4 (−15.3)	−6.7 (−21.5)
Record low °F (°C)	−24 (−31)	−21 (−29)	−10 (−23)	10 (−12)	23 (−5)	31 (−1)	41 (5)	35 (2)	27 (−3)	14 (−10)	−4 (−20)	−20 (−29)	−24 (−31)
Average precipitation inches (mm)	2.63 (67)	2.55 (65)	2.78 (71)	3.69 (94)	3.72 (94)	3.85 (98)	3.43 (87)	3.56 (90)	3.11 (79)	2.62 (67)	2.94 (75)	2.76 (70)	37.64 (957)
Average snowfall inches (cm)	9.3 (24)	7.4 (19)	4.5 (11)	0.3 (0.76)	0.0 (0.0)	0.0 (0.0)	0.0 (0.0)	0.0 (0.0)	0.0 (0.0)	0.1 (0.25)	0.7 (1.8)	3.5 (8.9)	25.8 (65.71)
Average precipitation days (≥ 0.01 in)	9.3	7.6	9.3	11.0	10.3	9.6	8.3	7.5	7.4	7.7	7.6	8.1	103.7
Average snowy days (≥ 0.1 in)	4.1	4.1	2.0	0.2	0.0	0.0	0.0	0.0	0.0	0.1	0.7	3.3	14.5
Source 1: NOAA
Source 2: National Weather Service (mean maxima/minima 1981–2010)

== Demographics ==
Historical population
Census	Pop.	Note	%±
1840	299		—
1850	1,065		256.2%
1860	1,612		51.4%
1870	2,610		61.9%
1880	3,940		51.0%
1890	5,557		41.0%
1900	6,852		23.3%
1910	7,185		4.9%
1920	7,690		7.0%
1930	7,069		−8.1%
1940	7,593		7.4%
1950	8,475		11.6%
1960	8,747		3.2%
1970	8,315		−4.9%
1980	8,605		3.5%
1990	8,356		−2.9%
2000	8,336		−0.2%
2010	8,262		−0.9%
2020	7,947		−3.8%

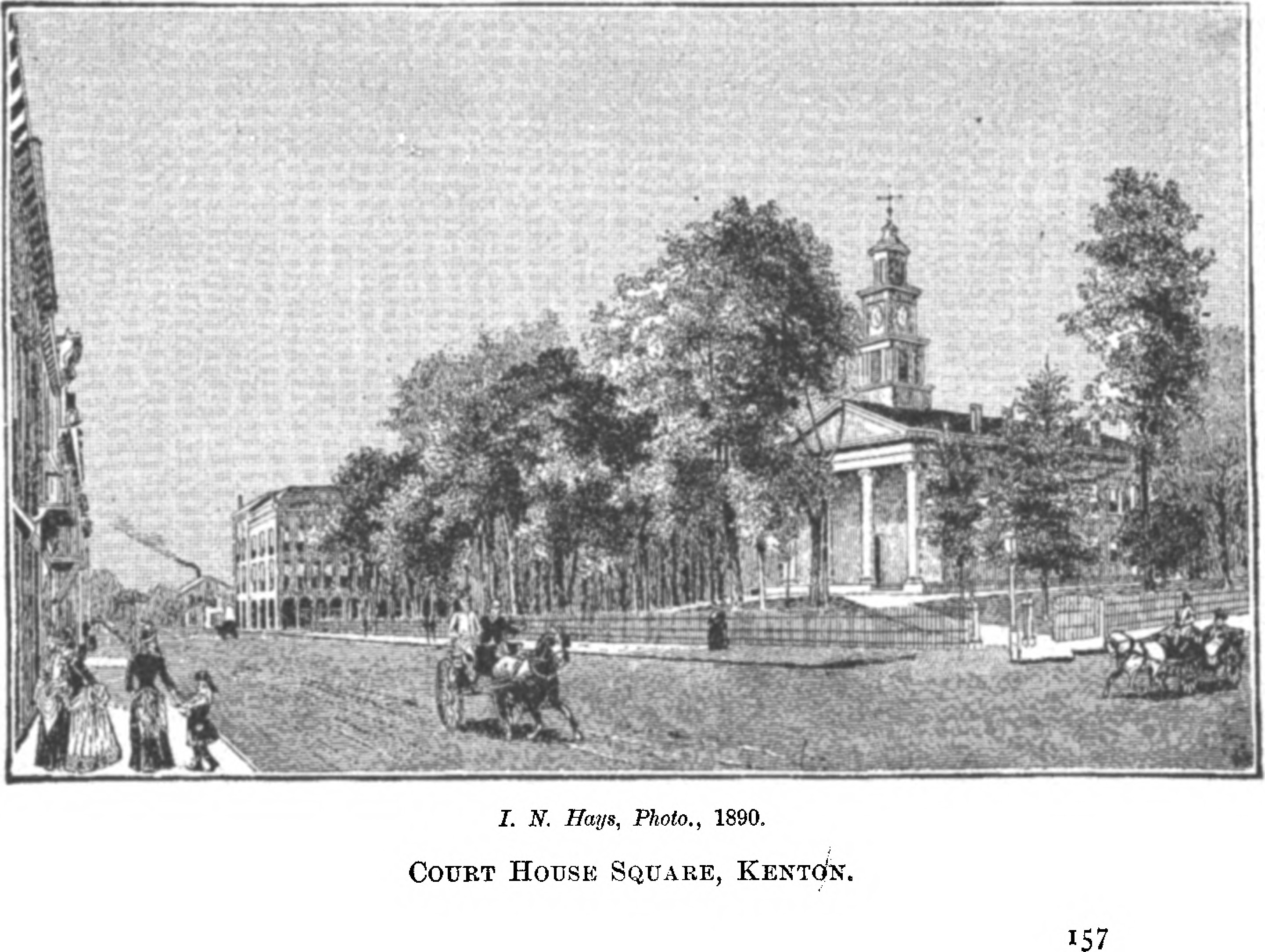
Courthouse Square in 1890

=== 2020 census ===
As of the 2020 census, Kenton had a population of 7,947. The median age was 40.1 years. 24.3% of residents were under the age of 18 and 19.5% of residents were 65 years of age or older. For every 100 females there were 91.3 males, and for every 100 females age 18 and over there were 87.9 males age 18 and over.

98.8% of residents lived in urban areas, while 1.2% lived in rural areas.

There were 3,365 households in Kenton, of which 28.4% had children under the age of 18 living in them. Of all households, 35.6% were married-couple households, 21.0% were households with a male householder and no spouse or partner present, and 34.4% were households with a female householder and no spouse or partner present. About 36.5% of all households were made up of individuals and 18.0% had someone living alone who was 65 years of age or older.

There were 3,745 housing units, of which 10.1% were vacant. The homeowner vacancy rate was 2.0% and the rental vacancy rate was 8.6%.

Racial composition as of the 2020 census
Race	Number	Percent
White	7,305	91.9%
Black or African American	82	1.0%
American Indian and Alaska Native	18	0.2%
Asian	30	0.4%
Native Hawaiian and Other Pacific Islander	5	0.1%
Some other race	99	1.2%
Two or more races	408	5.1%
Hispanic or Latino (of any race)	221	2.8%

=== 2010 census ===
At the 2010 census, 8,262 people in 3,351 households, including 2,092 families, lived in the city. The population density was 1,836 persons per square mile (712.2/km^{2}). The 3,773 housing units had an average density of 838.4 per square mile (323.7/km^{2}). The racial makeup of the city was 96.2% White, 0.9% African American, 0.2% Native American, 0.3% Asian, 0.9% from other races, and 1.4% from two or more races. Hispanic or Latino people of any race were 0.90%.

Of the 3,351 households, 29.2% had children under 18 living with them, 40.1% were married couples living together, 6.6% had a male householder with no wife present, 15.8% had a female householder with no husband present, and 37.6% were not families. About 31.9% of households were one person and 14.3% were one person 65 or older. The average household size was 2.40, and the average family size was 2.97.

The age distribution was 28.1% under 20, 6.5% from 20 to 24, 25.1% from 25 to 44, 24.8% from 45 to 64, and 15.5% 65 or older. The median age was 37.2 years. For every 100 females, there were 88.8 males.

=== 2000 census ===
At the 2000 census, 8,336 people in 3,495 households, including 2,149 families, resided in the city. The population density was 1,860.6 inhabitants per square mile (718.4/km^{2}). The 3,795 housing units at an average density of 847.0 per square mile (327.0/km^{2}). The racial makeup of the city was 97.11% White, 0.91% African American, 0.28% Native American, 0.37% Asian, 0.32% from other races, and 1.01% from two or more races. Hispanic or Latino people of any race were 0.90%.

Of the 3,495 households, 29.9% had children under 18 living with them, 44.0% were married couples living together, 12.9% had a female householder with no husband present, and 38.5% were not families. About 33.4% of households were one person, and 15.3% were one person 65 or older. The average household size was 2.34, and the average family size was 2.95.

The age distribution was 25.5% under 18, 9.0% from 18 to 24, 28.3% from 25 to 44, 21.3% from 45 to 64, and 15.9% were 65 or older. The median age was 36 years. For every 100 females, there were 87.7 males. For every 100 females18 and over, there were 83.8 males.

The median household income was $29,065 and the median family income was $37,170. Males had a median income of $31,225 versus $19,413 for females. The per capita income for the city was $16,324. About 11.6% of families and 16.2% of the population were below the poverty line, including 19.0% of those under age 18 and 17.2% of those 65 or over.

== Arts and culture ==
The Hardin County Courthouse is a historical site in the center of the public square. Kenton has one public library, the Mary Lou Johnson Hardin County District Library, which was formerly located in a 1905 Carnegie library. The city's Hardin County Historical Museum is located in a near north side historic district.

== Parks and recreation ==
The city offers camping and fishing at Saulisberry Park located west of Kenton on Ohio State Route 67.

== Education ==
Kenton is home to the Kenton City School District, which includes an elementary school, Kenton Middle School, and Kenton High School, with the nickname the "Wildcats". The Wildcat football team won consecutive state championships in 2001 and 2002 in division IV, was a runner-up in 2011 in Division IV, and as a runner-up in 2003 in Division III.

== Media ==
Two media outlets operate in Kenton: WKTN, a radio station, and The Kenton Times, a daily newspaper.

== Infrastructure ==
=== Transportation ===
The Hardin County Airport is located three nautical miles (3.5 mi; 5.6 km) southwest of Kenton's central business district.

== Notable people ==
- John R. Goodin, Democratic congressman from Kansas
- William Lawrence, Republican congressman
- Fred Machetanz, writer, artist
- Jacob Parrott, first recipient of the Medal of Honor
- Paul Robinson, creator of the long-running Etta Kett comic strip for King Features Syndicate
- Luther M. Strong, US representative from Ohio
- Walt Slagle, American Baseball Pitcher
