= Jacob Parrott =

United States Army Medal of Honor recipient

Jacob Wilson Parrott
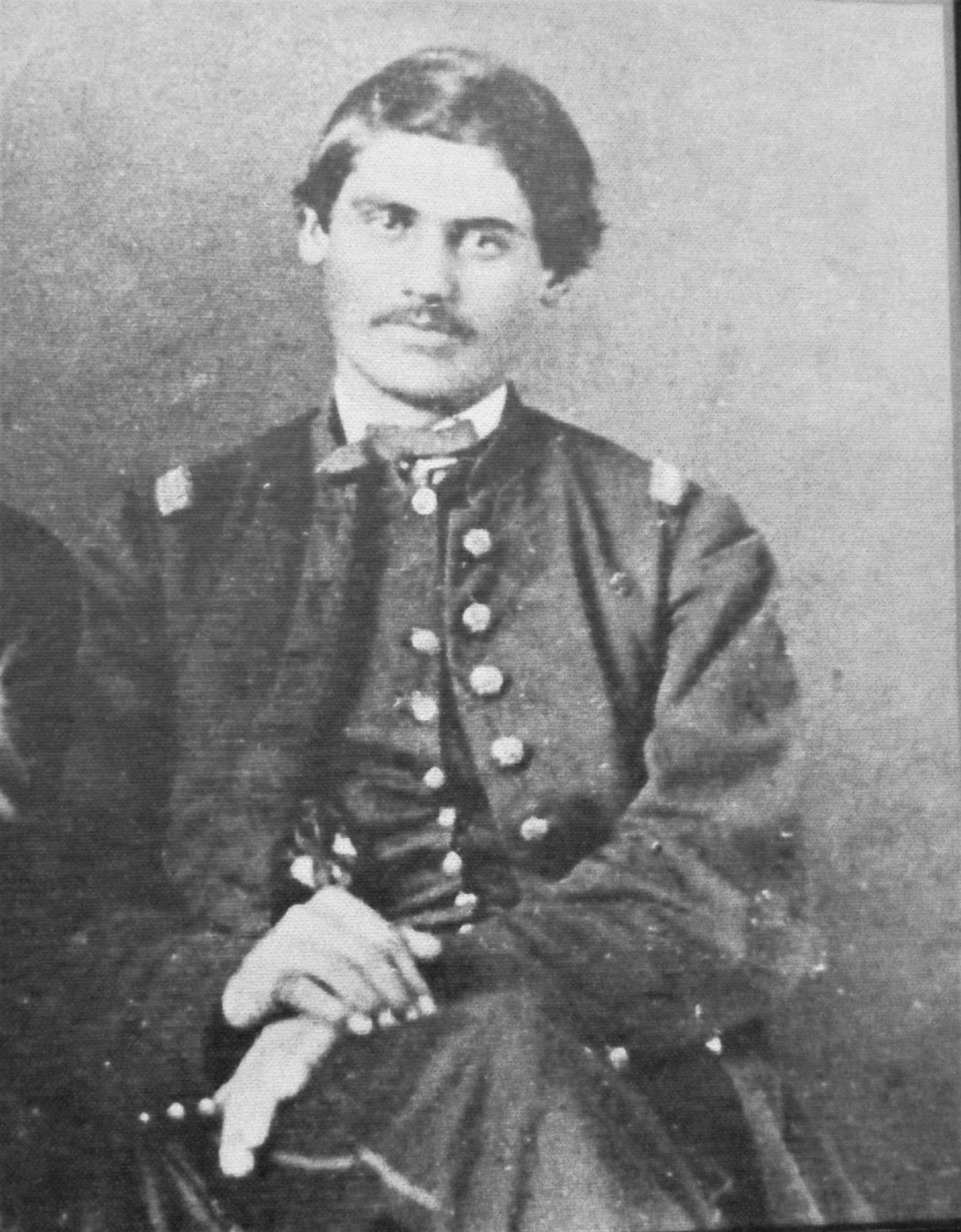
- Parrot c. 1860s
- Born: July 17, 1843; Fairfield County, Ohio, U.S.
- Died: December 22, 1908 (aged 65); Kenton, Ohio, U.S.
- Burial place: Grove Cemetery Kenton, Ohio
- Military career
- Allegiance: United States of America
- Branch: United States Army Union Army (POW)
- Service years: 1861–1865
- Rank: 1st Lieutenant
- Units: Company K, 33rd Ohio Infantry
- Conflicts: American Civil War
- Awards: Medal of Honor

Jacob Wilson Parrott (July 17, 1843 – December 22, 1908) was an American soldier and carpenter. He was the first recipient of the Medal of Honor, a new military award first presented by the United States Department of War to six Union Army soldiers who participated in the Great Locomotive Chase in 1862 during the American Civil War (1861–1865).

== Biography ==
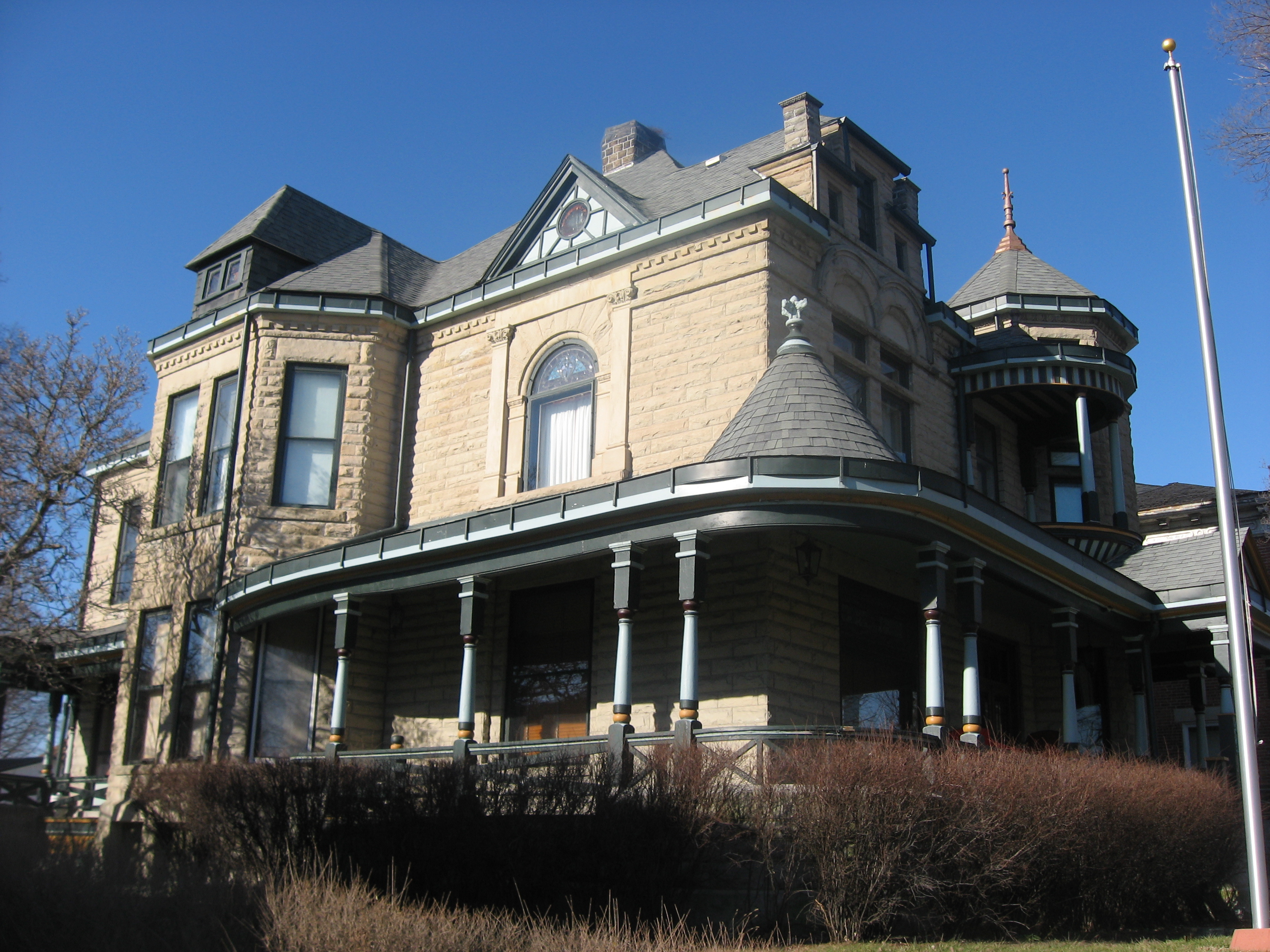
A museum to Parrott in Kenton

Parrott was a native of Fairfield County, Ohio. He joined the United States Army in 1861 as a private in Company K, 33rd Ohio Infantry and first saw combat in the Battle of Ivy Mountain. In April 1862, he volunteered to take part in a daring raid with 21 others (later known as "Andrews' Raiders" because they operated under the command of James J. Andrews). After infiltrating Confederate lines and hijacking the locomotive "General," they were captured and imprisoned. Parrott was severely beaten 110 times in an attempt to make him talk. Parrott and 14 others managed to escape, but only six of them reached friendly lines. He was later exchanged and taken to Washington, D.C. meeting President Abraham Lincoln and was presented with the Medal of Honor by Secretary of War Edwin M. Stanton. He served with the Union Army for the remainder of the war. He was commissioned as a second lieutenant in 1863 after the Battle of Stones River and as a first lieutenant in 1864.

He returned to Kenton, Ohio after the war and remained a cabinet maker and operated a stone quarry south of Kenton, Ohio. Parrott suffered a heart attack and died on December 22, 1908, while walking home from the county courthouse in Kenton, Ohio. He is buried in Grove Cemetery, which is located on the eastern edge of Kenton on the corner of Ohio State Route 309 and the road that now bears his name: Jacob Parrott Boulevard.

== Medal of Honor citation ==

Jacob Wilson Parrott
Rank and Organization: Private, Company K, 33d Ohio Infantry.
Place and date: Georgia, April 1862.
Entered service at: Hardin County, Ohio.
Birth: July 17, 1843, Fairfield County, Ohio.
Date of issue: March 25, 1863.

Citation:

One of the 19 of 22 men (including 2 civilians) who, by direction of Gen. Mitchell (or Buell) penetrated nearly 200 miles south into enemy territory and captured a railroad train at Big Shanty, Ga., in an attempt to destroy the bridges and tracks between Chattanooga and Atlanta.

== See also ==
- List of American Civil War Medal of Honor recipients: M–P
- List of Andrews Raiders
