= Mount Victory Historic District =

Historic district in Ohio, United States

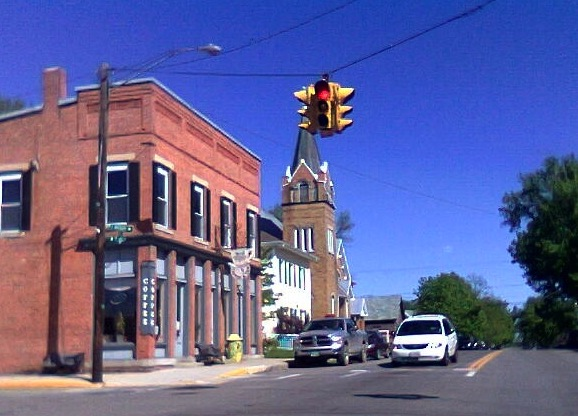
Main Street, Mount Victory

The Mount Victory Historic District is a historic site in Mount Victory Ohio, USA. It was listed on the National Register of Historic Places in 2001.

The district has buildings dating back to the period from the late 19th century to the mid-20th century. It also contains a railroad line, with a small-scale commercial district. Most buildings feature simple design. Two exceptions include the "Park Place" (c. 1872) built in an Italianate design for a local merchant, and the Methodist Episcopal Church (1903), built in a Romanesque Revival style.
