= Paul Franklin Clark =

American bacteriologist and virologist

Paul Franklin Clark (March 9, 1882, Portland, Maine – August 23, 1983, Livermore, California) was an American bacteriologist and virologist. He was the president of the American Society for Microbiology in 1938.

== Biography ==
Clark graduated from the Portland Maine, High School in 1900. At Brown University, he graduated with a bachelor's degree in 1904, a master's degree in 1905, and a Ph.D. in bacteriology in 1909. His Ph.D. thesis is entitled The relation of the pseudodiphtheria and the diphtheria bacillus. At Brown University, he worked as an assistant in zoology from 1904 to 1905 and as an assistant in bacteriology from 1905 to 1906. During his years of study for the Ph.D., he also worked from 1906 to 1907 as an assistant bacteriologist for Rhode Island's State Board of Health.

In the department of bacteriology of the Rockefeller Institute for Medical Research (now named Rockefeller University), Clark was a fellow from 1909 to 1910, an assistant from 1910 to 1912, and an associate from 1912 to 1914. In the department of bacteriology of the University of Wisconsin School of Medicine and Public Health, he was an associate professor from 1914 to 1918 and a full professor from 1918 to 1946, as well as chair of the department from 1918 to 1946. He was a full professor in the department of microbiology from 1946 to 1952, when he retired as professor emeritus. From 1946 to 1948 he also chaired the department of microbiology.

From 1913 to 1914, he did postgraduate study at the Johns Hopkins School of Medicine. Near the end of WW I, he served as a consulting bacteriologist for the Chemical Warfare Service of the U.S. Army. In 1923 he had a sabbatical year of study at the Institut Pasteur in Brussels and at the Molteno Institute for Research in Parasitology at the University of Cambridge, UK.

Clark did important research on poliomyelitis. He was elected in 1921 a Fellow of the American Association for the Advancement of Science.

In 1911 he married Alice Elizabeth Schiedt (1881–1980). They had three daughters (one of whom died in infancy) and a son.

== Selected publications ==
=== Articles ===
- Flexner, Simon; Clark, Paul F.; Fraser, Francis R. (1913). "Epidemic Poliomyelitis". Journal of the American Medical Association. 60 (3): 201. doi:10.1001/jama.1913.04340030031014.
- Clark, Paul F.; Amoss, Harold L. (1914). "Intraspinous Infection in Experimental Poliomyelitis". Journal of Experimental Medicine. 19 (2): 217–222. doi:10.1084/jem.19.2.217. PMC 2125148. PMID 19867761.
- Pettibone, Dorothy F.; Bogart, Franklin B.; Clark, Paul F. (1916). "The Bacteriology of the Bubble Fountain". Journal of Bacteriology. 1 (5): 471–480. doi:10.1128/jb.1.5.471-480.1916. PMC 378669. PMID 16558708.
- Clark, Paul F.; Ruehl, W. H. (1919). "Morphological Changes During the Growth of Bacteria". Journal of Bacteriology. 4 (6): 615–629. doi:10.1128/jb.4.6.615-629.1919. PMC 378828. PMID 16558857.
- Clark, Paul F.; Zellmer, C. E.; Stone, H. W. (1922). "Observations in Nonspecific Immunity". The Journal of Infectious Diseases. 31 (3): 215–225. doi:10.1093/infdis/31.3.215. JSTOR 30082233.
- Clark, Paul F.; Schindler, John; Roberts, David J. (1930). "Some Properties of Poliomyelitis Virus". Journal of Bacteriology. 20 (3): 213–233. doi:10.1128/jb.20.3.213-233.1930. PMC 375117. PMID 16559455.
- Clark, Paul F. (1938). "Alice in Virusland". Journal of Bacteriology. 36 (3): 223–241. doi:10.1128/jb.36.3.223-241.1938. PMC 545356. PMID 16560156.
- Waisman, Harry A.; Rasmussen, A. F.; Elvehjem, C. A.; Clark, Paul F. (1943). "Studies on the Nutritional Requirements of the Rhesus Monkey". The Journal of Nutrition. 26 (2): 205–218. doi:10.1093/jn/26.2.205.
- Lichstein, Herman C.; McCall, K. B.; Elvehjem, C. A.; Clark, P. F. (1946). "The Influence of "Folic Acid" Deficiency in Macaca mulatta on Susceptibility to Experimental Poliomyelitis". Journal of Bacteriology. 52: 105–110. doi:10.1128/jb.52.1.105-110.1946. PMC 518144. PMID 20994875.
- Harmon, Doralea R.; Zarafonetis, Christine; Clark, Paul F. (1946). "Temperature Relations in Phagocytosis". Journal of Bacteriology. 52 (3): 337–347. doi:10.1128/jb.52.3.337-347.1946. PMC 518189. PMID 20998723. S2CID 10066912.
- Cooperman, J. M.; Lichstein, H. C.; Clark, P. F.; Elvehjem, C. A. (1946). "The Influence of Thiamine on the Susceptibility of Chicks to Avian Encephalomyelitis". Journal of Bacteriology. 52 (4): 467–470. doi:10.1128/jb.52.4.467-470.1946. PMC 518213. PMID 20274675. S2CID 31444181.
- Gershoff, S. N.; Rasmussen, A. F.; Elvehjem, C. A.; Clark, P. F. (1952). "Effect of Amino Acid Imbalance on Course of Lansing Poliomyelitis in Mice". Experimental Biology and Medicine. 81 (2): 484–486. doi:10.3181/00379727-81-19917. PMID 13027346. S2CID 19285108.
- Rasmussen, A. F.; Weaver, R. W.; Elvehjem, C. A.; Clark, P. F. (1953). "Influence of Low Tryptophan Diets Containing 6-Methyltryptophan on Oral Infection with Poliomyelitis Virus". Experimental Biology and Medicine. 84 (2): 306–308. doi:10.3181/00379727-84-20627. PMID 13121022. S2CID 26676632.

=== Books ===
- Clark, Paul F.; Clark, Edith Schiedt (1942). Memorable days in medicine, a calendar of biology and medicine. Madison: The University of Wisconsin Press.
- Clark, P. F. (1961). Pioneer microbiologists of America. Madison: University of Wisconsin Press. ASIN B0924Q2XXF. Clark, Paul Franklin (June 2012). 2012 pbk reprint. Literary Licensing, LLC. ISBN 978-1258422226.
- Clark, P. F. (1967). The University of Wisconsin Medical School: a chronicle, 1848-1948. 1967: Published for the Wisconsin Medical Alumni Association by Wisconsin University Press.

== Sources ==
- Robert Cecil Cook (ed.): Who's who in American Education: A Biographical Dictionary of Eminent Living Educators of the United States, volume III, Who's Who in American Education, Nashville, Tenn., 1934, p. 154.
- Library of Congress, American Library Association. Resources and Technical Services Division: National Union Catalog: A Cumulative Author List Representing Library of Congress Printed Cards and Titles Reported by Other American Libraries, volume XIX, Library of Congress, Ann Arbor, Mich., 1968, p. 162.
- ASM News, volume 50, American Society for Microbiology, Ann Arbor Michigan, 1984, p. 104.
