= Hardin County Courthouse (Ohio) =

Local government building in the United States

- U.S. National Register of Historic Places
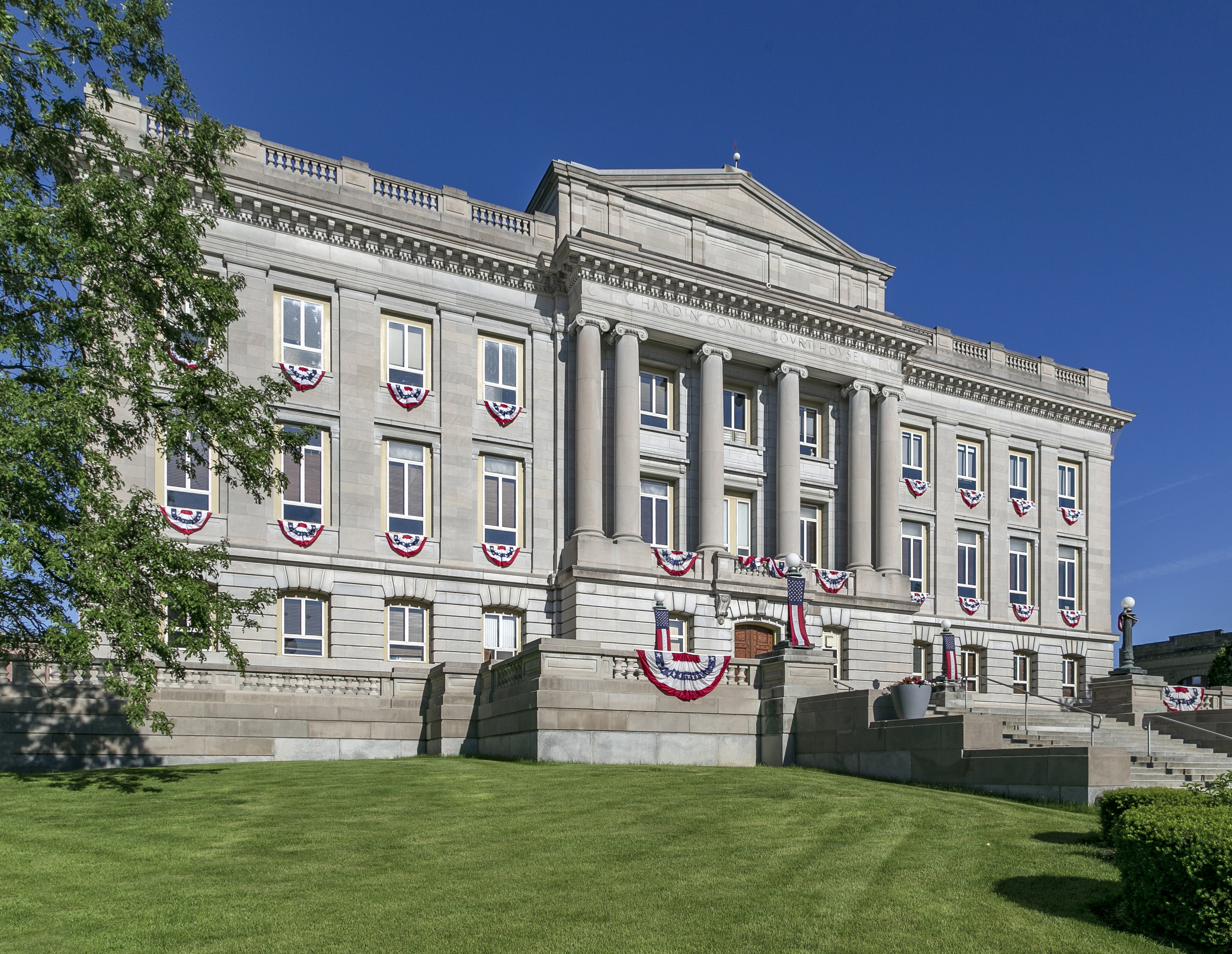
- Facade of the Hardin County Courthouse

- Location within Ohio Location within the United States
- Location: Kenton, Ohio
- Coordinates: 40°38′50″N 83°36′32″W
- Area: 2 acres (0.81 ha)
- Built: 1913
- Architect: Richards, McCarty & Bulford
- Architectural style: Neoclassical
- NRHP reference No.: 79001863
- Added to NRHP: March 21, 1979

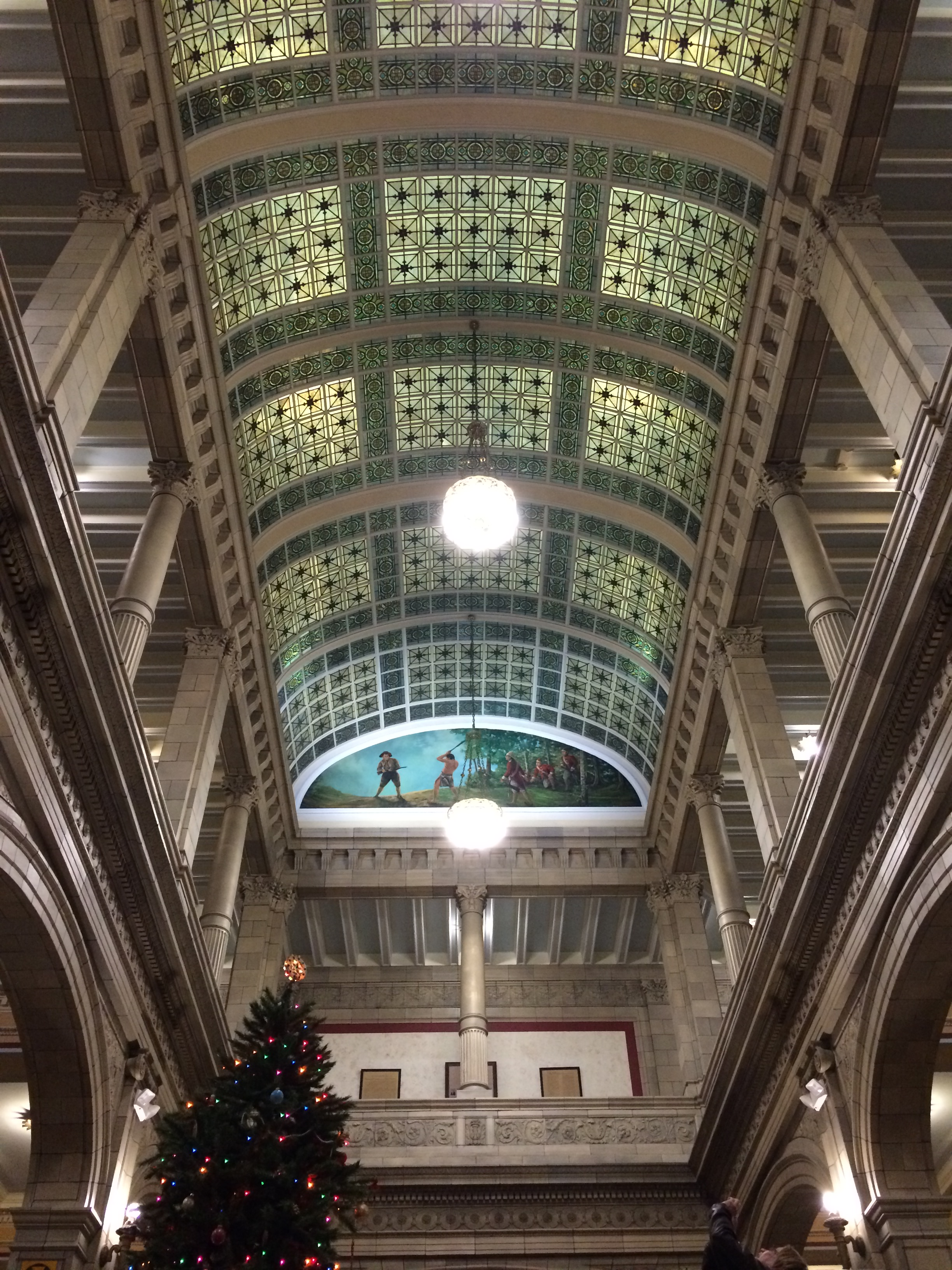
Skylight in the Hardin County Courthouse

The Hardin County Courthouse is one of Ohio's courthouses. Located in Kenton, Ohio, United States, it was completed in 1915 at a cost of $275,000. The building was added to the National Register of Historic Places on March 21, 1979, and a state historical marker was placed on the courthouse lawn in 1996.

The present courthouse is the third structure to occupy the middle of the city's central square; it replaced an 1880 building, which in turn replaced a structure erected in 1834. It is doubly symmetrical, with the northern and western sides being identical to the southern and eastern sides respectively. Architectural historians have ranked it as a fine example of neoclassical architecture, with elements such as pilasters topped with Doric capitals and walls of dressed stone. The northern and southern sides are divided into seven bays, while four bays are placed on each side of a central colonnade topped with pediments. The building is two stories tall with a ground floor substantially elevated above the surface of the ground. Lit by a skylight with stained glass, the interior features multiple murals and chandeliers made of brasswork. Granite was used to build the curbs surrounding the courthouse square, as well as the building's steps, while the walls themselves are built of grey Indiana Limestone.
