= Kenton Public Library =

- U.S. National Register of Historic Places
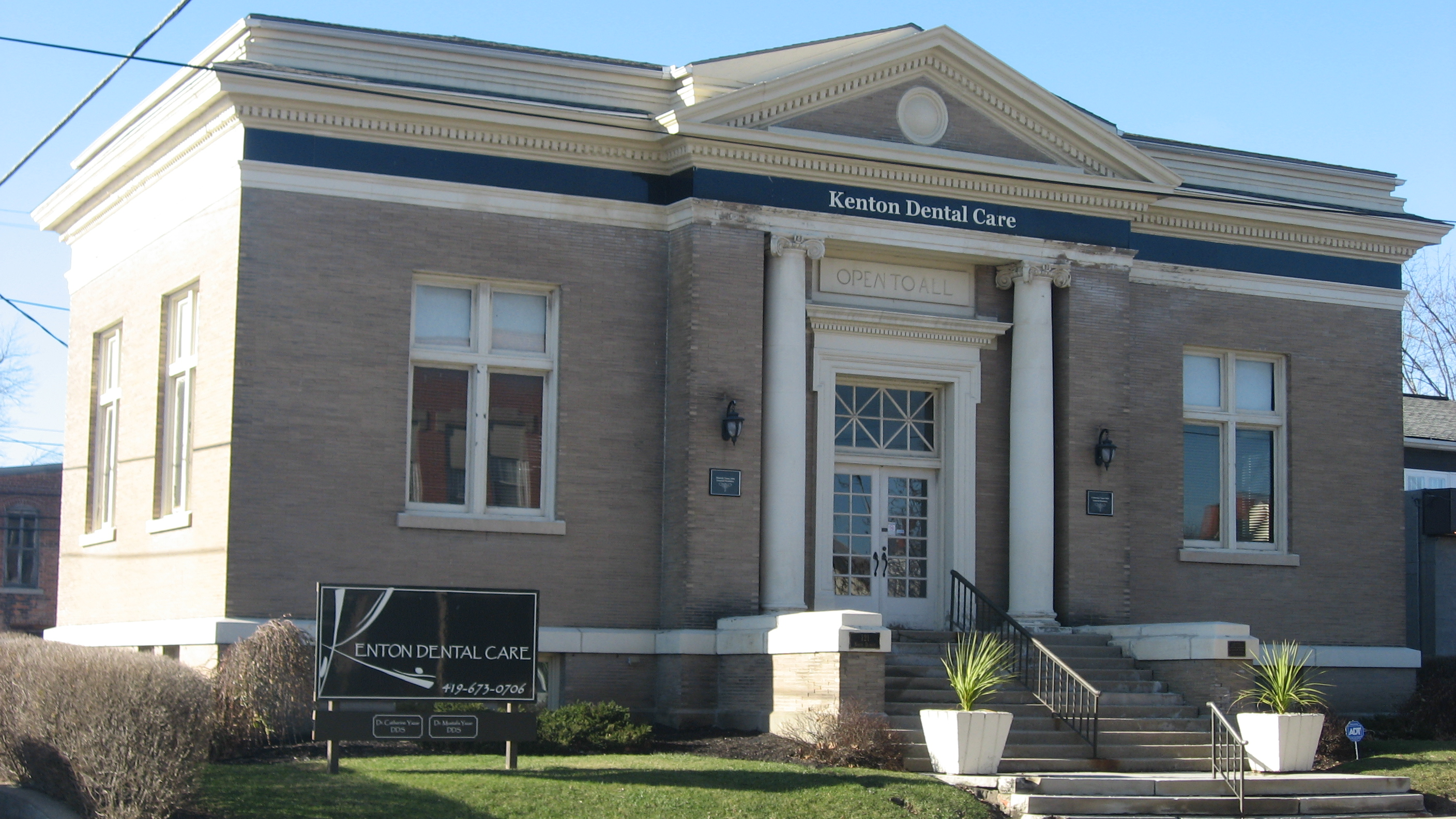
- Front of the former library building

- Location within Ohio Location within the United States
- Location: 121 N. Detroit St., Kenton, Ohio
- Coordinates: 40°38′54″N 83°36′35″W
- Area: 0.3 acres (0.12 ha)
- Built: 1905
- Architect: Richards, McCarty and Bulford
- NRHP reference No.: 83004311
- Added to NRHP: December 29, 1983

The Kenton Public Library is a historic building in downtown Kenton, Ohio, United States. One of 109 Carnegie libraries in Ohio, it was designed in 1905 by the architectural firm of Richards, McCarty and Bulford; Carnegie donated $20,000 to aid in its construction. An attempt to start a library in Kenton began in 1853, but over thirty years passed before one was actually begun. From 1886 to the opening of the Carnegie library, the library was housed in a business block on the city's central square. The library building is a one-and-one-half-story brick structure. An elevated foundation supports the rectangular structure, which is accessed from the street by a staircase.

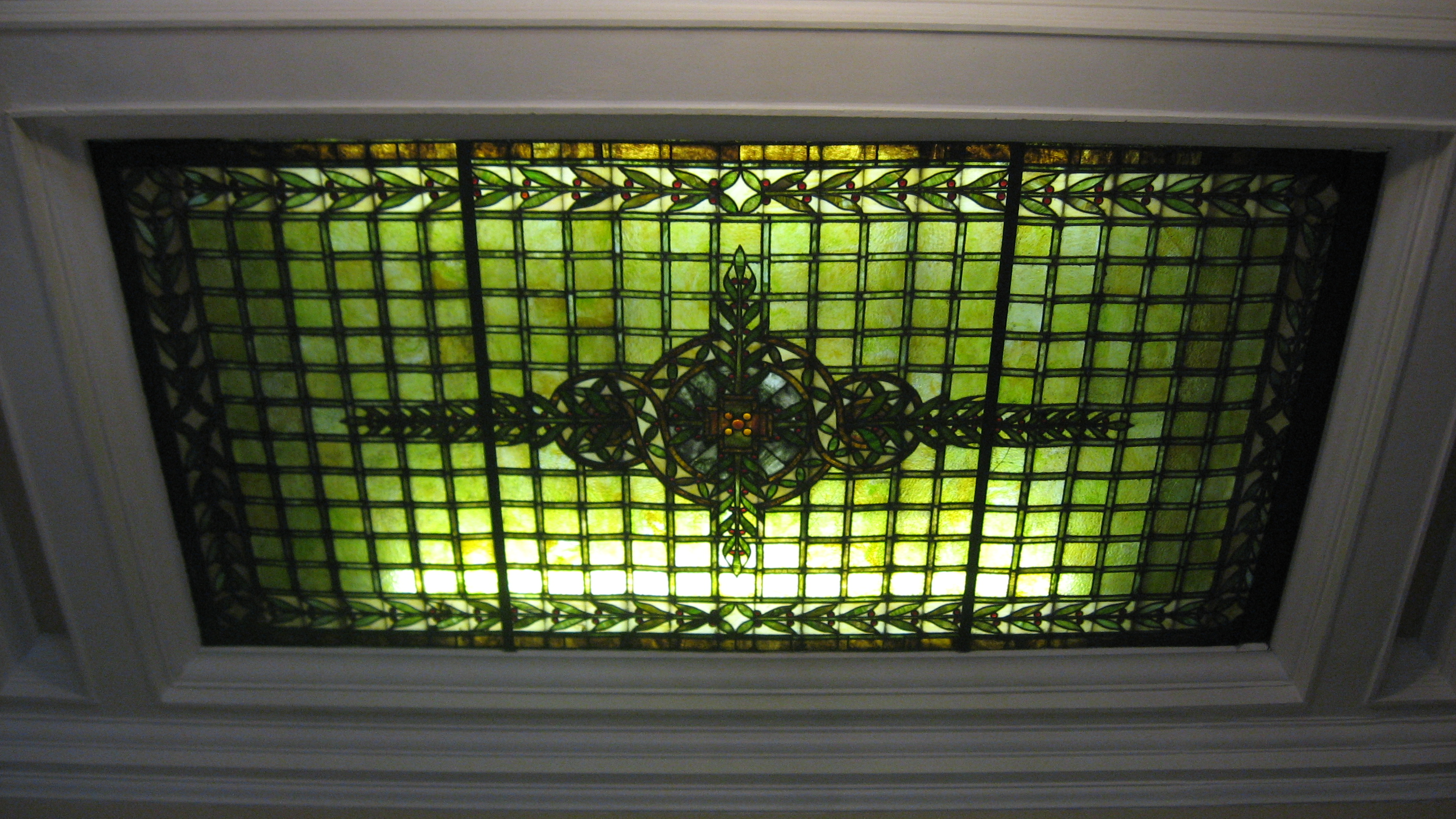
Interior skylight

With the opening of the library to all Hardin County residents in 1936 and the expansion of the city in general, the old facility had become too small for its patrons by the 1960s. After successful fundraising efforts and negotiations with the city school board, the old high school (previously superseded by the present high school building) was purchased and demolished, and the new library opened at the site. Today, the Carnegie library is occupied by a dentistry practice, Kenton Dental Care, and local residents are served by the Mary Lou Johnson Library.

In 1983, the Kenton Public Library was listed on the National Register of Historic Places for its place as an example of library building in Ohio, its connection to Andrew Carnegie, and its well-preserved architecture.
