= National Register of Historic Places listings in Mecklenburg County, North Carolina =

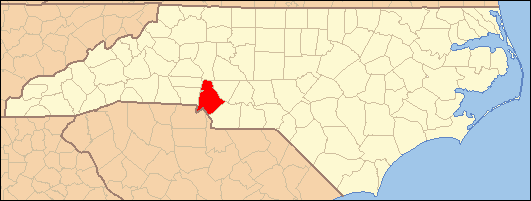

This list includes properties and districts listed on the National Register of Historic Places in Mecklenburg County, North Carolina. Click the "Map of all coordinates" link to the right to view an online map of all properties and districts with latitude and longitude coordinates in the table below.

== Current listings ==
This National Park Service list is complete through NPS recent listings posted August 7, 2026.

	Name on the Register	Image	Date listed	Location	City or town	Description
1	Addison Apartments	Addison Apartments	August 23, 1990 (#90001314)	831 E. Morehead St. 35°12′50″N 80°50′41″W	Charlotte	
2	Hezekiah Alexander House	Hezekiah Alexander House	April 17, 1970 (#70000461)	3500 Shamrock Dr. 35°13′55″N 80°46′00″W	Charlotte	
3	Neal Somers Alexander House	Neal Somers Alexander House	May 7, 2008 (#08000381)	5014 N. Sharon Amity Rd. 35°13′38″N 80°44′49″W	Charlotte	
4	William T. Alexander House	William T. Alexander House	January 15, 2003 (#02001718)	Mallard Creek Church Rd., 0.1 miles west of its junction with U.S. Route 29; 35°19′23″N 80°44′05″W	Charlotte	
5	Barringer Hotel	Barringer Hotel	August 29, 2011 (#11000637)	426 N. Tryon St. 35°13′48″N 80°50′19″W	Charlotte	Demolished in 2022
6	Beaver Dam Plantation House	Beaver Dam Plantation House	March 19, 1979 (#79001735)	Southeast of Davidson on NC 73; 35°28′32″N 80°49′04″W	Davidson	
7	Biddle Memorial Hall, Johnson C. Smith University	Biddle Memorial Hall, Johnson C. Smith University	October 14, 1975 (#75001281)	Beatties Ford Rd. and W. Trade St. 35°14′36″N 80°51′26″W	Charlotte	
8	Billingsville School	Billingsville School	November 12, 1999 (#99001366)	3100 Leroy St. 35°11′46″N 80°48′30″W	Charlotte	
9	Chairman Blake House	Chairman Blake House	August 25, 2004 (#04000905)	318 Chairman Blake Ln. 35°29′52″N 80°50′54″W	Davidson	
10	James A. Blakeney House	James A. Blakeney House	June 18, 1998 (#98000706)	Western side of NC 3629, ½ mile south of the NC 3626 junction 35°02′24″N 80°49′05″W	Providence	
11	Philip Carey Building	Philip Carey Building	March 1, 1984 (#84002408)	301 E. 7th St. 35°13′39″N 80°50′23″W	Charlotte	
12	Carolina School Supply Company Building (Former)	Carolina School Supply Company Building (Former)	April 12, 2001 (#01000374)	1023 W. Morehead St. 35°13′41″N 80°51′38″W	Charlotte	
13	Carolina Transfer and Storage Company Building, (Former)	Carolina Transfer and Storage Company Building, (Former)	November 30, 1999 (#99001447)	1230 W. Morehead St. 35°13′44″N 80°51′42″W	Charlotte	
14	John Price Carr House	John Price Carr House	October 22, 1980 (#80002885)	200-206 N. McDowell St. 35°13′16″N 80°50′00″W	Charlotte	
15	Cedar Grove	Cedar Grove	February 1, 1972 (#72000976)	3 miles west of Huntersville off U.S. Route 21; 35°23′40″N 80°53′55″W	Huntersville	
16	Charlotte Fire Station No. 4	Charlotte Fire Station No. 4	December 20, 2016 (#16000879)	420 W. 5th St. 35°13′52″N 80°50′44″W	Charlotte	
17	Charlotte Supply Company Building	Charlotte Supply Company Building	March 1, 1984 (#84002348)	500 S. Mint St. 35°13′35″N 80°51′02″W	Charlotte	Demolished June 1991
18	Commercial Building at 500 North Tryon Street	Commercial Building at 500 North Tryon Street	November 20, 1992 (#92001615)	500 N. Tryon St. 35°13′48″N 80°50′18″W	Charlotte	
19	Crane Company Building (Former)	Crane Company Building (Former)	May 8, 2001 (#01000423)	1307 W. Morehead St. 35°13′42″N 80°51′50″W	Charlotte	
20	Dr. Walter Pharr Craven House		January 31, 1991 (#90002187)	7648 Mt. Holly-Huntersville Rd. 35°20′47″N 80°53′47″W	Charlotte	
21	Croft Historic District	Croft Historic District	June 10, 1999 (#99000699)	Junction of NC 115 and NC 2483; 35°20′44″N 80°49′23″W	Charlotte	
22	Benjamin W. Davidson House		April 26, 1976 (#76001331)	West of Huntersville on NC 2138; 35°23′45″N 80°52′34″W	Huntersville	
23	Davidson Historic District	Davidson Historic District	June 1, 2009 (#09000381)	Bounded by N. Main and Beaty Sts., Catawba Ave., Mocks and Concord Rds., Pat Stough and Dogwood Lns., Davidson College; 35°29′58″N 80°50′55″W	Davidson	
24	Dilworth Historic District	Dilworth Historic District	April 9, 1987 (#87000610)	Roughly bounded by Myrtle, Morehead, Berkeley, Dilworth Rd., W., Charlotte, Park, Tremont, Cleveland and Renssalaer; also the eastern side of the 2000 block of Euclid Ave. and both sides of the 2000 block of Lyndhurst Ave. 35°12′28″N 80°51′00″W	Charlotte	Second set of boundaries represents a boundary increase of December 7, 2000
25	James Buchanan Duke House	James Buchanan Duke House	January 20, 1978 (#78001963)	400 Hermitage Rd. 35°12′05″N 80°49′39″W	Charlotte	
26	East Avenue Tabernacle Associate Reformed Presbyterian Church	East Avenue Tabernacle Associate Reformed Presbyterian Church	January 20, 2005 (#04001523)	927 Elizabeth St. 35°13′10″N 80°50′04″W	Charlotte	
27	Elizabeth Historic District	Elizabeth Historic District	January 3, 1989 (#88003003)	Roughly bounded by Central Ave., Seaboard Coast Line Railroad, E. 5th St., Kenmore Ave., Park Dr., and E. Independence; 35°12′51″N 80°49′05″W	Charlotte	
28	Ervin Building	Ervin Building	December 15, 2023 (#100009619)	4037 East Independence Boulevard; 35°12′01″N 80°46′21″W	Charlotte	
29	Eumenean Hall, Davidson College	Eumenean Hall, Davidson College	April 13, 1972 (#72000974)	Davidson College campus 35°30′00″N 80°50′51″W	Davidson	
30	John F. Ewart Farm		February 4, 1991 (#91000023)	12920 Huntersville-Concord Rd. 35°24′45″N 80°49′26″W	Huntersville	
31	Fire Station No. 2	Fire Station No. 2	October 22, 1980 (#80002886)	1212 South Blvd. 35°13′01″N 80°51′06″W	Charlotte	
32	First Presbyterian Church	First Presbyterian Church	November 12, 1982 (#82001300)	200 W. Trade St. 35°13′44″N 80°50′38″W	Charlotte	
33	Former Charlotte Coca-Cola Bottling Company Plant	Former Charlotte Coca-Cola Bottling Company Plant	February 26, 1998 (#98000157)	1401–1409 W. Morehead St. 35°13′43″N 80°51′52″W	Charlotte	
34	Former Nebel Knitting Mill	Former Nebel Knitting Mill	September 5, 1991 (#91001376)	101 W. Worthington Ave. 35°12′41″N 80°51′38″W	Charlotte	
35	Former Parks-Cramer Company Complex	Former Parks-Cramer Company Complex	March 7, 1994 (#94000146)	2000 South Boulevard; 35°12′35″N 80°51′40″W	Charlotte	
36	Former Thrift Mill	Former Thrift Mill	August 26, 1994 (#94001049)	8300 Moore's Chapel Rd. 35°16′37″N 80°56′40″W	Charlotte	
37	Former Daniel A. Tompkins Company Machine Shop	Former Daniel A. Tompkins Company Machine Shop	May 8, 2001 (#01000422)	1900 South Boulevard; 35°12′39″N 80°51′36″W	Charlotte	
38	Frederick Apartments	Frederick Apartments	April 5, 2001 (#01000341)	515 N. Church St. 35°13′54″N 80°50′22″W	Charlotte	
39	Thomas and Latitia Gluyas House		July 11, 2001 (#01000725)	7314 Mount Holly-Huntersville Rd. 35°20′39″N 80°54′03″W	Huntersville	
40	Grace A.M.E. Zion Church	Grace A.M.E. Zion Church	May 15, 2008 (#08000412)	219-223 S. Brevard St. 35°13′24″N 80°50′31″W	Charlotte	
41	Sidney and Ethel Grier House	Sidney and Ethel Grier House	August 23, 2006 (#06000724)	4747 Grier Farm Ln. 35°03′44″N 80°45′44″W	Charlotte	
42	Grier-Rea House	Grier-Rea House	August 30, 2010 (#10000603)	6701 Providence Rd. 35°07′02″N 80°46′46″W	Charlotte	
43	Grinnell Company-General Fire Extinguisher Company Complex	Grinnell Company-General Fire Extinguisher Company Complex	December 10, 2003 (#03001275)	1431 W. Morehead St. 35°13′42″N 80°52′00″W	Charlotte	
44	Hayes-Byrum Store and House	Hayes-Byrum Store and House	January 31, 1991 (#90002186)	NC 160 south of its junction with Shopton Rd. 35°10′12″N 80°57′48″W	Charlotte	
45	Highland Park Manufacturing Company Mill No. 3	Highland Park Manufacturing Company Mill No. 3	October 20, 1988 (#88001855)	2901 N. Davidson St. 35°14′44″N 80°48′35″W	Charlotte	
46	Highland Park Mill No. 1	Highland Park Mill No. 1	September 18, 2017 (#100001632)	340 E. 16th St. 35°14′06″N 80°49′36″W	Charlotte	
47	Eugene Wilson Hodges Farm		February 21, 1991 (#91000077)	2900 Rocky River Church Rd. 35°16′21″N 80°42′17″W	Charlotte	
48	Holly Bend		March 24, 1972 (#72000977)	West of Huntersville on NC 2720; 35°23′03″N 80°57′51″W	Huntersville	
49	Home Federal Building	Home Federal Building	January 30, 2008 (#07001499)	139 S. Tryon St. 35°13′35″N 80°50′37″W	Charlotte	Bank building converted to condos
50	Hopewell Presbyterian Church and Cemetery	Hopewell Presbyterian Church and Cemetery	March 1, 1996 (#96000198)	10500 Beatties Ford Rd. 35°21′55″N 80°53′54″W	Huntersville	
51	Hoskins Mill		October 5, 1988 (#88001702)	201 S. Hoskins Rd. 35°15′49″N 80°53′11″W	Charlotte	
52	Hotel Charlotte		July 2, 1979 (#79003344)	327 W. Trade St. 35°13′43″N 80°50′44″W	Charlotte	Demolished November 6, 1988
53	Huntersville Colored High School		August 20, 2009 (#09000636)	302 Holbrooks Rd. 35°23′54″N 80°50′09″W	Huntersville	
54	Independence Building	Independence Building	September 18, 1978 (#78001964)	100-102 W. Trade St. 35°13′39″N 80°50′35″W	Charlotte	Demolished September 1981
55	Ingleside		December 15, 2020 (#100005958)	7225 Bud Henderson Rd. 35°24′08″N 80°54′53″W	Huntersville	
56	Johnston Building	Johnston Building	August 12, 2025 (#100012112)	212 S. Tryon Street; 35°13′34″N 80°50′41″W	Charlotte	
57	Charles R. Jonas Federal Building	Charles R. Jonas Federal Building	June 7, 1978 (#78001965)	401 W. Trade St. 35°13′49″N 80°50′49″W	Charlotte	
58	Hamilton C. Jones III House	Hamilton C. Jones III House	May 2, 2002 (#02000439)	201 Cherokee Rd. 35°12′05″N 80°49′18″W	Charlotte	
59	Bishop John C. Kilgo House	Bishop John C. Kilgo House	January 22, 2009 (#08001364)	2100 The Plaza; 35°13′49″N 80°48′29″W	Charlotte	
60	Kimberlee Apartments		July 27, 2022 (#100007968)	1300 Reece Rd. 35°10′33″N 80°50′52″W	Charlotte	
61	Latta Arcade	Latta Arcade	October 29, 1975 (#75001282)	320 S. Tryon St. 35°13′32″N 80°50′45″W	Charlotte	An indoor shopping arcade with a glass skylight
62	Latta House	Latta House	March 16, 1972 (#72000978)	6 miles south of Huntersville on NC 2125; 35°21′16″N 80°55′53″W	Huntersville	
63	Elizabeth Lawrence House and Garden	Elizabeth Lawrence House and Garden	September 14, 2006 (#06000866)	348 Ridgewood Ave. 35°10′48″N 80°50′36″W	Charlotte	
64	Liddell-McNinch House	Liddell-McNinch House	December 12, 1976 (#76001330)	511 N. Church St. 35°13′53″N 80°50′23″W	Charlotte	
65	Louise Cotton Mill		December 31, 2013 (#13001027)	1101 Hawthorne Ln. 35°13′29″N 80°49′06″W	Charlotte	
66	Matthews Commercial Historic District	Matthews Commercial Historic District	August 22, 1996 (#96000928)	157-195 and 156-196 N. Trade St., 118 E. Charles St. 35°06′59″N 80°43′20″W	Matthews	
67	Mayes House	Mayes House	August 5, 1993 (#93000735)	435 E. Morehead St. 35°11′26″N 80°50′54″W	Charlotte	
68	Albert McCoy Farm	Albert McCoy Farm	November 2, 2000 (#00001291)	10401 McCoy Rd. 35°22′01″N 80°53′10″W	Huntersville	
69	Samuel J. McElroy House	Samuel J. McElroy House	February 21, 1991 (#91000078)	10915 Beatties Ford Rd. 35°22′11″N 80°54′09″W	Huntersville	
70	John Washington McKinney House		February 21, 1991 (#91000079)	7332 Providence Rd. W. 35°03′39″N 80°48′17″W	Charlotte	Destroyed
71	Frank Ramsay McNinch House		June 3, 1999 (#99000670)	2727 Sharon Ln. 35°09′39″N 80°49′09″W	Charlotte	
72	McCrorey Heights Historic District		May 26, 2026 (#100013060)	Roughly bounded by Interstate 77, Oaklawn Avenue, Fairmont Street, and Brookshire Freeway/NC-16; 35°15′08″N 80°51′17″W	Charlotte	
73	Mecklenburg County Courthouse	Mecklenburg County Courthouse	May 10, 1979 (#79001734)	E. Trade, Alexander, and E. 4th Sts. 35°13′16″N 80°50′15″W	Charlotte	
74	Mecklenburg Investment Company Building	Mecklenburg Investment Company Building	August 19, 1982 (#82003486)	233 S. Brevard St. 35°13′22″N 80°50′32″W	Charlotte	
75	Merchants and Farmers National Bank Building		March 1, 1984 (#84002344)	123 E. Trade St. 35°13′36″N 80°50′32″W	Charlotte	Demolished
76	Green Morris Farm		February 21, 1991 (#91000080)	Western side of NC 3628, approximately 1 mile south of its junction with Providence Rd. W. 35°02′56″N 80°47′56″W	Charlotte	Destroyed
77	Morrocroft	Morrocroft	November 28, 1983 (#83003970)	2525 Richardson Dr. 35°09′35″N 80°49′22″W	Charlotte	
78	Myers Park Historic District	Myers Park Historic District	August 10, 1987 (#87000655)	Roughly bounded by NC 16, E. and W. Queens Rd., and Lillington Ave. 35°11′33″N 80°49′59″W	Charlotte	
79	North Charlotte Historic District	North Charlotte Historic District	March 16, 1990 (#90000367)	Roughly bounded by the Southern Railroad, Herrin St., Spencer St., and Charles Ave. 35°14′44″N 80°48′19″W	Charlotte	
80	Oaklawn Park Historic District		May 26, 2026 (#100013055)	Roughly bounded by Interstate 77, Waddell Street Park. Oaklawn Cemetery, Mulberry Avenue. and Russell Avenue; 35°15′21″N 80°50′48″W	Charlotte	
81	Orient Manufacturing Company-Chadwick-Hoskins No. 3	Orient Manufacturing Company-Chadwick-Hoskins No. 3	August 15, 2006 (#06000721)	311 E. 12th St. 35°12′12″N 80°49′53″W	Charlotte	
82	R.F. Outen Pottery	R.F. Outen Pottery	April 24, 2015 (#15000183)	430 Jefferson St. 35°06′54″N 80°43′44″W	Matthews	
83	Overcarsh House	Overcarsh House	July 21, 1983 (#83001896)	326 W. 8th St. 35°13′58″N 80°50′30″W	Charlotte	
84	Palmer Fire School	Palmer Fire School	August 25, 2004 (#04000906)	2601 E. 7th St. 35°12′21″N 80°48′37″W	Charlotte	
85	Pharrsdale Historic District	Pharrsdale Historic District	February 20, 2002 (#02000057)	Bounded by Biltmore Dr. Cherokee Rd., Providence Rd. and Scotland Ave. 35°11′28″N 80°49′20″W	Charlotte	
86	Philanthropic Hall, Davidson College	Philanthropic Hall, Davidson College	April 13, 1972 (#72000975)	Davidson College campus 35°29′57″N 80°50′47″W	Davidson	
87	Pineville Commercial Historic District	Pineville Commercial Historic District	August 5, 2011 (#11000510)	310-333 Main St. and 105-109 Dover St. 35°05′09″N 80°53′29″W	Pineville	
88	Pineville Mill Village Historic District		August 8, 2011 (#11000511)	Roughly bounded by Dover, Price & Hill Sts., Lakeview Dr. & Eden Ct. 35°04′50″N 80°53′44″W	Pineville	
89	Potts Plantation	Potts Plantation	January 5, 1998 (#97001561)	South of Davidson and southwest of Cornelius, between NC 2693 and NC 115; 35°28′45″N 80°50′13″W	Cornelius	
90	Providence Presbyterian Church and Cemetery	Providence Presbyterian Church and Cemetery	June 1, 1982 (#82003487)	10140 Providence Rd. 35°04′11″N 80°46′18″W	Matthews	
91	Ramah Presbyterian Church and Cemetery		February 21, 1991 (#91000081)	NC 2439, 0.3 miles north of its junction with NC 2426; 35°26′22″N 80°48′10″W	Huntersville	
92	Robinson Rock House Ruin and Plantation Site	Robinson Rock House Ruin and Plantation Site	January 22, 2009 (#08001365)	Reedy Creek Park-2900 Rocky River Rd. 35°16′35″N 80°43′03″W	Charlotte	
93	Rosedale	Rosedale	September 11, 1972 (#72000973)	3427 N. Tryon St. 35°15′26″N 80°47′36″W	Charlotte	
94	Edward M. Rozzell House	Edward M. Rozzell House	January 20, 2005 (#04001530)	11647 Rozzelles Ferry Rd. 35°20′11″N 80°57′54″W	Charlotte	
95	Savona Mill	Savona Mill	December 2, 2014 (#14000989)	528 S. Turner St. 35°14′29″N 80°52′02″W	Charlotte	
96	Seaboard Air Line Railroad Passenger Station	Seaboard Air Line Railroad Passenger Station	October 24, 1980 (#80002887)	1000 N. Tryon St. 35°14′02″N 80°49′59″W	Charlotte	
97	Fritz Seifart House		December 20, 2006 (#06001141)	421 Hempstead Place; 35°12′02″N 80°48′56″W	Charlotte	
98	Siloam School	Siloam School	September 28, 2007 (#07001011)	Western side of Mallard Highlands Dr., approximately ¼ mile south of its junction with John Adams Rd. 35°20′10″N 80°44′20″W	Charlotte	
99	Southern Asbestos Company Mills	Southern Asbestos Company Mills	January 30, 2008 (#07001500)	1000 Seaboard St. 35°14′21″N 80°50′41″W	Charlotte	
100	Speas Vinegar Company	Speas Vinegar Company	August 12, 2015 (#15000530)	2921 N. Tryon St. 35°15′05″N 80°48′45″W	Charlotte	
101	St. Mark's Episcopal Church		March 1, 1984 (#84002410)	NC 2004; also the southern side of NC 2004 east of its junction with NC 2074; 35°20′52″N 80°52′51″W	Huntersville	Second location represents a boundary increase of February 21, 1991
102	Steele Creek Presbyterian Church and Cemetery	Steele Creek Presbyterian Church and Cemetery	February 21, 1991 (#91000082)	7407 Steele Creek Rd. 35°11′03″N 80°57′23″W	Charlotte	
103	Joseph Sykes Brothers Company Building	Joseph Sykes Brothers Company Building	May 1, 2003 (#03000343)	1445 S. Mint St. 35°13′09″N 80°51′38″W	Charlotte	
104	Textile Mill Supply Company Building	Textile Mill Supply Company Building	February 5, 1999 (#99000091)	1300 S. Mint St. 35°13′17″N 80°51′31″W	Charlotte	
105	Union Storage and Warehouse Company Building	Union Storage and Warehouse Company Building	January 11, 2001 (#00001640)	1000 W. Morehead St. 35°13′42″N 80°51′31″W	Charlotte	
106	VanLandingham Estate	VanLandingham Estate	October 13, 1983 (#83003971)	2010 The Plaza; 35°13′47″N 80°48′30″W	Charlotte	
107	Victoria	Victoria	April 11, 1973 (#73001359)	1600 The Plaza; 35°13′26″N 80°48′37″W	Charlotte	
108	Wesley Heights Historic District	Wesley Heights Historic District	November 29, 1995 (#95001397)	Bounded by W. Morehead St., Woodruff Pl., Lela Ave., CSX RR tracks, Tuckaseegee Rd., W. Trade St. and S. Summit Ave. 35°13′58″N 80°51′48″W	Charlotte	
109	White Oak Plantation		February 7, 1978 (#78001966)	East of Charlotte on NC 2826; 35°14′54″N 80°41′26″W	Charlotte	

== Former listings ==
	Name on the Register	Image	Date listed	Date removed	Location	City or town	Description
1	Carolina Theater		August 14, 1986 (#86001637)	June 22, 1988	224-232 N. Tryon St.	Charlotte	
2	Dinkins House		December 4, 1973 (#73001360)	May 31, 1995	Northwestern side of NC 1126, 1.2 miles from NC 1136 (Original location. Now located at:); 35°07′39″N 80°47′48″W	Pineville	Delisted due to relocation and modification.
3	Thomas Trotter Building		May 23, 1985 (#85001129)	February 1, 1988	108 S. Tryon St.	Charlotte	Demolished in May 1987.

== See also ==
- National Register of Historic Places listings in North Carolina
- List of National Historic Landmarks in North Carolina
