= Davidson Historic District =

Historic district in North Carolina, United States

- U.S. National Register of Historic Places
- U.S. Historic district
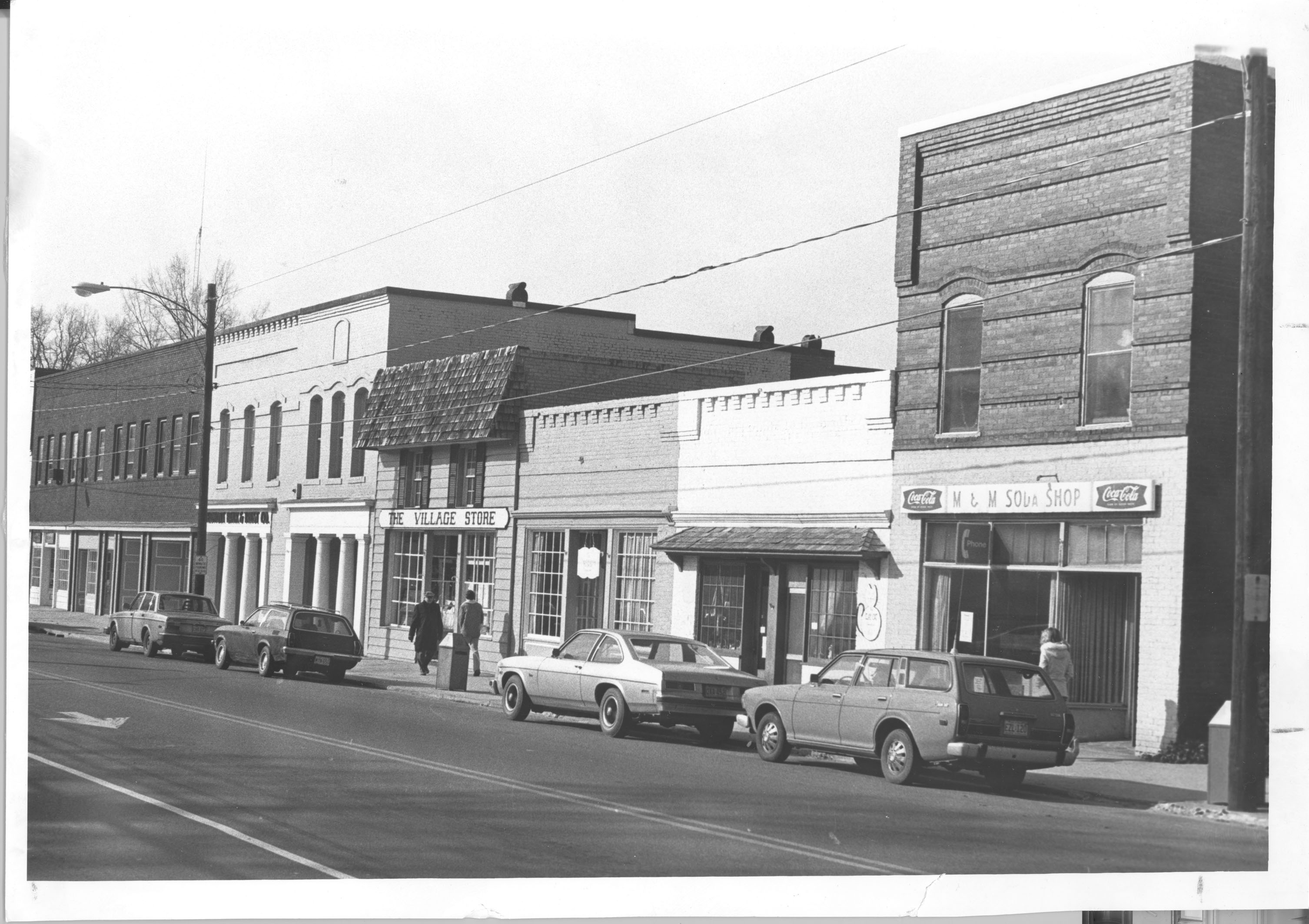
- Davidson Historic District around 1970

- Location within North Carolina Location within the United States
- Location: Bounded by N. Main and Beaty Sts., Catawba Ave. Mock and Concord Rds., Pat Stough and Dogwood Lns., Davidson College, Davidson, North Carolina
- Coordinates: 35°30′29″N 80°50′51″W
- Area: 310 acres (130 ha)
- Built: 1837
- Built by: Dinkins, Lewis; Lemly, Samuel
- Architectural style: Greek Revival, Gothic Revival, Italianate
- NRHP reference No.: 09000381
- Added to NRHP: June 1, 2009

Davidson Historic District is a national historic district located at Davidson, Mecklenburg County, North Carolina. The district encompasses 394 contributing buildings, 2 contributing sites, and 2 contributing structures in the central business district and surrounding residential neighborhoods of Davidson and campus of Davidson College. It was developed after 1837 and includes notable examples of Italianate, Greek Revival, and Gothic Revival style architecture. Located in the district are the separately listed Eumenean Hall and Philanthropic Hall. Other notable buildings include the Maxwell Chambers Building, Jackson Row (1928), Helper Hotel (1848), Johnston Grocery Store (1912), Southern Railway Depot (1897), Linden Cotton Factory (1890), Delburg Cotton Mills (1908), Davidson United Methodist Church (1908), Davidson College Presbyterian Church (1951), and Carnegie Library (1909).

It was added to the National Register of Historic Places in 2009.
