= R.F. Outen Pottery =

Historic site in North Carolina, US

- U.S. National Register of Historic Places
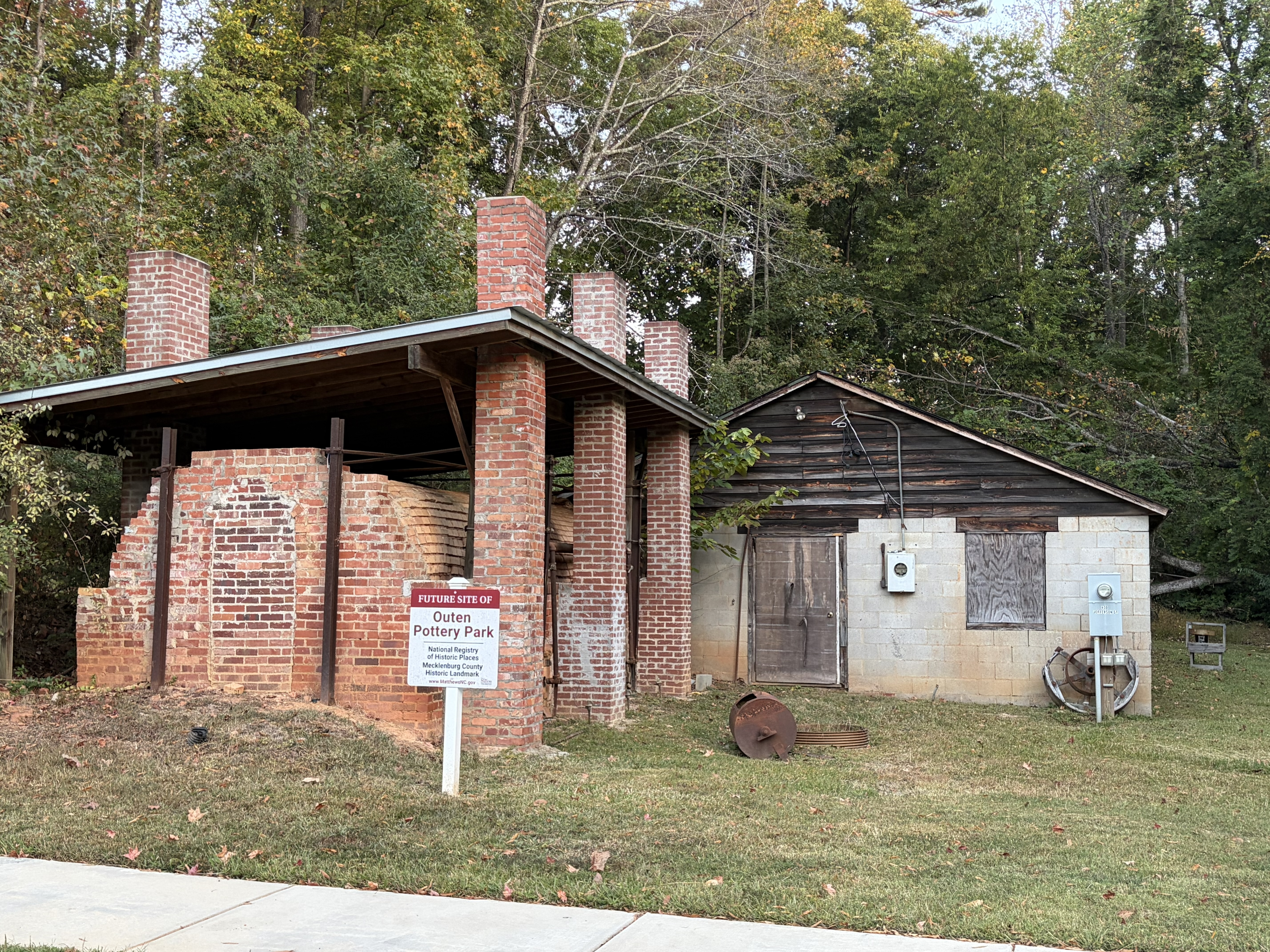
- The pottery photographed in 2025 with a sign indicating plans to preserve it in a park.

- Location within North Carolina Location within the United States
- Location: 430 Jefferson St., Matthews, North Carolina
- Coordinates: 35°6′54″N 80°43′44″W
- Area: 1.5 acres (0.61 ha)
- Built: c.1952
- NRHP reference No.: 15000183
- Added to NRHP: April 24, 2015

The R.F. Outen Pottery is a historic industrial facility at 430 Jefferson Street in Matthews, North Carolina. The roughly 1.5-acre (0.61 ha) property includes a brick kiln, and a concrete-block workshop, both built about 1952 by Rufus Outen. Abutting the workshop to the north is a metal roofed and sided shed, in which Outen stored clay. Outen, trained by his father at the Matthews Pottery, produced utilitarian folk pottery on these premises until his retirement in 1976. The facility is a well-preserved example of a complete mid-20th century folk pottery works.

The property was listed on the National Register of Historic Places in 2015.

== See also ==
- National Register of Historic Places listings in Mecklenburg County, North Carolina
