= Palmer Fire School =

Historic school building in North Carolina, United States

- U.S. National Register of Historic Places
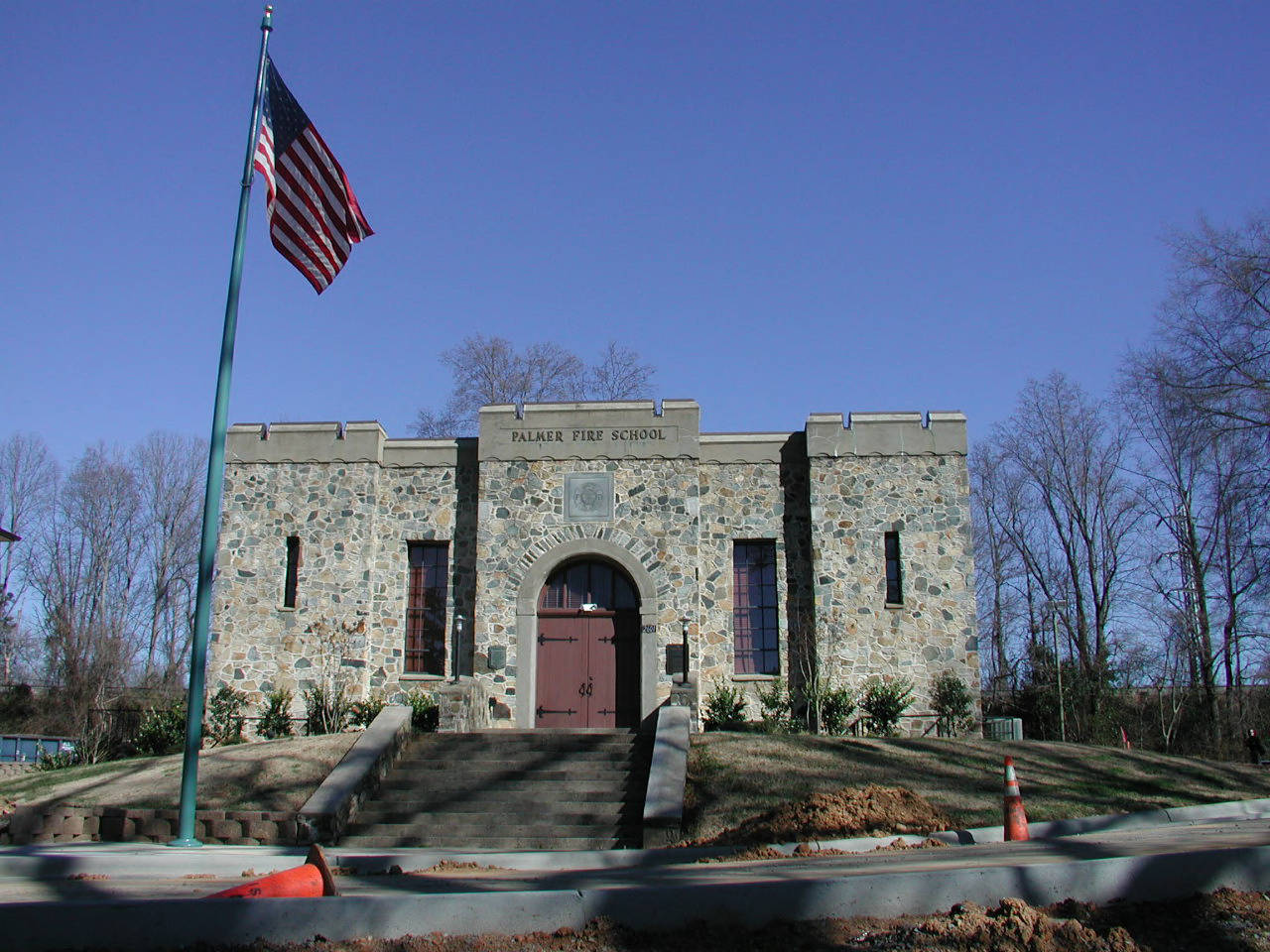
- Palmer Fire School, January 2005

- Location within North Carolina Location within the United States
- Location: 2601 E. Seventh St., Charlotte, North Carolina
- Coordinates: 35°26′15″N 82°13′45″W
- Area: 5 acres (2.0 ha)
- Built: 1938, 1940
- Built by: City of Charlotte Engineering Dept.
- Architectural style: Late Gothic Revival
- NRHP reference No.: 04000906
- Added to NRHP: August 25, 2004

Palmer Fire School, also known as Firemen's Hall, is a historic school complex for firefighters located at Charlotte, Mecklenburg County, North Carolina. The complex consists of the 1940, one-story, rock-faced assembly hall and the 1938, six-story, red-brick training tower. The assembly hall is a Late Gothic Revival style building, five bays wide with a stuccoed, crenellated parapet and projecting end bays. Its construction was funded by the Works Progress Administration (WPA) and was the only drill school for firemen funded by the WPA.

It was added to the National Register of Historic Places in 2004.

== See also ==
- Fire Station No. 2 (Charlotte, North Carolina)
- Grinnell Company-General Fire Extinguisher Company Complex
