= Mayes House =

Historic house in North Carolina, United States

- U.S. National Register of Historic Places
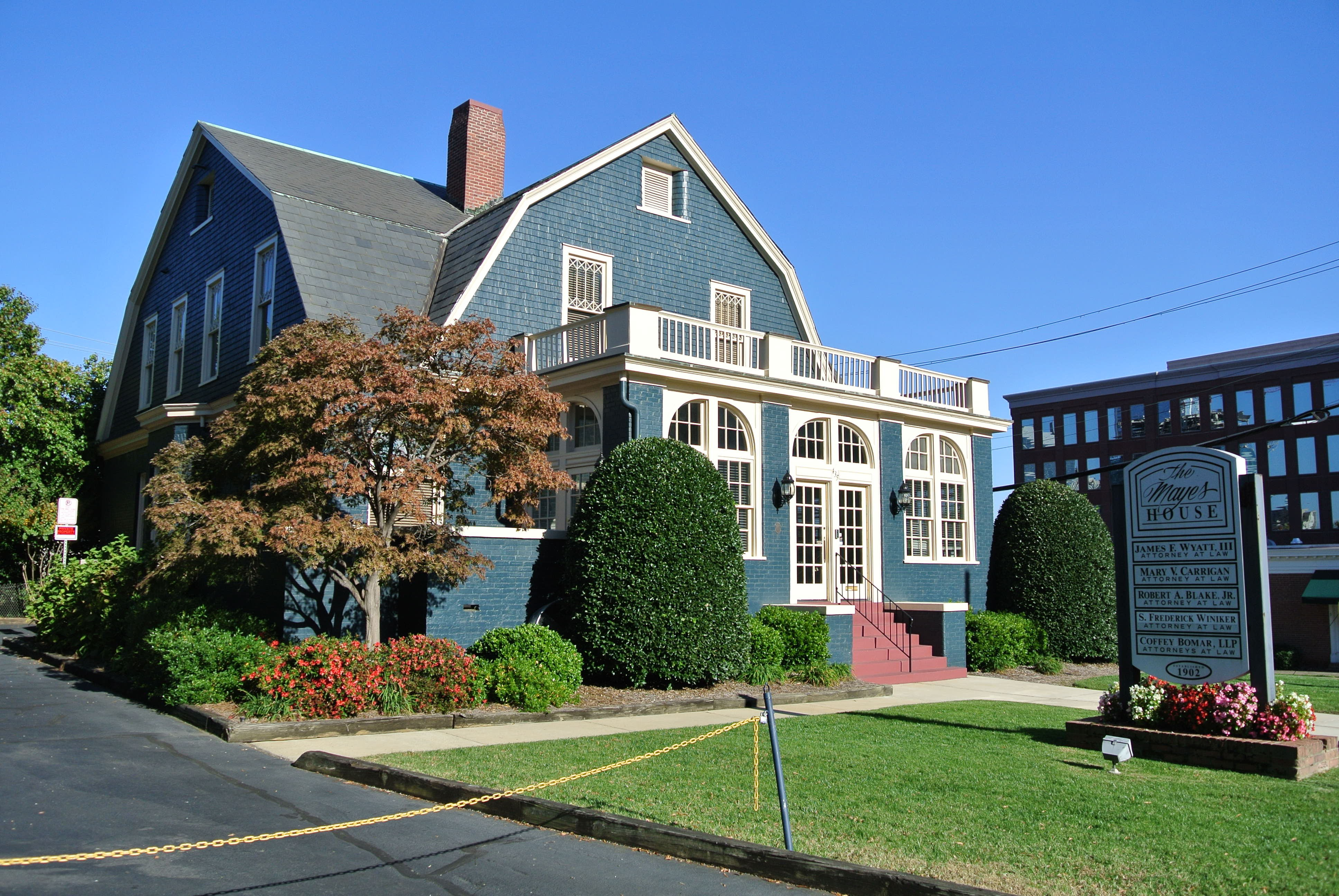
- Mayes House, October 2016

- Location within North Carolina Location within the United States
- Location: 435 E. Morehead St., Charlotte, North Carolina
- Coordinates: 35°11′26″N 80°50′54″W
- Area: 0.3 acres (0.12 ha)
- Built: c. 1902
- Architectural style: Shingle Style
- NRHP reference No.: 93000735
- Added to NRHP: August 5, 1993

Mayes House is a historic home located at Charlotte, Mecklenburg County, North Carolina. It was built about 1902, and is a two-story, Shingle Style frame dwelling. The house has a cross-gambrel slate roof, raised brick basement, projecting bays, and a front porch. It is currently being used as an office building.

It was listed on the National Register of Historic Places in 1993.
