= Victoria (Charlotte, North Carolina) =

Historic house in North Carolina, United States

- U.S. National Register of Historic Places
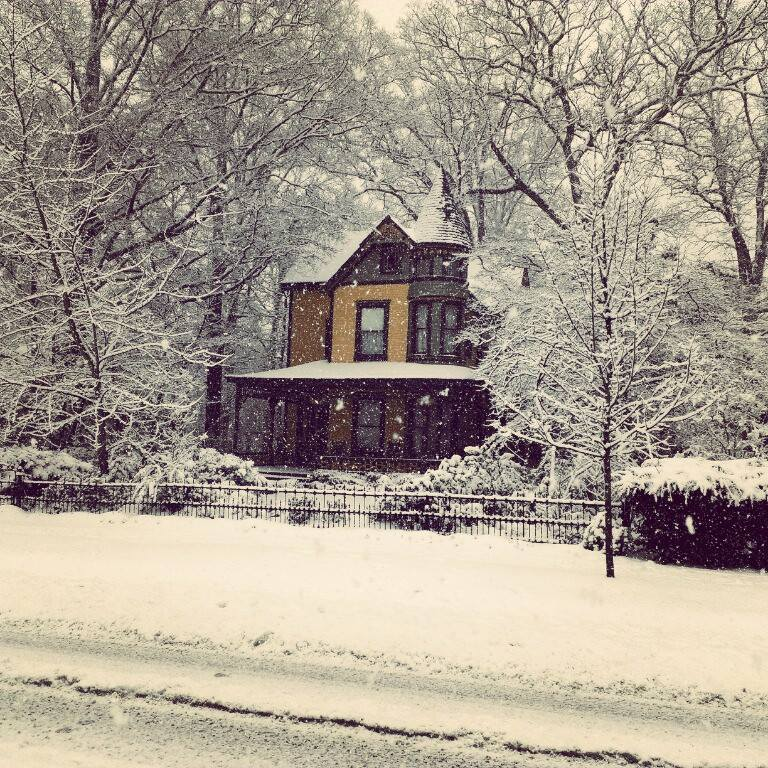
- View from the street

- Location within North Carolina Location within the United States
- Location: 1600 The Plaza, Charlotte, North Carolina
- Coordinates: 35°13′26″N 80°48′37″W
- Area: less than one acre
- Built: c. 1895
- Architectural style: Queen Anne
- NRHP reference No.: 73001359
- Added to NRHP: April 11, 1973

Victoria is a historic home located at Charlotte, Mecklenburg County, North Carolina. It was built about 1895, and is a two-story, T-shaped, Queen Anne style dwelling. It has a slate roof and features a 2 1/2-story, engaged, tower with a conical roof. It was moved from the corner of Tryon and Seventh Streets to its present location about 1895.

It was listed on the National Register of Historic Places in 1973.
