= Samuel J. McElroy House =

Historic house in North Carolina, United States

- U.S. National Register of Historic Places
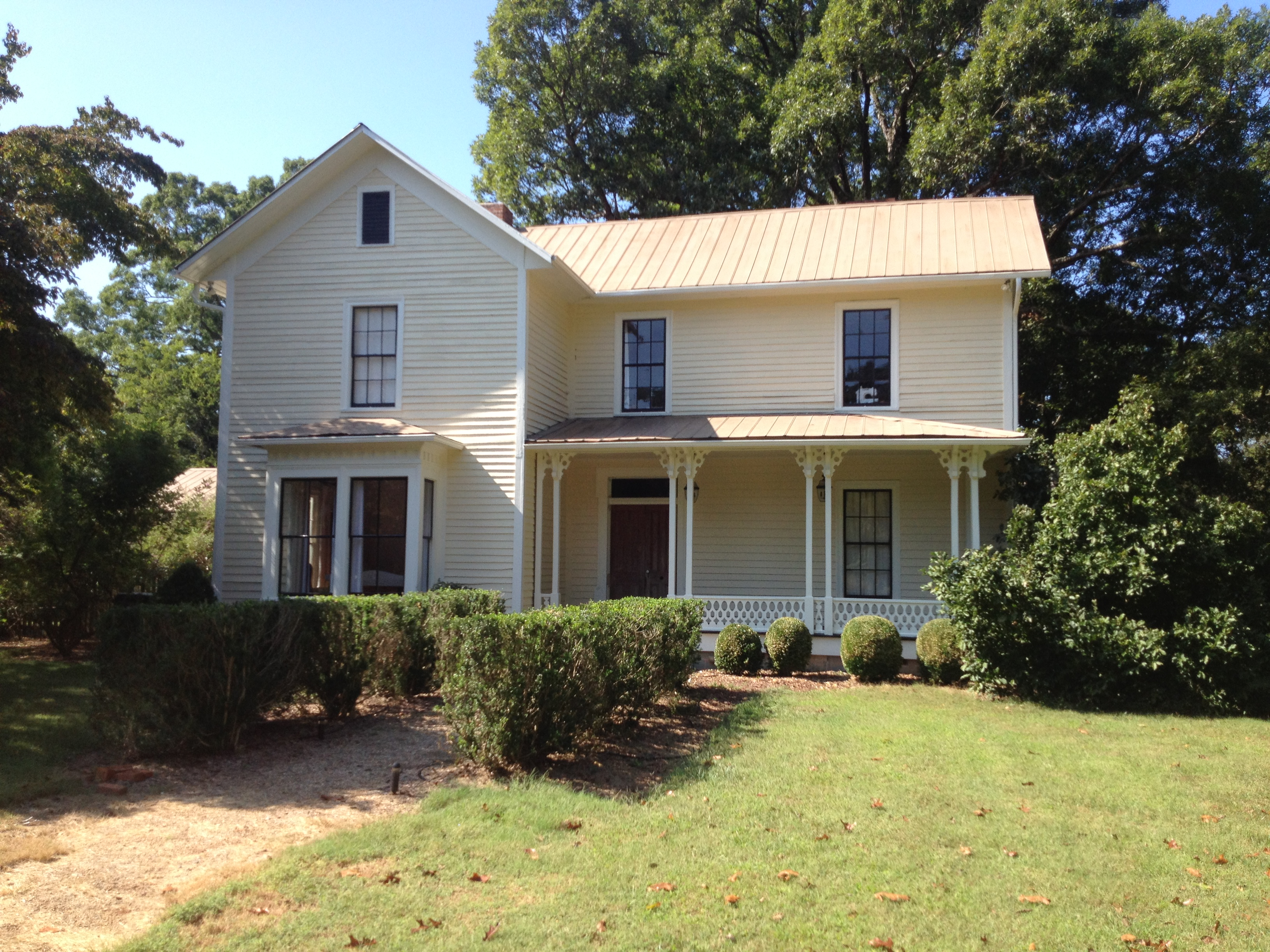
- Samuel J. McElroy House, September 2013

- Location within North Carolina Location within the United States
- Location: W of Huntersville on SR 2720, near Huntersville, North Carolina
- Coordinates: 35°22′11″N 80°54′9″W
- Area: 1.9 acres (0.77 ha)
- Built: 1885
- Architectural style: Vernacular Victorian
- MPS: Rural Mecklenburg County MPS
- NRHP reference No.: 91000078
- Added to NRHP: February 21, 1991

Samuel J. McElroy House is a historic home located near Huntersville, Mecklenburg County, North Carolina. It was built about 1885, and is a two-story, T-shaped vernacular Victorian style frame farmhouse. It has gable roof and features a porch with original decorative woodwork. It has a one-story rear kitchen wing and a smokehouse. Also on the property is a contributing tack house (c. 1885).

It was listed on the National Register of Historic Places in 1991.
