= John F. Ewart Farm =

Historic house in North Carolina, United States

- U.S. National Register of Historic Places
- U.S. Historic district
- Location within North Carolina Location within the United States
- Location: 12920 Huntersville-Concord Rd., near Huntersville, North Carolina
- Coordinates: 35°24′45″N 80°49′26″W
- Area: 11 acres (4.5 ha)
- Built: 1898
- Built by: Barnette, Neil
- Architectural style: Vernacular I-house
- MPS: Rural Mecklenburg County MPS
- NRHP reference No.: 91000023
- Added to NRHP: February 4, 1991

John F. Ewart Farm is a historic home, farm, and national historic district located near Huntersville, Mecklenburg County, North Carolina. The district encompasses five contributing buildings and one contributing site in rural Mecklenburg County. The farmhouse was built in 1898, and is a two-story, three-bay, vernacular I-house with a rear kitchen ell. It has a triple-A roof and two exterior, brick end chimneys. It features a pedimented gable front porch. Other contributing resources include a dairy and well canopy (c. 1898), a smokehouse (c. 1898), barn (c. 1898), barn (c. 1939), and the agricultural landscape.

It was added to the National Register of Historic Places in 1991.

In 2006 the house was moved to 15817 Centennial Forest Drive in Huntersville, NC.
