= Thomas and Latitia Gluyas House =

Historic house in North Carolina, United States

- U.S. National Register of Historic Places
- Location within North Carolina Location within the United States
- Location: 7314 Mount Holly-Huntersville Rd., Huntersville, North Carolina
- Coordinates: 35°20′39″N 80°54′3″W
- Area: 2.1 acres (0.85 ha)
- Built: 1865
- Architectural style: I-house
- MPS: Mecklenburg County MPSMecklenburg County MPS
- NRHP reference No.: 01000725
- Added to NRHP: July 11, 2001

Thomas and Latitia Gluyas House is a historic home located near Huntersville, Mecklenburg County, North Carolina. It was built about 1865, and is a two-story, three-bay, I-house with a one-story rear ell. It has side gable roof, exterior brick end chimneys, and a full-width hip roofed porch.

It was listed on the National Register of Historic Places in 2001.
