= Grier-Rea House =

Historic house in North Carolina, United States

- U.S. National Register of Historic Places
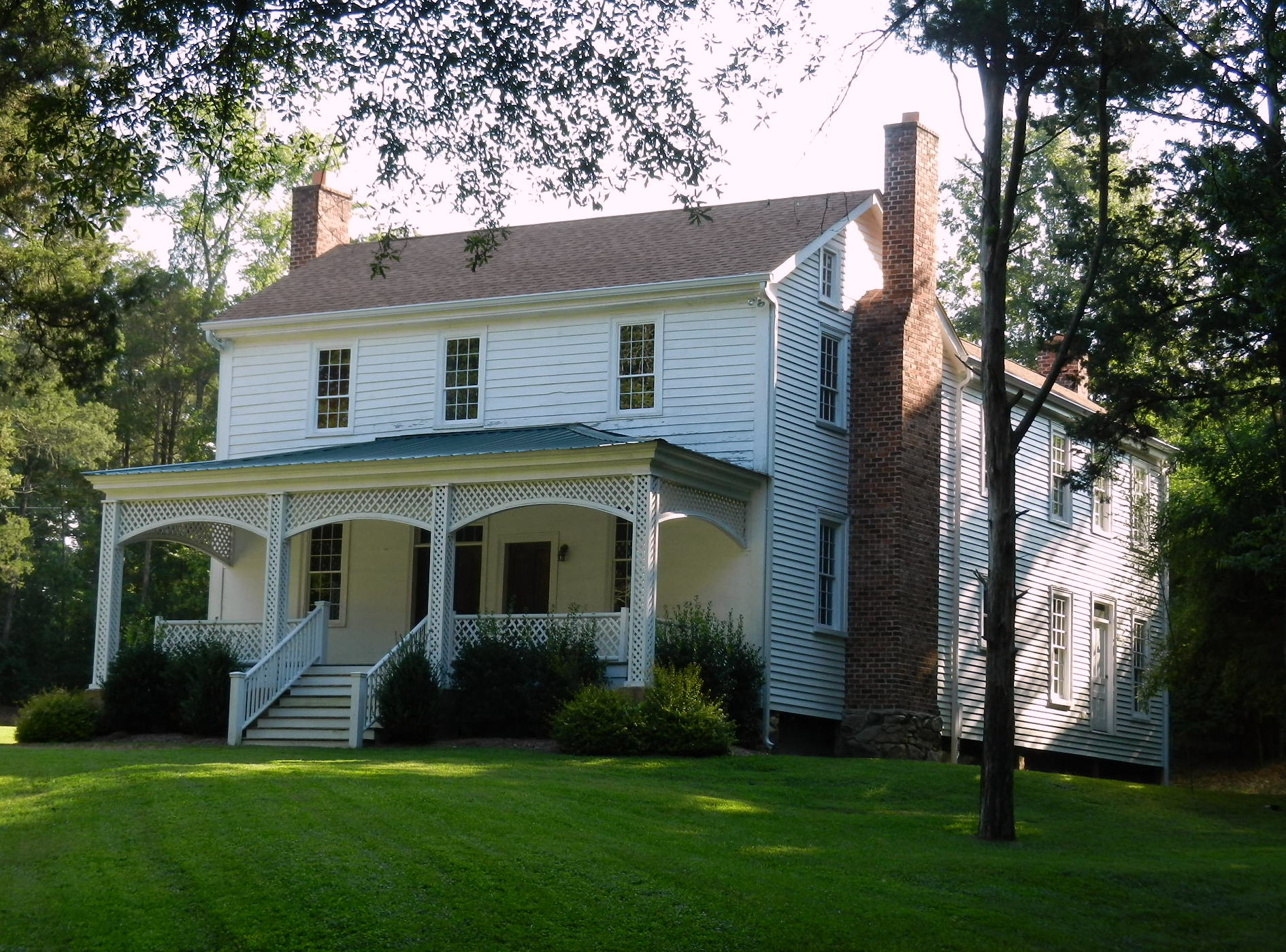
- Grier-Rea House, August 2013

- Location within North Carolina Location within the United States
- Location: 6701 Providence Rd., Charlotte, North Carolina
- Coordinates: 35°07′02″N 80°46′46″W
- Area: 1.55 acres (0.63 ha)
- Built: c. 1815, c. 1830
- MPS: Rural Mecklenburg County MPS
- NRHP reference No.: 10000603
- Added to NRHP: August 30, 2010

Grier-Rea House is a historic farmhouse located near Charlotte, Mecklenburg County, North Carolina. The L-shaped dwelling consists of a two-story, side-gable main block built about 1815, with an original, one-story, rear shed appendage and a two-story, rear ell added about 1830. Also added about 1830 was the hip roofed front porch. The house was moved to its present location in 2002.

It was listed on the National Register of Historic Places in 2010.
