= Sidney and Ethel Grier House =

Historic house in North Carolina, United States

- U.S. National Register of Historic Places
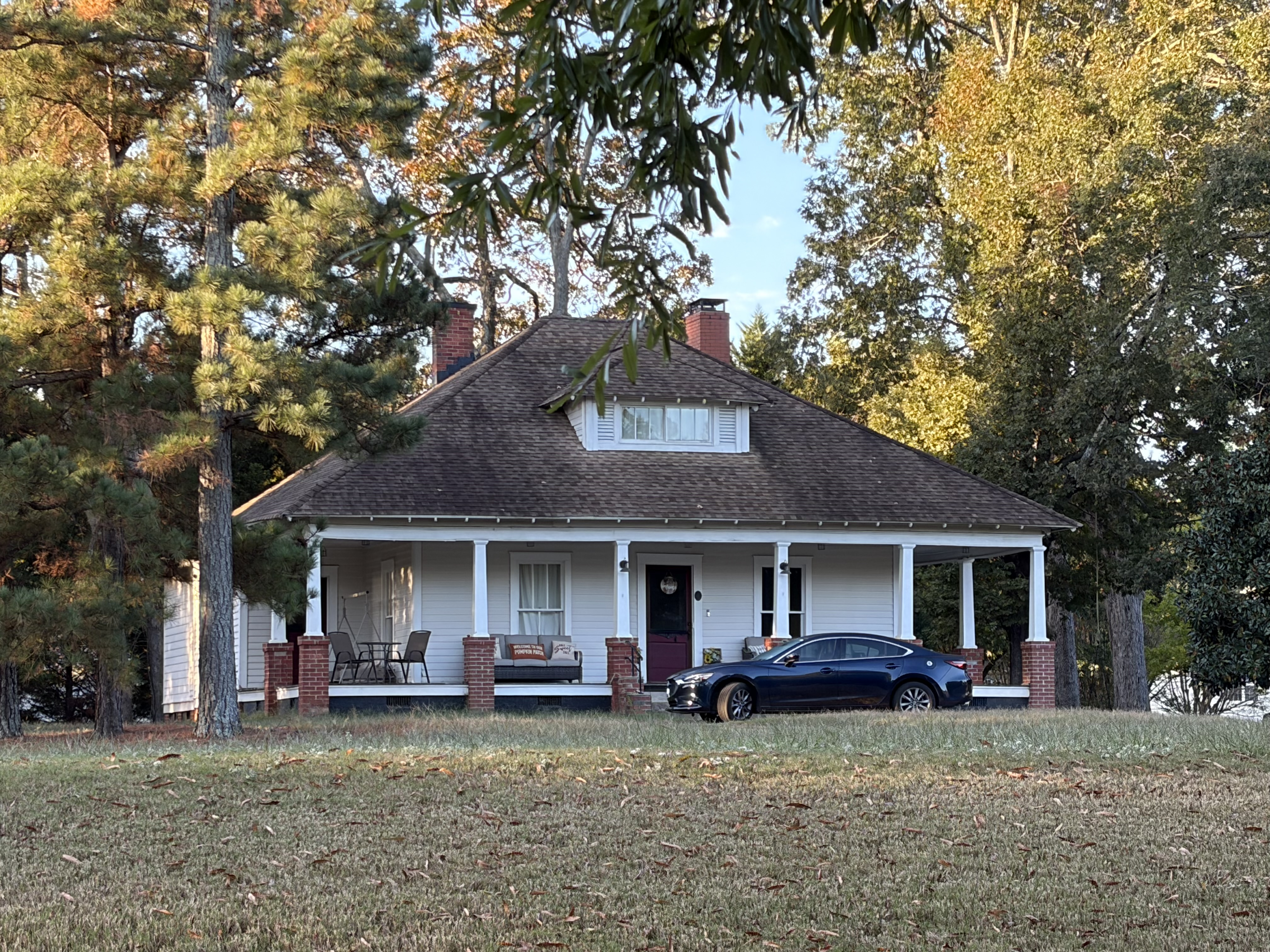
- The Grier House photographed in 2025.

- Location within North Carolina Location within the United States
- Location: 4747 Grier Farm Ln., near Charlotte, North Carolina
- Coordinates: 35°3′44″N 80°45′44″W
- Area: 2 acres (0.81 ha)
- Built: 1916
- Architect: Fincher, Sam
- Architectural style: Bungalow/craftsman
- MPS: Rural Mecklenburg County MPS
- NRHP reference No.: 06000724
- Added to NRHP: August 23, 2006

The Sidney and Ethel Grier House is a historic home located near Charlotte, Mecklenburg County, North Carolina. It was built in 1916, and is one-story, three-bay, vernacular Bungalow / American Craftsman style farmhouse. The house sits on a brick pier foundation, clapboard siding, and has a hipped roof with dormer. It has a 1 1/2-story recent rear addition. It features a wraparound recessed porch, supported by eight tapered half-posts on tall brick piers.

It was listed on the National Register of Historic Places in 2006.
