= Louise Cotton Mill =

Historic building in North Carolina, US

- U.S. National Register of Historic Places
- Location within North Carolina Location within the United States
- Location: 1101 Hawthorne Ln., Charlotte, North Carolina
- Coordinates: 35°13′29″N 80°49′06″W
- Area: 7.709 acres (3.120 ha)
- Built: 1897, 1901
- Architect: Asbury, Foil, & Co.
- NRHP reference No.: 13001027
- Added to NRHP: December 31, 2013

Louise Cotton Mill is a historic textile mill located at Charlotte, Mecklenburg County, North Carolina. The original section was built in 1897, and is a two-story, 27 bay long, rectangular brick building. The original section has segmental-arched windows and a low-pitched gable roof had a monitor with clerestory windows. It was enlarged in 1901 by two one-story sections to form a U-shaped building with a courtyard.

It was added to the National Register of Historic Places in 2013.
