= Merchants and Farmers National Bank Building =

Demolished building in North Carolina, US

- U.S. National Register of Historic Places
- Location within North Carolina Location within the United States
- Location: 123 E. Trade St., Charlotte, North Carolina
- Coordinates: 35°13′36″N 80°50′32″W
- Area: less than one acre
- Built: 1871-1872
- Architectural style: Italianate
- NRHP reference No.: 84002344
- Added to NRHP: March 1, 1984

Merchants and Farmers National Bank Building was a historic bank building in Charlotte, Mecklenburg County, North Carolina. It was built in 1871–1872, a three-story, brick building with a stuccoed front and Italianate style cast iron trim manufactured by the Mecklenburg Iron Works. The building housed Independent Order of Odd Fellows lodges that met there from the 1870s through 1920. It was the oldest surviving commercial building in the central business district of Charlotte until it was demolished in 1989.

It was added to the National Register of Historic Places in 1984. The building was demolished in 1989 to make room for construction of the new corporate headquarter of NCNB, which later became Bank of America. Currently, the Bank of America Corporate Center sits at the former location of the building.
