= Pharrsdale Historic District =

Historic district in North Carolina, United States

- U.S. National Register of Historic Places
- U.S. Historic district
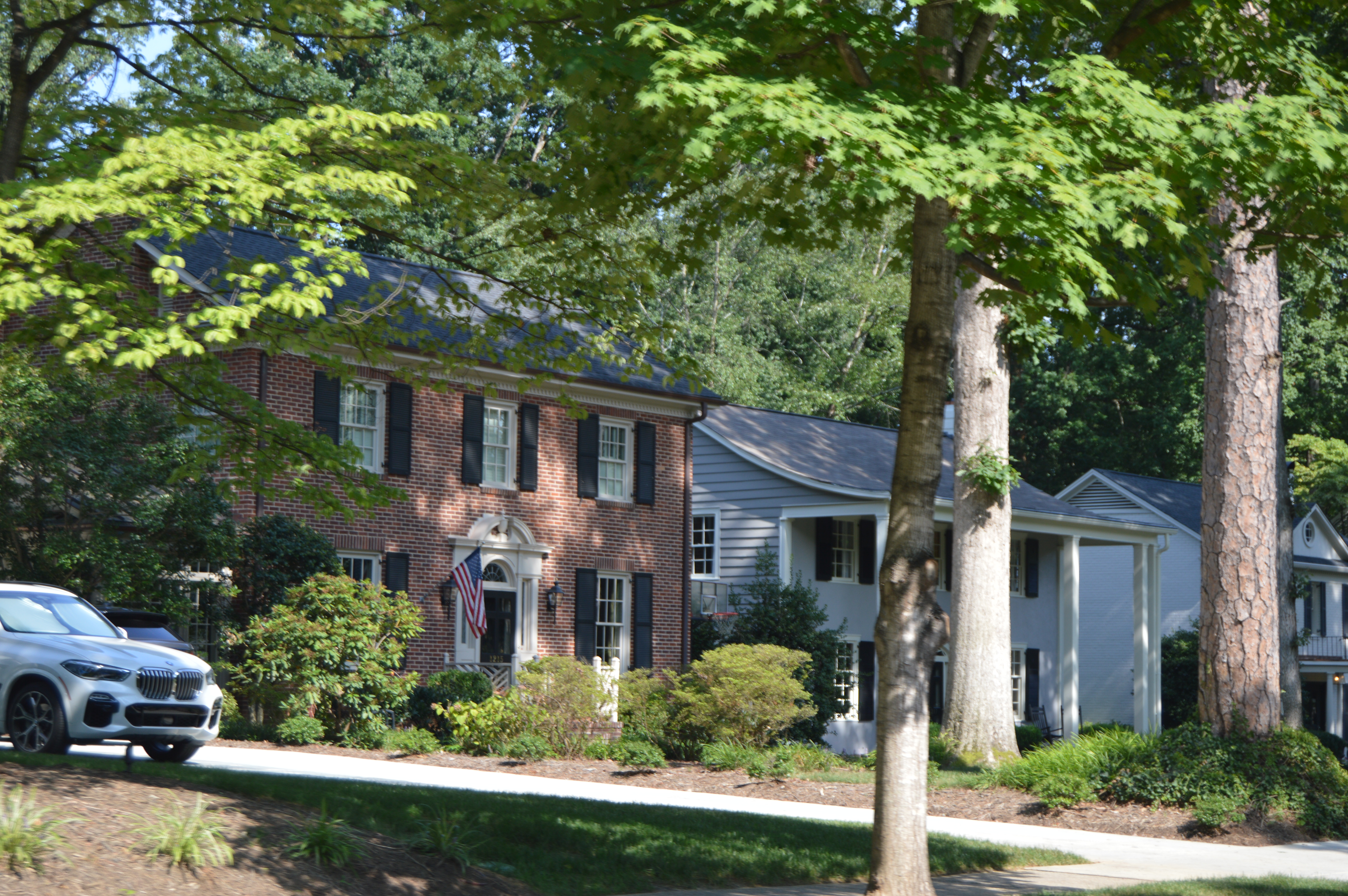
- Houses on Biltmore Drive

- Location within North Carolina Location within the United States
- Location: Bounded by Biltmore Dr. Cherokee Rd., Providence Rd. and Scotland Ave., Charlotte, North Carolina
- Coordinates: 35°11′28″N 80°49′20″W
- Area: 66 acres (27 ha)
- Built: 1926
- Architect: George D. Patterson; Morris R. Ritch
- Architectural style: Colonial Revival, Tudor Revival
- NRHP reference No.: 02000057
- Added to NRHP: February 20, 2002

Pharrsdale Historic District, also known as Eastover, is a national historic district located at Charlotte, Mecklenburg County, North Carolina. The district encompasses 166 contributing buildings in the former suburban Pharrsdale neighborhood of Charlotte. It was developed after 1926 and includes notable examples of Colonial Revival and Tudor Revival style architecture.

It was added to the National Register of Historic Places in 2002.
