= James A. Blakeney House =

Historic house in North Carolina, United States

- U.S. National Register of Historic Places
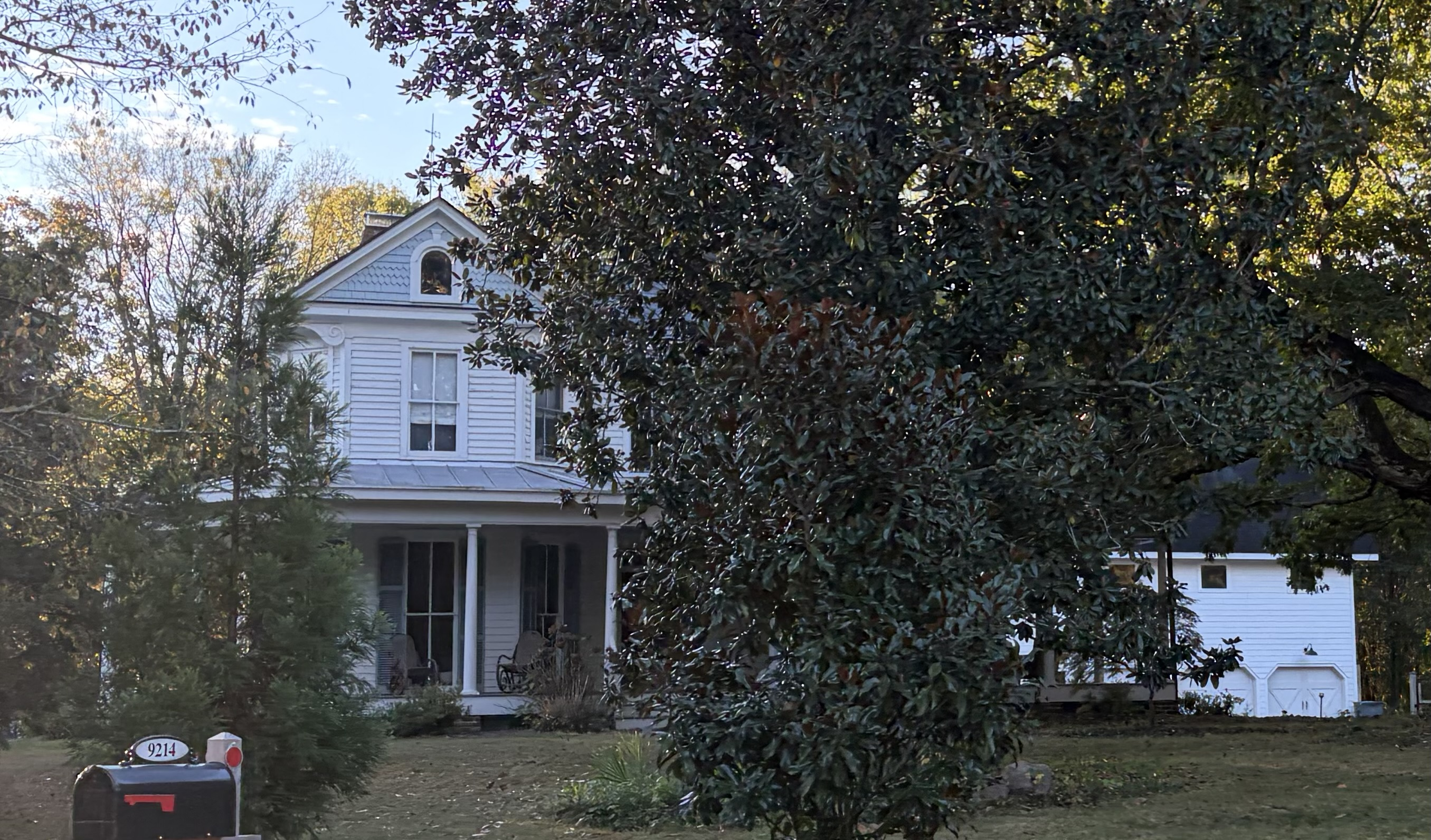

- Location within North Carolina Location within the United States
- Location: West side NC 3629, .5 mi S of jct NC 3626, near Providence, North Carolina
- Coordinates: 35°2′24″N 80°49′5″W
- Area: 1.7 acres (0.69 ha)
- Built: 1905–1906
- Architectural style: Colonial Revival
- MPS: Rural Mecklenburg County MPS
- NRHP reference No.: 98000706
- Added to NRHP: June 18, 1998

The James A. Blakeney House is a historic house located near Providence, Mecklenburg County, North Carolina. It was built in 1905–1906, and is a two-story, three-bay, Colonial Revival style frame farmhouse with a one-story rear kitchen wing. It has a multiple cross-gable slate roof and a broad hip roofed wraparound porch. Also on the property is a contributing well house.

It was listed on the National Register of Historic Places on June 18, 1998.
