= Liddell-McNinch House =

Historic house in North Carolina, United States

- U.S. National Register of Historic Places
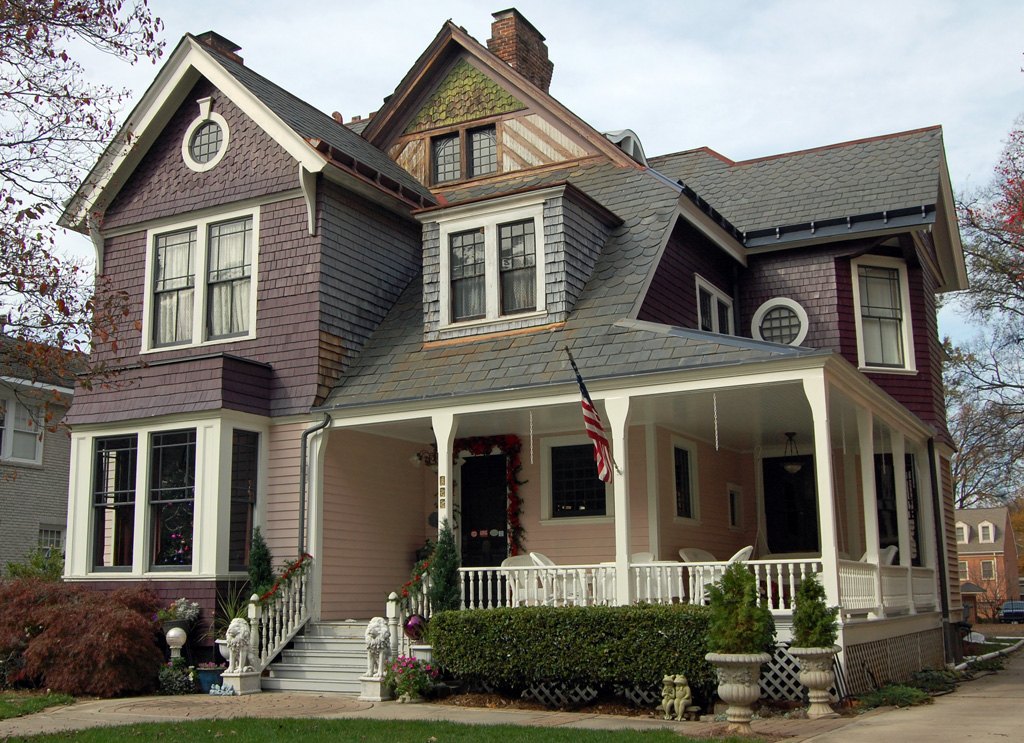
- Liddell-McNinch House, November 2009

- Location within North Carolina Location within the United States
- Location: 511 N. Church St., Charlotte, North Carolina
- Coordinates: 35°13′53″N 80°50′23″W
- Area: less than one acre
- Built: 1891–1893
- Architectural style: Shingle Style, Queen Anne
- NRHP reference No.: 76001330
- Added to NRHP: December 12, 1976

Liddell-McNinch House is a historic home located at Charlotte, Mecklenburg County, North Carolina. It was built between 1891 and 1893, and is a 2 1/2-story, Queen Anne / Shingle Style frame dwelling. The house has a highly complex roofline of projections, gables, porches, and spreading eaves, and wall surfaces of weatherboards, shingles, broken planes, swells, and cavities. It features a wraparound porch and a recessed porch on the second level. President William Howard Taft visited the McNinch House in 1909.

The house is named for two of its previous owners, Vinton Liddell, and Charlotte mayor Samuel S. McNinch. It was listed on the National Register of Historic Places in 1976.
