= John Washington McKinney House =

Historic house in North Carolina, United States

- U.S. National Register of Historic Places
- Location within North Carolina Location within the United States
- Location: 7332 Providence Rd. W., near Charlotte, North Carolina
- Coordinates: 35°3′39″N 80°48′17″W
- Area: 3.3 acres (1.3 ha)
- Built: c. 1916
- Architectural style: Colonial Revival
- MPS: Rural Mecklenburg County MPS
- NRHP reference No.: 91000079
- Added to NRHP: February 21, 1991

John Washington McKinney House was a historic home located near Charlotte, Mecklenburg County, North Carolina. The I-house was built in the 1870s, and was remodeled in the Colonial Revival style about 1916. It was a two-story, double pile farmhouse with a slate hipped roof and one-story rear kitchen ell. Also on the property were a contributing wellhouse / dairy (c. 1916) and smokehouse (c. 1916). It has been demolished.

It was listed on the National Register of Historic Places in 1991.
