= Carolina Transfer and Storage Company Building =

Historic building in North Carolina, US

- U.S. National Register of Historic Places
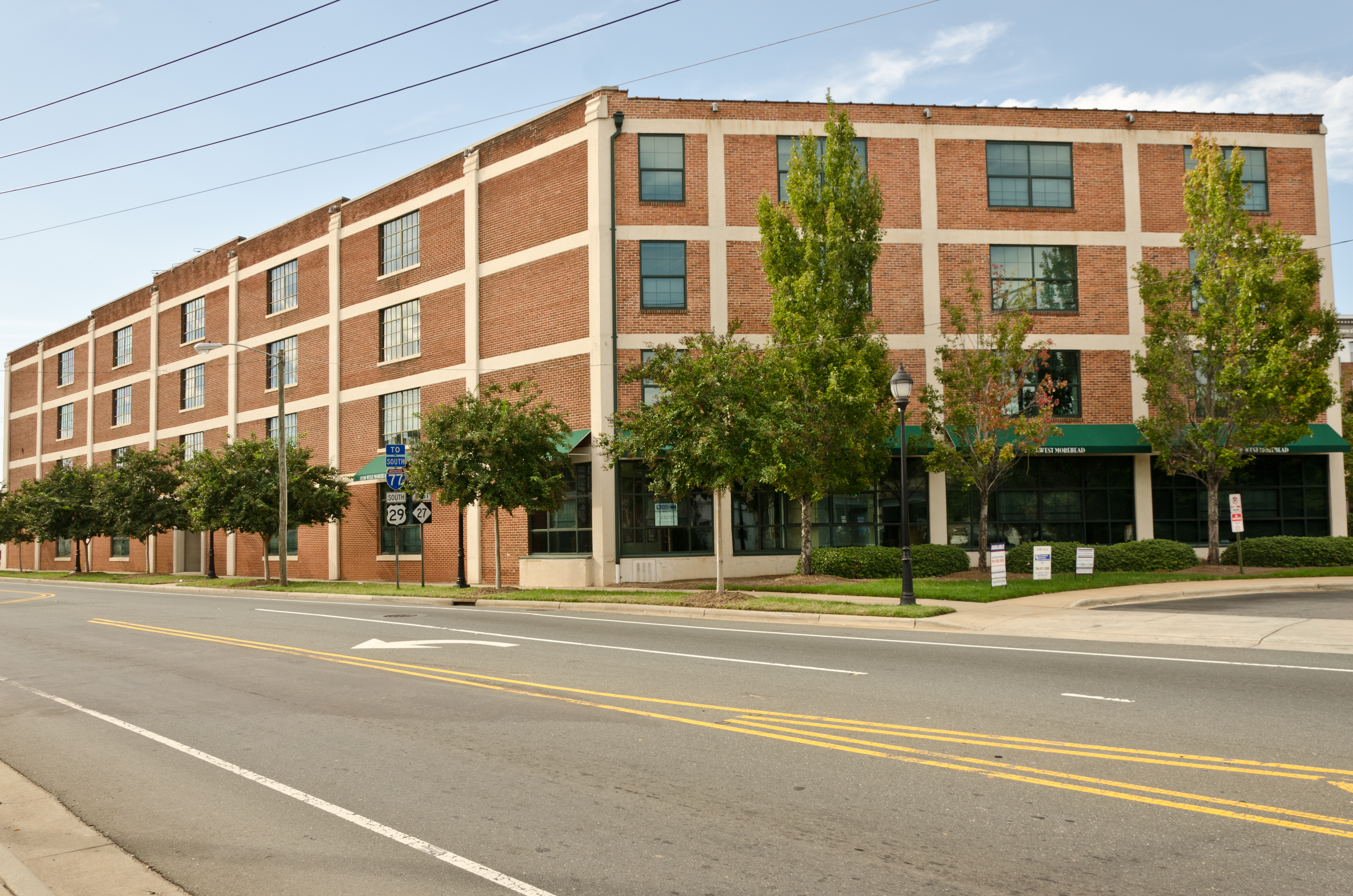
- Carolina Transfer and Storage Company Building, (Former), September 2014

- Location within North Carolina Location within the United States
- Location: 1230 W. Morehead St., Charlotte, North Carolina
- Coordinates: 35°13′44″N 80°51′42″W
- Area: 1.1 acres (0.45 ha)
- Built: 1927
- Architect: G.T. Barnes
- Architectural style: Early Commercial
- NRHP reference No.: 99001447
- Added to NRHP: November 30, 1999

Carolina Transfer and Storage Company Building is a historic warehouse building located at Charlotte, Mecklenburg County, North Carolina, United States. It was built in 1927, and is a four-story, flat-slab construction building with brick infill. The building has a flat roof and parapet.

It was added to the National Register of Historic Places in 1999.
