= Former Thrift Mill =

Historic district in North Carolina, United States

- Thrift Mill, Former
- U.S. National Register of Historic Places
- U.S. Historic district
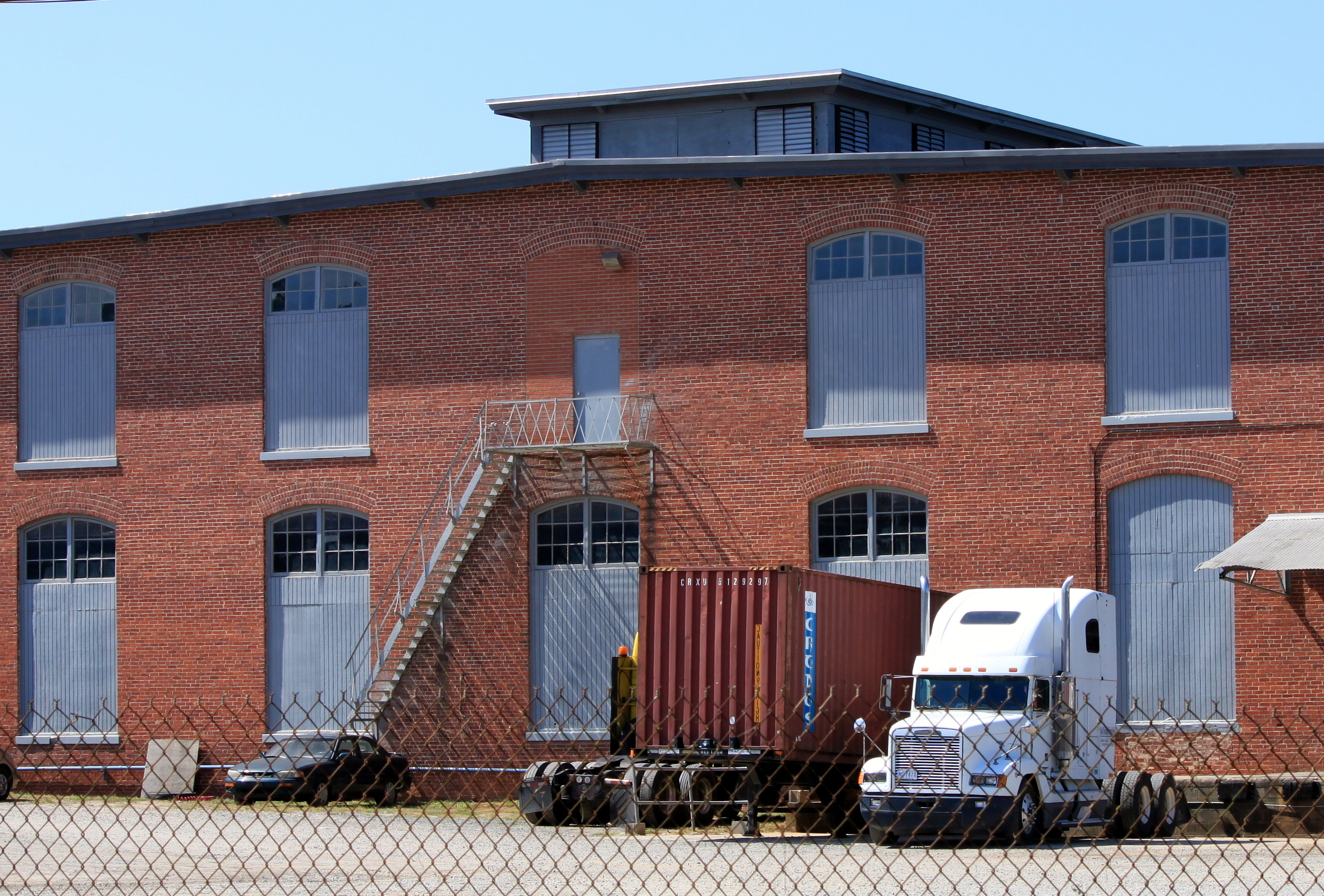
- Former Thrift Mill, September 2014

- Location within North Carolina Location within the United States
- Location: 8300 Moore's Chapel Rd., Charlotte, North Carolina
- Coordinates: 35°16′37″N 80°56′40″W
- Area: 16 acres (6.5 ha)
- Built: 1912
- Architectural style: Functional Industrial
- NRHP reference No.: 94001049
- Added to NRHP: August 26, 1994

Former Thrift Mill is a historic textile mill complex and national historic district located near Charlotte, Mecklenburg County, North Carolina. The complex was built about 1912 and consists of three principal production and warehouse buildings: the Main Building; the Weave Department; and the Warehouse. Other contributing resources are the brick Storage Structure (c. 1912); the Reservoir (c. 1912); Water Tower No. 1 (c. 1925); Water Tower No. 2 (c. 1925); and Pump House No. 1 (c. 1925).

It was added to the National Register of Historic Places in 1994.
