= Matthews Commercial Historic District =

Historic district in North Carolina, United States

- U.S. National Register of Historic Places
- U.S. Historic district
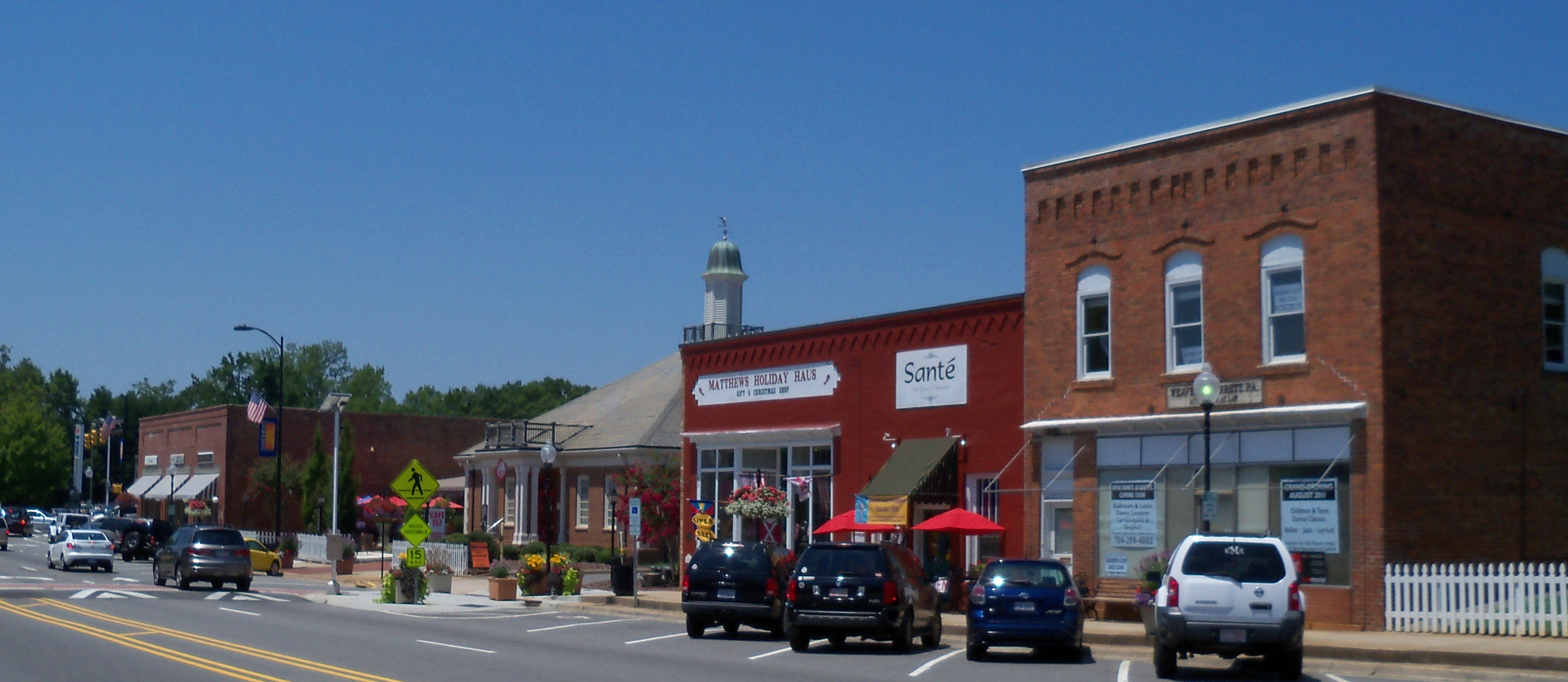
- Matthews Commercial Historic District, July 2011

- Location within North Carolina Location within the United States
- Location: 157-195 and 156-196 N. Trade St., 118 E. Charles St., Matthews, North Carolina
- Coordinates: 35°6′59″N 80°43′20″W
- Area: 2.5 acres (1.0 ha)
- Built: c. 1900
- NRHP reference No.: 96000928
- Added to NRHP: August 22, 1996

Matthews Commercial Historic District is a national historic district located at Matthews, Mecklenburg County, North Carolina. The district encompasses 10 contributing buildings in the central business district of Matthews. It was developed between 1888 and 1939. Notable buildings include the United States Post Office (1939), Heath and Reid General Store (1888), Funderburk Brothers complex (1890s), and Renfrow Hardware (c. 1900).

It was added to the National Register of Historic Places in 1996.
