= Fritz Seifart House =

Historic house in North Carolina, United States

- U.S. National Register of Historic Places
- Location within North Carolina Location within the United States
- Location: 421 Hempstead Place, Charlotte, North Carolina
- Coordinates: 35°12′2″N 80°48′56″W
- Area: 5.3 acres (2.1 ha)
- Built: 1938
- Architect: Marsh, M.R.; Leemon, Clarence
- Architectural style: Tudor Revival
- NRHP reference No.: 06001141
- Added to NRHP: December 20, 2006

Fritz Seifart House is a historic home located at Charlotte, Mecklenburg County, North Carolina. It was built in 1938, and is a Tudor Revival style dwelling of ashlar granite with stonework and patterned brick accents and multiple, stuccoed gables embellished with half-timbering. It has an irregular massing of one and two story sections with a one-story, rear service wing. It features a semi-hexagonal, polygonal-roofed entry tower and massive, stone, exterior chimney.

It was listed on the National Register of Historic Places in 2006.
