= Carolina School Supply Company Building =

Historic building in North Carolina, US

- U.S. National Register of Historic Places
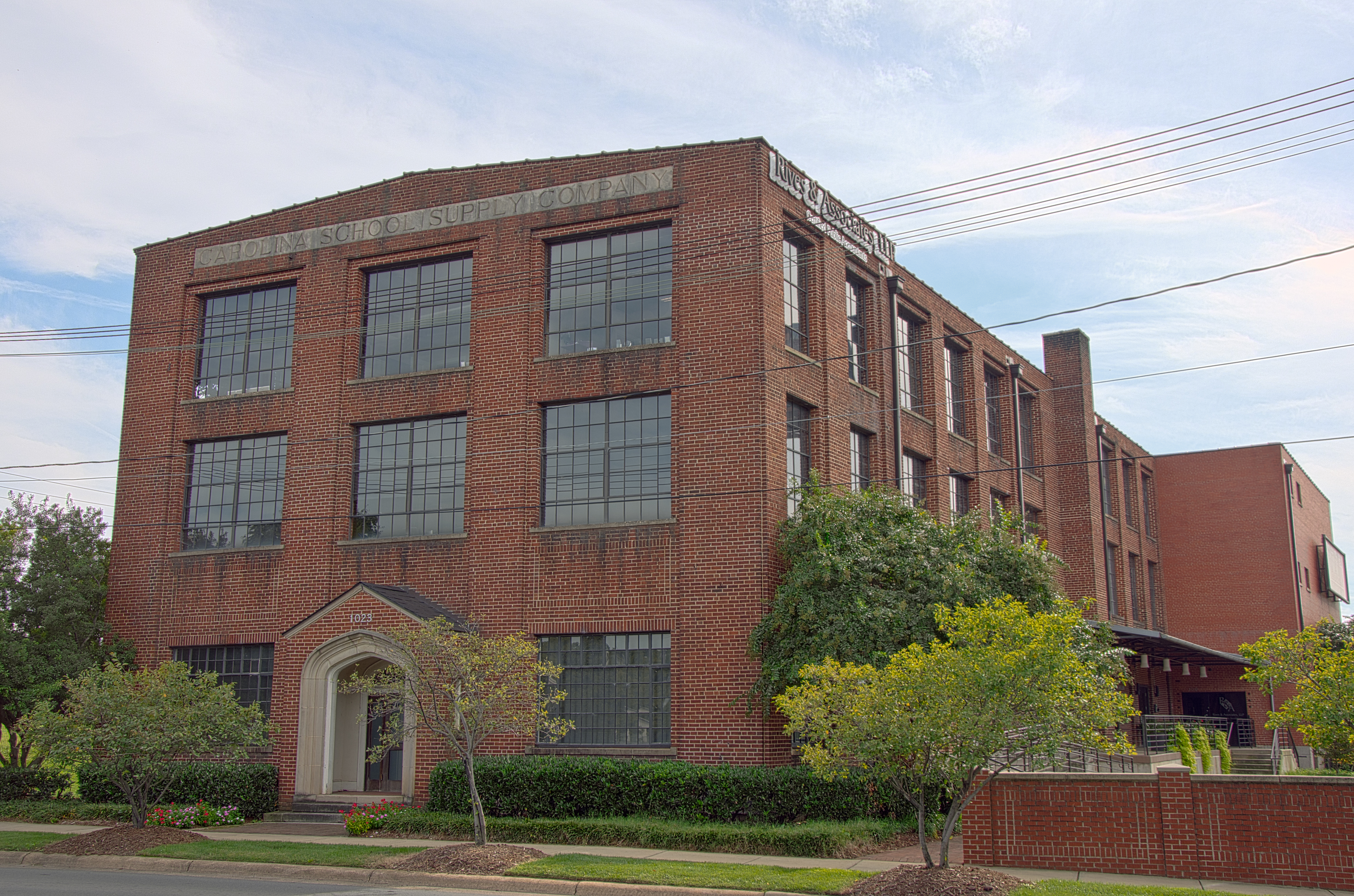
- Carolina School Supply Company Building (Former), September 2014

- Location within North Carolina Location within the United States
- Location: 1023 W. Morehead St., Charlotte, North Carolina
- Coordinates: 35°13′41″N 80°51′38″W
- Area: less than one acre
- Built: 1927
- Architectural style: Gothic Revival
- NRHP reference No.: 01000374
- Added to NRHP: April 12, 2001

Carolina School Supply Company Building is a historic warehouse building located at Charlotte, Mecklenburg County, North Carolina. It was built in 1927, and is a three-story, heavy timber mill construction building with brick veneer and restrained Gothic Revival-style detailing. The building has banks of steel sash windows and a flat roof.

It was added to the National Register of Historic Places in 2001.
