= Orient Manufacturing Company-Chadwick-Hoskins No. 3 =

Historic building in North Carolina, US

- U.S. National Register of Historic Places
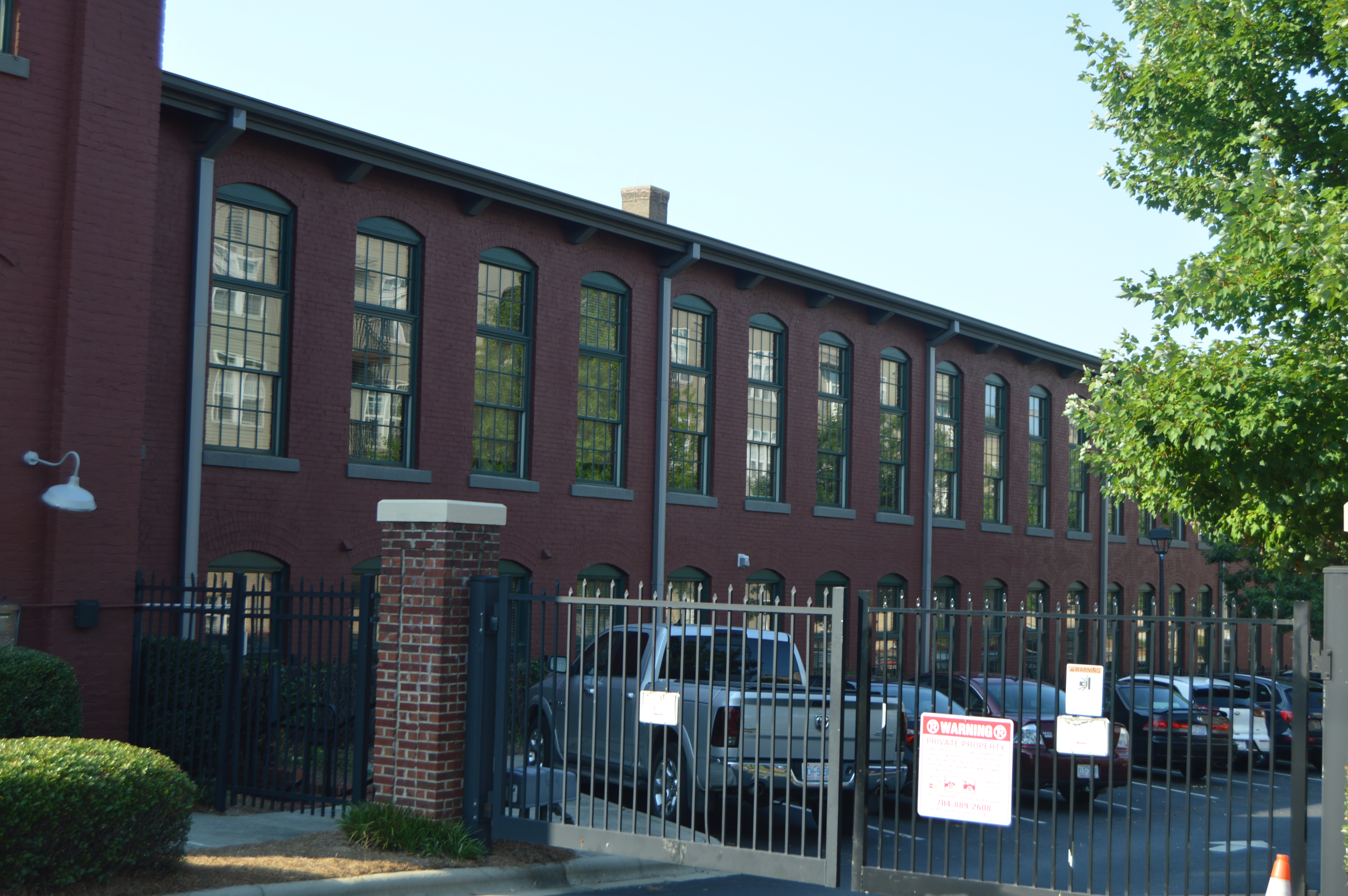
- Interior section of the mill complex

- Location within North Carolina Location within the United States
- Location: 311 E. Twelfth St., Charlotte, North Carolina
- Coordinates: 35°12′12″N 80°49′53″W
- Area: 5.8 acres (2.3 ha)
- Built: 1901-1902
- Built by: Tompkins, D.A., Company
- Architectural style: Romanesque
- NRHP reference No.: 06000721
- Added to NRHP: August 15, 2006

Orient Manufacturing Company-Chadwick-Hoskins No. 3, also known as Alpha-Orient Cotton Mill, is a historic cotton mill located at Charlotte, Mecklenburg County, North Carolina. It was built in 1901–1902, and is a two-story, Romanesque Revival-style brick building. It incorporates portions of an original mill building built about 1889. The building has a low, front gable roof with exposed rafters, brick exterior walls, and segmental arched windows. It features a three-story staircase tower with a castellated parapet, tall, narrow windows, and a round arched entrance.

It was added to the National Register of Historic Places in 2006. The building had been converted into an apartment complex named Alpha Mill Apartments.
