= Overcarsh House =

Historic house in North Carolina, United States

- U.S. National Register of Historic Places
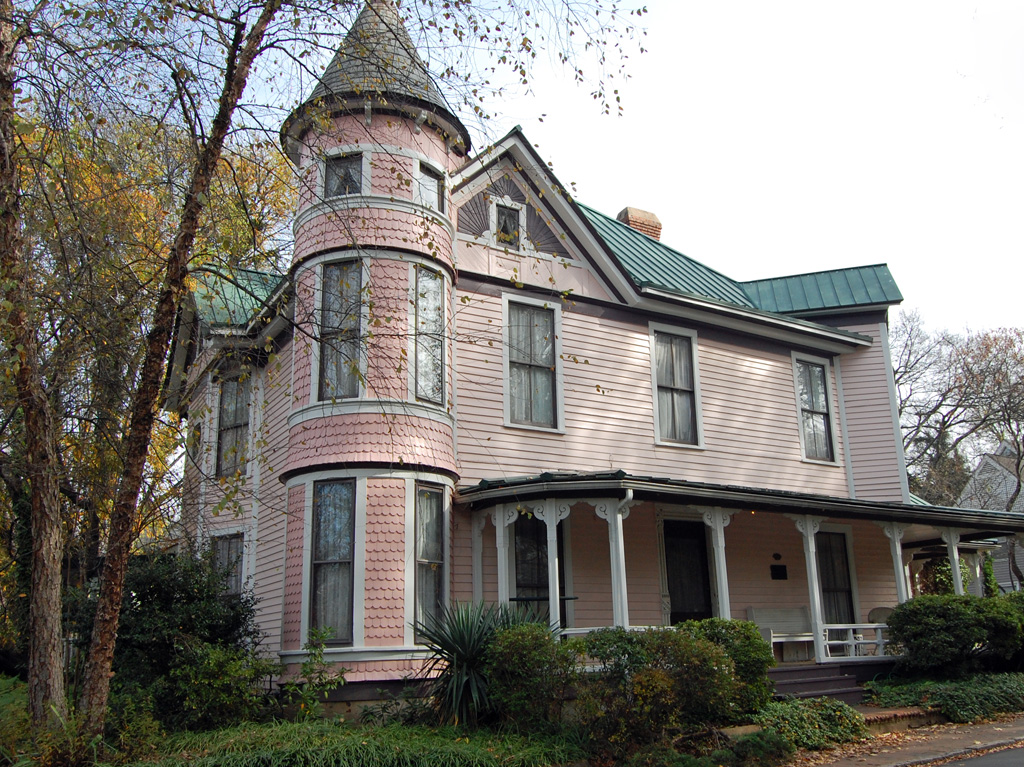
- Overcash House, November 2009

- Location within North Carolina Location within the United States
- Location: 326 W. 8th St., Charlotte, North Carolina
- Coordinates: 35°13′58″N 80°50′30″W
- Area: less than one acre
- Built: c. 1879-1898
- Architectural style: Queen Anne
- NRHP reference No.: 83001896
- Added to NRHP: July 21, 1983

Overcarsh House is a historic home located at Charlotte, Mecklenburg County, North Carolina. It was built between 1879 and 1898, and is a two-story, rectangular Queen Anne style frame dwelling. It is sheathed in weatherboard, sits on a brick foundation, and has a hipped roof on the main block. It features extended gable-roofed bays, a conical-roofed tower, shallow entrance porch, and decorative gables. Its builder, Elias Overcarsh (1821–1898), was a prominent Methodist minister. The Overcarsh family owned the house until 1966.

It was listed on the National Register of Historic Places in 1983.
