= Home Federal Building =

- U.S. National Register of Historic Places
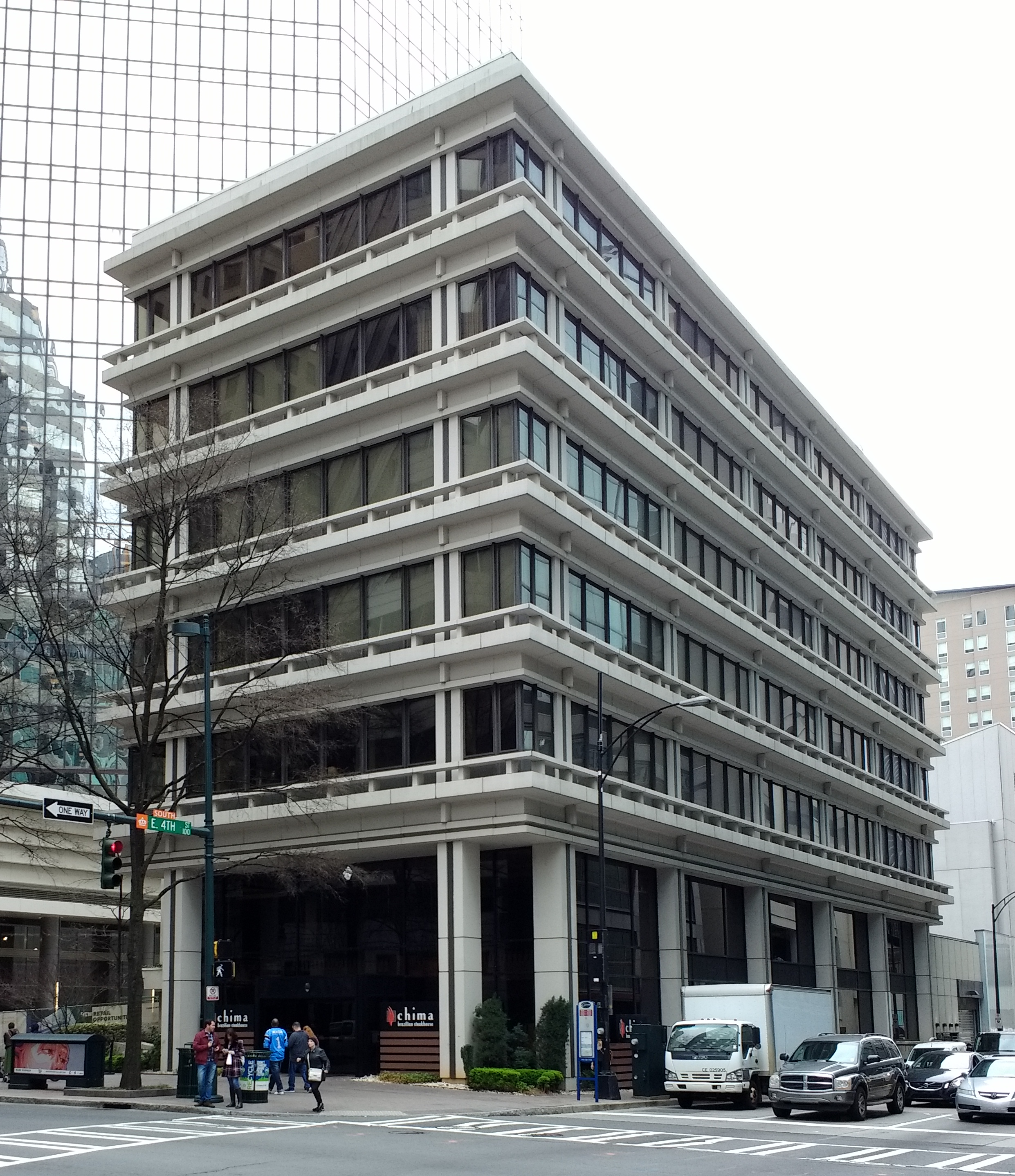

- Location within North Carolina Location within the United States
- Location: 139 S. Tryon St., Charlotte, North Carolina
- Coordinates: 35°13′35″N 80°50′37″W
- Area: less than one acre
- Built: 1967
- Built by: Juno Construction Co.
- Architect: Freeman-White Associates
- Architectural style: International Style
- NRHP reference No.: 07001499
- Added to NRHP: January 30, 2008

Home Federal Building is a historic bank building located at Charlotte, Mecklenburg County, North Carolina. It was built in 1967, and is a seven-story, reinforced-concrete, International Style building with an eight-story concrete-block service tower. Also on the property are a contributing fountain and pool (1967) and walkway bridge (1967). The building has been converted to condominiums.

It was added to the National Register of Historic Places in 2008.
