= Edward M. Rozzell House =

Historic house in North Carolina, United States

- U.S. National Register of Historic Places
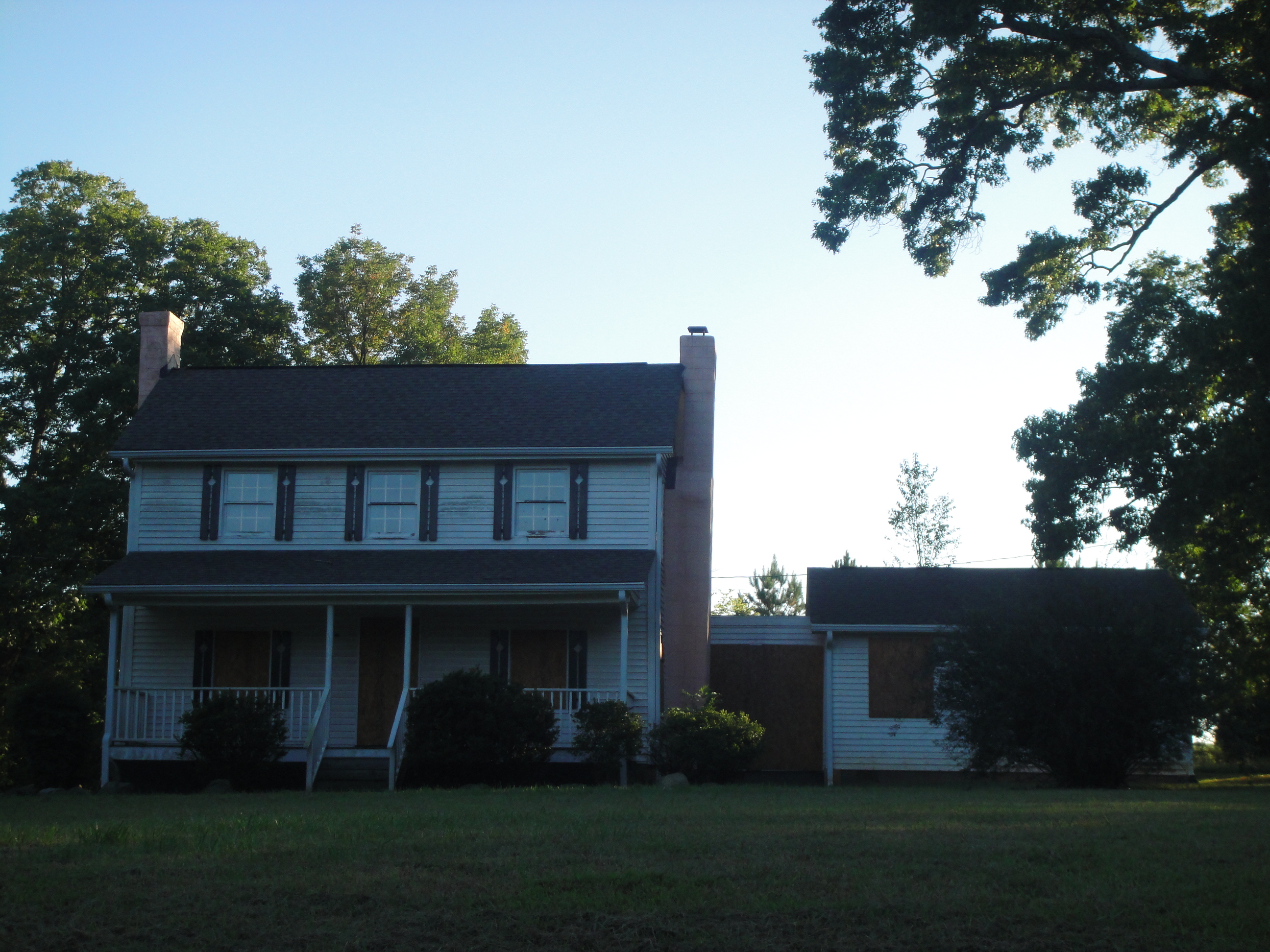
- Edward M. Rozzell House, September 2013

- Location within North Carolina Location within the United States
- Location: 11647 Rozzelles Ferry Rd., near Charlotte, North Carolina
- Coordinates: 35°20′11″N 80°57′54″W
- Area: 3.5 acres (1.4 ha)
- Built: c. 1880, c. 1900
- Built by: Rozzell, Edward M.
- Architectural style: I-house
- MPS: Rural Mecklenburg County MPS
- NRHP reference No.: 04001530
- Added to NRHP: January 20, 2005

Edward M. Rozzell House is a historic home located near Charlotte, Mecklenburg County, North Carolina. It was built about 1880, and is a two-story, three-bay, frame I-house with a kitchen ell. It has a side-gable roof and stucco covered brick end chimneys. Also on the property are the contributing corn crib (c. 1900) and single-pen log barn (c. 1880).

It was listed on the National Register of Historic Places in 2005.
