= Union Storage and Warehouse Company Building =

Historic building in North Carolina, US

- U.S. National Register of Historic Places
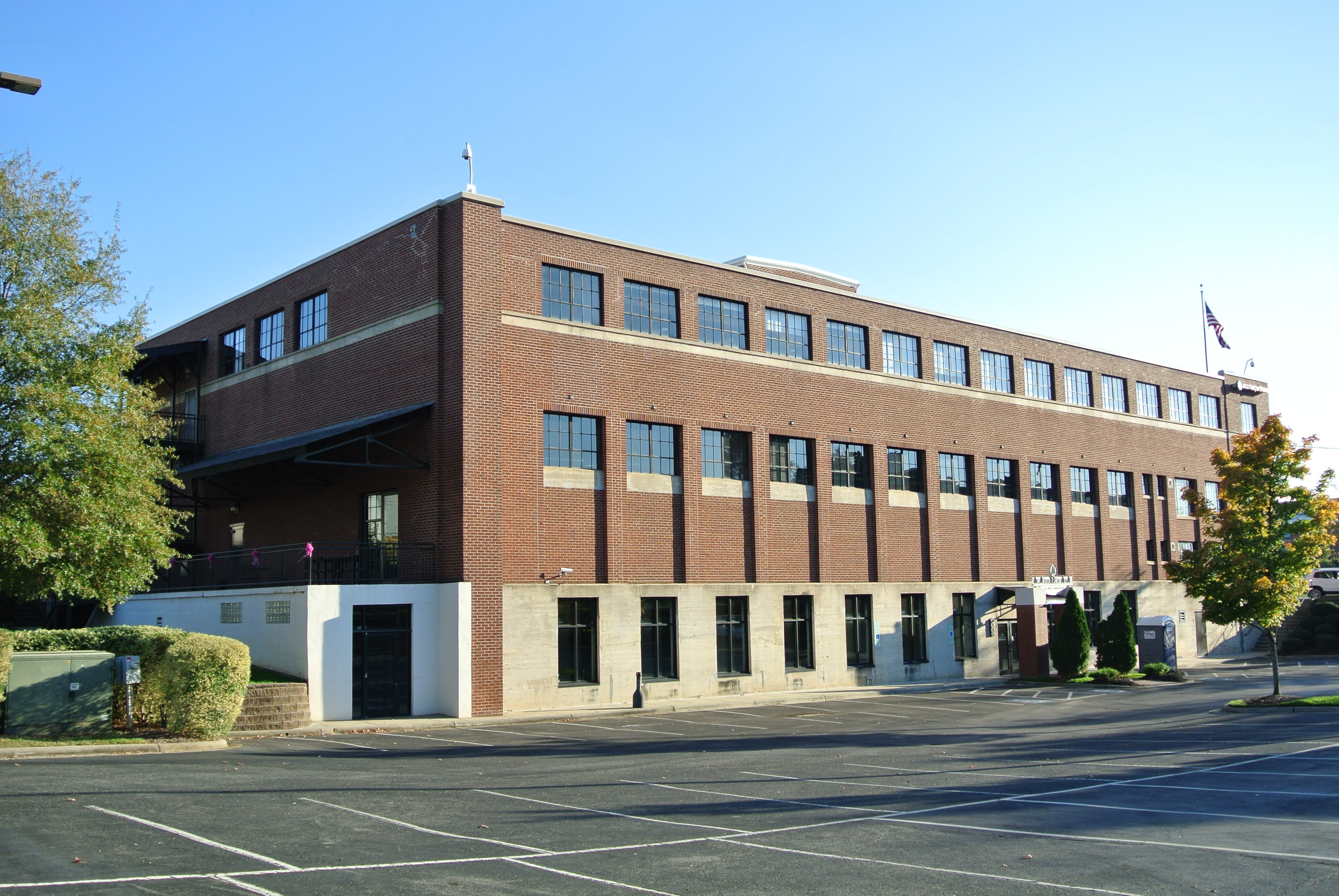
- Union Storage and Warehouse Company Building, October 2016

- Location within North Carolina Location within the United States
- Location: 1000 W. Morehead St., Charlotte, North Carolina
- Coordinates: 35°13′42″N 80°51′31″W
- Area: 1.2 acres (0.49 ha)
- Built: 1927
- Architectural style: Early Commercial
- NRHP reference No.: 00001640
- Added to NRHP: January 11, 2001

Union Storage and Warehouse Company Building is a historic warehouse building located at Charlotte, Mecklenburg County, North Carolina. It was built in 1927, and is a two-story, rectangular, reinforced concrete building on a raised concrete basement. The building has a red brick veneer, steel sash windows, and a parapet facade. The warehouse was purchased by the Ford Motor Company and converted to an auto repair establishment in 1942.

It was added to the National Register of Historic Places in 2000.
