= Philip Carey Building =

Historic building in North Carolina, US

- U.S. National Register of Historic Places
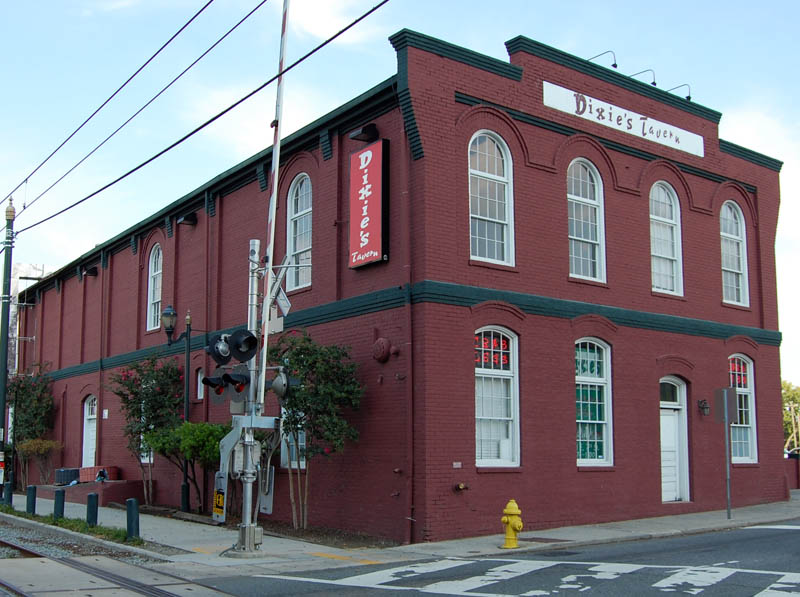
- Philip Carey Building, August 2008

- Location within North Carolina Location within the United States
- Location: 301 E. 7th St., Charlotte, North Carolina
- Coordinates: 35°13′39″N 80°50′23″W
- Area: less than one acre
- Built: 1907-1908
- Architectural style: Romanesque
- NRHP reference No.: 84002408
- Added to NRHP: March 1, 1984

Philip Carey Building is a historic warehouse building located at Charlotte, Mecklenburg County, North Carolina, USA. It was built in 1907–1908, and is a two-story, brick building with elaborate Victorian Romanesque-style brickwork.

It was added to the National Register of Historic Places in 1984.
