= Dr. Walter Pharr Craven House =

Historic house in North Carolina, United States

- U.S. National Register of Historic Places
- Location within North Carolina Location within the United States
- Location: 7648 Mt. Holly-Huntersville Rd., near Charlotte, North Carolina
- Coordinates: 35°20′47″N 80°53′47″W
- Area: 5 acres (2.0 ha)
- Built: 1888
- Architectural style: Vernacular Victorian
- MPS: Rural Mecklenburg County MPS
- NRHP reference No.: 90002187
- Added to NRHP: January 31, 1991

Dr. Walter Pharr Craven House is a historic home located near Charlotte, Mecklenburg County, North Carolina. The house was built about 1888, and is a two-story, vernacular Victorian style frame dwelling. It is associated with a small farm that supported the family of a country doctor. Also on the property are the contributing frame well canopy (1929), family Catholic chapel (c. 1910), central passage barn (c. 1920), log corn crib (c. 1888), tool shed (c. 1920), and auto-garage (c. 1920).

It was listed on the National Register of Historic Places in 1991.
