= Former Parks-Cramer Company Complex =

Historic building complex in North Carolina, US

- Parks-Cramer Company Complex, Former
- U.S. National Register of Historic Places
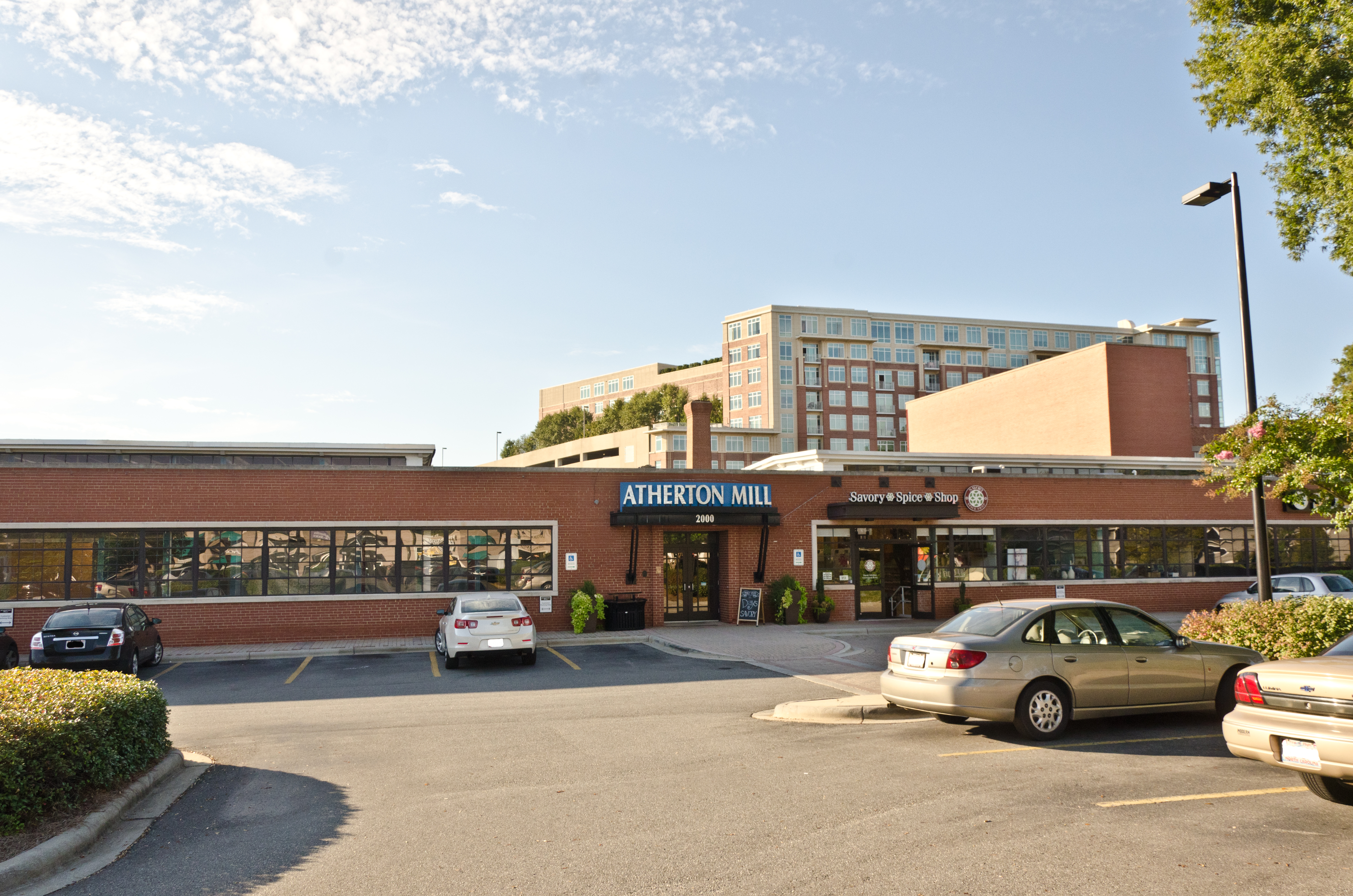
- Parks-Cramer Company Complex, Former, September 2014

- Location within North Carolina Location within the United States
- Location: 2000 South Blvd., Charlotte, North Carolina
- Coordinates: 35°12′35″N 80°51′40″W
- Area: 5.2 acres (2.1 ha)
- Built: 1919-1955
- Built by: Clement, E. H., & Co.
- Architectural style: Industrial functionalism
- NRHP reference No.: 94000146
- Added to NRHP: March 7, 1994

Former Parks-Cramer Company Complex is a historic factory complex located at Charlotte, Mecklenburg County, North Carolina. The contributing resources are the Manufacturing Building; Shipping, Receiving, and Pipe Storage building; storage building; and rail spur line and they were developed between 1919 and 1955. The Manufacturing Building is divided into six sections, and is a large one-story brick building with a flat roof and stepped parapets It features banks of large, steel-sash factory windows. The Parks-Cramer facility was one of the region's foremost manufacturers of humidifiers and air-conditioning equipment for the new cotton mills.

It was added to the National Register of Historic Places in 1994.
