= Pineville Mill Village Historic District =

Historic house in North Carolina, United States

- U.S. National Register of Historic Places
- U.S. Historic district
- Location within North Carolina Location within the United States
- Location: Roughly bounded by Dover, Price & Hill Sts., Lakeview Dr. & Eden Ct., Pineville, North Carolina
- Coordinates: 35°4′50″N 80°53′44″W
- Area: 40.22 acres (16.28 ha)
- Built: c. 1900
- Architectural style: Bungalow/Craftsman, mill houses
- NRHP reference No.: 11000511
- Added to NRHP: August 8, 2011

Pineville Mill Village Historic District is a national historic district located at Pineville, Mecklenburg County, North Carolina. The district encompasses 77 contributing buildings and 1 contributing site in a residential section of Pineville. It was developed after 1894 and in the 1920s and consists of frame, textile mill houses. The mill village was originally developed by the Dover Yarn Mills and later expanded by the Chadwick-Hoskins Company.

It was added to the National Register of Historic Places in 2011.
