= Speas Vinegar Company =

Historic building in North Carolina, US

- U.S. National Register of Historic Places
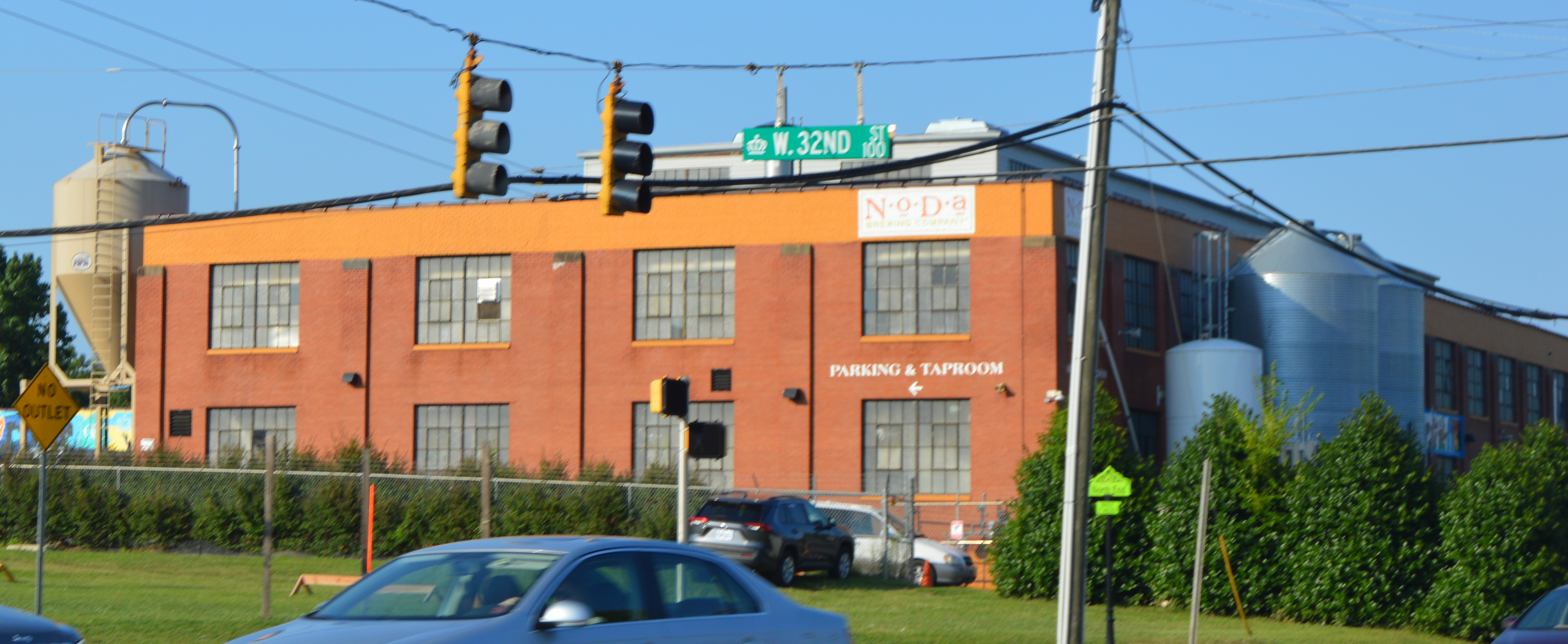
- Front and southern side

- Location within North Carolina Location within the United States
- Location: 2921 N. Tryon St., Charlotte, North Carolina
- Coordinates: 35°15′5″N 80°48′44″W
- Area: 2.61 acres (1.06 ha)
- Built: 1939
- NRHP reference No.: 15000530
- Added to NRHP: August 12, 2015

The Speas Vinegar Company is a historic industrial facility at 2921 North Tryon Street in Charlotte, North Carolina. The facility consists of a two-story brick manufacturing and office building, to which is attached a single-story brick warehouse. The building's principal decorative embellishments are brick pilasters separating the window bays, topped by cast stone caps. Built in 1939, it is a good local example of early 20th-century fireproof industrial construction. It was built by the Speas Vinegar Company, founded in 1888, and was operated by that company and its successors, H. J. Heinz and Fleischmann's Vinegar Company, until 1994.

The property was added to the National Register of Historic Places in 2015. Currently, the building is used by NoDa Brewing Company as a brewery and tasting room.
