= Philanthropic Hall, Davidson College =

- U.S. National Register of Historic Places
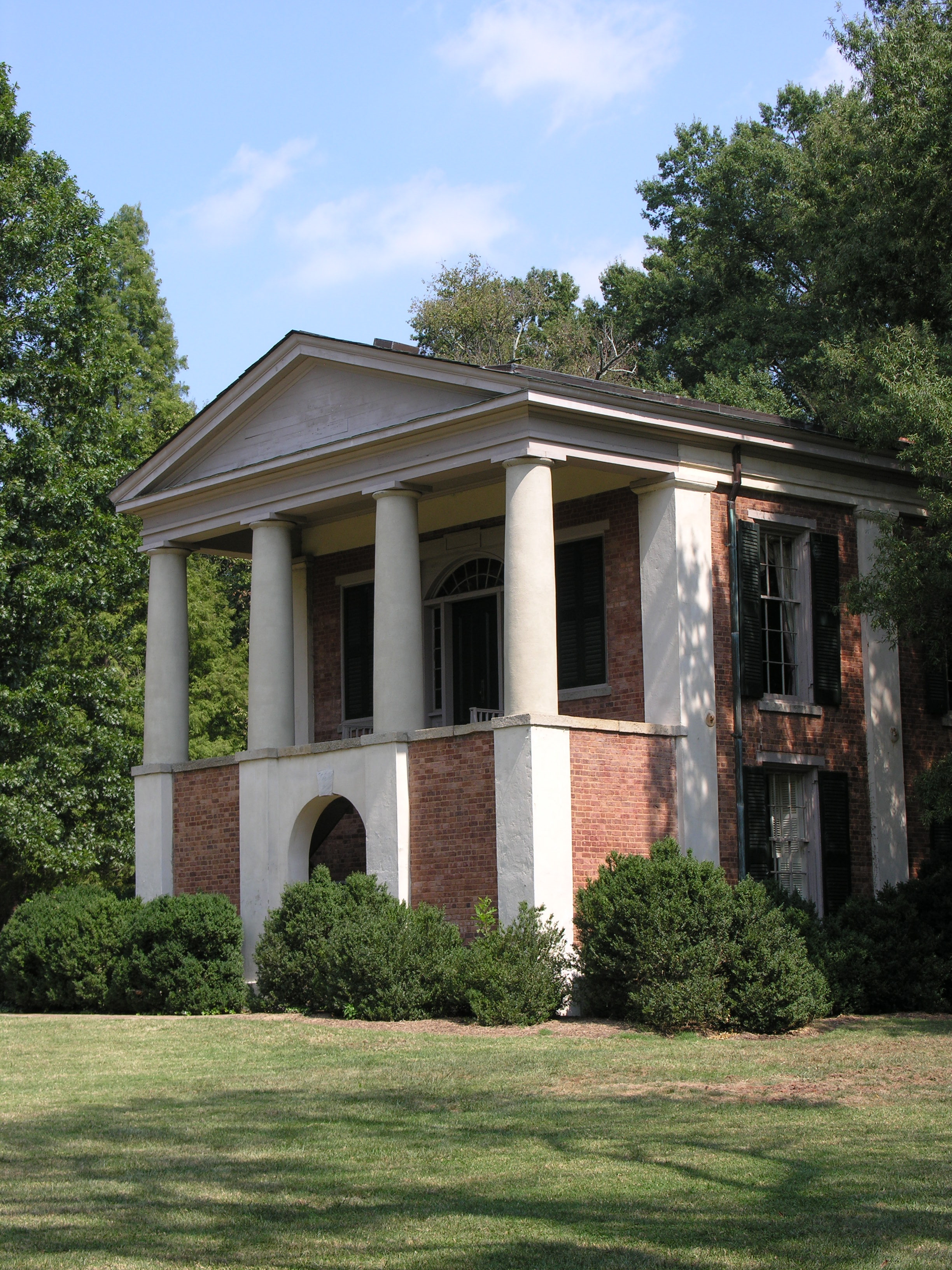
- Philanthropic Hall, 2005

- Location within North Carolina Location within the United States
- Location: Davidson College campus, Davidson, North Carolina
- Coordinates: 35°29′57″N 80°50′47″W
- Area: 0.8 acres (0.32 ha)
- Built: 1849-1850
- Architectural style: Greek Revival
- NRHP reference No.: 72000975
- Added to NRHP: April 13, 1972

Philanthropic Hall, Davidson College is a historic school building located on the campus of Davidson College at Davidson, Mecklenburg County, North Carolina. It was built by the Philanthropic Society, a literary and debating society.

It is a two-story, temple-form brick structure three bays wide and three bays long in the Greek Revival style. The front facade features a prostyle tetrastyle Doric order pedimented portico supported by four massive stuccoed brick columns. The brickwork is laid in Flemish bond. The building faces Eumenean Hall across the original quadrangle of Davidson College.

It was converted to office use in 1956. It was added to the National Register of Historic Places in 1972.
