= Grinnell Company-General Fire Extinguisher Company Complex =

Historic building complex in North Carolina, US

- Grinnell Company-General Fire Extinquisher Company Complex
- U.S. National Register of Historic Places
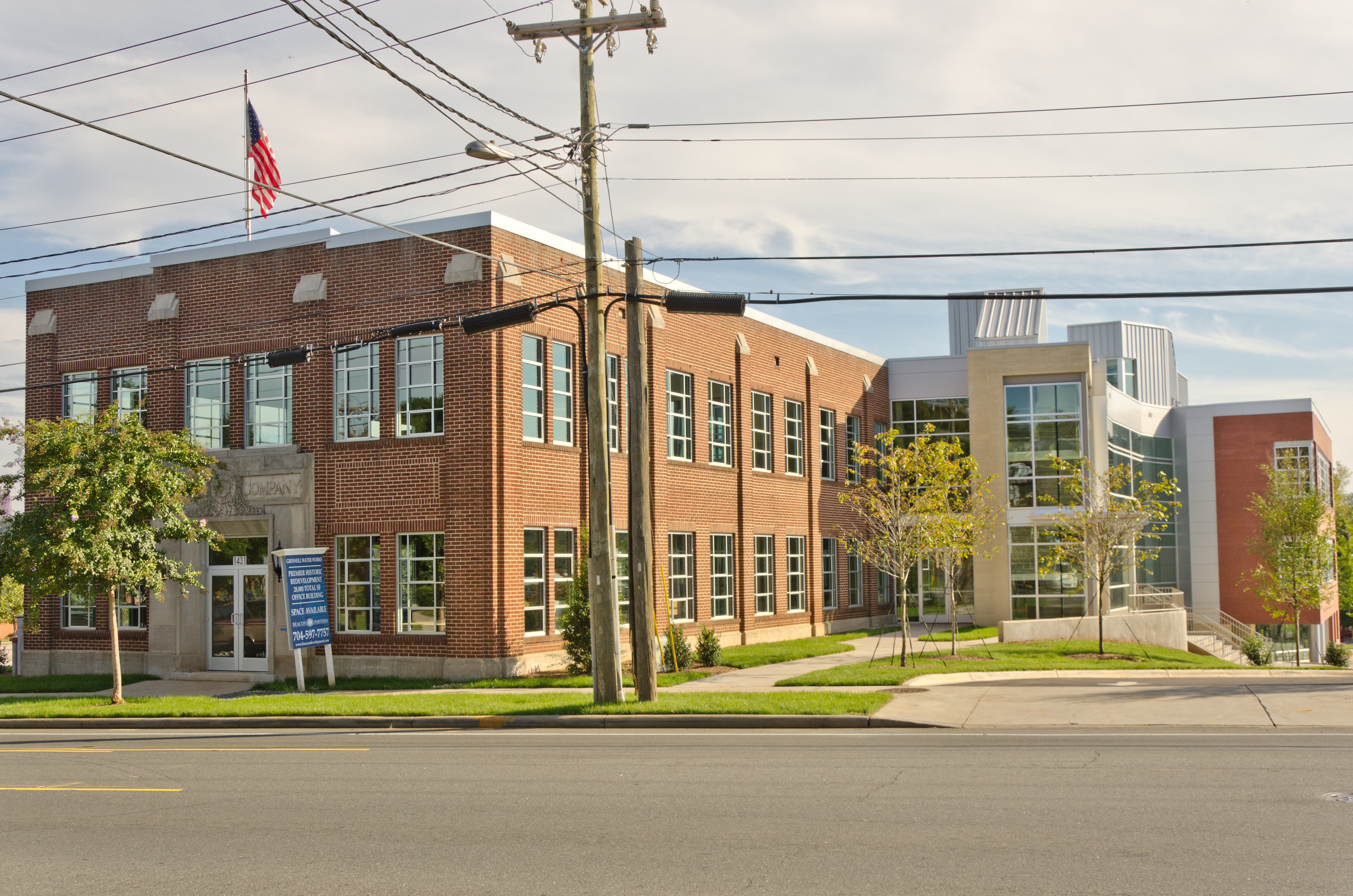
- Grinnell Company Office Building, September 2014

- Location within North Carolina Location within the United States
- Location: 1431 W. Morehead St., Charlotte, North Carolina
- Coordinates: 35°13′42″N 80°52′0″W
- Area: 1.7 acres (0.69 ha)
- Built: 1929-1930
- Architect: Sirrine, J.E.
- Architectural style: Early Commercial, Industrial
- NRHP reference No.: 03001275
- Added to NRHP: December 10, 2003

Grinnell Company-General Fire Extinguisher Company Complex is a historic factory complex located at Charlotte, Mecklenburg County, North Carolina. It was built in 1929–1930, and consists of a two-story office building and massive tall, one-story Grinnell manufacturing building. The office building is a reinforced concrete structure, with a brick veneer, a flat roof, and a parapet capped in concrete coping. The manufacturing building has a poured concrete slab foundation, brick veneered walls, a steel framing system consisting of I-beam piers and heavy Pratt truss roof, banks of continuous, steel sash windows, and large, sawtooth monitors. The complex was built for the largest manufacturer of automatic sprinklers and other fire protection products in North America.

It was added to the National Register of Historic Places in 2003.
