= Eumenean Hall, Davidson College =

Historic school building in North Carolina, US

- U.S. National Register of Historic Places
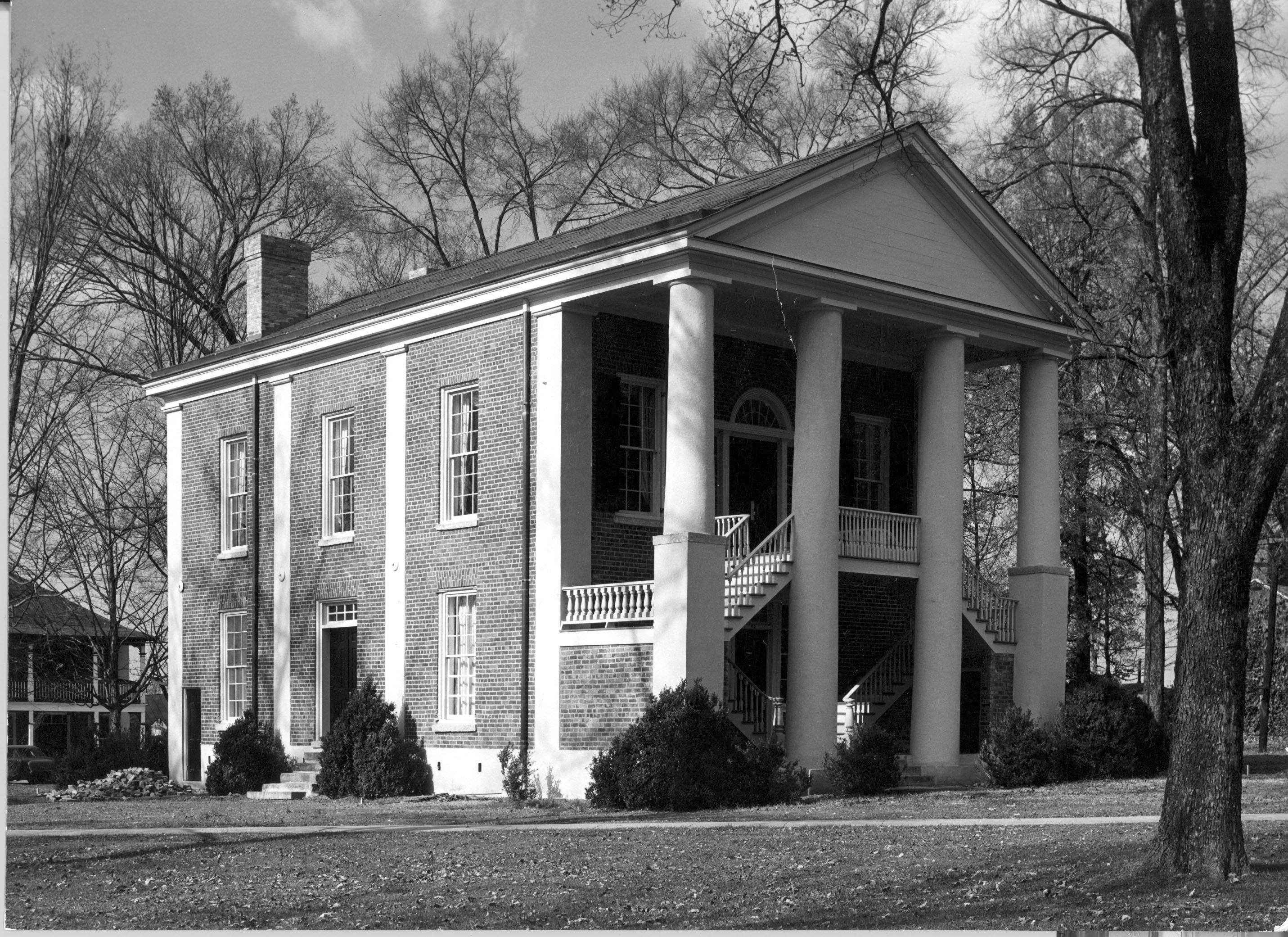
- Eumenean Hall, October 2011

- Location within North Carolina Location within the United States
- Location: Davidson College campus, Davidson, North Carolina
- Coordinates: 35°30′0″N 80°50′51″W
- Area: 0.5 acres (0.20 ha)
- Built: 1849
- Architect: Dinkins, Lewis; Alexander, Daniel
- Architectural style: Greek Revival
- NRHP reference No.: 72000974
- Added to NRHP: April 13, 1972

Eumenean Hall, Davidson College is a historic school building located on the campus of Davidson College at Davidson, Mecklenburg County, North Carolina. It was built in 1849 to serve as the meeting place of the Eumenean Society, a literary and debating society. It was added to the National Register of Historic Places in 1972.

== History ==
Eumenean Society is a literary and debating society that was established as the Polemic Debating Society on April 14, 1837 by students at Davidson College in Davidson, Mecklenburg County, North Carolina. It changed it name to Eumenean Society in 1838. It was the first student organization at Davidson. Membership in Eumenean or its competing Philanthropic Literary Society was a vital part of student life at Davidson in its early years.

Eumenean held frequent debates with Philanthropic and also developed a large library collection. By the early 1840s, both societies desired a hall for their libraries and as a meeting and debating space. Eumeanan Society raised funds for a building in the 1840s. The society selected its building site on December 14, 1848, and set a budget of $1,500. It hired contractors Lewis Dinkins and Daniel Alexander in 1849. However, it ran short of funds to complete its hall, as did the Philanthropic Society. Davidson's trustees provided the balance of the $2,500 need for construction ($96,750 in 2024).

Eumenean Hall was dedicated in November 1849. The group ordered blinds, furniture, and lightning rods in 1853 for $1,000. Woodrow Wilson, later president of the United States, joined the Eumenean Society in October 1873.

The importance of the campus debating societies waned in the late 19th and early 20th centuries. In the 21st century, Eumenean Hall is still used for Eumenean meetings, but is also used for classes and faculty offices.

The building was added to the National Register of Historic Places on April 13, 1972, as Eumenean Hall, Davidson College. The hall is also included in the Council of Independent Colleges Historic Campus Architecture Project.

== Architecture ==
Eumenean Hall is beside the campus chapel and faces Philanthropic Hall, across the original quadrangle of Davidson College. It is a two-story, temple-form brick structure three bays wide and three bays long in the Greek Revival style. Its front facade features a tetrastyle Doric order pedimented portico supported by four massive stuccoed brick columns. The building's upper level consists entirely of the main hall, which includes some of the hall's original furniture. It was renovated and restored in 1959.
