= List of botanical gardens and arboretums in North Carolina =

This list of botanical gardens and arboretums in North Carolina is intended to include all significant botanical gardens and arboretums in the U.S. state of North Carolina.

Name	Image	Affiliation	City	Coordinates
Airlie Gardens			Wilmington	34°12′54.36″N 77°49′40.44″W
Barred Owl Bend			Pittsboro	35°43′13″N 79°10′35″W
The Bog Garden			Greensboro	36°5′24.36″N 79°50′19.68″W
Asheville Botanical Garden		University of North Carolina	Asheville	35°36′46.8″N 82°34′1.2″W
Cape Fear Botanical Garden			Fayetteville	35°3′15.12″N 78°51′32.04″W
Cherokee Botanical Garden and Nature Trail			Cherokee	35°29′12.36″N 83°19′21.55″W
Coker Arboretum		University of North Carolina	Chapel Hill	35°54′49.5″N 79°2′56.3″W
Daniel Boone Native Gardens			Boone	36°12′31.32″N 81°40′14.88″W
Davidson College Arboretum		Davidson College	Davidson	35°30′0.72″N 80°50′46.32″W
De Hart Botanical Gardens		Louisburg College	Louisburg	36°01′25.8″N 78°21′15.1″W
Mariana H. Qubein Arboretum & Botanical Gardens		High Point University	High Point	35°58′26.85″N 79°59′43.78″W
Elon University Botanical Gardens		Elon University	Elon	36°06′26″N 79°30′05″W
Sarah P. Duke Gardens		Duke University	Durham	36°0′6.49″N 78°56′0.54″W
Greensboro Arboretum			Greensboro	36°4′12.36″N 79°50′28.68″W
Haywood Community College Arboretum		Haywood Community College	Clyde	35°31′39.18″N 82°55′49.55″W
William Lanier Hunt Arboretum		University of North Carolina	Chapel Hill	35°53′59.28″N 79°1′57″W
Juniper Level Botanic Gardens			Raleigh	35°37′34.32″N 78°38′22.56″W
New Hanover County Extension Service Arboretum			Wilmington	34°12′37.44″N 77°50′7.08″W
North Carolina Arboretum			Asheville	35°29′51.36″N 82°36′32.4″W
North Carolina Botanical Garden		University of North Carolina	Chapel Hill	35°53′57.71″N 79°2′1.98″W
JC Raulston Arboretum		North Carolina State University	Raleigh	35°47′40.2″N 78°41′56.76″W
Reynolda Gardens		Wake Forest University	Winston-Salem	36°7′29.28″N 80°17′3.12″W
Sandhills Horticultural Gardens		Sandhills Community College	Pinehurst	35°13′24.6″N 79°24′17.28″W
Daniel Stowe Conservancy			Belmont	35°10′4.8″N 81°3′28.08″W
Tanglewood Park Arboretum and Rose Garden			Clemmons	36°0′11.52″N 80°24′23.76″W
University of North Carolina at Charlotte Botanical Gardens		University of North Carolina	Charlotte	35°18′28.8″N 80°43′42.6″W
University of North Carolina at Wilmington Arboretum		University of North Carolina	Wilmington	34°13′35.76″N 77°52′40.97″W
Wing Haven Gardens and Bird Sanctuary			Charlotte	35°10′44.4″N 80°50′27.24″W

== See also ==
- List of botanical gardens and arboretums in the United States
