= Timeline of Charlotte, North Carolina =

Coordinates: 35.226944°N 80.843333°W

The following is a timeline of the history of Charlotte, North Carolina, United States.

== Prior to 19th century ==
- 1763 – Mecklenburg County established.
- 1768 – Charlotte Town incorporated.
- 1770 – Queen's Museum chartered.
- 1774 – Charlotte becomes capital of county.
- 1775 – Mecklenburg Resolves signed.
- 1777 – Liberty Hall Academy incorporated.
- 1780 – Battle of Charlotte fought.

== 19th century ==
- 1835 – Charlotte Journal newspaper begins publication.
- 1837 – Charlotte Mint opens.
- 1850 – William F. Davidson becomes mayor.
- 1852
  - Railway begins operating.
  - Western Democrat newspaper begins publication.
- 1857
  - Charlotte Female Institute established.
  - YMCA becomes active.
  - Gas lighting in use.
- 1858 – Charlotte Military Academy established.
- 1867 – Biddle Memorial Institute founded.
- 1875 – Charlotte public schools established.
- 1880 – Population: 7,084.
- 1886 – Charlotte Chronicle newspaper begins publication.
- 1887
  - Electric lighting in use.
  - Charlotte Fire Department founded.
- 1888 – The Charlotte News begins publication.
- 1890 – Charlotte Post newspaper begins publication.
- 1891
  - City hall built.
  - Charlotte Literary and Library Association organized.
  - Latta Park established
- 1897 – Elizabeth College established.

== 20th century ==
- 1903 – Charlotte Carnegie Public Library opens.
- 1905
  - Brevard Street Library for Negroes opens.
  - Southern Power Company incorporated.
- 1908 – Union National Bank founded.
- 1915 – Temple Israel built.
- 1921 – WBT radio begins broadcasting.
- 1924
  - Hotel Charlotte opens.
  - Radiator Specialty Company founded.
- 1930
  - Population: 82,675
  - Work started to create Bryant Park
- 1932 – Charlotte Symphony Orchestra formed.
- 1933 – WSOC radio begins broadcasting.
- 1935 – Charlotte Municipal Airport established.
- 1936 – Mint Museum opens.
- 1940 – Population: 100,899.
- 1946 – Charlotte Center of the University of North Carolina opens.
- 1947 – The Unitarian Universalist Church of Charlotte founded.
- 1949 – WBTV (television) begins broadcasting.
- 1950 – Population: 134,042.
- 1955 – Ovens Auditorium opens.
- 1957
  - WSOC-TV (television) begins broadcasting.
  - American Commercial Bank formed.
- 1960 – Population: 201,564.
- 1961 – Stan Brookshire becomes mayor.
- 1966 – Charlotte Botanical Gardens established.
- 1967 – WCNC-TV begins broadcasting.
- 1968 – Bartlett Tree Research Laboratories Arboretum established.
- 1970
  - SouthPark Mall opens.
  - Population: 241,178.
- 1971 – U.S. Supreme Court decides Swann v. Charlotte-Mecklenburg Board of Education, approving racial desegregation busing.
- 1973 – Carowinds Monorail begins operating.
- 1974 – Airplane accident.
- 1976 – Afro-American Cultural Center established.
- 1980 – Population: 314,447.
- 1982 – Heroes Convention (comic books) begins.
- 1983 – Harvey Gantt becomes mayor.
- 1985 – Metrolina Theatre Association established.
- 1986
  - Opera Carolina formed.
  - Airplane accident.
- 1987 – WJZY begins broadcasting.
- 1988
  - Charlotte Hornets begins play.
  - Charlotte Knights franchise established.
- 1989 – Hurricane Hugo.
- 1990 — Population: 395,934.
- 1991
  - Blockbuster Pavilion opens.
  - Museum of the New South incorporated.
- 1992
  - North Carolina Blumenthal Performing Arts Center opens.
  - Carolina Actors Studio Theatre and Carolinas Aviation Museum founded.
- 1993
  - City government computer network begins operating.
  - Mel Watt becomes U.S. representative for North Carolina's 12th congressional district.
- 1994
  - WMYT-TV begins broadcasting.
  - Airplane accident.
  - Charlotte's Web Community Network online.
- 1995
  - Pat McCrory becomes mayor.
  - Charlotte Convention Center and Tremont Music Hall open.
  - City website online.
  - Carolina Panthers began play as first NFL team in the Carolinas
- 1997 – Loomis Fargo Bank Robbery.
- 1998 – Bank of America formed.
- 1999 – Federal court ends mandated racial integration in schools via busing.

== 21st century ==
=== 2000s ===
- 2000 – Population: 540,828.
- 2002 – ConCarolinas begins.
- 2003 – Airplane accident.
- 2004
  - Slow Food Charlotte founded.
  - Street Soccer USA headquartered in city.
- 2005 – Charlotte Bobcats Arena and ImaginOn open.
- 2007
  - Lynx Blue Line light rail begins operating.
  - Billy Graham Library opens.
- 2009 – Anthony Foxx becomes mayor.

=== 2010s ===
- 2010
  - NASCAR Hall of Fame and Bechtler Museum of Modern Art open.
  - Population: 731,424.
- 2011 – Occupy Charlotte begins.
- 2012
  - Little Sugar Creek Greenway built.
  - Democratic National Convention held in Charlotte.
- 2013
  - Robert Pittenger becomes U.S. representative for North Carolina's 9th congressional district.
  - Population: 792,862.
- 2014 – Alma Adams becomes U.S. representative for North Carolina's 12th congressional district.
- 2015 – Population: 827,121 (estimate).
- 2016 – September: Protests and unrest following the shooting of Keith Lamont Scott leave several police officers wounded, and a civilian shot.

== See also ==
- History of Charlotte
- Mayor of Charlotte, North Carolina (list)
- List of Charlotte neighborhoods
- Mecklenburg County history
- National Register of Historic Places listings in Mecklenburg County, North Carolina
- List of tallest buildings in Charlotte
- Timelines of other cities in North Carolina: Asheville, Durham, Fayetteville, Greensboro, Raleigh, Wilmington, Winston-Salem

== Bibliography ==
Published in 19th century

- Chataigne's Charlotte Business Directory 1875–76, J.H. Chataigne, 1875

Published in 20th century

- Daniel Augustus Tompkins (1903), History of Mecklenburg County and the city of Charlotte, from 1740 to 1903, Charlotte, N.C: Observer Print. House, OL 23304731M
- Walsh's Charlotte, North Carolina City Directory, Charleston, S.C.: Walsh Directory Co., 1907
- Charlotte, North Carolina city directory: 1911, Asheville, N.C: Piedmont Directory Co., 1911, OL 13510683M
- Charlotte, North Carolina city directory: 1925, Asheville, N.C: Miller Press, 1925
- Miller's Charlotte, North Carolina city directory: 1931, Detroit: Piedmont Directory Co., 1931
- Federal Writers’ Project (1939). "Charlotte". North Carolina: A Guide to the Old North State. American Guide Series. p. 158+ – via Internet Archive. + Chronology
- Janette Thomas Greenwood. "Bittersweet legacy: The black and white 'better classes' in Charlotte, North Carolina, 1850-1910" (PhD dissertation, U of Virginia; ProQuest Dissertations & Theses, 1991. 9219286). online at academic libraries.
- George Thomas Kurian (1994), "Charlotte, North Carolina", World Encyclopedia of Cities, vol. 1: North America, Santa Barbara, Calif.: ABC-CLIO, OL 1431653M (fulltext via Open Library)
- Thomas W. Hanchett (1998). Sorting Out the New South City: Race, Class, and Urban Development in Charlotte, 1875–1975. University of North Carolina Press. ISBN 978-0-8078-4677-3.
- "The South: North Carolina: Charlotte", USA, Let's Go, New York: St. Martin's Press, 1999, OL 24937240M

Published in 21st century

- Vermelle Diamond Ely; Grace Hoey Drain; Amy Rogers (2001). Charlotte, North Carolina. Black America. Charleston, South Carolina: Arcadia.
- Catherine Maddison (2007). "Charlotte, North Carolina". In David Goldfield (ed.). Encyclopedia of American Urban History. Sage. pp. 134–136. ISBN 978-1-4522-6553-7.
- Hunter Bacot (2012), "Civic culture as a policy premise: appraising Charlotte's civic culture", in Laura A. Reese and Raymond A. Rosenfeld (ed.), Comparative Civic Culture: the Role of Local Culture in Urban Policy-Making, Burlington, VT: Ashgate, ISBN 978-1-4094-3654-6
- Raj Chetty; Nathaniel Hendren (2015), City Rankings, Commuting Zones: Causal Effects of the 100 Largest Commuting Zones on Household Income in Adulthood, Equality of Opportunity Project, Harvard University, archived from the original on May 6, 2015, "Rank #97: Charlotte, North Carolina"
