= Henry Roland Totten =

Henry Roland Totten (November 6, 1892 - February 9, 1974) was an American botanist.

== Biography ==
Totten was born in North Carolina on November 6, 1892. He was the son of William Theophilus Totten of Rockingham County, North Carolina, minister, educator, and president of Yadkin Collegiate Institute (later Yadkin College) for twenty-six years.

Totten graduated from University of North Carolina at Chapel Hill in 1913 and completed his graduate work under William Chambers Coker. His academic career was spent as a faculty member of the Botany Department for fifty years, teaching general botany, dendrology, pharmacognosy, and plant taxonomy at the University of North Carolina at Chapel Hill. He assisted Coker in the establishment of the Coker Arboretum in 1903. The university completed the Totten Center, named for him, in 1976 as the first permanent building in the North Carolina Botanical Garden.

Totten was a member of many scientific societies and the author of The Plant Life of Hartsville, S. C. (1912); The Trees of North Carolina (with William Coker) (1916). Besides these he contributed numerous articles on morphology and botany to scientific journals. A hybrid oak, Quercus x totteni, was named in his honor. A specimen currently grows near the front entrance to the Totten Center at the North Carolina Botanical Garden. He died on February 9, 1974.

The standard author abbreviation Totten is used to indicate this person as the author when citing a botanical name.
