= Elizabeth Lawrence =

Elizabeth Lawrence may refer to:

- Elizabeth Bury (1644–1720), née Lawrence, English diarist
- Eliza Lawrence (1935–2016), politician in the Northwest Territories
- Elizabeth Lawrence (actress) (1922–2000), American Broadway and film actress
- Elizabeth Lawrence (writer) (1904–1985), American garden writer and landscape architect

== See also ==
- Elizabeth Lawrence House and Garden, a historic home and garden located at Charlotte, Mecklenburg County, North Carolina
- Elizabeth Township, Lawrence County, Ohio, United States
- Elizabeth Laurence (born 1949), English classical mezzo-soprano singer
