= Bryant Park (disambiguation) =

Bryant Park is a privately managed public park located in the New York City borough of Manhattan.

- 42nd Street–Bryant Park/Fifth Avenue station serves the park.

Bryant Park may also refer to:

- Bryant Park (Charlotte, North Carolina), a park in Charlotte, North Carolina
- Bryant Creek State Park, a Missouri state park in Douglas County in southern Missouri
- Bryant Park, Kodaikanal, a park in Tamil Nadu, India

== See also ==
- Bryant Park Project, a defunct radio news magazine from National Public Radio
