= Murder of Suellen Evans =

Unsolved murder of college student

Suellen Evans
- Born: Suellen Evans; April 1, 1944
- Died: June 30, 1965 (aged 21); Coker Arboretum, University of North Carolina, Chapel Hill, North Carolina
- Cause of death: Stabbing, exsanguination
- Education: University of North Carolina at Chapel Hill

Suellen Evans (April 1, 1944 – June 30, 1965) was a college student taking summer courses at the University of North Carolina at Chapel Hill (UNC) who was stabbed and slashed to death at the campus' Coker Arboretum when she fought off a rape attempt. The killer has never been identified, and investigations have gone cold over the years, the murder having a lasting impact on the community and local police force. Renewed interest was brought into the investigation of Evans' murder by more recent murders of female students at the same university, specifically Eve Carson and Faith Hedgepeth, and the police are asking the public for information leading to answers and even the killer(s) responsible.

== Background ==
Suellen Evans was from Mooresville, North Carolina. Her father Glenn was a postman. She primarily attended Catawba College in Salisbury, studying home economics, and hoped to be a teacher. Evans was taking summer classes at UNC to get the remaining credits she needed for her acceptance at the University of North Carolina at Greensboro.

== Murder and investigation ==
Shortly after midday, on Friday, June 30, 1965, Evans left class and went to speak with a friend, and later one of her professors. She then proceeded to take a detour through the Coker Arboretum to get to her dorms, as she was packing up for a trip back to her hometown. It was a path Evans was reported to have taken often. She was grabbed by an unseen assailant hiding behind the plant life where she was walking. The assailant tried to rape her under a crape myrtle, but Evans resisted. The attacker pulled out a pocket knife, stabbing her twice in the neck, once in her heart. Evans collapsed, and the attacker fled with the weapon in hand.

Although there were no known direct witnesses, two female students and two nuns heard her screams and came upon the scene shortly after the attack. When questioning what happened to her, she muttered her last words, "He tried to rape me. I believe I'm going to faint." One of the nuns attempted mouth-to-mouth resuscitation, but Evans was pronounced dead on arrival at Memorial Hospital. The police responded within minutes, barricading the areas and ordering their bloodhounds to track scents, but the killer escaped.

Dozens of suspects were questioned in the ensuing manhunt, ranging as far as Chicago and Texas and involving university and district police under then-chief William D. Blake, as well as the state bureau. Scrapings were taken from Evans' fingernails, and her clothes and books were sent to the bureau to check for evidence. A gardener matching the description of the suspect was questioned, but he fainted regularly during questioning and was subsequently released with little to hold him on. A janitor reported he saw a boy running out from the botanical gardens at the scene, but there was never a boy located. Suspects were often released due to having no wounds from Evans fighting the killer off. Reports publicized at the time have stated the attacker to be black based on eyewitness accounts, but this has especially as of recent no longer been considered a popularly accepted lead and is barely reiterated in current reports.

Around 200 men volunteered to scour the gardens for the murder weapon, which came up empty. The Dean of Women urged female students to never walk alone in the arboretum. The FBI was considered for the investigation, but there were no further mentions afterward. A reward fund for information gathered by students eventually amounted to as much as today's value of $10,000.

== Reignited attention ==
Evans' murder received more attention after the murders of other young college women at UNC, most notably Eve Carson and Faith Hedgepeth, the latter of whom was also recognized as a murdered Indigenous woman hailing from the Haliwa-Saponi people. Orange County Sheriff Lindy Pendergrass spoke to local news outlets in recent reports, as he served on the force in Chapel Hill at the time of the murder. The Raleigh, North Carolina regional newspaper, The News & Observer, has published their own articles in the hopes of gaining renewed public interest in the murder of Evans and other state cold cases. Evans' killer remains still unidentified.

== See also ==
- List of unsolved murders (1900–1979)
