= Botanical Society of America =

US learned scientific organization for plants

- Abbreviation: BSA
- Formation: 1893
- Type: Non-profit; NGO
- Purpose: "Promote botany, the field of basic science dealing with the study and inquiry into the form, function, development, diversity, reproduction, evolution, and uses of plants and their interactions within the biosphere."
- Headquarters: St. Louis, Missouri, United States
- Members: 3,059
- President: Andrea Wolfe (2017–2020)
- President Elect: Linda Watson (2018–2021)
- Budget: $1.63 million
- Website: www.botany.org

The Botanical Society of America (BSA) represents professional and amateur botanists, researchers, educators and students in over 80 countries of the world. It functions as a United States nonprofit 501(c)(3) membership society.

== History ==
The society was first established in 1893 as an outgrowth from the Botanical Club of the American Association for the Advancement of Science at a meeting in Rochester, New York, on August 22, 1892. The organizing principles of the society were the enhancement of the study of plants in North America and to professionalize such efforts. In 1906, the organization merged with the Society for Plant Morphology and Physiology and the American Mycological Society.

== Sections ==
The society has 16 special interest sections:

- Bryological and lichenological
- Developmental and Structural
- Ecological
- Economic
- Genetics
- Historical
- Microbiological
- Mycological
- Paleobotanical
- Phycological
- Physiological
- Phytochemical
- Pteridological
- Systematic
- Teaching
- Tropical biology

== Former presidents ==
Former presidents of the society have included:

- William Trelease - Director of the Missouri Botanical Garden and the first president of the society
- Nathaniel Lord Britton - Cofounder of the New York Botanical Garden
- Margaret Clay Ferguson - Head of the Department of Botany at Wellesley College and the first female president of the society
- William Francis Ganong - Professor of Botany, Smith College and historian and cartographer of New Brunswick
- Albert S. Hitchcock - Chief Botanist for the USDA
- William Chambers Coker - Founder of the Coker Arboretum at the University of North Carolina
- Katherine Esau - National Medal of Science recipient and namesake of the Katherine Esau Award in structural and developmental biology
- Vernon Cheadle - Chancellor of the University of California, Santa Barbara
- G. Ledyard Stebbins − evolutionary biologist at the University of California, Davis
- Peter H. Raven - Director of the Missouri Botanical Garden
- Loren Rieseberg - Professor of Botany at the University of British Columbia

== Publications ==
The society publishes the following scientific journals:

- American Journal of Botany, since 1914
- Plant Science Bulletin, since 1955
- Applications in Plant Sciences, since 2009
