= Wing Haven Gardens and Bird Sanctuary =

Gardens in Charlotte, North Carolina, USA

Wing Haven
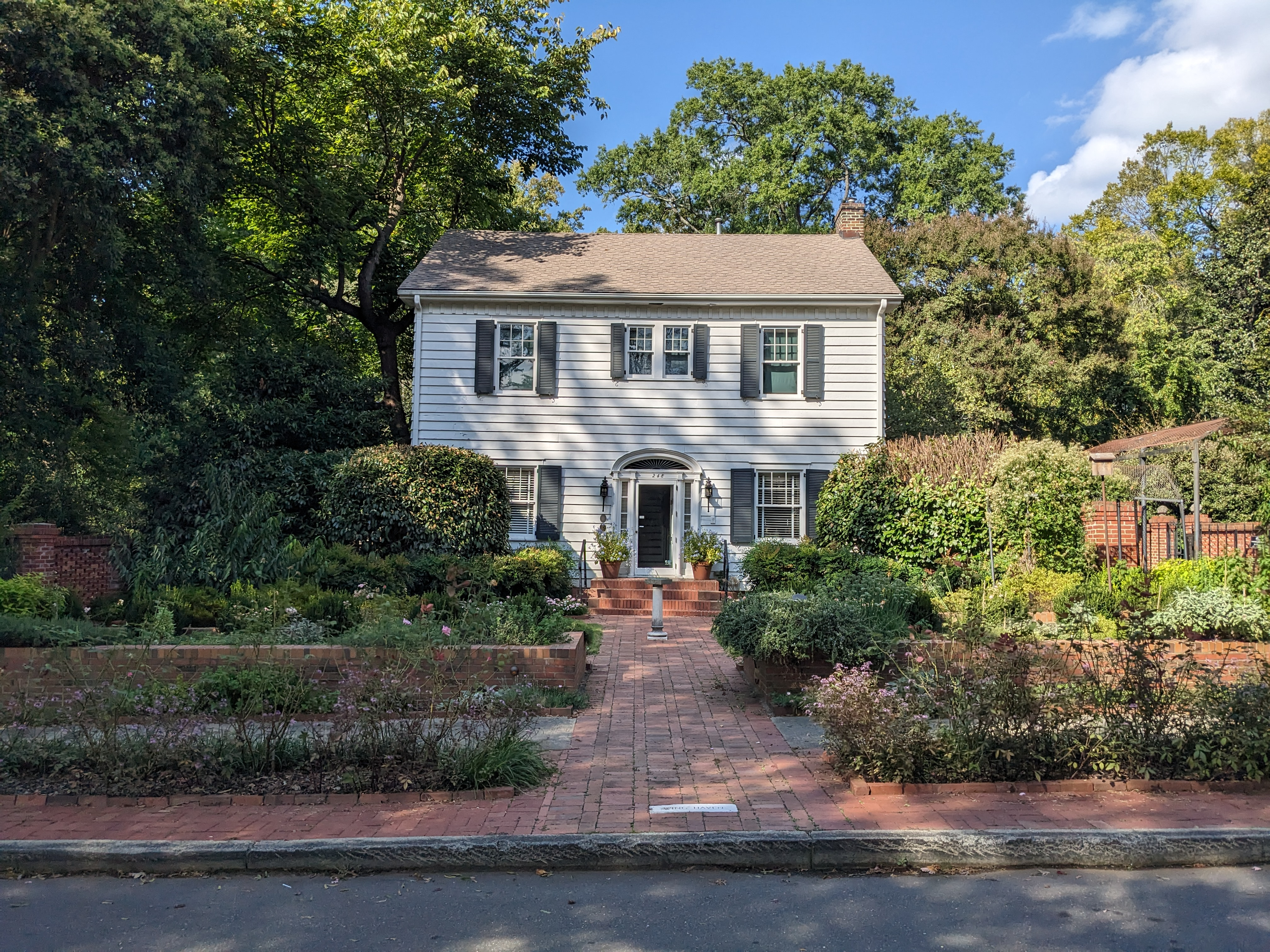
- Interactive map of Wing Haven
- Type: Bird sanctuary
- Location: 248 Ridgewood Avenue; Charlotte, NC, United States
- Coordinates: 35.1790°N 80.8409°W
- Area: 2.97 acres (1.20 ha)
- Created: 1927
- Operator: Wing Haven Foundation
- Open: All year
- Website: winghavengardens.org

Wing Haven Gardens and Bird Sanctuary is a garden and habitat for birds and wildlife located in Charlotte, North Carolina. It includes the Elizabeth Lawrence House & Garden, which is the site of a garden writer’s living laboratory. The site also includes the SEED Wildlife & Children’s Gardens, which provides hands-on exploratory learning and a natural habitat for local wildlife.

== History ==
Wing Haven Gardens & Bird Sanctuary was established in 1927 by Elizabeth and Edwin Clarkson.

In 1971, the couple donated the garden and house to the Wing Haven Foundation. The Clarksons remained in the home until 1988.

Wing Haven's original Clarkson Garden is the Charlotte area's only designated garden and bird sanctuary listed as a local historic landmark by the Charlotte-Mecklenburg Historic Landmark Commission, certified as Wildlife Habitat by the National Wildlife Federation, and named an eBird hotspot by the Cornell Lab of Ornithology and the National Audubon Society. There have been over 150 species of birds sighted at the property.

In 2008, Wing Haven purchased the Elizabeth Lawrence House & Garden at 348 Ridgewood Avenue. Noted author and landscape architect Elizabeth Lawrence lived in the home when she moved to Charlotte. The house and garden is listed on the National Register of Historic Places, in the Smithsonian Institution's Archives of American Gardens, and as one of only 15 Preservation Partner Gardens of the Garden Conservancy.

In 2018, Wing Haven added the Student Environmental Education and Discovery (SEED) Wildlife Garden.

== The Grounds ==
The garden plan for Wing Haven Garden & Bird Sanctuary resembles a Cross of Lorraine with its long path crossed by two shorter, perpendicular paths, and the house sited between the shorter paths. It contains a number of pools, fountains and variety of trees, shrubs, and flowers. The garden also contains an English sundial from 1705, various terra cotta pieces, and dozens of plaques. One plaque features a poem by Japanese pacifist and reformer Toyohiko Kagawa. The garden also features a statue of Saint Fiacre, patron saint of gardeners.

=== Trees ===
Wing Haven harbors several champion trees. In 2013, a Tulip Poplar (Liriodendron tulipifera) at a diameter of 67 in., height of 130 ft. and a spread of 50 ft. became a Treasure Tree and Jewel of the Queen's Crown as awarded by the North Carolina Cooperative Extension Service, who started the formal Treasure Tree program in Mecklenburg County. The Elizabeth Lawrence Garden's Japanese Stewartia (Stewartia pseudocamellia) is one of the original trees of the Treasure Tree Program and is the largest recorded Japanese Stewartia in Mecklenburg County. In 2000, Wing Haven Garden & Bird Sanctuary's Pin Chastetree (Vitex agnus-castus) was nominated as the nation's largest specimen of its species growing in the United States. It was surpassed in 2009 by a specimen in Texas.

== See also ==
- List of botanical gardens and arboretums in North Carolina
