= Lactarius subtorminosus =

Scientific classification
- Domain: Eukaryota
- Kingdom: Fungi
- Division: Basidiomycota
- Class: Agaricomycetes
- Order: Russulales
- Family: Russulaceae
- Genus: Lactarius
- Species: L. subtorminosus

Binomial name
- Lactarius subtorminosus Coker (1918)

Species of fungus

Lactarius subtorminosus is a member of the "milk-cap" genus Lactarius in the order Russulales. Described as new to science by William Chambers Coker in 1918, it is known from North America. The whitish to cream-colored cap reaches 5–6 cm (2.0–2.4 in) in diameter and is tomentose, with margins folded inward. The gills are packed closely together, and are cream when mature. Gills that are cut will first turn pink then light brown. The stem is about 1.5 cm (0.6 in) long and 1.1–1.5 cm (0.4–0.6 in) thick, white overall with a few cream dots, and covered with a dense layer of small hairs. When cut or injured, the fruit bodies will ooze a sparse whitish latex with a taste similar to cypress wood. The spores are roughly spherical, warted, and measure 5.8–6.5 by 6.5–7 μm. Lactarius subtorminosus may be distinguished from the similar L. torminosus by its milder latex and smaller spores.

== See also ==
- List of Lactarius species
