= Doan Ogden =

American landscape architect

Doan R. Ogden (1908–1989) born in Wildwood, Michigan was a nationally noted landscape architect during the 20th century. Most of his recognizable garden landscapes are in North Carolina. He moved to North Carolina to teach at Warren Wilson College, then known as the Farm School, after he graduated from Michigan State University. Ogden designed gardens and landscapes throughout the region, including the Botanical Gardens at Asheville near the University of North Carolina at Asheville and the Daniel Boone Native Gardens. He was celebrated for being one of the first landscape architects to effectively and aesthetically incorporate native species into the natural design of his gardens. He also did landscaping for notable private homes, banks, shopping centers, supermarkets, hospitals, office buildings, physicians' offices and dozens of other public buildings. In 1975 he was awarded the Blue Ridge Regional Green Bronze Medal of the Men's Garden Clubs of America. On May 21, 1989 he died at his home located in Kenilworth of Asheville, NC.
