= William Chambers Coker =

American botanist and mycologist (1872–1953)

- Born: October 24, 1872; Hartsville, South Carolina
- Died: June 27, 1953 (aged 80)
- Education: South Carolina College (BS 1894); Johns Hopkins University (PhD 1901)
- Known for: Establishing the Coker Arboretum
- Spouse: Louise Venable (m. 1934)
- Scientific career
- Fields: Botany; Mycology
- Workplaces: University of North Carolina at Chapel Hill (1902–1945)
- Thesis: On the Gametophytes and Embryo of Taxodium (1901)
- Academic advisors: Duncan S. Johnson

William Chambers Coker (October 24, 1872 – June 27, 1953) was an American botanist and mycologist. He established the Coker Arboretum at the University of North Carolina at Chapel Hill, where he was a named chair professor of botany and a chair of the botany department, and he served as president of the Botanical Society of America in 1924.

== Early life and education ==
Coker was born in Hartsville, South Carolina on October 24, 1872. Coker was the third of seven children, of the businessman James Lide Coker; he was the brother of agriculturalist David Robert Coker.

He graduated from South Carolina College in 1894 with a BS and then worked at Atlantic National Bank in Wilmington, North Carolina, rising to vice president in 1896, until returning to academia in 1897. Next he earned a PhD at Johns Hopkins University in 1901 with a study of the plant embryonic development of bald cypress under Duncan S. Johnson, titled On the Gametophytes and Embryo of Taxodium. After his PhD, he studied in Bonn, Germany with Eduard Strasburger 1901–1902.

== Career ==
Coker taught for several years in the summer schools of the Brooklyn Institute of Arts and Sciences and at Cold Spring Harbor, New York, then in 1902 became associate professor of botany at the University of North Carolina at Chapel Hill (UNC). He established the Coker Arboretum in 1903. He was made professor in 1907 and Kenan professor of botany in 1920. He served as chair of the department of botany for 36 years and retired from teaching in 1945. He also served as chairman of the UNC's Buildings and Grounds Committee for 30 years.

Coker was a member of many scientific societies and the author of The Plant Life of Hartsville, S. C. (1912); The Trees of North Carolina (with Henry Roland Totten) (1916); The Saprolegniaceae of the United States (1921); and Trees of the Southeastern States (1934). Besides these he contributed over one hundred articles on morphology and botany to scientific journals. In 1903, he was chief of the botanic staff of the Bahama Expedition of the Geographical Society of Baltimore. He was editor of the Journal of the Elisha Mitchell Scientific Society 1904–1945.

He was a fellow of the American Association for the Advancement of Science and served as president of the Botanical Society of America in 1924. He is honored in the name of Cokeromyces, which is a pathogenic fungus.

== Personal life and death ==
Coker married Louise Manning Venable, a daughter of University of North Carolina at Chapel Hill (UNC) president Francis Preston Venable, on October 28, 1934.

He died on June 27, 1953. His papers were collected at the UNC library.

== Species described ==
- Lactarius subtorminosus Coker (1918)
- Multifurca furcata (Coker) Buyck & V. Hofstetter (2008) – as Lactarius furcatus
