= Daniel Boone Arboretum =

Arboretum in Harrogate, Tennessee, United States

- Type: Arboretum
- Location: Harrogate, Tennessee

Daniel Boone Arboretum is an arboretum located along a portion of the Daniel Boone Greenway in Harrogate, Tennessee.

The arboretum contains over 60 labeled species of native trees and includes a 4-mile trail for walking or biking.

== See also ==
- Daniel Boone Native Gardens (Boone, North Carolina)
- List of botanical gardens in the United States
