= Davidson College =

Private college in Davidson, North Carolina, US

Coordinates: 35.499990°N 80.845296°W

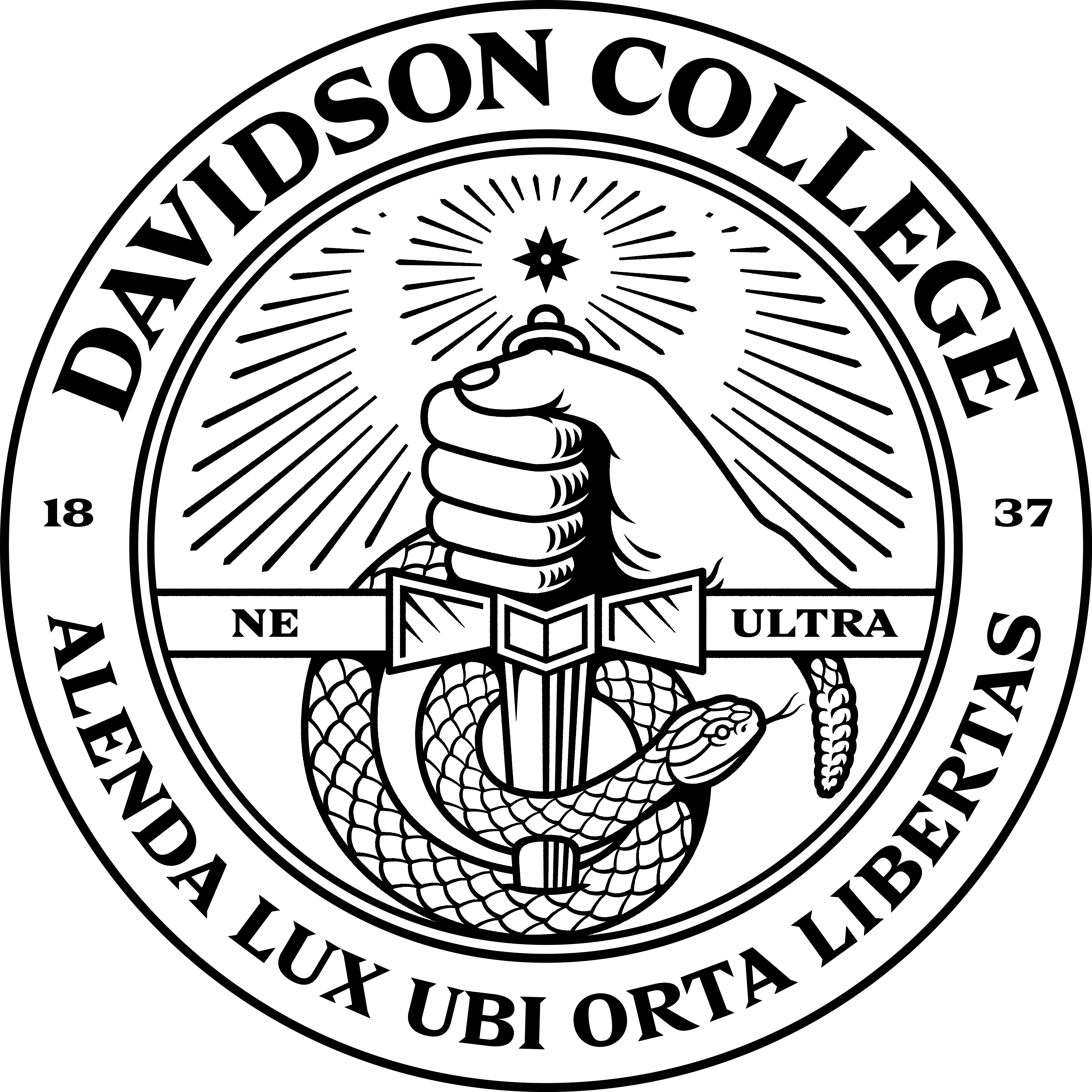
- Motto: Alenda Lux Ubi Orta Libertas (Latin)
- Motto in English: Let Learning Be Cherished Where Liberty Has Arisen
- Type: Private liberal arts college
- Established: 1837; 189 years ago
- Religious affiliation: Presbyterian Church (USA)
- Academic affiliations: APCU; NAICU; ACS; Annapolis Group; Oberlin Group; CLAC
- Endowment: $1.46 billion (2025)
- President: Douglas A. Hicks
- Faculty: 207
- Undergraduates: 2,079
- Location: Davidson, North Carolina, United States
- Campus: Suburban, 665-acre (2.69 km^{2}) main campus and a 110-acre (0.45 km^{2}) Lake Campus
- Colors: Red and black
- Nickname: Wildcats
- Sporting affiliations: NCAA Division I – A-10, Pioneer Football League
- Mascot: Roary the Wildcat
- Website: davidson.edu
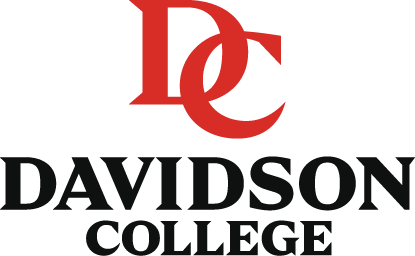

Davidson College is a private liberal arts college in Davidson, North Carolina, United States. It was established in 1837 by the Concord Presbytery and named after Revolutionary War general William Lee Davidson, who was killed at the nearby Battle of Cowan's Ford.

Davidson is a four-year undergraduate institution and enrolls 1,973 students from 50 states and territories, Washington, D.C., and 46 countries. Of those students, 95 percent live on campus, 71 percent study abroad, and about 25 percent participate in 21 NCAA Division I sports. The college's athletic teams, the Wildcats, compete in the Atlantic 10 Conference for all sports except football and wrestling, which compete in the Pioneer Football League and Southern Conference respectively. Davidson's 665-acre (269 ha) main campus is located in a suburban community 19 miles (30 km) north of downtown Charlotte, North Carolina. The college also operates a 110-acre (44.5 ha) lake campus on the shores of nearby Lake Norman.

The college offers 37 majors and 39 minors in liberal arts disciplines as well as other interdisciplinary academic programs. Academic life at Davidson is governed by an honor code that allows students to take self-scheduled, unproctored final exams. Davidson has graduated 24 Rhodes Scholars and is among the top undergraduate institutions whose graduates receive Fulbright Scholarships.

== History ==
An institution of higher learning of The Presbyterian Church (USA), Davidson College was founded in 1837 by The Concord Presbytery after purchasing 469 acres (1.90 km^{2}) of land from William Lee Davidson II, who claimed possession of at least 25 enslaved individuals in Mecklenburg County and 65 in Alabama. Davidson II owned the Beaver Dam plantation in Davidson, North Carolina where approximately 16-26 enslaved individuals lived and labored. The college owns Beaver Dam plantation to this day. Previously, Davidson leased the site to the City of Davidson for events and parties, but the college has plans to turn Beaver Dam into an educational center. William Lee Davidson II was the son of Revolutionary War commander Brigadier General William Lee Davidson, for whom the college is named. Church records show a meeting on May 13, 1835, among subsequent meetings, by members of the Concord Presbytery making plans to purchase and perform initial construction on the land, with land payments starting Jan 1 of the following year. The first students graduated from Davidson in 1840 and received diplomas with the newly created college seal designed by Peter Stuart Ney, who is believed by some to be Napoleon's Marshal Ney.

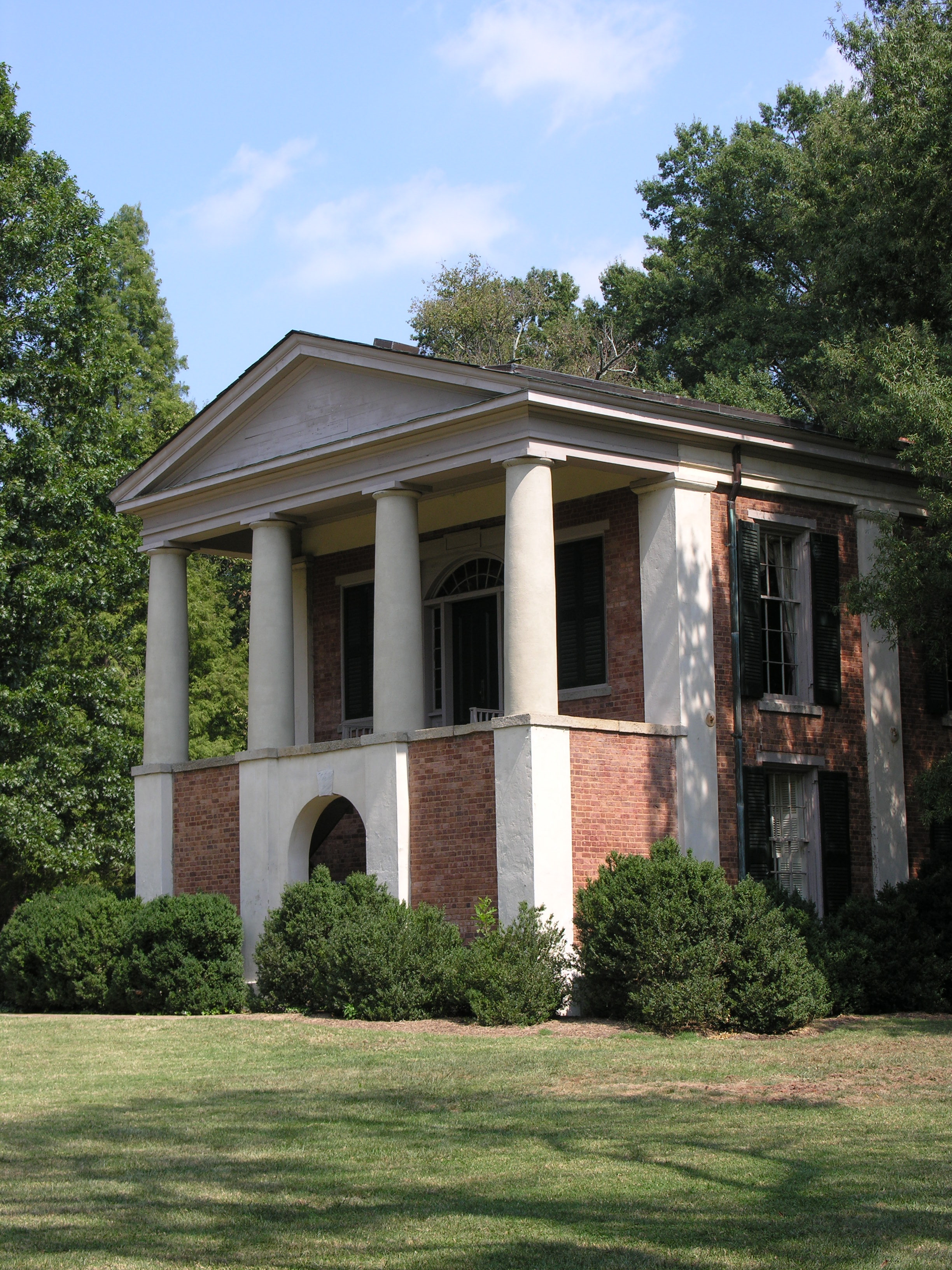
Philanthropic Hall (shown) and Eumenean Hall are on the National Register of Historic Places

In the 1850s, Davidson overcame financial difficulty by instituting "The Scholarship Plan," a program that allowed Davidson hopefuls to purchase a scholarship for $100, which could be redeemed in exchange for full tuition to Davidson until the 1870s. The college's financial situation improved dramatically in 1856 with a $250,000 donation by Maxwell Chambers, who was an enslaver and built his wealth from the slave trade. Chambers's financial contribution to Davidson kept the college afloat during the Civil War and made Davidson the wealthiest college south of Princeton. The Chambers Building was erected to commemorate this gift. On November 28, 1921, the Chambers Building was destroyed in a fire but was reconstructed eight years later with funding from the Rockefeller family. The Chambers Building continues to be the primary academic building on campus.

In 1923, the Gamma chapter in North Carolina of Phi Beta Kappa was established at Davidson. Over 1500 men and 500 women have been initiated into Davidson's chapter of Phi Beta Kappa. In 1924, James Duke formed the Duke Endowment, which has provided millions of dollars to the college. In 1954, the president of Georgia Tech Blake R. Van Leer and Davidson's president John Rood Cunningham arranged the first-of-its-kind joint engineering program.

In 1961, Davidson's Board of Trustees voted to admit Black students to the campus, two years after the Supreme Court ruled public universities must integrate. In 1962, Benoit (Ben) Nzengu '66, the son of a Presbyterian missionary from the Congo, enrolled at Davidson and became the college's first Black student. The first African American students to study at Davidson, Leslie Brown ’69 and Wayne Crumwell ’68, enrolled in 1964. Kaneisha Gaston, the first Black student with deep ties to the Town of Davidson, graduated in 2013.

On May 5, 1972, the trustees voted to allow women to enroll at Davidson as degree students for the first time. Women had attended classes as early as the 1860s but did not enjoy degree privileges. The first women to attend classes at Davidson were the five daughters of its president, the Rev. John Lycan Kirkpatrick. The first women were permitted to attend classes to increase the size of the student body during the American Civil War. However, art major Marianna "Missy" Woodward became the first woman to graduate from Davidson. She graduated in 1973 and was the only woman in a class of 217.

In 2007, Davidson eliminated the need for students to take out loans from the college to pay for their tuition. All demonstrated need is met through grants, student employment, parental contribution, and federal student loans. The college claims to be the first liberal arts college in the United States to do this.

=== Admissions ===
Princeton Review and U.S. News & World Report regard Davidson's admission process as "most selective".

For the class of 2027 (enrolled fall 2023), Davidson received 7,363 applications and accepted 1,068 (14.5%). Of those, 1,005 applied early decision and 338 were accepted. The yield rate (the percentage of accepted students who enroll) was 49.3%. The middle 50% range of SAT scores for enrolled students was 670–740 for Evidence-Based Reading & Writing, and 690–750 for Math, while the ACT Composite range was 31–33. Enrolled freshmen represent 41 states and 35 countries; 35.9% were from the American South. The college is need-blind for domestic applicants.

=== Rankings ===
Academic rankings

Liberal arts
- U.S. News & World Report: 14
- Washington Monthly: 12

National
- Forbes: 48
- WSJ/College Pulse: 10

The 2025 annual ranking by U.S. News & World Report rates Davidson College as tied for the 14th best among "National Liberal Arts Colleges" in America, tied for 4th for "Best Undergraduate Teaching" and 10th for "Best Value". Davidson College was ranked 48th overall on Forbes ' list of "America's Top Colleges," for the 2024-25 rankings. Davidson was also ranked as the 11th best liberal arts college, and 10th best in the South. In 2018, Kiplinger's Personal Finance rated Davidson College as the #1 best college for value across all colleges and universities in America. In 2024, Washington Monthly ranked Davidson College 12th among 194 liberal arts colleges in the U.S. based on its contribution to the public good, as measured by social mobility, research, and promoting public service.

According to The Princeton Review, Davidson is ranked among the top twenty colleges nationally for the following categories: "Best Overall Academic Experience For Undergraduates," "Professors Get High Marks" (1st), "Professors Make Themselves Accessible" (16th), "Students Study the Most" (10th), "School Runs Like Butter" (4th), "Town-Gown Relations are Great" (3rd), "Easiest Campus to Get Around" (3rd), and "Best Quality of Life (16th)."

=== Faculty ===
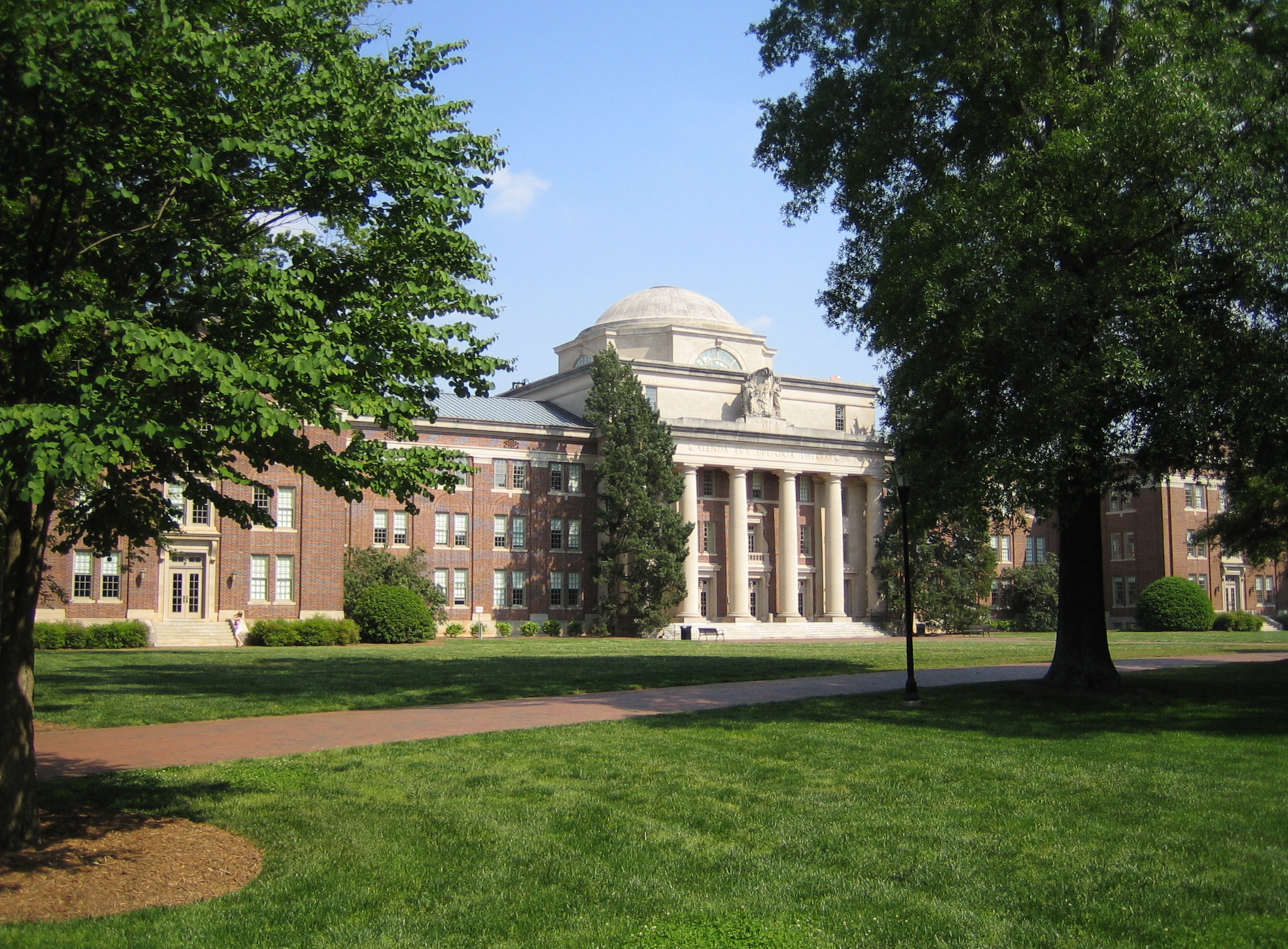
Chambers Building at Davidson College

Davidson has a student-faculty ratio of 8:1, 69% of its classes are under 20 students.

Davidson has 201 full-time faculty members. Almost all faculty members have terminal degrees in their field, with 97% of full-time members holding PhDs.

=== Honor code ===
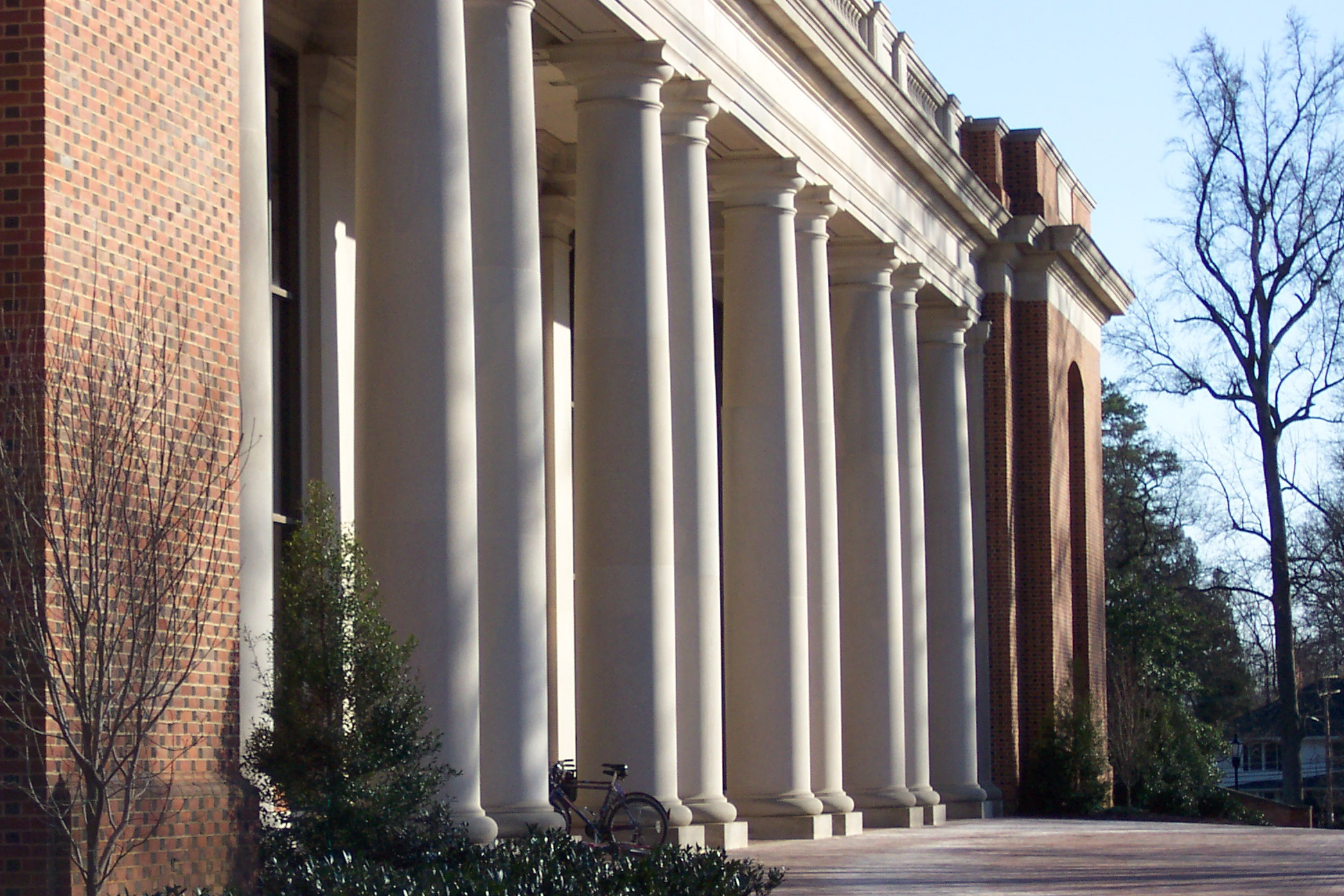
E. H. Little Library, Davidson College

Davidson students are bound by an honor code, signed by each student at the start of their first year.

As one of the most obvious manifestations of the Honor Code, Davidson students take self-scheduled, unproctored final exams.

=== Majors and minors ===
Davidson offers majors in 31 subject areas. Students can also design their own major through the Center for Interdisciplinary Studies. In addition to the one major required for graduation, students may pursue a second major, a minor, or a concentration. Its three most popular majors, by 2024 graduates, were Econometrics & Quantitative Economics (89), Biology (83), and Political Science (54).

== Campus ==
Davidson College’s campus in Davidson, North Carolina, combines nineteenth-century buildings with later academic, residential, and athletic facilities. The grounds are an accredited Level I arboretum, with collections of trees and woody plants maintained for education, conservation, and public enjoyment.

=== Historic Quad ===
The Historic Quad contains several of the college’s earliest surviving buildings, all constructed with bricks made by enslaved laborers. Construction of Elm Row and Oak Row began in 1836, and both served as dormitories when the college opened in 1837. Each originally accommodated sixteen students in four rooms. Subsequently used for classrooms, offices, and other purposes, Oak Row now houses an exhibition on the college’s institutional history. Eumenean Hall, constructed in 1849, and Philanthropic Hall, constructed in 1850, were built for Davidson’s two literary societies. The buildings face one another across the quadrangle and remain associated with the societies’ activities.

The quad also contains With These Hands, a memorial by Hank Willis Thomas honoring the enslaved and exploited people whose labor contributed to the college’s establishment and development. All college presidents from 1837 to 1860 owned enslaved people, as did many faculty members and students. Those who did not enslave people often paid enslavers on nearby plantations for their services.

=== Academic Buildings ===
Chambers Building occupies the center of campus and serves as Davidson’s principal academic building. Its predecessor, known as Old Chambers, was designed by Alexander Jackson Davis and completed in 1860. Combining classrooms, student accommodations, laboratories, a library, and a chapel, the building was regarded as one of the South’s finest academic structures. College librarian and historian Cornelia Shaw described it as “the most imposing and perhaps the largest college structure in the State.” Old Chambers was destroyed by fire in 1921. Its replacement, completed in 1929 and dedicated in 1930, houses classrooms, faculty and administrative offices, Hance Auditorium, and the Lilly Family Gallery.

Nearby, the E. Craig Wall Jr. Academic Center contains teaching and research laboratories, faculty offices, and shared spaces for study and collaboration.

=== Library ===
The college’s library facilities are undergoing redevelopment. Opened in 1974, E. H. Little Library is being renovated and expanded to become the George Lawrence Abernethy Library, scheduled to open in fall 2027. The project includes spaces for library collections, collaborative learning, research, and exhibitions.

=== Student Life and the Arts ===
The Knobloch Campus Center was created through the renovation of Johnston Gymnasium in 2000–2001. It houses the Alvarez College Union and Duke Family Performance Hall. The Katherine and Tom Belk Visual Arts Center, Sloan Music Center, and Cunningham Theatre Center are facilities for arts instruction, exhibitions, and performances.

=== Residential Buildings ===
Residential buildings represent several periods of campus development, including Sentelle Hall, built in 1922, Watts Hall, built in 1924, and later suite-style accommodations such as Tomlinson Hall, completed in 2000.

=== Athletic Facilities and Lake Campus ===
Recent athletic construction includes Davidson College Stadium and Game Changers Field House, which opened in 2024.

Separate from the main campus, Davidson maintains a 110-acre Lake Campus on Lake Norman, approximately seven miles away. Its facilities include a swimming beach, boat slips, a boat ramp, picnic areas, and spaces used by the college’s sailing and crew teams.

== Student life ==
=== Athletics ===
Davidson competes at the NCAA Division I level in 19 sports. Of these sports, 10 are men's and 9 are women's. Approximately 24% of the Davidson on-campus student body participates in varsity sports. Davidson has the fourth-smallest undergraduate enrollment of any school in Division I football, behind Presbyterian, VMI (Virginia Military Institute), and Wofford (smallest to largest).

Davidson's sports teams are known as the Wildcats. Their colors are red and black, although since 2008, many sports including football, men's basketball, and men's soccer have moved towards a brighter hue of red and white. The Wildcats participate as a member of the Atlantic 10 Conference in all sports other than football and wrestling. Sports that compete in other conferences include football in Division I Football Championship Subdivision Pioneer Football League, and wrestling in the Southern Conference.

=== Student organizations ===
There are two main student publications on campus. The first is Quips & Cranks, the college yearbook, and the second is the campus weekly, the Davidsonian.

Quips and Cranks was first published in 1885 (covering the 1884–1885 academic year) by the Eumenean and Philanthropic Literary Societies to preserve the memories and traditions of Davidson for students and alumni alike. The Davidson annual was named “Quips and Cranks” after the following verse from Milton’s L’Allegro: “Haste thee nymph, and bring with thee / Jest and youthful jollity, / Quips and Cranks, and wanton wiles, / Nods and becks, and wreathed smiles.” Following the COVID-19 pandemic, the yearbook ceased publication, but in 2025 the book was officially revived and is set to cover the 24/25 school year as well as the preceding lost half decade. Davidson College ensures that each student on campus receives a free copy of the book to make the memories of the year accessible to all, reflecting Davidson’s commitment to student voice, equity, and campus-wide participation in storytelling and history.

The Davidsonian was founded in 1914 and has published a volume every year since then. Digital archives of the newspaper and yearbook are available online.

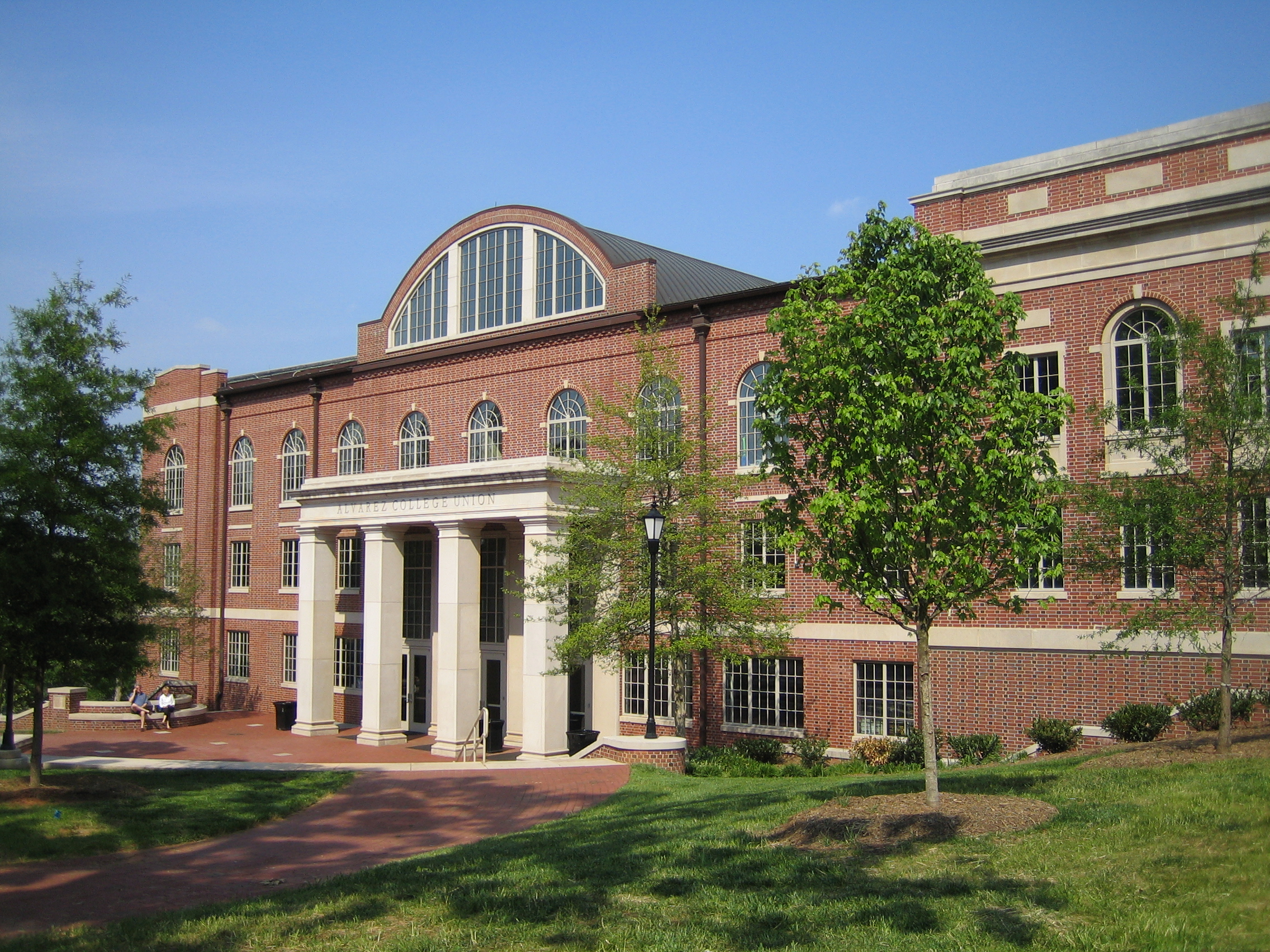
Alvarez College Union, Davidson College

Davidson offers over 150 student organizations on campus.

=== Greek life and eating houses ===
The fraternity and eating house system at Davidson is known as Patterson Court. Approximately 80% of the female students and 40% of male students belong to a fraternity or an eating house.

=== College Farm ===
The Farm at Davidson College supplies local, organic produce to students through the college's Dining Services operation. The farm covers three acres and is a stand-alone, business-based unit of the college.

== Royal Shakespeare Company residencies ==
In 2002, the Royal Shakespeare Company performed William Shakespeare's The Merchant of Venice in residency at Davidson College, the RSC's second residency at a US college or university. The performance inaugurated the Duke Family Performance Hall. In March 2005, the RSC returned to Davidson and was in residency for most of the month, performing The Two Gentlemen of Verona and Julius Caesar by William Shakespeare, as well as numerous educational activities, many of which were open to the general public. In February 2006, their artists directed scenes from Shakespeare's plays and other theatrical materials inspired by Shakespeare, entitled For Every Passion, Something, with Davidson students as actors. The productions Infinite Variety and For Every Passion Something were presented at the Edinburgh Festival Fringe in Edinburgh, Scotland. In February 2007, the Royal Shakespeare Company performed Shakespeare's Pericles and The Winter's Tale, as well as Roy Williams's Days of Significance, in the Duke Family Performance Hall. In 2008, the RSC conducted educational programs, similar to those they presented in 2006. Also during this residency, playwright Rona Munro developed a new play, Little Eagles.

== Financial aid ==
In 2007, Davidson College announced that all students would have their demonstrated financial need met by grants and student employment; loans would no longer be a component of any Davidson financial aid package. The Duke Endowment pledged $15,000,000 to support the initiative and it was named The Davidson Trust.

In addition to not including loans in their financial aid packages, Davidson's 2014 capital campaign adding 156 new scholarships funded with $88 million. Davidson states that they are committed to providing 100% of demonstrated need of all students, which is calculated by the federal FAFSA program, with 44% of students receiving need-based aid and over 50% receiving some form of financial aid.

== Notable alumni ==
Davidson alumni include:

- Bishop of the Episcopal Diocese of California, Austin K. Rios
- Congressman Greg Murphy
- North Carolina Governor James G. Martin
- North Carolina Governor James Holshouser
- Representative Beth Gardner Helfrich
- US Secretary of State Dean Rusk
- White House Press Secretary Tony Snow
- US Secretary of Transportation Anthony Foxx
- Deputy White House Counsel in the Bill Clinton administration, Vincent Foster
- North Carolina Agricultural Commissioner and Farmer's Alliance leader Leonidas L. Polk
- Mystery writer Patricia Cornwell
- Pulitzer Prize-winning poet Charles Wright
- The 28th President of the United States, Woodrow Wilson, attended Davidson for one year before transferring to Princeton University
- Novelist and essayist William Styron
- NBA Champion and MVP Stephen Curry
- German politician Kurt Biedenkopf (for an exchange year)
- Japanese diplomat Koji Tomita (for an exchange year).
- Writer and scholar Clint Smith

== See also ==
- Davidson College Arboretum
