= Davidson College Arboretum =

Arboretum in Davidson, North Carolina, United States

Coordinates: 35.5002°N 80.8462°W

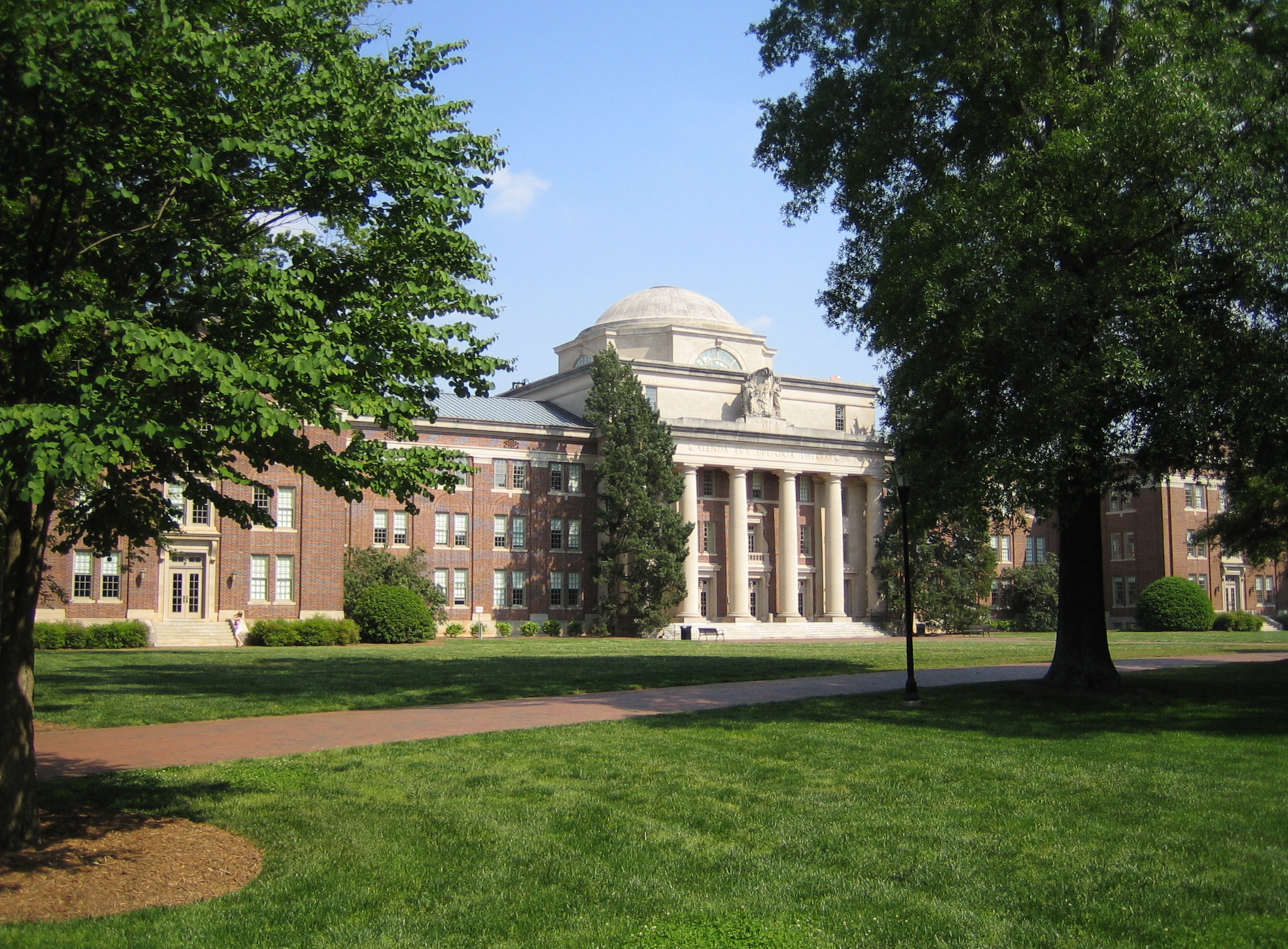
- The grounds of the entire campus is designated as a Level 1 arboretum.
- Interactive map of Davidson College Arboretum
- Type: Arboretum
- Area: 600 acres (240 ha)
- Website: Official website

Davidson College Arboretum is located on Davidson College's 600-acre campus in Davidson, North Carolina. The campus was designated a national arboretum in 1986, but the origins of the arboretum stretch to 1855, when “a few ladies of Davidson College” proposed landscape remodeling to the board of trustees. Students organized tree plantings in 1861; then in 1869, the faculty sent a proposal to the Board of Trustees recommending that the campus "represent in time the forest growth of the State, and if possible, the general botany of the region."

Over the next century, grounds supervisors and landscape architects populated the college's campus with exotic and indigenous flora of North Carolina's Piedmont region.

In 1982, President Emeritus Samuel R. Spencer Jr. received a letter from the director of the National Arboretum in Washington, D.C., Henry Cathey, urging him to use the grounds as a working arboretum. The letter was accompanied by a check from the estate of Edwin Latimer Douglass, one of whose life interests had been forestry.

The college applied funding from the Douglass estate to take aerial photos and draw up topographical maps. In 1986, the college became a full-fledged arboretum. Since then, students and college staff have contributed to the continuing project of labeling and caring for the trees on campus. Some 3,000 woody trees and shrubs have been labeled. The arboretum is open to the public.

== See also ==
- List of botanical gardens in the United States
