= New Hanover County Extension Service Arboretum =

Arboretum in Wilmington, North Carolina, United States

Coordinates: 34.2104°N 77.8353°W

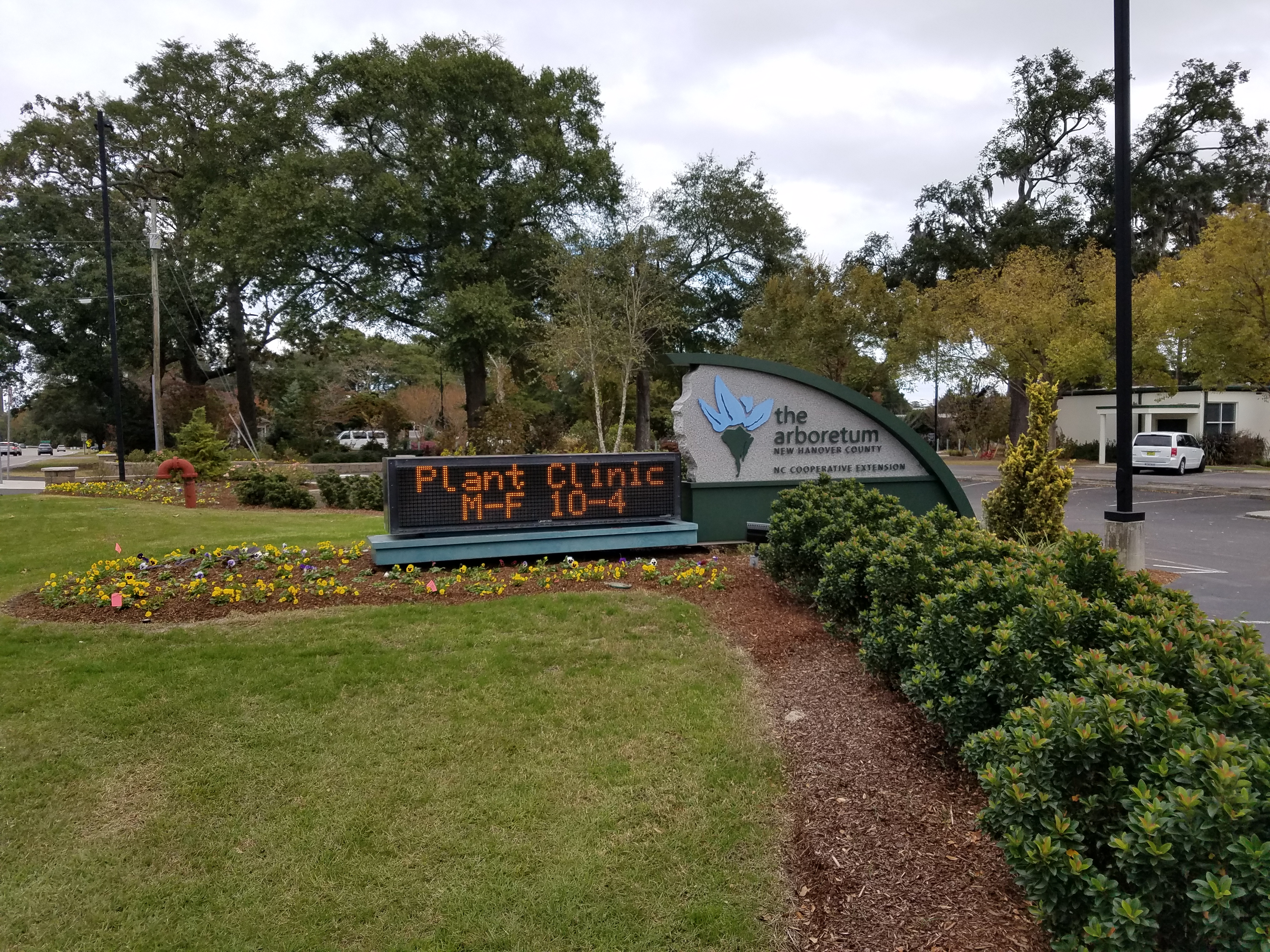
- Entrance sign
- Interactive map of New Hanover County Extension Service Arboretum
- Type: Arboretum

New Hanover County Arboretum - NC Cooperative Extension is a 7-acre arboretum at 6206 Oleander Drive, Wilmington, North Carolina. It is open daily without charge.

The arboretum was formally opened in 1989, and is still under development. It currently contains 33 gardens including an aquatic garden, children's garden, herb garden, Japanese garden, and rose garden. It is said to contain more than 4,000 varieties of native and naturalized plants, with many of its original plants given by J. C. Raulston, North Carolina State University horticulturist and namesake for the JC Raulston Arboretum.

== Gallery ==
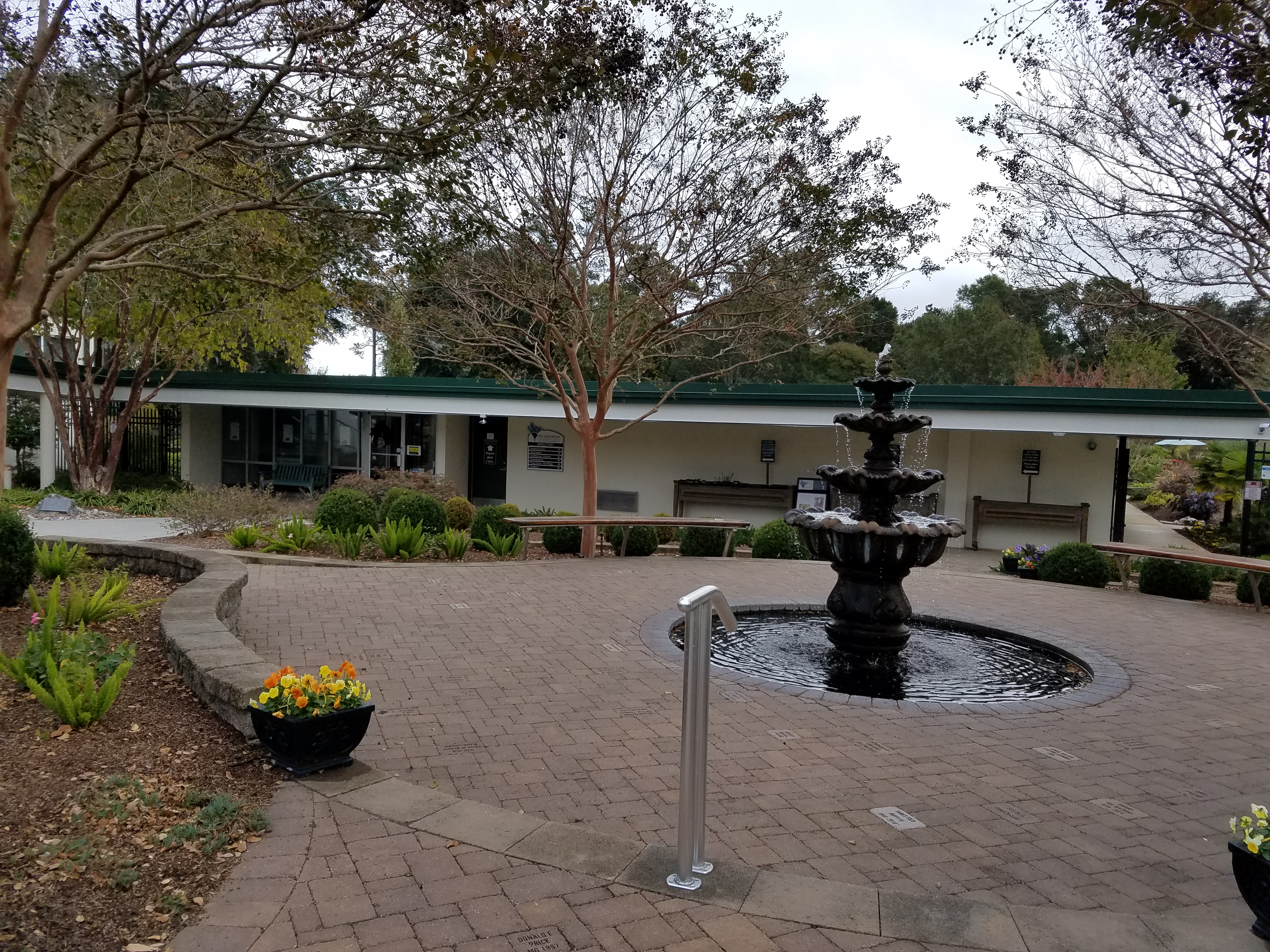

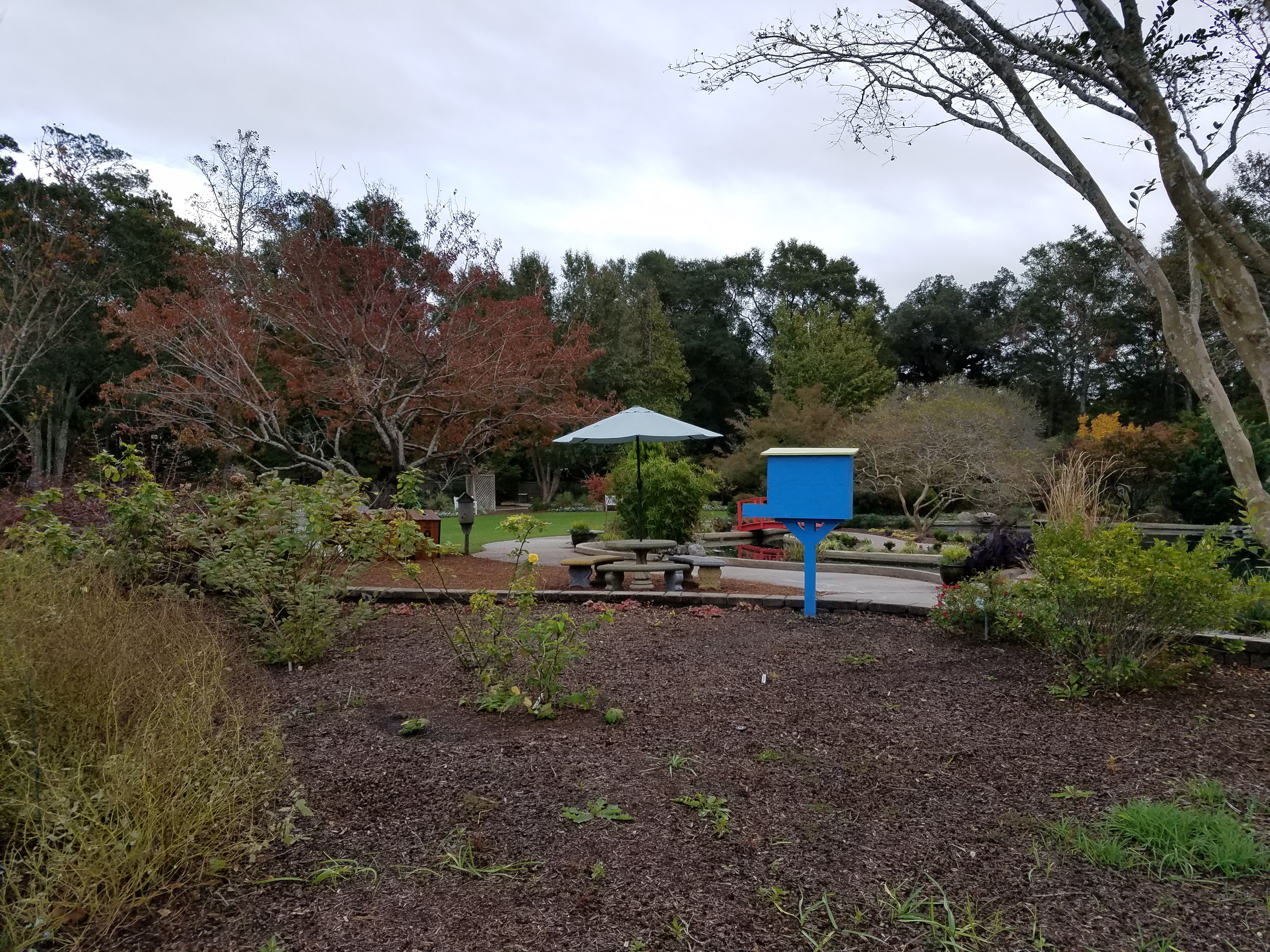

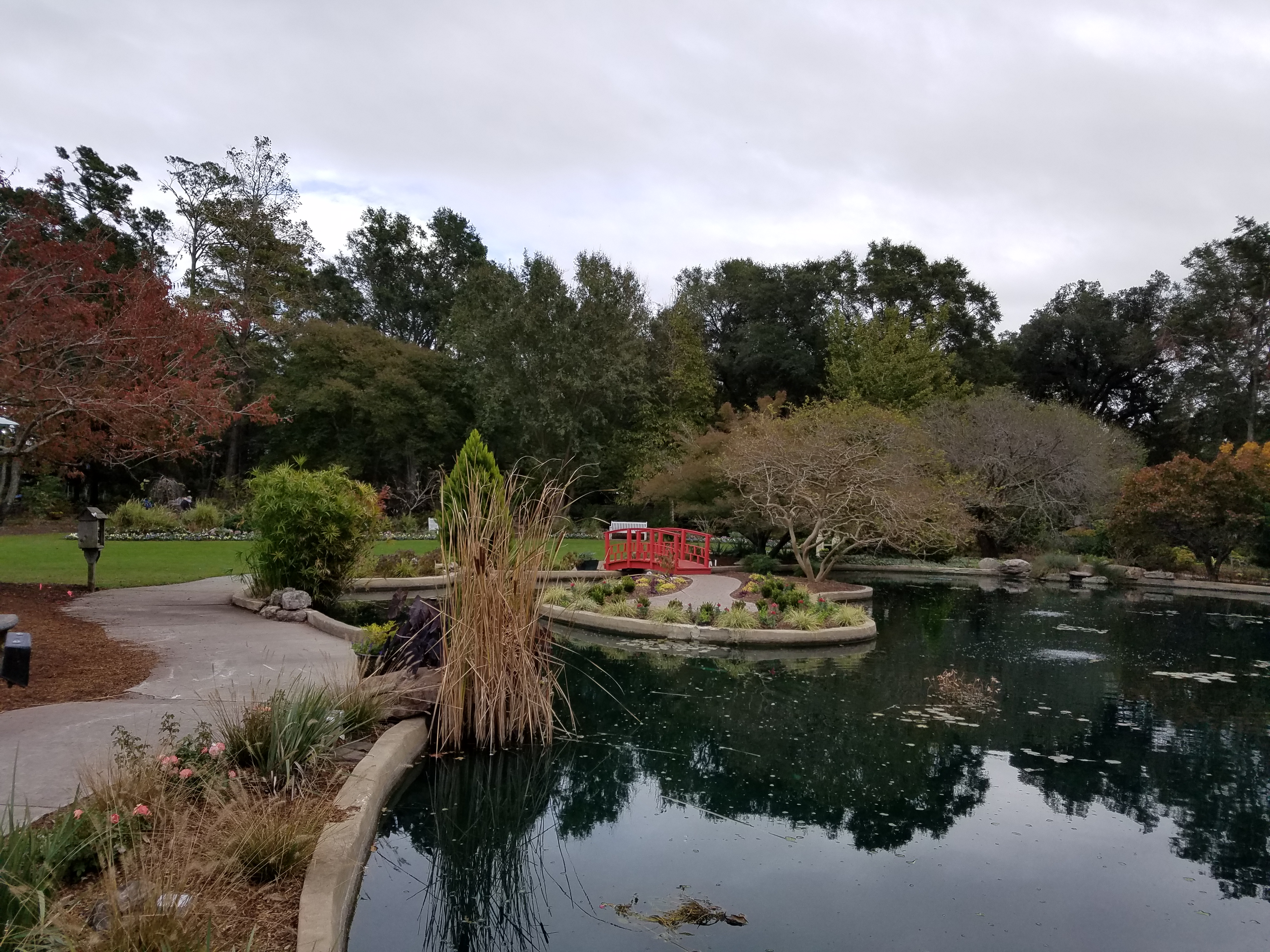

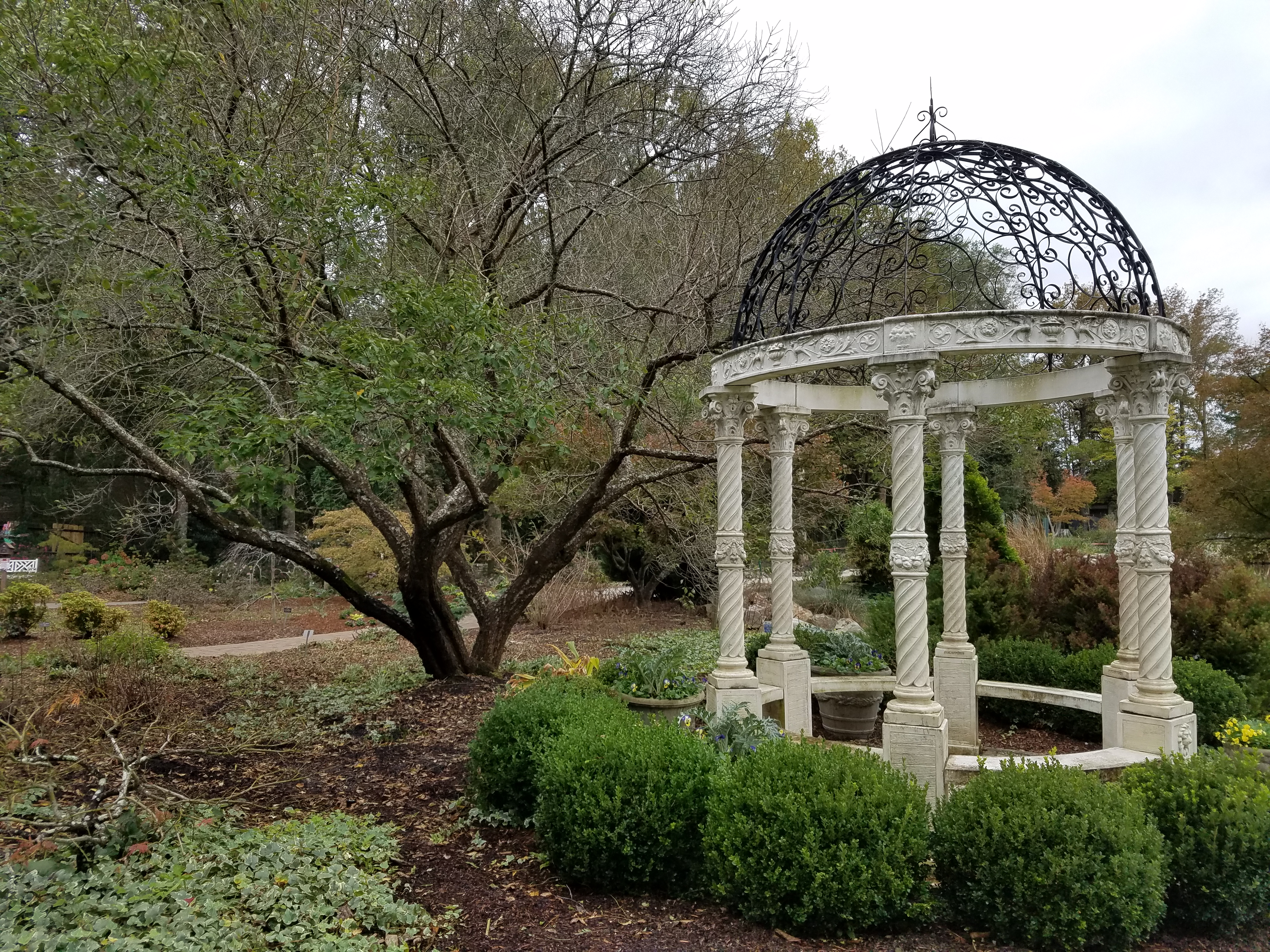

== See also ==
- List of botanical gardens in the United States
