= Sandhills Horticultural Gardens =

Gardens and natural areas in Pinehurst, North Carolina

Coordinates: 35.2235°N 79.4048°W

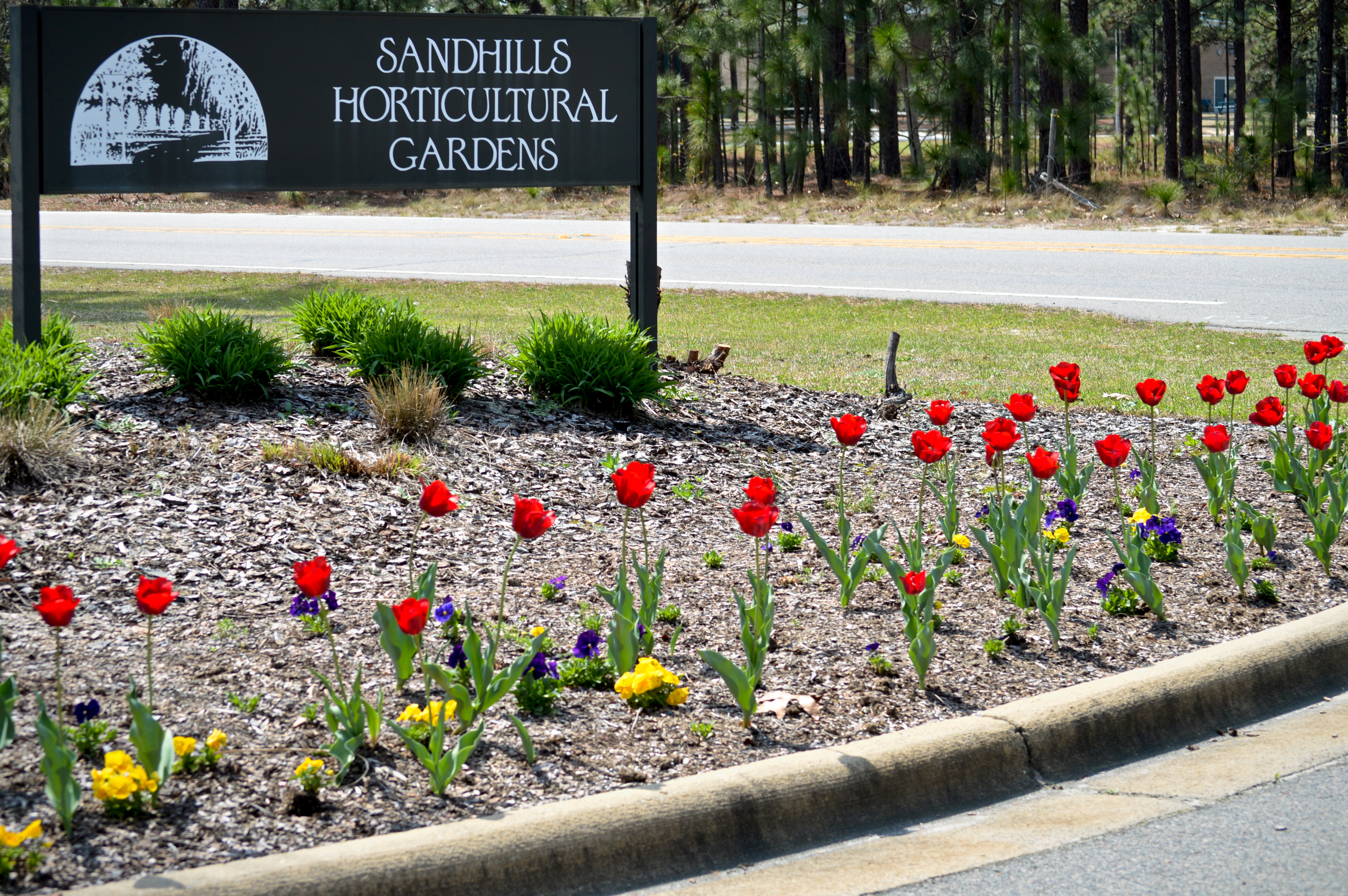
- Entrance to the gardens.
- Interactive map of Sandhills Horticultural Gardens

Sandhills Horticultural Gardens (27 acres) are gardens and natural areas located on the campus of Sandhills Community College, 3395 Airport Road, Pinehurst, North Carolina, in the United States. The gardens are open to the public daily without charge.

The gardens include a formal garden in the English style, collections of conifers and holly, a native wetland trail, a fruit and vegetable garden, roses, azaleas, rhododendrons, and a xeriscape devoted to cacti, yuccas, and other succulents.

== See also ==
- List of botanical gardens in the United States
