= University of North Carolina at Wilmington Arboretum =

Arboretum being developed in Wilmington, North Carolina

Coordinates: 34°13′35.76″N 77°52′40.97″W

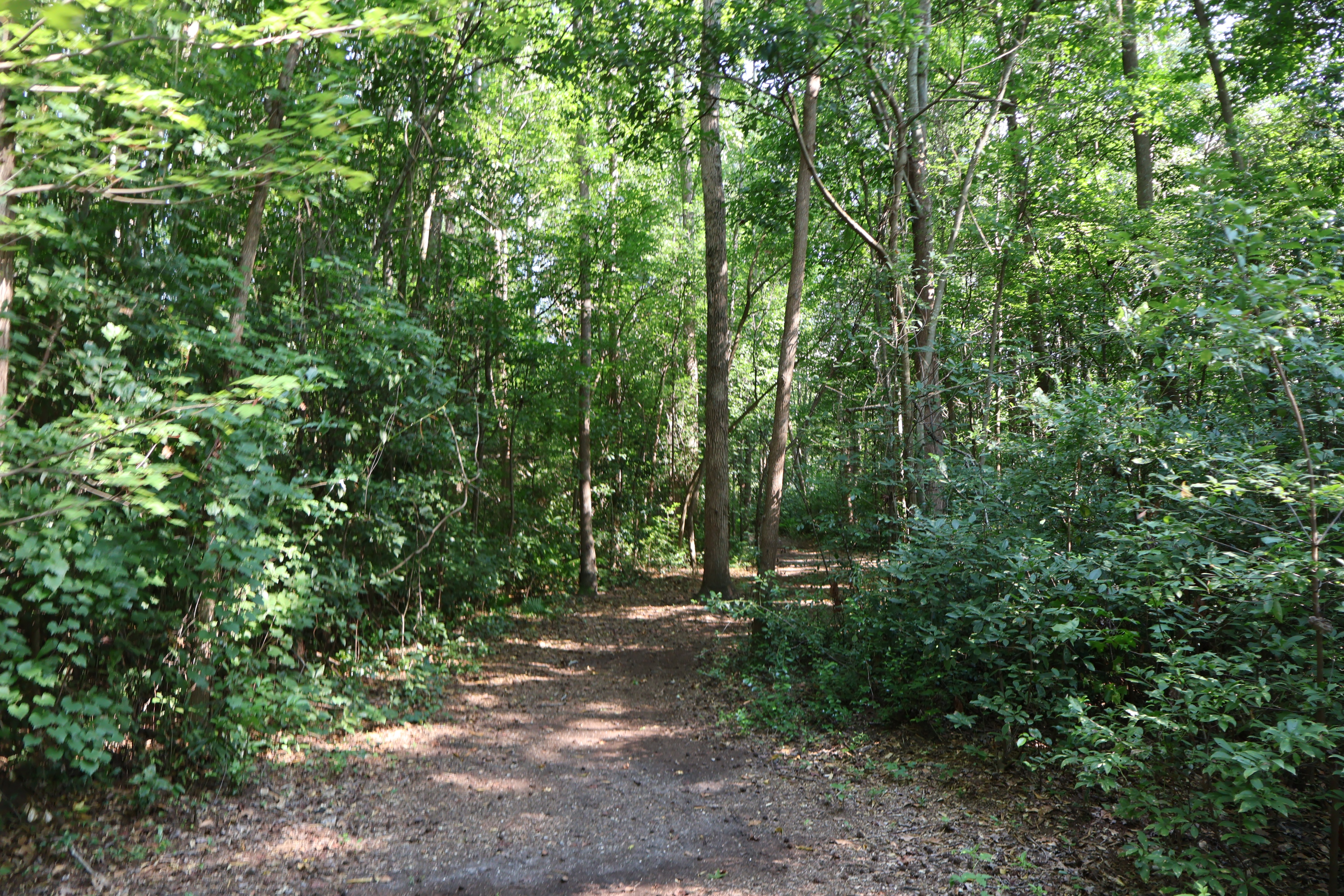
- Interactive map of University of North Carolina at Wilmington Arboretum

The University of North Carolina at Wilmington Arboretum, also known as the UNCW Arboretum, is an arboretum being developed on the University of North Carolina at Wilmington campus in Wilmington, North Carolina.

The arboretum was established in 1991, with a master plan drawn up in 1997.

== See also ==
- List of botanical gardens in the United States
