= Daniel Boone Native Gardens =

Gardens located in Boone, North Carolina, United States

Coordinates: 36.2087°N 81.6708°W

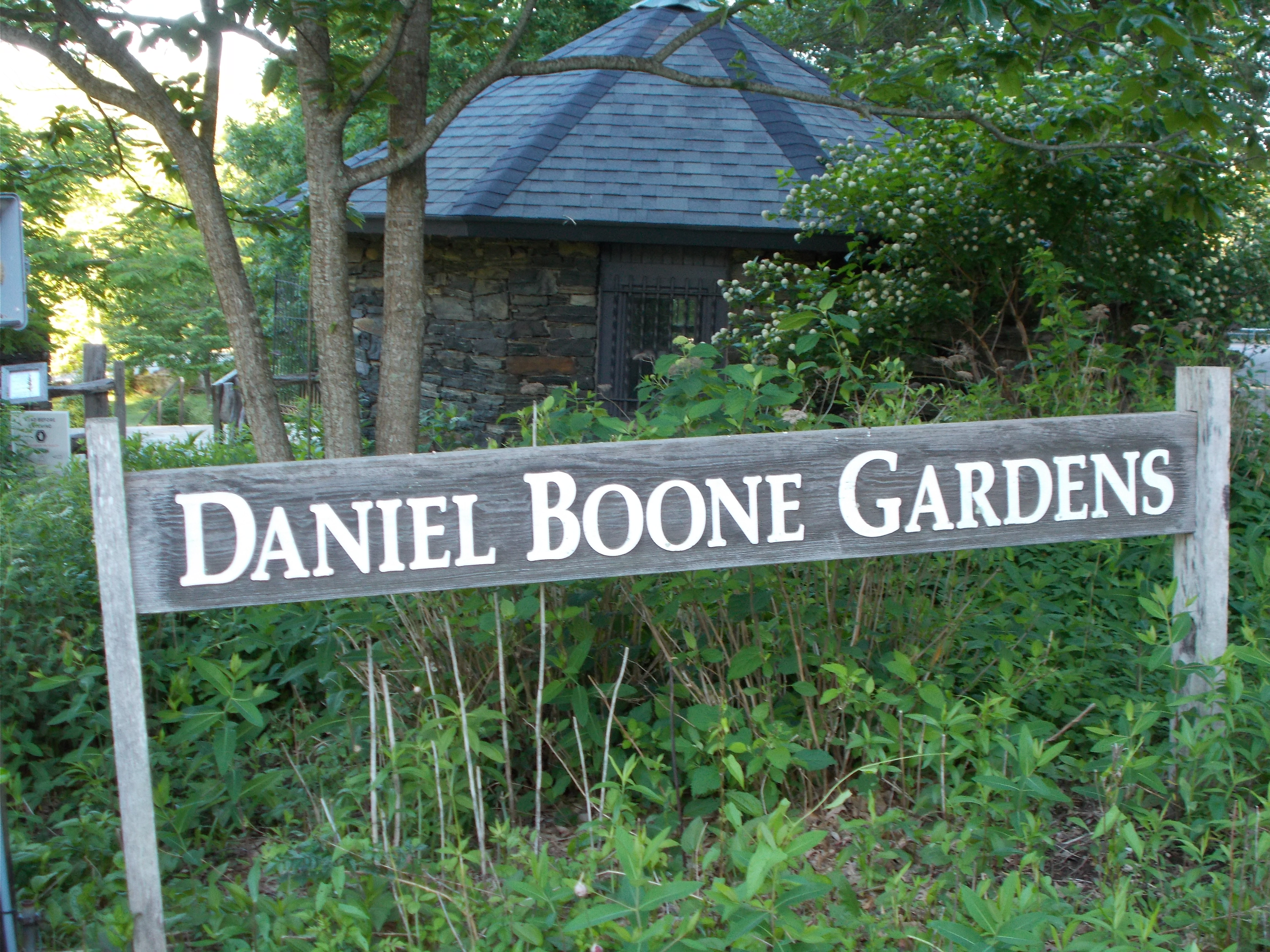
- Interactive map of Daniel Boone Native Gardens
- Type: Native gardens
- Website: www.danielboonenativegardens.org

Daniel Boone Native Gardens, located in Boone, North Carolina, United States, has a collection of North Carolina native plants in an informal landscaped design. The gardens are open daily from May to October.

== History ==
The gardens were planned as a laboratory so that clubs, schools and botanists could study plants within a small area. The Garden Club of North Carolina broke ground in May 1961 on land adjacent to the outdoor theater where Horn in the West is performed. The Asheville landscape architect Doan Ogden designed the layout of the gardens. The gardens officially opened to the public in 1966.

== Features ==
The wrought iron gates at the entrance were given by Daniel Boone VI, a descendant of famed American frontiersman Daniel Boone. Its main features include a bog garden, stone gatehouse, rockery, grassed allée, wishing well, reflection pool, prayer shrine, rustic bridge and Squire Boone Cabin. Squire Boone Cabin is typical of the cabin in which Daniel Boone lived. The logs are from the cabin of Jesse Boone, Daniel's brother, where Daniel spent much time. The newest addition to the garden, the bog, was dedicated in June 1992.

== Plants on display ==
=== Large trees ===
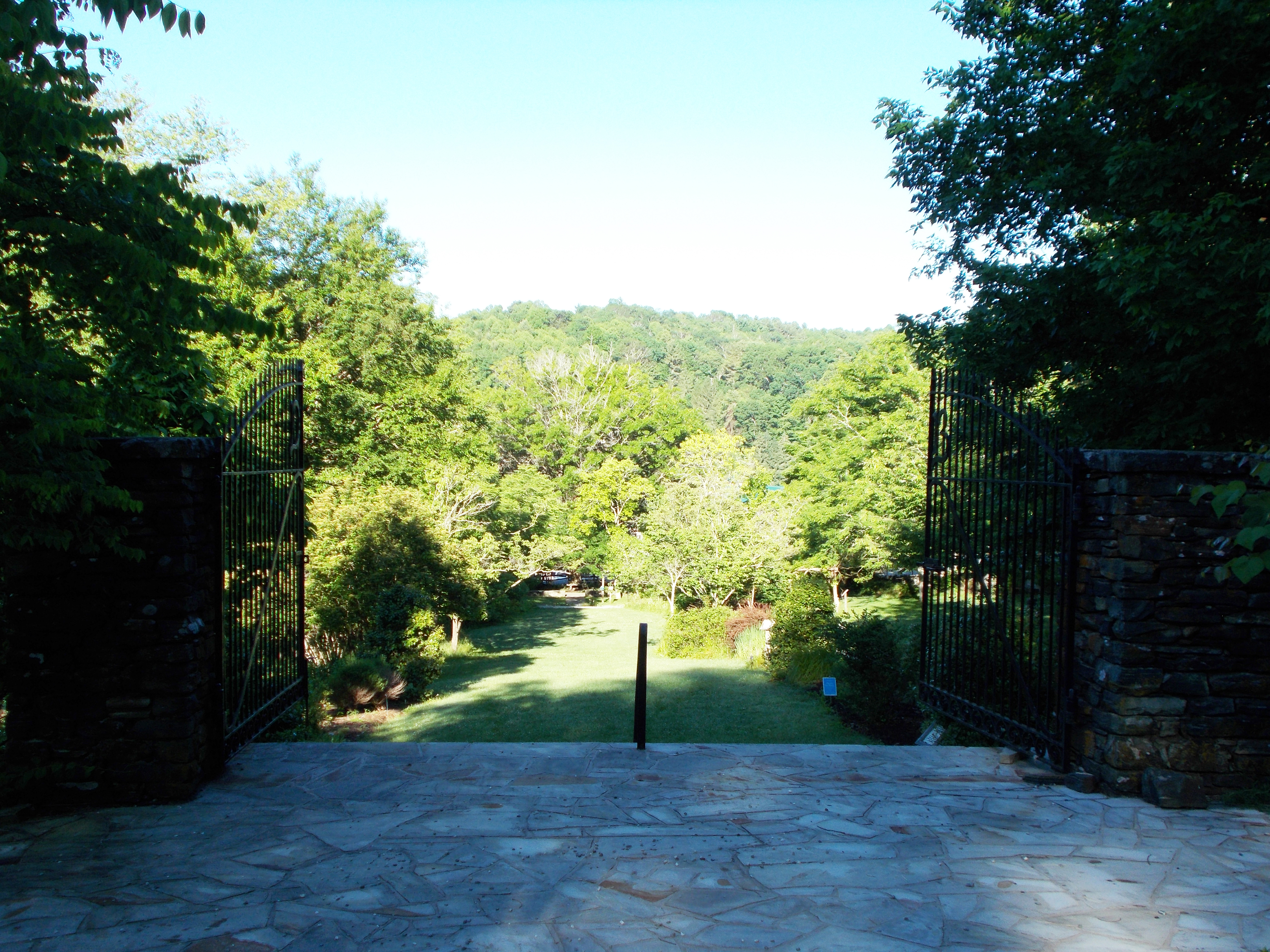
View

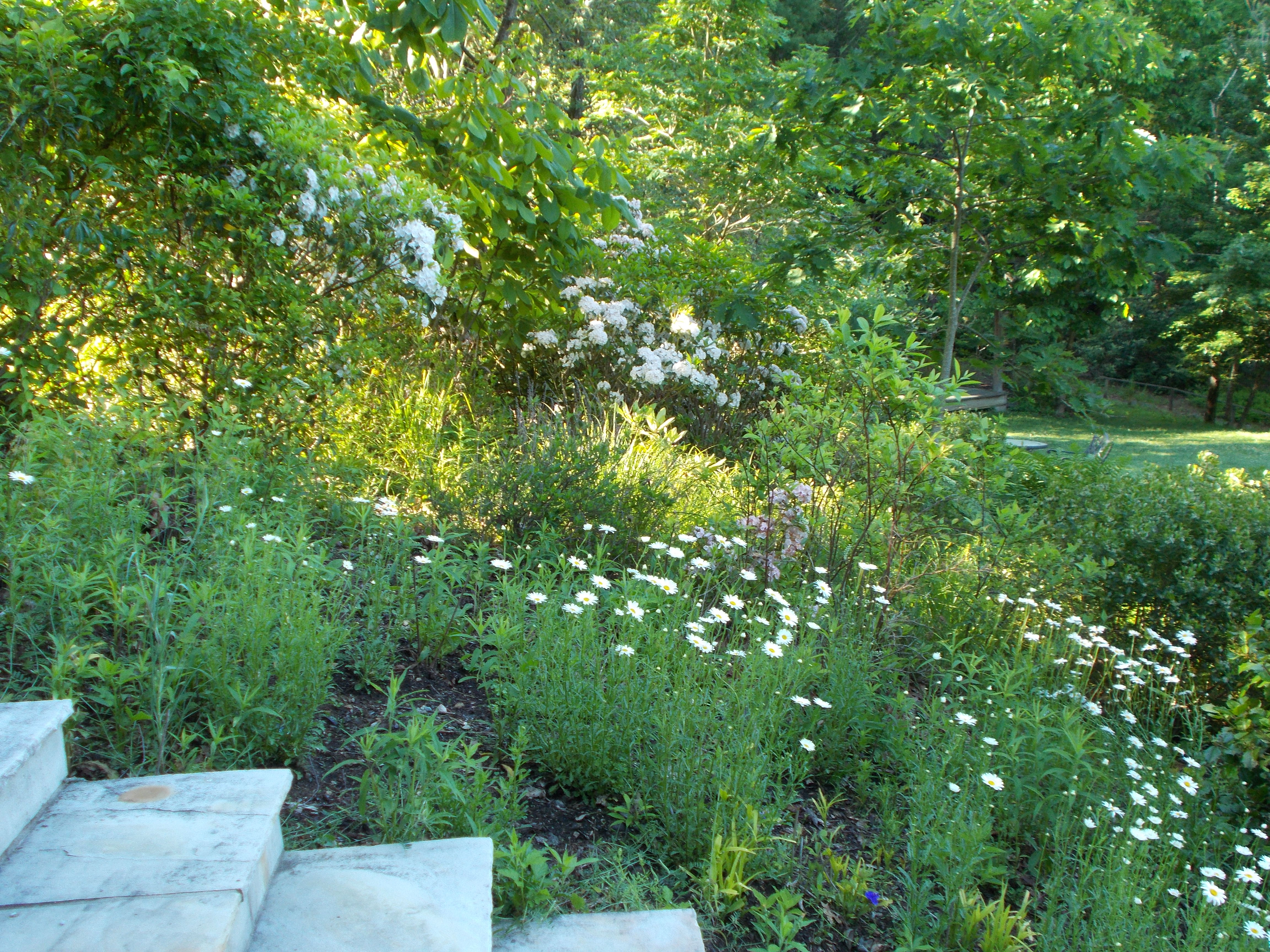
Native plants

- Acer spicatum (mountain maple)
- Acer saccharum (sugar maple)
- Acer rubrum (red maple)
- Acer pensylvanicum (striped maple)
- Fagus grandifolia (beech)
- Sassafras
- Sycamore
- Fraxinus pennsylvanica (green ash)
- Persimmon
- Magnolia acuminata
- Magnolia fraseri
- Magnolia tripetala
- Magnolia macrophylla
- Mulberry
- Liriodendron tulipifera (yellow poplar)
- Golden weeping willow
- Juglans cinerea (butternut)
- Hickory
- Slippery elm
- Nyssa sylvatica (black gum)
- Black walnut
- White paper birch
- Betula nigra (river birch)
- Betula lutea (yellow birch)
- Betula lenta (cherry birch)
- Dogwood
- Redbud
- Chionanthus (fringe tree)
- Sweet crab
- Sourwoods
- Pussy willow
- Amelanchier (shadblow)
- Sorbus aucuparia (mountain ash, rowan)
- Franklinia
- Halesia carolina (silver bell)

=== Conifers ===
- Thuja occidentalis
- Juniperus virginiana
- Carolina hemlocks
- Canadian hemlocks
- Red spruce
- Fraser fir
- Balsam fir
- white pine
- Shortleaf pine
- Scrub pine

=== Shrubs ===
- Rhododendron maximum
- Rhododendron catawbiense
- Rhododendron carolinianum
- Rhododendron minus
- Kalmia latifolia (mountain laurel)
- Pieris floribunda
- Leucothoe catesbeii
- Azalea Rosea
- Azalea Vaseyi
- Azalea Viscosa
- Azalea Arborescens
- Azalea Calendulacea (flame)

=== Flowers and vines ===
- 12 types of native vines
- Shade, evergreen, rock garden and bog wildflowers
- Ferns and mosses

== See also ==
- Daniel Boone Arboretum (Harrogate, Tennessee)
- List of botanical gardens in the United States
