= William Lanier Hunt Arboretum =

Arboretum in Chapel Hill, North Carolina

Coordinates: 35.8998°N 79.0325°W

- Interactive map of William Lanier Hunt Arboretum

The William Lanier Hunt Arboretum (over 100 acres) is an arboretum and natural area that forms part of the North Carolina Botanical Garden. It is operated by the University of North Carolina at Chapel Hill, Old Mason Farm Road, Chapel Hill, North Carolina. The arboretum is private and not open to the public.

Arboretum property was donated by William Lanier Hunt between the 1960s and the 1990s in order to protect natural areas and conserve woody plants of the southeastern United States. It includes several rhododendron bluffs in a gorge along Morgan Creek.

== See also ==
- List of botanical gardens in the United States
