= Botanical Gardens at Asheville =

Botanical garden in Asheville, North Carolina

Coordinates: 35.613°N 82.567°W

Asheville Botanical Garden
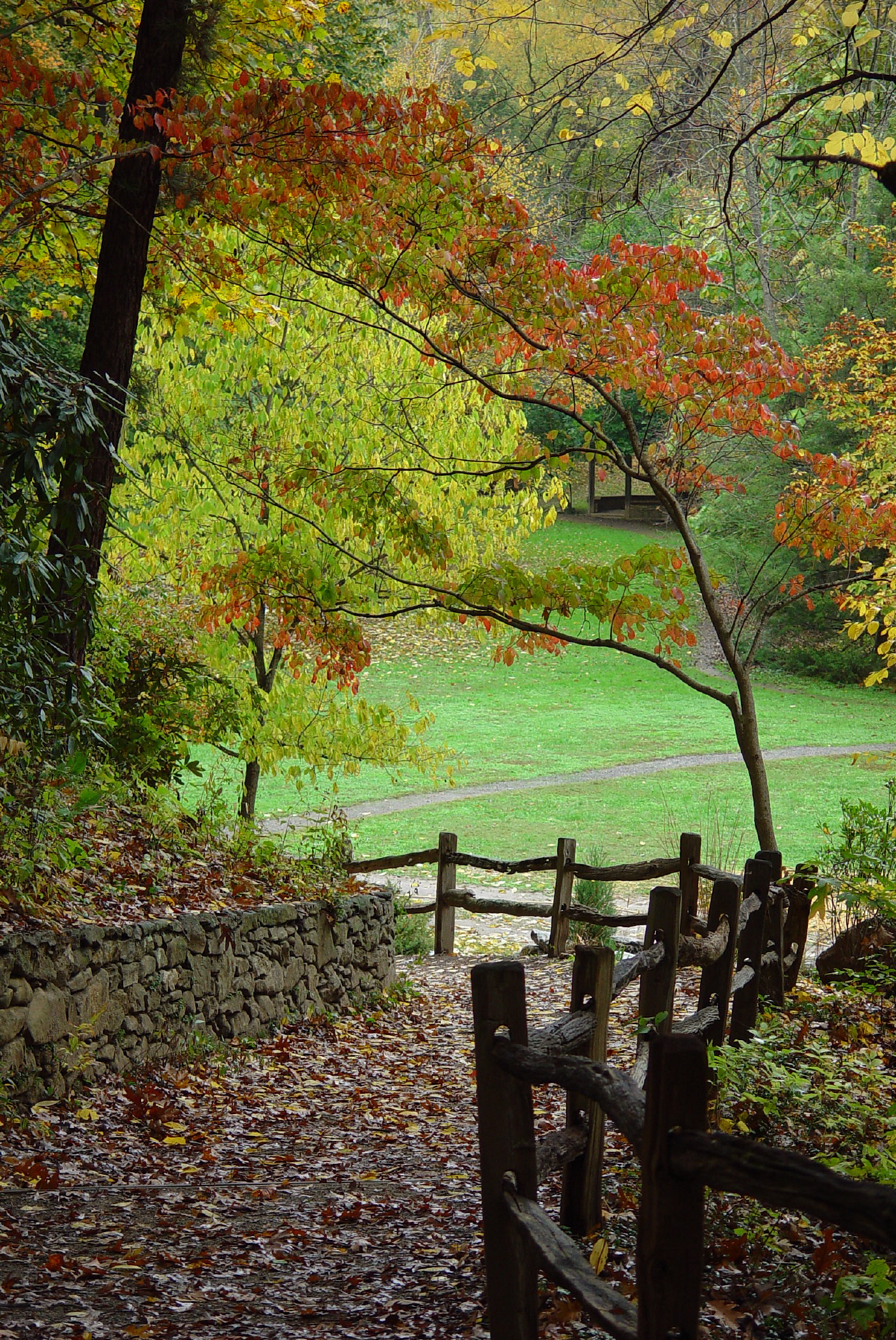
- Crayton Trail at the gardens.
- Interactive map of Asheville Botanical Garden
- Website: ashevillebotanicalgarden.org

Asheville Botanical Garden, formerly known as the Botanical Gardens at Asheville, is an independent non-profit botanical garden located on 10 acres at 151 W. T. Weaver Boulevard in Asheville, North Carolina. Dedicated to the study and promotion of the native plants and habitats of the Southern Appalachians, the garden is open daily with free admission for all. Funds to operate and maintain the garden come from membership and donations. Volunteers collaborate with a small paid staff, making this the "people's garden."

The ABG was established by community leaders in 1961 on eroded, abandoned timberland. Cleanup and initial trail-building took place from 1962 to 1963, and planting started in 1964 following an overall design by Doan Ogden, a nationally known landscape architect. At that time more than 5,000 plants were transplanted into the garden from private lands (often rescue sites, which were about to be bulldozed) and national forests. Although the ABG is located on land belonging to the adjacent University of North Carolina at Asheville, the ABG operates independently and is overseen by a board of directors elected from and by the general membership of the Botanical Garden.

Today the Garden includes more than 750 species of plants native to the southern Appalachian Mountains. It offers educational classes on botany, gardening, and related topics, held in the Visitor Center, which also features a gift shop.

== See also ==
- List of botanical gardens in the United States
