= Elizabeth Lawrence (writer) =

American writer and landscape architect

- Born: May 27, 1904; Marietta, Georgia, U.S.
- Died: June 11, 1985 (aged 81); Edgewater, Maryland, U.S.
- Occupations: Writer, landscape architect
- Writing career
- Notable work: A Southern Garden: A Handbook for the Middle South

Elizabeth Lawrence (May 5, 1904 – June 11, 1985), was an American horticulture writer and landscape architect. In 1932, she became the first woman to graduate with a degree in Landscape Architecture from (present-day) North Carolina State University. She is best known for her columns and books on Southern gardening. Lawrence wrote for House & Garden, The American Home, and Southern Home and Garden, and more than 700 columns for The Charlotte Observer.

Her home in Charlotte, North Carolina, the Elizabeth Lawrence House and Garden is recognized by the National Register of Historic Places and is part of the Wing Haven Gardens and Bird Sanctuary.

== Bibliography ==
=== Books ===
- A Southern Garden: A Handbook for the Middle South (1942)
- A Rock Garden in the South (1956)
- The Little Bulbs: A Tale of Two Gardens (1957)
- Gardens in Winter (1971)
- Lob's Wood (1971)

=== Posthumous publications ===
- Gardening for Love: The Market Bulletins (1987)
- A Garden of One's Own (1997)
- Two Gardeners: A Friendship in Letters (2002)

=== Collections ===
- Through the Garden Gate (1990), a collection of her weekly gardening column for The Charlotte Observer (1957-1971)
- Beautiful at All Seasons: Southern Gardening and Beyond (2007)
