= Elizabeth Lawrence House and Garden =

Historic house in North Carolina, United States

- Elizabeth Lawrence House & Garden
- U.S. National Register of Historic Places
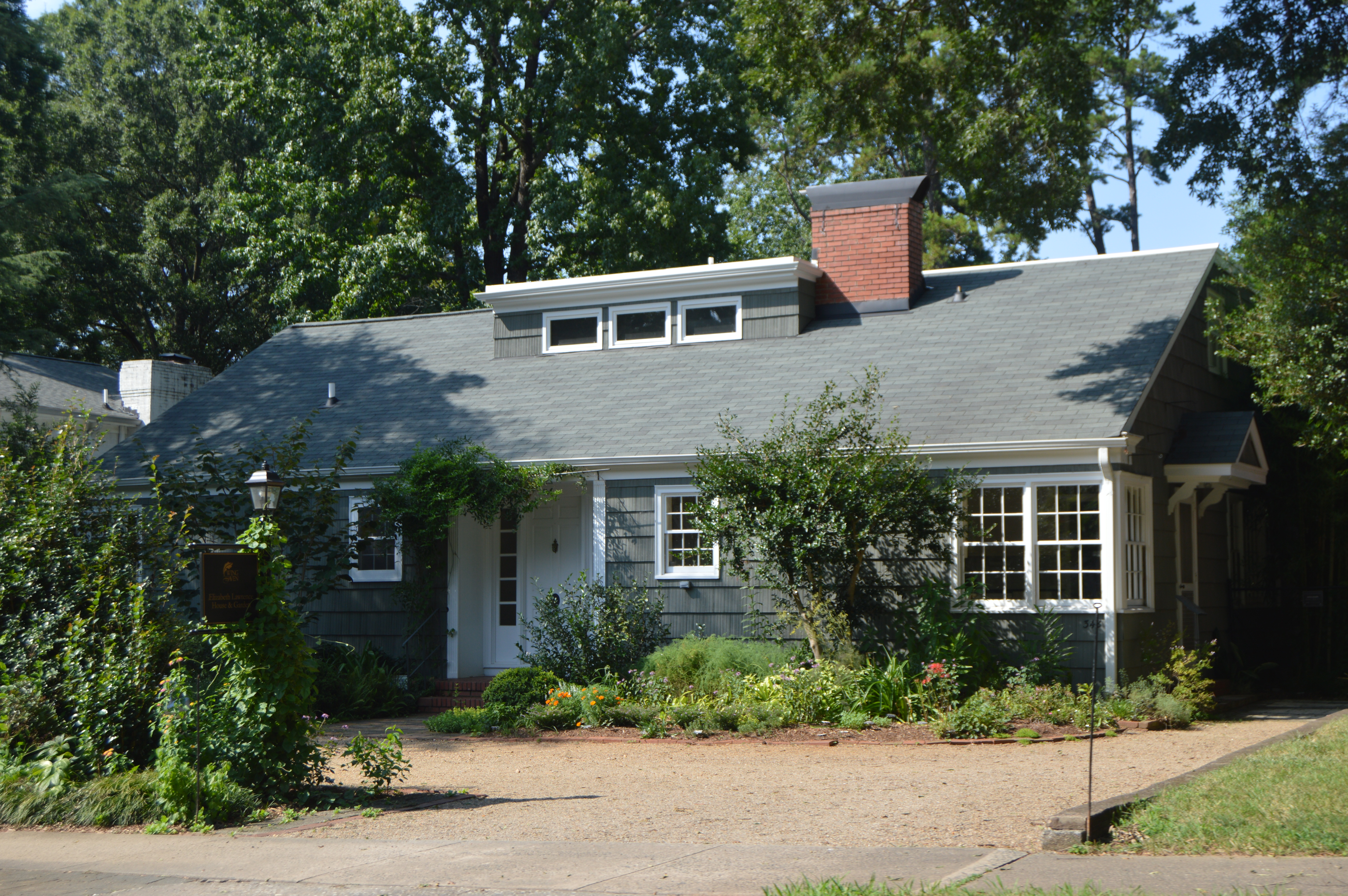
- Front

- Location within North Carolina Location within the United States
- Location: 348 Ridgewood Ave., Charlotte, North Carolina
- Coordinates: 35°10′47″N 80°50′37″W
- Area: less than one acre
- Built: 1948
- Architect: Elizabeth Lewis Lawrence
- Architectural style: Colonial Revival
- Website: winghavengardens.org
- NRHP reference No.: 06000866
- Added to NRHP: September 14, 2006

Elizabeth Lawrence House & Garden is a historic home and garden located at Charlotte, Mecklenburg County, North Carolina. It was built in 1948–1949, and is a small 1 1/2-story, five-bay, Colonial Revival style frame dwelling. The house is set on landscaped grounds designed and laid out in 1949–1950. It includes paths, beds, and borders. It was the home of Elizabeth Lawrence (1904-1985), American garden writer and the first woman graduate in landscape architecture from (present-day) North Carolina State University.

Charlotte-Mecklenburg Historic Landmarks Commission designed the property a historic landmark in 2005 and it was listed on the National Register of Historic Places in 2009.

Elizabeth Lawrence moved away from the property in 1984. In 1986, Mary Elizabeth "Lindie" Wilson purchased the property, and immediately started resurrecting the garden, which had fallen into disrepair. Lindie Wilson's incredible stewardship for the next 23 years ensured the survival of a significant number of plants original to Elizabeth Lawrence--most still thrive in the garden to this day. During her ownership, Lindie Wilson engaged the help of many regional and national experts to figure out the best way to preserve the property, out of which was born the Friends of Elizabeth Lawrence. The Friends worked tirelessly to help Lindie place a conservation easement on the property and negotiate the terms of sale of the property to the Wing Haven Foundation in 2008.

Today, the Elizabeth Lawrence House & Garden is open to the public as a historic and cultural resource. It is owned and operated by the Wing Haven Foundation, and managed in a partnership with The Garden Conservancy, which holds the conservation easement on the property. The house and garden are part of Wing Haven.
