= University of North Carolina at Charlotte Botanical Gardens =

Botanical gardens at the University of North Carolina at Charlotte

Coordinates: 35.3080°N 80.7285°W

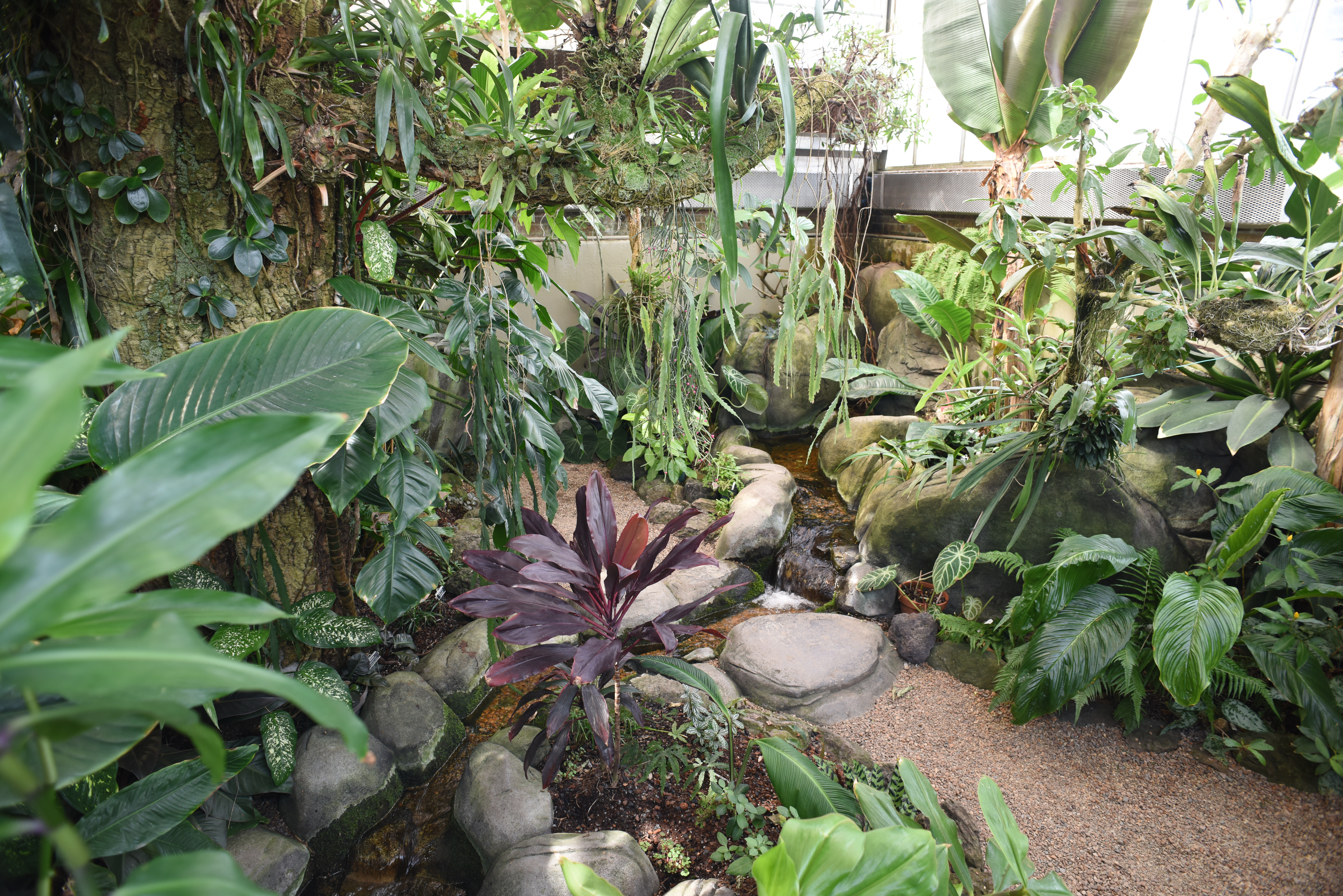
- One of the arrangements in the McMillan Greenhouse.
- Interactive map of University of North Carolina at Charlotte Botanical Gardens
- Type: Botanical garden
- Owner: University of North Carolina at Charlotte
- Website: gardens.charlotte.edu

The University of North Carolina at Charlotte Botanical Gardens, sometimes called the Charlotte Botanical Gardens, are botanical gardens located at the University of North Carolina at Charlotte.

Major collections within the gardens are as follows:

- McMillan Greenhouse (4000 square feet) - five environments: American and African deserts; orchids, bromeliads, ferns, African violet relatives, and other tropical plants; Cymbidium and Dendrobium orchids; carnivorous pitcher plants, sundews, and Venus Flytraps native to the southeastern United States; tropical regions of both the Old and New Worlds.
- Carnivorous Plants - including an extensive collection of Sarracenia
- Orchids - collection includes Brassavola, Bulbophyllum, Catasetum, Cattleya, Cymbidium, Dendrobium, Epidendrum, Phragmipedium, Peristeria, and Phalaenopsis.
- Ralph Van Landingham Glen - Begun in 1966, the Glen now contains a major collection (3500 plants) of rhododendron and azalea shrubs, as well as more than 900 species of indigenous trees, shrubs, and wildflowers, and more than 50 species of wild ferns.
- Susie Harwood Garden (3 acres) - collections of dwarf conifers, Japanese maples, viburnum, and azaleas, plus other trees, shrubs, vines, annuals, perennials, bulbs, succulents, and water plants from around the world, with an Asian-style gazebo, arched bridges, and a moon gate.
- Dinosaur's Garden - primitive plants surrounding a full-size Deinonychus skeleton sculpture.

The Botanical Gardens also serve as the final resting place of UNC Charlotte founder Bonnie Cone.

== See also ==
- List of botanical gardens in the United States
