= Bryant Park (Charlotte, North Carolina) =

Park in North Carolina, US

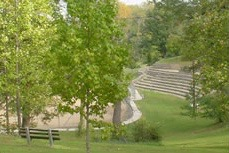
- Interactive map of Bryant Park
- Type: Public park
- Location: Charlotte, North Carolina
- Coordinates: 35.2275°N 80.8706°W
- Area: 8.7 acres (3.5 ha)
- Created: 1935
- Operator: Mecklenburg County Parks and Recreation
- Website: Bryant Park

Bryant Park is an 8.7-acre urban park at 1701 West Morehead Street in the Historic Camp Greene neighborhood of Charlotte, North Carolina. It contains a softball field and a multi-purpose public field. In 2003, the Charlotte-Mecklenburg Historic Landmarks Commission designated Bryant Park as a historic landmark.

Constructed in the 1930s as part of a WPA project, Bryant Park is noted for its unique network of stone walls and seating that overlook the softball game fields. It was built on land donated by prominent Charlotte developer E. C. Griffith and was one of the first projects of the Charlotte Park and Recreation Commission.

In the 1960s and 1970s, when the Charlotte Parks Commission was underfunded and mostly powerless, intense industrial development on West Morehead Street forced Bryant Park to give up much of its original space, which is now less than half its original size. Despite these, it remains the only public green space in Charlotte's West Morehead Street industrial sector.
