= North Carolina Botanical Garden =

Botanical garden in Chapel Hill, North Carolina, United States

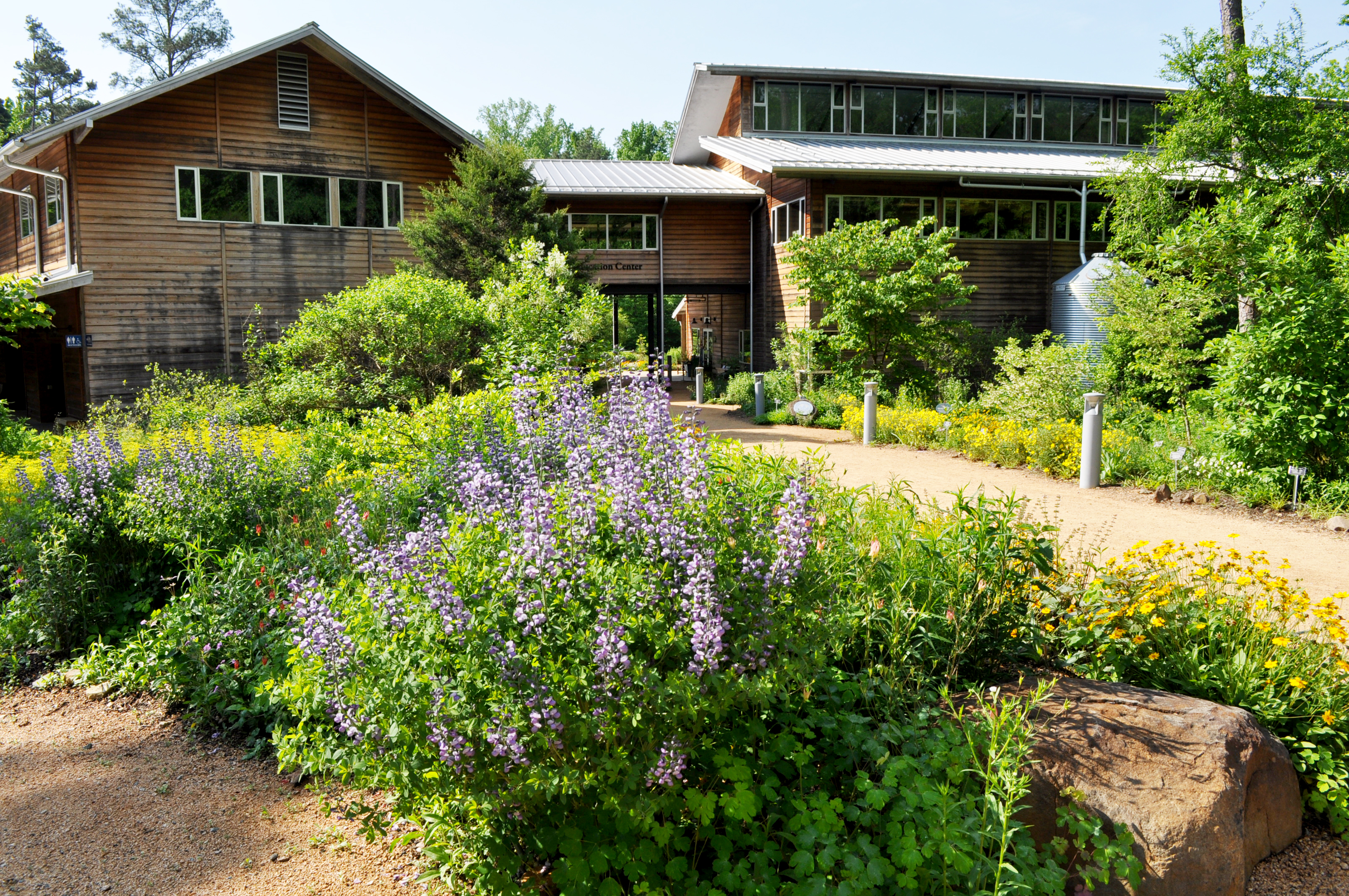
- Interactive map of North Carolina Botanical Garden
- Location: Chapel Hill, North Carolina
- Area: 700 acres (1.1 sq mi; 2.8 km^{2})
- Opened: 1951
- Species: 2,500
- Website: ncbg.unc.edu

The North Carolina Botanical Garden is a botanical garden operated by the University of North Carolina at Chapel Hill in Chapel Hill, North Carolina. The primary goal of the Garden is to research, catalog, and promote the native plant species of North Carolina.

== History ==
The history of the Garden begins in 1903, when Professor William Chambers Coker began planting trees and shrubs on the central campus (now Coker Arboretum). In 1952, the Trustees of the university dedicated 70 acres (280,000 m^{2}) forested for development of a botanical garden. An additional 103 acres (0.42 km^{2}) were donated by William Lanier Hunt. Considerable additions and expansion of the Garden took place from the 1960s onward. A recent expansion effort is the James and Delight Allen Education Center, designed by architect Frank Harmon, the first LEED Platinum certified state-owned building or public museum in North Carolina.

== The Garden today ==
Today the Garden comprises 14 collections and display gardens, containing some 5,900 accessions representing about 2,500 species of the 4,700 plant species known to be native or naturalized in North and South Carolina. It has become one of the largest native plant botanical gardens in the Southeastern United States. Admission is free. The Garden is open Tuesday through Sunday, with special educational programs offered regularly. Highlights of the Garden include:

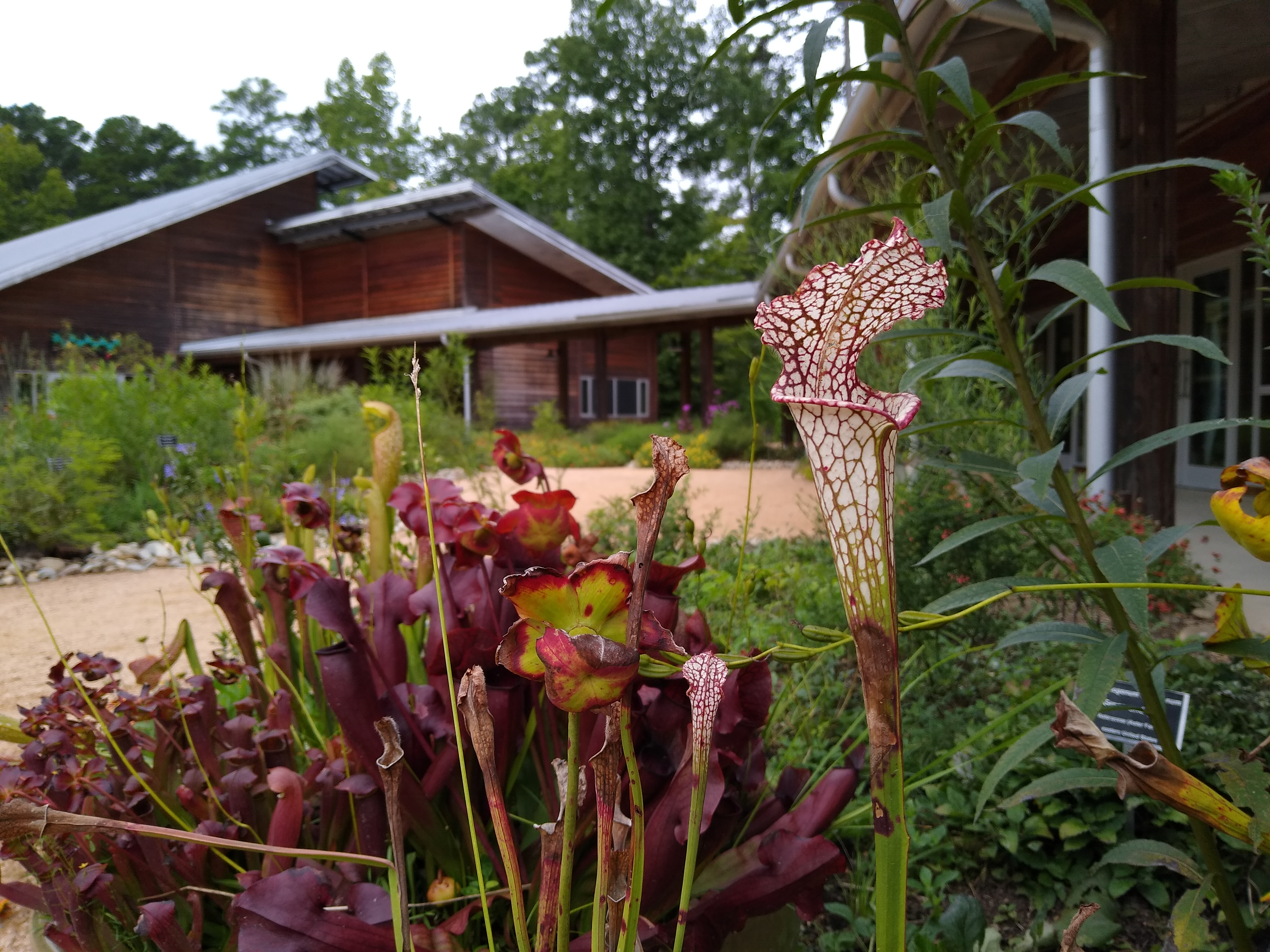
Carnivorous plants on display.

- Battle Park, 90 acres (360,000 m^{2}) – forest land in the center of the Chapel Hill.
- Coker Arboretum
- The Fern Collection, containing Southeastern fern species.
- Horticultural Therapy Demonstration Garden – heirloom vegetables and flowers varieties in plantings designed for persons with limited mobility and reach.
- William Lanier Hunt Arboretum
- Mason Farm Biological Reserve, 367 acres (1.5 km^{2}) – natural area.
- Native Plant Border – native perennials, shrubs, and small trees.
- UNC Herbarium (earliest collections 1835) – 750,000 natural history specimens documenting the identity and distribution of plants in North Carolina and the Southeast.
- Several Display Gardens

The garden also contains a cabin in which playwright and professor Paul Green (1894–1981) performed most of his research and writing. It was moved to the garden in 1991.

== Exhibitions and Art Programs ==
In addition to caring for native plants, the Garden encourages art programs and exhibitions that promote its mission. This includes a variety of botanical art courses and opportunities for local artists to showcase their art that relates to the natural world. These opportunities include an annual Sculpture in the Garden exhibit and a Certificate in Botanical Art and Illustration program.

== See also ==
- List of botanical gardens in the United States
