= Coker Arboretum =

Arboretum in Chapel Hill, North Carolina

- Interactive map of Coker Arboretum
- Type: Arboretum
- Location: Chapel Hill, North Carolina
- Coordinates: 35°54′49.5″N 79°2′56.3″W
- Area: 5.3 acres (0.0 sq mi; 0.0 km^{2})
- Opened: 1903
- Founder: Dr. William Chambers Coker
- Website: ncbg.unc.edu/visit/coker-arboretum/

Coker Arboretum (5.3 acres) is an arboretum within the North Carolina Botanical Garden on the campus of the University of North Carolina, Chapel Hill, North Carolina. The collection consists of a wide variety of plantings including flowering trees and shrubs as well as bulb and perennial displays. It is open daily without charge.

The arboretum was established in 1903 by Dr. William Chambers Coker, the university's first Professor of Botany and the first chair of the University Buildings and Grounds Committee. Coker loved East Asian species and added many throughout the 1920s into the 1940s, including conifers and one Metasequoia, as well as daffodils and daylilies. Two prominent features are a native vine arbor (300 feet long) and an adjacent stone circle.

== See also ==
- North Carolina Botanical Garden
- List of botanical gardens in the United States
