= Search and rescue in the United States =

American search and rescue resources

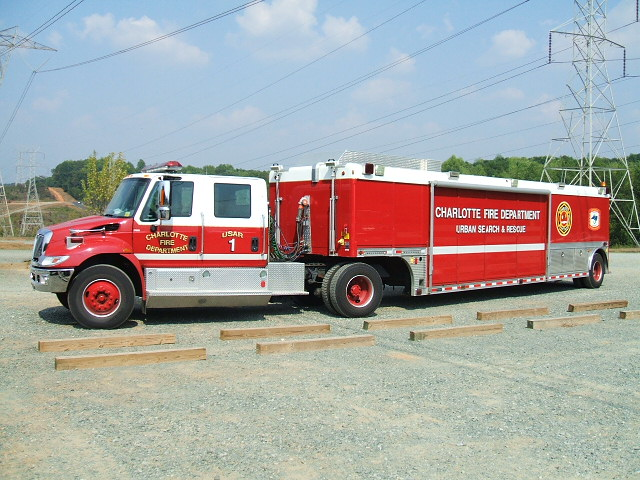
Charlotte Fire Department Urban Search and Rescue vehicle

Search and rescue in the United States involves a wide range of organizations that have search and rescue responsibilities.

In January 2008, the United States Department of Homeland Security (DHS) released the National Response Framework (NRF) which serves as the guiding document for a federal response during a national emergency. In addition to the NRF, there are 15 annexes relating to Emergency Support Functions (ESF), which include other federal agencies that contain resources or expertise to support an emergency. Search and Rescue is included in ESF-9 and divides SAR into four primary elements while assigning a federal agency the lead role for each of the four elements.

- Structural Collapse-USAR: Department of Homeland Security Federal Emergency Management Agency
- Waterborne: United States Coast Guard, United States Coast Guard Auxiliary
- Inland-wilderness: United States Department of Interior, National Park Service
- Aeronautical: United States Air Force Rescue Coordination Center, Civil Air Patrol, United States Air Force Aerospace Rescue and Recovery Service, US Navy (secondary missions for helicopter squadrons)

In the U.S., SAR standards are developed primarily by ASTM International and the National Fire Protection Association (NFPA), which are then used by organizations such as the Mountain Rescue Association (MRA), the National Association of Search and Rescue (NASAR), and the NFPA to develop training that will meet or exceed those standards. Within ASTM International, most standards of relevance to SAR are developed by Committee F32 on Search and Rescue. Formed in 1988, the committee has 85 current members and a jurisdiction of 38 approved standards.

== National organizations ==
- Explorer Search and Rescue
- Mountain Rescue Association
- National Association for Search and Rescue
- National Association of Volunteer Search and Rescue Teams

== State organizations ==
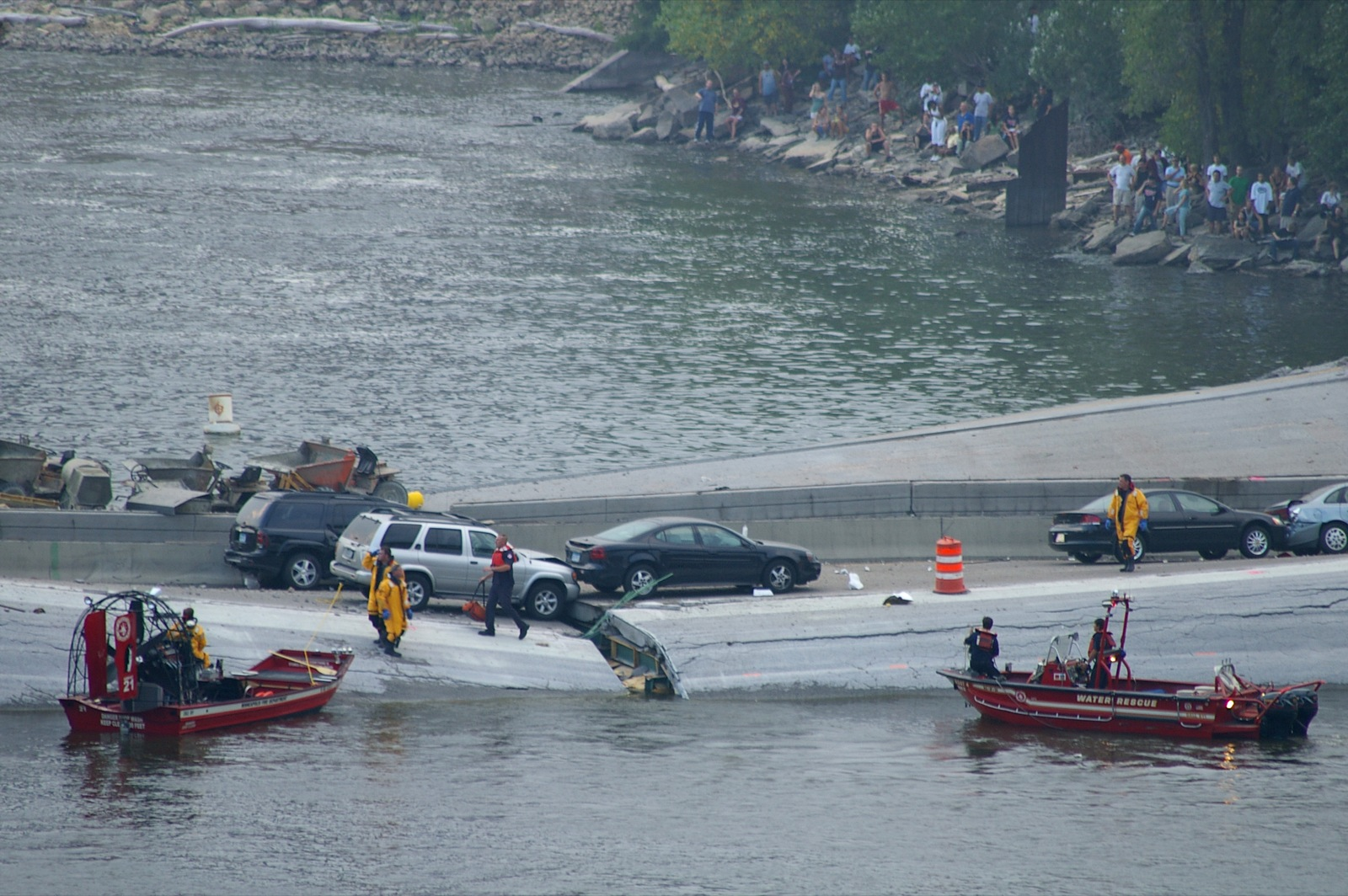
Rescue workers and boats on the central span and the I-35W Mississippi River bridge collapse, Minneapolis, Minnesota 1 August 2007

Alabama

- Alabama Association of Rescue Squads
- Alabama Search and Rescue
- Red Mountain Search Dog Association

California

- San Luis Obispo County Search and Rescue
- Bay Area Search and Rescue Council
- Marin County Sheriff's Office Search & Rescue
- San Mateo County Search and Rescue
- Long Beach Search & Rescue
- San Diego Mountain Rescue Team
- Montrose Search and Rescue Team
- Altadena Mountain Rescue Team
- Sierra Madre Search and Rescue Team
- Antelope Valley Search and Rescue
- Malibu Search and Rescue Team
- Santa Clarita Valley Search and Rescue Team
- San Dimas Mountain Rescue Team

Colorado

- Arapahoe Rescue Patrol
- Colorado Search and Rescue Association (CSAR)
- Rampart Search and Rescue
- Mesa County Search and Rescue

Florida

- Brothers to the Rescue

Maryland

- Maryland Department of Natural Resources Police

Michigan

- Michigan Search and Rescue
- K-9 ONE Search and Rescue

Missouri

- Urban Search and Rescue Missouri Task Force 1

New Jersey

- Urban Search and Rescue New Jersey Task Force 1
- New Jersey Search and Rescue

New Mexico

- New Mexico Search and Rescue Council

New York

- Urban Search and Rescue New York Task Force 1
- Westchester County Technical Rescue Team
- New York Search And Rescue - Serving the Lower Hudson Valley
- Long Island Search and Rescue - Primarily serving Suffolk and Nassau Counties
- New York State Federation of Search and Rescue Teams - Statewide listing of SAR teams
- Lower Adirondack Search and Rescue - Serving all of New York State - Primarily the Adirondack Region wilderness

North Carolina

- NCCERT (North Carolina Canine Emergency Response Team)

Ohio

- Rapid Assistance to Community Emergencies - Search and Rescue

Oregon

- Multnomah County Sheriff's Office Search and Rescue
- North Oregon Regional Search and Rescue
- Portland Mountain Rescue

Pennsylvania

- East Penn Search and Rescue
- Urban Search and Rescue Pennsylvania Task Force 1

Virginia

Virginia benefits from a state-coordinated system of training and response under the Virginia Department of Emergency Management (VDEM). Under Title 44 of the Code of Virginia, VDEM develops and maintains the Commonwealth of Virginia Emergency Operations Plan (COVEOP) that includes the ESF-9 Annex for Search and Rescue. Similar to the federal version of ESF-9 under the National Response Framework (NRF), VDEM divides SAR into four primary elements. While VDEM functions as the lead for ESF-9, many agencies, departments, and volunteer organizations routinely respond to and support SAR operations in the Commonwealth of Virginia.

Washington

- Washington State Search and Rescue Volunteer Advisory Council
- Jefferson County Search and Rescue
- King County Search and Rescue Association
- Seattle Mountain Rescue
- Snohomish County Volunteer Search and Rescue
- Spokane County Search and Rescue
- Pierce County Search and Rescue Council
- Washington Air Search and Rescue

== Aeronautical ==
Search and rescue services for downed, missing, or overdue aircraft and Emergency Locator Transmitters (ELTs). Organizations include:

- Civil Air Patrol
- Virginia State Police, Aviation Division

== Inland/Wilderness ==
For search and rescue of lost and missing persons in a wide variety of circumstances and environments, resources include:

- Amherst County Search and Rescue
- Appalachian Professional Tracking Group
- Appalachian Search and Rescue Conference
- Black Diamond Search and Rescue Council
- Blue and Gray Search and Rescue Dogs
- Blue Ridge Mountain Rescue Group
- DOGS-East Search and Rescue
- Greater Atlantic Rescue Dogs
- Jefferson County Search Dog Association
- K-9 Alert Search and Rescue
- Piedmont Search and Rescue
- Search and Rescue Dogs of Maryland
- Southwest Virginia Mountain Rescue Group
- Tidewater Search and Rescue

== Maritime/Waterborne ==
Providing search and rescue for vessels in distress in coastal and inland waters, resources include:

- Virginia Department of Game and Inland Fisheries
- Virginia Marine Resources Commission
- United States Coast Guard
- Smith Point Volunteer Sea Rescue
- Eckerd College Search and Rescue

== USAR/Disaster ==
To provide response in the event of collapsed structures and significant events, organizations include:

- Maryland Task Force 1
- Virginia Task Force 1
- Virginia Task Force 2
