= Bernard Fontaine =

Brigadier General Bernard Fontaine
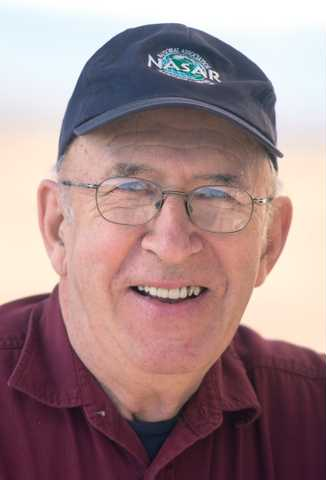
- Bernard Fontaine at the NASAR Board of Directors Mtg.
- Born: Bernard Arthur Fontaine; March 2, 1940 (age 86)
- Education: Branau University of Georgia
- Spouse: Silvia Fontaine
- Military career
- Allegiance: United States of America
- Branch: United States Army, Army National Guard
- Service years: 1960–1990
- Rank: Brigadier General (Retired)
- Nickname: "Bernie"
- Conflicts: Vietnam War
- Other work: NASAR (National Association for Search and Rescue), Board of Directors

Bernard Fontaine (born March 2, 1940) has served in the United States Army and as a volunteer firefighter, Search and Rescue, and deacon. He spent 30 years of his life in the military, working on many large engineering projects with the staff at the Pentagon level. This includes the Army Mountain Warfare School Training Facility at the Camp Ethan Allen Training Site in Jericho, Vermont, and Army Tank and Armored Vehicle Centralized Wash Facility at Fort Stewart, Savannah Georgia. In early 2014 he qualified for the U.S. House of Representatives in the State of Georgia's 9th Congressional District election. He is challenging the incumbent for the Republican Party primary.

He is serving with the Georgia State Defense Force as the Senior Advisor to the Commanding General for Search and Rescue Operations. He also served as a Union County (Georgia) Firefighter ‒ NPQ 2.

He is on the board of directors for the National Association for Search and Rescue (NASAR), and is an instructor, lead evaluator SARTECH I, Community Emergency Response Team (CERT) instructor, and CPR instructor.

== Biography ==
=== Early life ===
Fontaine grew up in a rural farming community during World War II. He spent his early years working on local farms, saving his money to buy a junk car, and taught himself mechanics to work on them. He attended and received a degree at the local College of Agriculture. Soon joining the US Army and working his way through the ranks.

=== Military service ===
Fontaine entered the US Army as a Private in 1960 at the age of 20. He then ascended the ranks to Sergeant, while serving in West Germany during the Cold War. After returning to the US he attended further training in the US Army at Fort Dix, New Jersey, for radio and Officer Candidate School, graduating as a Second Lieutenant. He continued his Army training with Airborne School at Fort Benning (Columbus, Georgia) and U.S. Army Ranger School (Dahlonega, Georgia) in 1966. He remained in the US at Fort Huachuca (southeast Arizona), until he was ordered to serve in the Vietnam War in 1967. During a time of turmoil in the U.S., he served his tour of duty. During the 1970s and 1980s he ascended through the ranks as Captain, Major, Lt. Colonel, and Colonel as an Engineer Officer and Management. After 30 years military service he retired as a brigadier general in 1990.

=== Small business/farm owner ===
After finishing his tour of duty in Vietnam in 1968 at the age of 28, he took a break from active service and joined the National Guard. While in the National Guard he used his life savings and started his own construction/grading business, buying equipment and trucks to maintain roads and excavate/grade land for new homes. Also during the early 1970s, using his own money, he bought land and built a housing development/subdivision. In the mid-1970s, he was offered and accepted an engineering position to maintain the buildings and training facilities for the Army National Guard as Captain. In 1979, he was promoted to director of all State of Georgia Army National Guard facilities as the State of Georgia Facilities Management Officer. Retiring in 1990, he now farms his land in Suches, which lie in the mountains of North Georgia – located between the cities of Dahlonega and Blairsville.

=== Retirement ===
After retiring from the Georgia National Guard in 1990, he started teaching at the local college. He became an instructor of political science and Night Dean at DeKalb College and also at the Georgia Military College in Milledgeville, Georgia. In 2005 he took a position as the County Manager for Jasper County, Georgia, one of the larger counties in the State of Georgia with over 370sq miles. While County Manager he was also a volunteer firefighter. He serves on the board of the National Association for Search and Rescue, and teaches search and rescue techniques.

Service to community:

- Union County Firefighter ‒ NPQ 2
- National Association for Search and Rescue (NASAR), National Board of Directors,

- Instructor, Lead Evaluator SARTECH I
- Community Emergency Response Team (CERT) Instructor (Federal Emergency Management Agency)
- CPR Instructor (American Heart Association)

- Jasper County Firefighter

== Personal data ==
He has been married to Silvia for 60 years. Soon after they were married, he was shipped to Vietnam. As a military wife she remained stateside and cared for their two children. Silvia is a retired Registered Nurse, Certified Family Nurse Practitioner who writes professionally. Her latest book was published in 2013 and is titled Mountain Tribulations. They have four grown children, and 12 grandchildren. He is a Christian, and a Deacon at his local church.

He ran for Congress, and on the Republican ticket launched his campaign for U.S. House of Representatives with the US economy, and leadership as the focus of his run for office in the State of Georgia's 9th District.

== Timeline ==
- 1965 – Graduated Non-Commissioned Officer Academy, Honor graduate
- 1966 – Graduated Officer Candidate School Fort Benning, Georgia, 2nd Lieutenant (Airborne Ranger, Vietnam Veteran)
- 1976 – Graduated from Command and General Staff College
- 1990 – Retired from full-time military service
- 1990–2004 – Instructor of Political Science, Night Dean at DeKalb College and at Georgia Military College
- 2012 – Serving with the Georgia State Defense Force as Senior Advisor to the Commanding General for Search and Rescue Operations.

== Publications ==
- Fontaine, Bernard. "The Origin of the Georgia Militia". Journal of the Historical Society of the Georgia National Guard.
- Fontaine, Bernard. "The Origin of the Georgia Militia". Journal of the Historical Society of the Georgia National Guard. Archived from the original on 3 May 2014.
