= 2012 Coca-Cola 600 =

Race details
- Race 12 of 36 in the 2012 NASCAR Sprint Cup Series
- 2012 Coca-Cola 600 program cover, with artwork by NASCAR artist, Sam Bass. The painting is called "LET FREEDOM RACE!"
- Date: May 27, 2012
- Location: Charlotte Motor Speedway in Concord, North Carolina
- Course: Permanent racing facility
- Course length: 1.5 miles (2.4 km)
- Distance: 400 laps, 600 mi (965.606 km)
- Weather: Sunshine with a high temperature around 88 °F (31 °C); wind out of the SSE at 2 mph (3.2 km/h).
- Average speed: 155.687 miles per hour (250.554 km/h)

Pole position
Driver	Aric Almirola	Richard Petty Motorsports
- Time: 27.988

Most laps led
Driver	Greg Biffle	Roush Fenway Racing
- Laps: 204

Winner
No. 5	Kasey Kahne	Hendrick Motorsports

Television in the United States
- Network: Fox
- Announcers: Mike Joy, Darrell Waltrip and Larry McReynolds

The 2012 Coca-Cola 600, the 53rd annual race, was a NASCAR Sprint Cup Series race held on May 27, 2012, at Charlotte Motor Speedway in Concord, North Carolina. Contested over 400 laps, it was the twelfth race of the 2012 season. Kasey Kahne of Hendrick Motorsports took his first win of the season, while Denny Hamlin finished second and Kyle Busch finished third.

== Report ==
=== Background ===
Charlotte Motor Speedway, the race track where the race was held.

Charlotte Motor Speedway is one of ten intermediate tracks to hold NASCAR races. The standard track at Charlotte Motor Speedway is a four-turn quad-oval track that is 1.5 miles (2.4 km) long. The track's turns are banked at twenty-four degrees, while the front stretch, the location of the finish line, is five degrees. The back stretch, opposite of the front, also had a five degree banking. The racetrack has seats for 140,000 spectators.

Before the race, Greg Biffle led the Drivers' Championship with 411 points, while Matt Kenseth stood in second with 409. Dale Earnhardt Jr. was third in the Drivers' Championship with 397 points, three points ahead of Denny Hamlin and twenty-five ahead of Jimmie Johnson in fourth and fifth. Martin Truex Jr. with 372 was three points ahead of Tony Stewart, as Kevin Harvick with 361 points, was twelve ahead of Kyle Busch, and twenty-four in front of Carl Edwards. In the Manufacturers' Championship, Chevrolet was leading with 72 points, eight ahead of Toyota. Ford, with 57 points, was eight points ahead of Dodge in the battle for third. Harvick was the race's defending race winner after winning it in 2011.

The Coca-Cola 600 was conceived by race car driver Curtis Turner, who built the Charlotte Motor Speedway. It was first held in 1960 in an attempt by NASCAR to stage a Memorial Day weekend race to compete with the open-wheel Indianapolis 500; the two races were held together on the same day starting from 1974. The race is the longest in terms of distance on the NASCAR calendar and is considered by several drivers to be one of the sport's most important races alongside the Daytona 500, the Brickyard 400 and the Southern 500. The long distance makes it the most physically demanding event in NASCAR, and teams adapt to changing track conditions because the race occurs between late afternoon and evening. It was known as the World 600 until 1984 when The Coca-Cola Company purchased the naming rights to the race and renamed it the Coca-Cola World 600 in 1985. It has been called the Coca-Cola 600 every year since 1986 except for 2002 when the name changed to Coca-Cola Racing Family 600.

=== Practice and qualifying ===
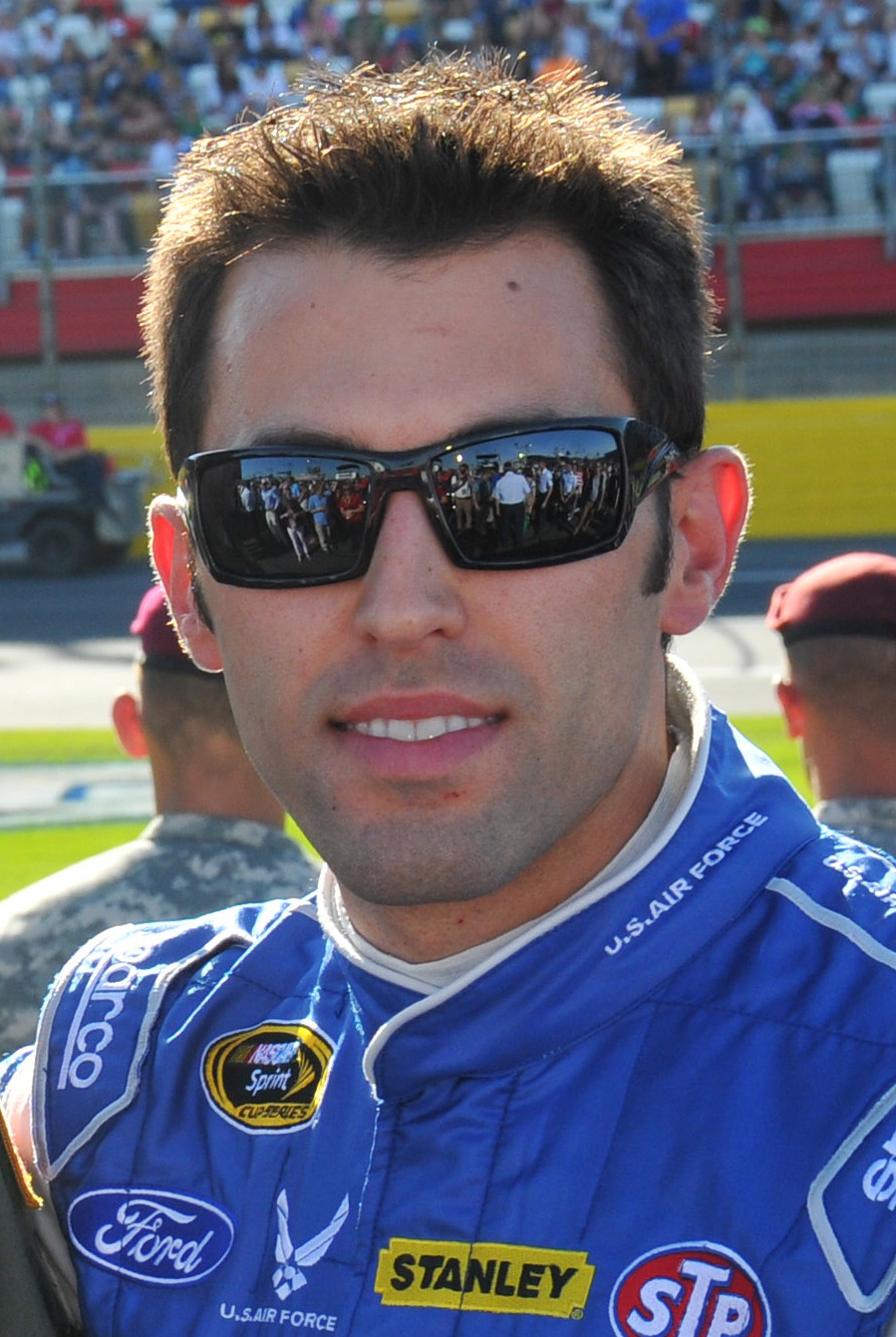
Aric Almirola qualified on the pole position for Richard Petty Motorsports

Three practice sessions were held before the race; the first on May 24, 2012, which lasted 120 minutes. The second and third took place on Saturday, May 26, 2012. The first Saturday practice lasted 55 minutes, while the second was 60 minutes. Marcos Ambrose was quickest with a time of 28.539 seconds in the first session, five-thousandths of a second faster than Landon Cassill. A. J. Allmendinger was third quickest, followed by Biffle, Clint Bowyer, and Aric Almirola. Joey Logano was seventh, still within two-tenths of a second of Ambrose's time.

Forty-seven cars were entered for qualifying on May 24, 2012, but only forty-three could qualify for the race because of NASCAR's qualifying procedure. Almirola of Richard Petty Motorsports clinched the first pole position of his Sprint Cup Series career, with a time of 27.988 seconds. He was joined on the front row of the grid by his teammate Ambrose. Johnson qualified third, Biffle took fourth, and Bowyer started fifth. Mark Martin, Kasey Kahne, Hamlin, Paul Menard and Regan Smith rounded out the top ten. Kurt Busch failed to finish his qualifying lap after colliding into the SAFER barrier, but will remain on the grid as his team is in the Top 35 in owner's points. The four drivers that failed to qualify for the race were Mike Bliss, David Reutimann, J. J. Yeley and Scott Riggs.

Once the qualifying session was completed, Almirola stated "It's a huge honor just to see it in victory lane (for the pole celebration). I'm driving probably the most iconic car in history of the sport. It's just qualifying, but that's a start." Afterward, Johnson, who won the week before in the 2012 NASCAR Sprint All-Star Race, commented about their recent performances, "I'm real proud of where our equipment is going." He continued, "I've been able to race better than where we qualify."

In the second practice session, Hamlin was fastest with a time of 28.995 seconds, less than two-hundredths of a second quicker than second-placed Menard. Edwards took third place, ahead of Truex Jr., Johnson and Brad Keselowski. Bowyer, Harvick and Ryan Newman completed the ten quickest drivers in the session. In the third and final practice, Keselowski was quickest with a time of 29.397 seconds. Edwards followed in second, ahead of Martin and Johnson. Logano was fifth quickest, with a time of 29.521 seconds. Stewart, Kenseth, Allmendinger, Kurt Busch, and Jeff Burton rounded out the first ten positions. Hamlin, who was quickest in the second session, could only manage 20th.

=== Race ===
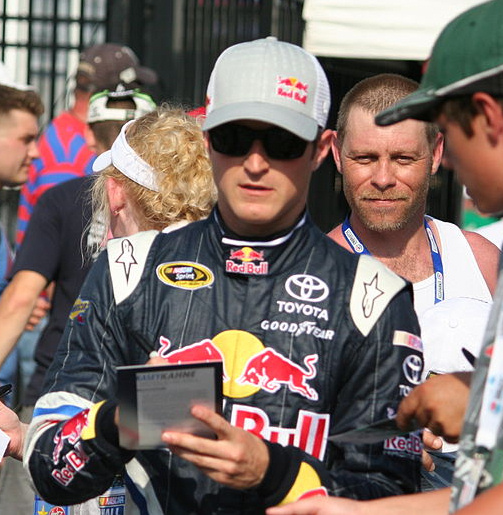
Kasey Kahne won the race for Hendrick Motorsports

The race, the twelfth in the season, began at 6:00 p.m. EDT and was televised live in the United States on Fox. The conditions on the grid were dry before the race, the air temperature at 80 °F (27 °C); mostly clear skies were expected. Darrell Waltrip began pre-race ceremonies, by giving the invocation. Next, Charlotte Fire Department Pipe Bag played "Amazing Grace", then Darius Rucker performed the national anthem. Afterward, retired U.S. Navy admiral, Frank Thorp and director of the United States Army Wounded Warrior Program, Gregory Gadson, with the addition of actress Brooklyn Decker gave the command for drivers to start their engines.

Following the traditional three pace laps, Phoenix Racing's Kurt Busch dropped to the rear of the grid due to changing to a backup car after crashing in qualifying. Richard Petty Motorsports teammates Almirola and Ambrose led the 43-car field to the green flag, the teammates swapped the lead for the first 8 laps until Roush Fenway Racing's Biffle assumed the top spot on lap 9 from Ambrose. While Ambrose retook the lead from Biffle on lap 15, Almirola steadily fell back to 5th place. By lap 23, Biffle retook the lead from Ambrose and moved out to a 1-second lead. On lap 41, Allmendinger was the first driver to pit in a series of green-flag pit stops. Biffle made his stop along with Johnson on lap 47 and was able to hold the lead after pit stops were completed.

The race continued under green, and drivers stopped for another round of pit stops between laps 87 and 97. Once again, Biffle was one of the last cars to pit, and came out with the lead, extending it to 4 seconds. On lap 111, the first caution of the race came out when debris was sighted on the backstretch. The leaders pitted, and Ambrose and Jamie McMurray took two right side tires on their stops to claim the top two spots. However, McMurray was forced back into the pits after the restart for a loose wheel. On lap 125, Kyle Busch grabbed the lead from Biffle, who took it back two laps later after Busch dipped the tires below the white line. Debris was spotted in turn 1, forcing the second caution of the race. All the leaders pitted except for Jeff Gordon. On the restart on lap 139, Busch, Johnson, and Biffle easily dispatched Gordon to take the top three spots. Kasey Kahne scores a victory in his 300th career start. Kahne set a record by winning the first 600-mile race in under four hours.

== Results ==
=== Qualifying ===
Grid	No.	Driver	Team	Manufacturer	Time (s)	Speed (mph)	Speed (km/h)
1	43	Aric Almirola	Richard Petty Motorsports	Ford	27.988	192.940	310.507
2	9	Marcos Ambrose	Richard Petty Motorsports	Ford	28.184	191.598	308.347
3	48	Jimmie Johnson	Hendrick Motorsports	Chevrolet	28.217	191.374	307.987
4	16	Greg Biffle	Roush Fenway Racing	Ford	28.234	191.259	307.802
5	15	Clint Bowyer	Michael Waltrip Racing	Toyota	28.243	191.198	307.703
6	55	Mark Martin	Michael Waltrip Racing	Toyota	28.247	191.171	307.660
7	5	Kasey Kahne	Hendrick Motorsports	Chevrolet	28.253	191.130	307.594
8	11	Denny Hamlin	Joe Gibbs Racing	Toyota	28.289	190.887	307.203
9	27	Paul Menard	Richard Childress Racing	Chevrolet	28.332	190.597	306.736
10	78	Regan Smith	Furniture Row Racing	Chevrolet	28.353	190.456	306.509
11	22	A. J. Allmendinger	Penske Racing	Dodge	28.372	190.329	306.305
12	88	Dale Earnhardt Jr.	Hendrick Motorsports	Chevrolet	28.376	190.302	306.261
13	21	Trevor Bayne	Wood Brothers Racing	Ford	28.381	190.268	306.207
14	29	Kevin Harvick	Richard Childress Racing	Chevrolet	28.391	190.201	306.099
15	56	Martin Truex Jr.	Michael Waltrip Racing	Toyota	28.392	190.194	306.088
16	39	Ryan Newman	Stewart–Haas Racing	Chevrolet	28.413	190.054	305.862
17	18	Kyle Busch	Joe Gibbs Racing	Toyota	28.416	190.034	305.830
18	83	Landon Cassill	BK Racing	Toyota	28.423	189.987	305.754
19	20	Joey Logano	Joe Gibbs Racing	Toyota	28.465	189.707	305.304
20	17	Matt Kenseth	Roush Fenway Racing	Ford	28.480	189.607	305.143
21	14	Tony Stewart	Stewart–Haas Racing	Chevrolet	28.485	189.574	305.090
22	31	Jeff Burton	Richard Childress Racing	Chevrolet	28.493	189.520	305.003
23	24	Jeff Gordon	Hendrick Motorsports	Chevrolet	28.560	189.076	304.288
24	2	Brad Keselowski	Penske Racing	Dodge	28.591	188.871	303.958
25	13	Casey Mears	Germain Racing	Ford	28.668	188.363	303.141
26	47	Bobby Labonte	JTG Daugherty Racing	Toyota	28.671	188.344	303.110
27	74	Cole Whitt	Turn One Racing	Chevrolet	28.674	188.324	303.078
28	99	Carl Edwards	Roush Fenway Racing	Ford	28.692	188.206	302.888
29	42	Juan Pablo Montoya	Earnhardt Ganassi Racing	Chevrolet	28.735	187.924	302.434
30	34	David Ragan	Front Row Motorsports	Ford	28.776	187.656	302.003
31	1	Jamie McMurray	Earnhardt Ganassi Racing	Chevrolet	28.796	187.526	301.794
32	98	Michael McDowell	Phil Parsons Racing	Ford	28.802	187.487	301.731
33	26	Josh Wise	Front Row Motorsports	Ford	28.837	187.259	301.364
34	33	Stephen Leicht	Circle Sport Racing	Chevrolet	28.851	187.169	301.219
35	30	David Stremme	Inception Motorsports	Toyota	29.010	186.143	299.568
36	36	Dave Blaney	Tommy Baldwin Racing	Chevrolet	29.015	186.111	299.517
37	93	Travis Kvapil	BK Racing	Toyota	29.019	186.085	299.475
38	95	Scott Speed	Leavine Family Racing	Ford	29.036	185.976	299.299
39	38	David Gilliland	Front Row Motorsports	Ford	29.062	185.810	299.032
40	10	Danica Patrick	Tommy Baldwin Racing	Chevrolet	29.161	185.179	298.017
41	32	T. J. Bell	FAS Lane Racing	Ford	29.366	183.886	295.936
42	51	Kurt Busch	Phoenix Racing	Chevrolet	No Time^{1}		
43	87	Joe Nemechek	NEMCO Motorsports	Toyota	29.066	185.784	298.990
Failed to Qualify
	19	Mike Bliss	Humphrey Smith Racing	Toyota	29.103	185.548	298.611
	73	David Reutimann	BK Racing	Toyota	29.136	185.338	298.273
	49	J. J. Yeley	Robinson-Blakeney Racing	Toyota	29.391	183.730	295.685
	23	Scott Riggs	R3 Motorsports	Chevrolet	29.407	183.630	295.524
^{1}: After crashing during his qualifying lap, Kurt Busch started the race in 42nd by owner's point standings. Source:

=== Race results ===
Pos	No.	Driver	Team	Manufacturer	Laps	Points
1	5	Kasey Kahne	Hendrick Motorsports	Chevrolet	400	48
2	11	Denny Hamlin	Joe Gibbs Racing	Toyota	400	44
3	18	Kyle Busch	Joe Gibbs Racing	Toyota	400	43
4	16	Greg Biffle	Roush Fenway Racing	Ford	400	44
5	2	Brad Keselowski	Penske Racing	Dodge	400	41
6	88	Dale Earnhardt Jr.	Hendrick Motorsports	Chevrolet	400	38
7	24	Jeff Gordon	Hendrick Motorsports	Chevrolet	400	39
8	29	Kevin Harvick	Richard Childress Racing	Chevrolet	400	38
9	99	Carl Edwards	Roush Fenway Racing	Ford	400	35
10	17	Matt Kenseth	Roush Fenway Racing	Ford	399	34
11	48	Jimmie Johnson	Hendrick Motorsports	Chevrolet	399	33
12	56	Martin Truex Jr.	Michael Waltrip Racing	Toyota	399	32
13	15	Clint Bowyer	Michael Waltrip Racing	Toyota	398	31
14	39	Ryan Newman	Stewart–Haas Racing	Chevrolet	398	30
15	27	Paul Menard	Richard Childress Racing	Chevrolet	398	29
16	43	Aric Almirola	Richard Petty Motorsports	Ford	398	30
17	78	Regan Smith	Furniture Row Racing	Chevrolet	398	27
18	83	Landon Cassill	BK Racing	Toyota	398	28
19	31	Jeff Burton	Richard Childress Racing	Chevrolet	398	25
20	42	Juan Pablo Montoya	Earnhardt Ganassi Racing	Chevrolet	398	24
21	1	Jamie McMurray	Earnhardt Ganassi Racing	Chevrolet	397	23
22	13	Casey Mears	Germain Racing	Ford	397	22
23	20	Joey Logano	Joe Gibbs Racing	Toyota	397	21
24	21	Trevor Bayne	Wood Brothers Racing	Ford	397	0
25	14	Tony Stewart	Stewart–Haas Racing	Chevrolet	397	19
26	38	David Gilliland	Front Row Motorsports	Ford	397	18
27	51	Kurt Busch	Phoenix Racing	Chevrolet	396	17
28	47	Bobby Labonte	JTG Daugherty Racing	Toyota	396	16
29	93	Travis Kvapil	BK Racing	Toyota	395	15
30	10	Danica Patrick	Tommy Baldwin Racing	Chevrolet	395	0
31	32	T. J. Bell	FAS Lane Racing	Ford	390	0
32	9	Marcos Ambrose	Richard Petty Motorsports	Ford	367	14
33	22	A. J. Allmendinger	Penske Racing	Dodge	361	11
34	55	Mark Martin	Michael Waltrip Racing	Toyota	338	10
35	34	David Ragan	Front Row Motorsports	Ford	281	11
36	98	Michael McDowell	Phil Parsons Racing	Ford	228	8
37	95	Scott Speed	Leavine Family Racing	Ford	136	7
38	30	David Stremme	Inception Motorsports	Toyota	86	6
39	33	Stephen Leicht	Circle Sport Racing	Chevrolet	74	5
40	36	Dave Blaney	Tommy Baldwin Racing	Chevrolet	54	4
41	87	Joe Nemechek	NEMCO Motorsports	Toyota	47	0
42	74	Cole Whitt	Turn One Racing	Chevrolet	33	0
43	26	Josh Wise	Front Row Motorsports	Ford	15	1

== Standings after the race ==
Drivers' Championship standings

Pos	Driver	Points
1	Greg Biffle	453
2	Matt Kenseth	443
3	Denny Hamlin	437
4	Dale Earnhardt Jr.	435
5	Jimmie Johnson	405

Manufacturers' Championship standings

Pos	Manufacturer	Points
1	Chevrolet	81
2	Toyota	70
3	Ford	61
4	Dodge	52

- Note: Only the top five positions are included for the driver standings.

Previous race: 2012 Bojangles' Southern 500	Sprint Cup Series; 2012 season	Next race: 2012 FedEx 400
