= Bay Area Mountain Rescue Unit =

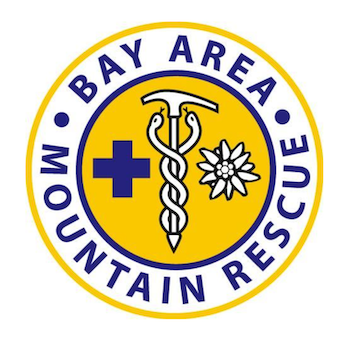
- Active: 1971 - Present
- Type: Mountain Rescue
- Size: 60 active members
- Part of: San Mateo County Sheriff's Office
- Garrison/HQ: (United States) Redwood City, CA
- Nickname: BAMRU
- Colors: Red
- Website: https://www.bamru.org/

The Bay Area Mountain Rescue Unit (BAMRU) is an all-volunteer, non-profit wilderness search and rescue team specializing in operations involving difficult terrain, challenging weather conditions and high altitude. BAMRU is affiliated with the San Mateo County Sheriff’s Office and operates throughout California.

== History ==
Founded in 1971, BAMRU is an independent, 501(c)(3) non-profit organization (Federal ID 23-7098709). It was one of the first search and rescue teams in the state of California to be accredited by the Mountain Rescue Association, gaining full membership status in 1972. The unit's origin was as a small group of primarily climbers. Currently the unit has varying outdoor skill sets, including mountaineering, skiing, and backpacking.

== Operations & Trainings ==
BAMRU is a part of the San Mateo County Sheriff’s Office, but can be activated for operations anywhere in California.

BAMRU trains in various locations, such as the Santa Cruz mountains, Yosemite, and throughout the Sierra mountains, to prepare for a range of conditions. Generally the unit runs at least one full-weekend training every month. As a Mountain Rescue Association team, BAMRU must undergo annual re-accreditation in the following disciplines: Technical Rock Rescue, Snow and Ice Rescue, and Wilderness Search Management. Some scheduled trainings can be attended by members of the public, after being sworn in by the San Mateo County Sheriff's Office and at the unit's discretion.
