= Marin County Sheriff's Office Search & Rescue =

Marin County Sheriff's Office Search & Rescue Mountain Rescue Team
- Marin County Sheriff's Office Search & Rescue Mountain Rescue Team logo
- Active: 1970 - Present
- Type: All volunteer, SAR, MRA unit
- Size: 100 active members
- Part of: Marin County Sheriff's Office
- Garrison/HQ: (United States) San Rafael, CA
- Nickname: Marin SAR
- Mottos: Anytime, Anywhere, Any Weather
- Colors: White and Green
- Website: Unit website

Commanders
- Unit Commander: Michael St. John
- Sheriff's Lt. Liaison: Pierre Ahuncain
- Support Directors: Wendy Dalia, Molly Williams, Rich Shelton

Marin County Search and Rescue is an all-volunteer organization in Marin County within Marin County Sheriff's Office. With approximately sixty active members, Marin County's Search and Rescue (Marin SAR) responds to searches for missing children and adults, evidence and other search requests in the county and on mutual aid calls anywhere in the state of California. Marin SAR is a mountain rescue Type I team with the motto of: "Anytime, Anywhere, Any Weather."

== History ==
Marin County Search and Rescue (Marin SAR) began as Explorer Post 74 in 1970, focusing on ecology and outdoor education. In 1971, the organization became the first scouting group in Marin to accept young women into the program. In the mid-1970s, several members attended a scouting conference in Washington state and learned about Explorer Search and Rescue. Marin Explorers returned and convinced the rest of the group to change the focus to search and rescue.

In 2004, Marin County's SAR team became Mountain Rescue Association (MRA) Type I certified—capable of handling the most challenging terrain at the highest elevations. In 2006, Marin SAR hosted the International Mountain Rescue Conference (IMRC), bringing search and rescue experts from all over to train together and share best practices in technical rescue. In 2010, Marin SAR was one of the coordinating host agencies for SAREX 2010 with responsibility for the coordination and management of the technical rope rescue track.

Today the team, headquartered in San Rafael, CA at 10S 054113 420581 UTM, trains and is equipped to respond to sustained wilderness and high altitude searches, missing children searches, mass casualty incidents or natural disasters as well as Urban Search and Rescue (US&R) with some members also members of regional US&R task force and swiftwater rescue. One of the few Search & Rescue teams to recruit and deploy youth members, on average Marin's SAR team has approximately 30 high-school age members and in a typical year deploys on 50+ missions throughout the State of California including Yosemite.

== Operations ==
Due to the diverse geography of Marin County, its proximity to major population centers, and natural tourist attractions, Marin County's SAR team operates closely with National Park Service (NPS) rangers, California State Park Rangers, Marin Watershed management, Marin County Open Space District as well as local law enforcement, fire, and civic organizations.

== Resources ==
Marin SAR fields six Search & Rescue vehicles including one SUV, a 4x4 van, a command vehicle and three emergency service vehicles. Additionally the team has two ATVs, a UTV and an IRB.

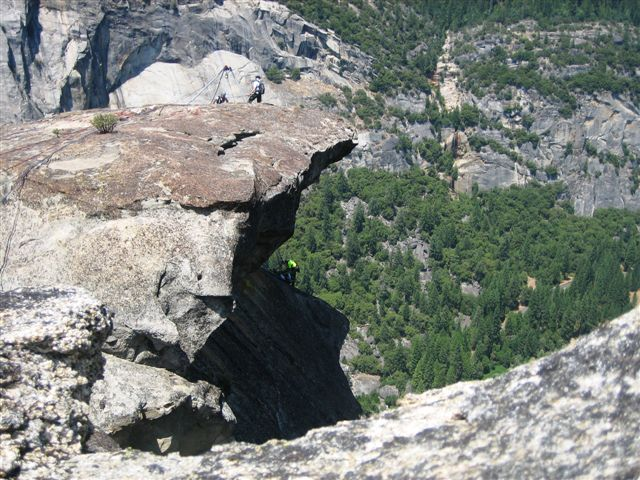
Practicing high-angle rescue in Yosemite.

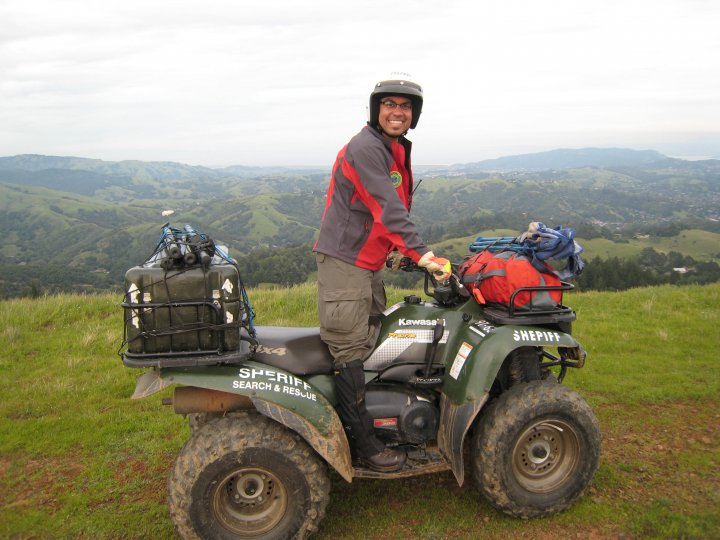
Patrolling on an ATV.

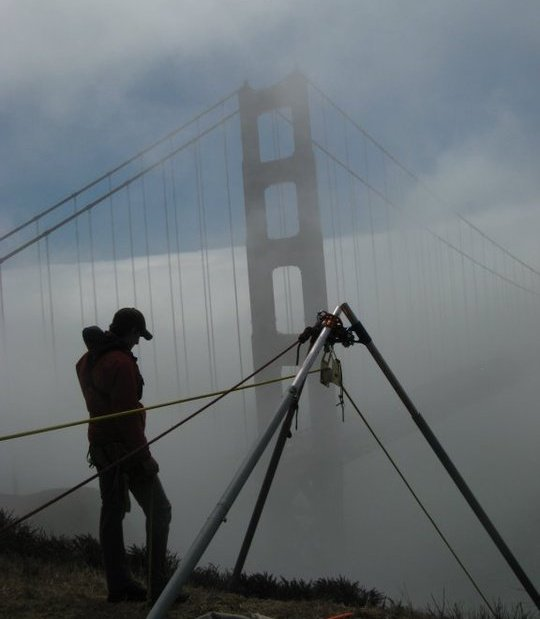
High-angle search in front of the Golden Gate Bridge.

High-angle training overlooking San Francisco Bay.

== See also ==
- California Region of the Mountain Rescue Association
- Mountain Rescue
- Mountain Rescue Association
- Search and Rescue
- Wilderness First Aid
- Wilderness First Responder (WFR)
- Wilderness Emergency Medical Technician (WEMT)
