= Arapahoe Rescue Patrol =

Voluntary search and rescue team in Arapahoe County, Colorado, United States

The Arapahoe Rescue Patrol (ARP) is a voluntary search and rescue team based in Arapahoe County, Colorado. Arapahoe Rescue Patrol has been entirely commanded and staffed by high school students since the formation of the team in 1957, with adults providing financial and administrative support.

== Role in the community ==
Primarily a search and rescue organization, the Arapahoe Rescue Patrol trains extensively in many areas of field emergency service including rock- and high-angle technical rescue, vertical forest/low-angle evacuation, winter and alpine operations, avalanche rescue, wilderness life support and emergency care, swift water rescue (at the technician level), and situation management functions. All members are on-call 24/7/365.

The team also supports local fire departments and law enforcement agencies by providing scene security details, perimeter control, traffic management, operational help (controlling hose lines, changing air bottles, etc.), evidence searching, and other non-hazardous services. Members frequently ride with Arapahoe County Sheriff's Office deputies, Littleton Police Department officers, and South Metro Fire Rescue personnel to assist with their daily operations. The Arapahoe Rescue Patrol is the designated light-duty rescue agency for the City of Littleton. All funding is provided by private donors. The Arapahoe Rescue Patrol is a non-profit 501 (c) (3) corporation and does not charge for its services.

== History ==
In the fall of 1957 an attempt was made to organize a search and rescue team in the Littleton area. Very few adults were interested or could afford the time needed to organize and operate such a unit. A group of students at Littleton Senior High School offered to form a team. Stan Bush, a counselor at the school, founded the team and was President of the Patrol until his death in 2007.

== Recognition ==
The Patrol received national recognition during the summer of 1964 when it received third prize in the Parents' Magazine Youth Group Achievement Award contest for Outstanding Service to the Community. It has received the La Sertoma Youth Service Award. The Patrol has received over 600 letters of commendation from victims, their families, and emergency agencies.

During the 1965 flood of the Platte River basin the Patrol received the Governor's Citation for two weeks of continuous flood work as well as a special citation from the Douglas County Civil Defense Agency. In 1976 the Patrol responded to assist with the Big Thompson Flood in Northern Colorado and received another Governor's Citation.

The Handbook of the Patrol is in use by groups in many states and foreign countries. Feature articles on the Patrol have appeared in publications such as "International Rescue and First Aid", "National Law and Order", "National Search and Rescue", "National Wildlife", and "Emergency".

In 1989 the Patrol was featured on the NBC Today show after a rock rescue in Roxborough Park, and on the CBS television show Rescue 911 after successfully rescuing two girls.
