= 2012 Bojangles' Southern 500 =

NASCAR race in Darlington, South Carolina, US

Race details
- Race 11 of 36 in the 2012 NASCAR Sprint Cup Series
- Date: May 12, 2012
- Location: Darlington Raceway, Darlington, South Carolina
- Course: Permanent racing facility
- Course length: 1.366 miles (2.198 km)
- Distance: 368 laps, 502.688 mi (808.998 km)
- Scheduled distance: 367 laps, 501.322 mi (806.800 km)
- Weather: Clear with a temperature around 82 °F (28 °C); wind out of the E at 5 mph (8.0 km/h).
- Average speed: 133.802 miles per hour (215.333 km/h)

Pole position
Driver	Greg Biffle	Roush Fenway Racing
- Time: 27.281

Most laps led
Driver	Jimmie Johnson	Hendrick Motorsports
- Laps: 134

Winner
No. 48	Jimmie Johnson	Hendrick Motorsports

Television in the United States
- Network: Fox
- Announcers: Mike Joy, Darrell Waltrip, Larry McReynolds
- Nielsen ratings: 3.8/7 (Final); 3.5/7 (Overnight); (5.716 million)

The 2012 Bojangles' Southern 500 was the 63rd running of the event, and the eleventh stock car race of the 2012 NASCAR Sprint Cup Series. It was held on May 12, 2012, at the Darlington Raceway in Darlington, South Carolina. The 368-lap race was won by Jimmie Johnson for the Hendrick Motorsports team. It was Johnson's first win of the season, and Hendrick Motorsport's 200th in NASCAR; Denny Hamlin of Joe Gibbs Racing finished second and Stewart–Haas Racing driver Tony Stewart took third.

Greg Biffle led the Drivers' Championship by seven points over his Roush Fenway Racing teammate Matt Kenseth in second. He won the pole position by posting the fastest lap in qualifying, and led the first 48 laps until the first round of green flag pit stops in which Kyle Busch emerged in the lead. Biffle retook the lead on the 73rd lap and again lost it after the second pit stop cycle. Johnson took the lead for the first time on lap 101, and led a total of 134 laps, more than any other competitor. At the final restart on lap 367 for a green–white–checkered finish, extending the race to 368 laps, Johnson led the field and maintained it to win the race. Hamlin finished second after passing Stewart who had problems with his car's fuel pressure. There were eight cautions and 22 lead changes among eight drivers during the race.

The result of the event advanced Johnson from eighth to fifth in the Drivers' Championship, 39 points behind Biffle, who led the standings going into the race, but his teammate Matt Kenseth reduced his lead to two points. Chevrolet maintained its lead in the Manufacturers' Championship, eight points ahead of Toyota in second place. Ford continued to hold the third position over Dodge in the battle for the place with 25 races left in the season. The race attracted 5.716 million television viewers.

== Background ==
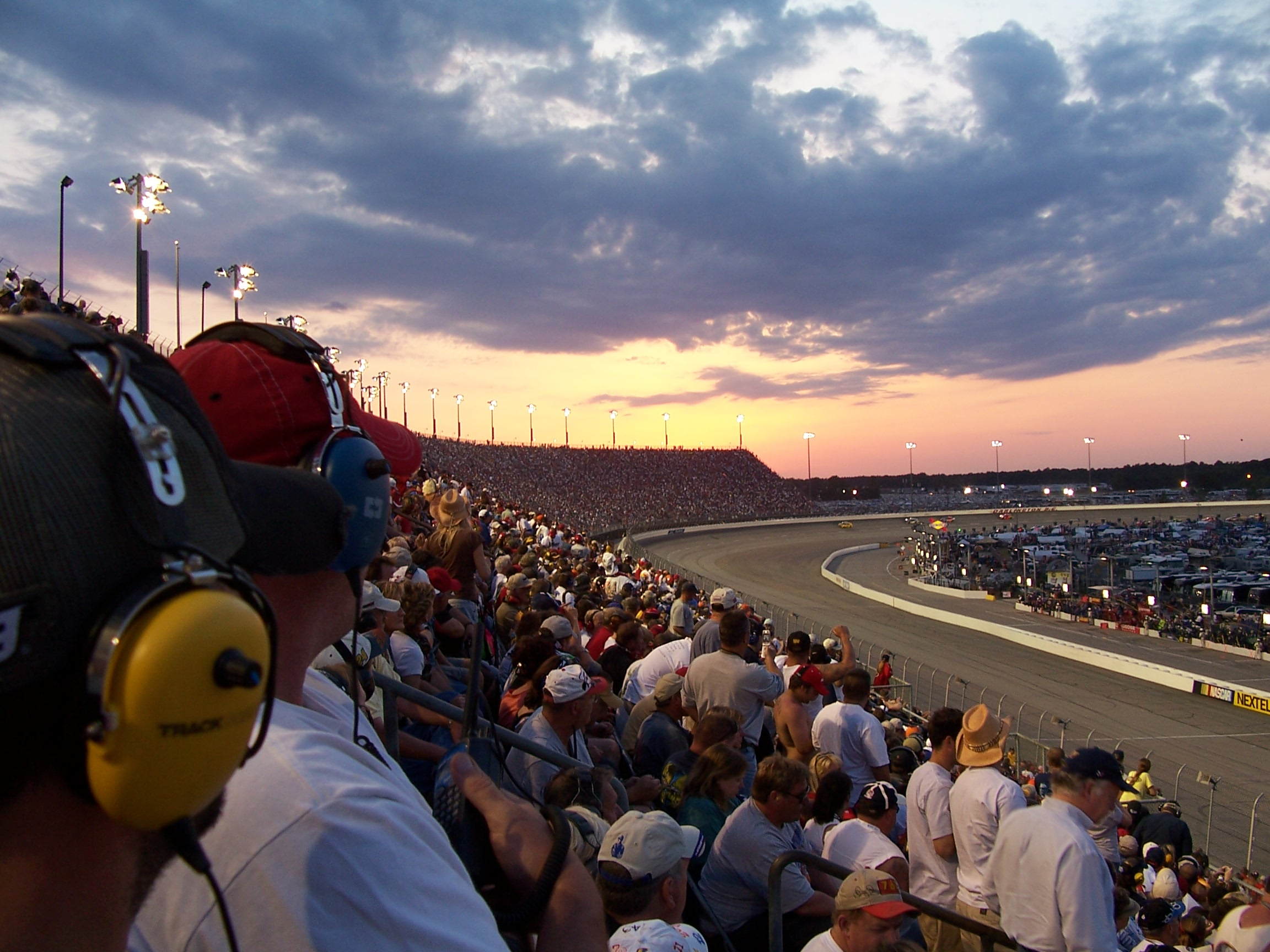
Darlington Raceway (pictured in 2008), where the race was held.

The 2012 Bojangles' Southern 500 was the eleventh stock car race out of thirty-six of the 2012 NASCAR Sprint Cup Series. It was scheduled to run for 367 laps over a distance of 501 mi (806 km), and was held on May 12, in Darlington, South Carolina, at Darlington Raceway, an intermediate oval track which began hosting NASCAR races in the 1950 Grand National Series; The standard track is a paved egg-shaped four-turn 1.366 mi (2.198 km) oval superspeedway. Its first two turns are banked at 25 degrees, while the final two turns are banked two degrees lower at 23 degrees. The front stretch (the location of the finish line) and the back stretch are banked at three and two degrees, respectively.

Before the race, Greg Biffle led the Drivers' Championship with 378 points, and Matt Kenseth stood in second with 371. Dale Earnhardt Jr. was third with 369 points, 18 in front of Denny Hamlin and 36 ahead of Kevin Harvick in fourth and fifth. Martin Truex Jr. with 332 points was four points ahead of Tony Stewart, as Jimmie Johnson with 324 points, was 16 points ahead of Kyle Busch, and 22 in front of Clint Bowyer. Carl Edwards and Brad Keselowski completed the top twelve drivers. In the Manufacturers' Championship, Chevrolet was leading with 63 points, five ahead of Toyota. Ford, with 53 points, was seven points ahead of Dodge in the battle for third. Regan Smith was the race's defending champion after winning it in 2011.

The start time of the race was moved from 7:30 pm local time to 7:00 pm following a successful request made by Darlingon Raceway president Chris Browning to NASCAR to accommodate fan surveys asking for the race to end at approximately 11:00 pm. There was one driver change going into the race. BK Racing announced that driver Travis Kvapil would compete in its No. 73 car starting from the Darlington event. Kvapil said in a media release that he was looking forward to working with the team, and his crew chief Ben Leslie at the track, "The guys at the shop are working really hard to prepare the car and get everything ready for this weekend. We're proud of what we've accomplished so far and hope that this race is another step in our growth."

== Practice and qualifying ==
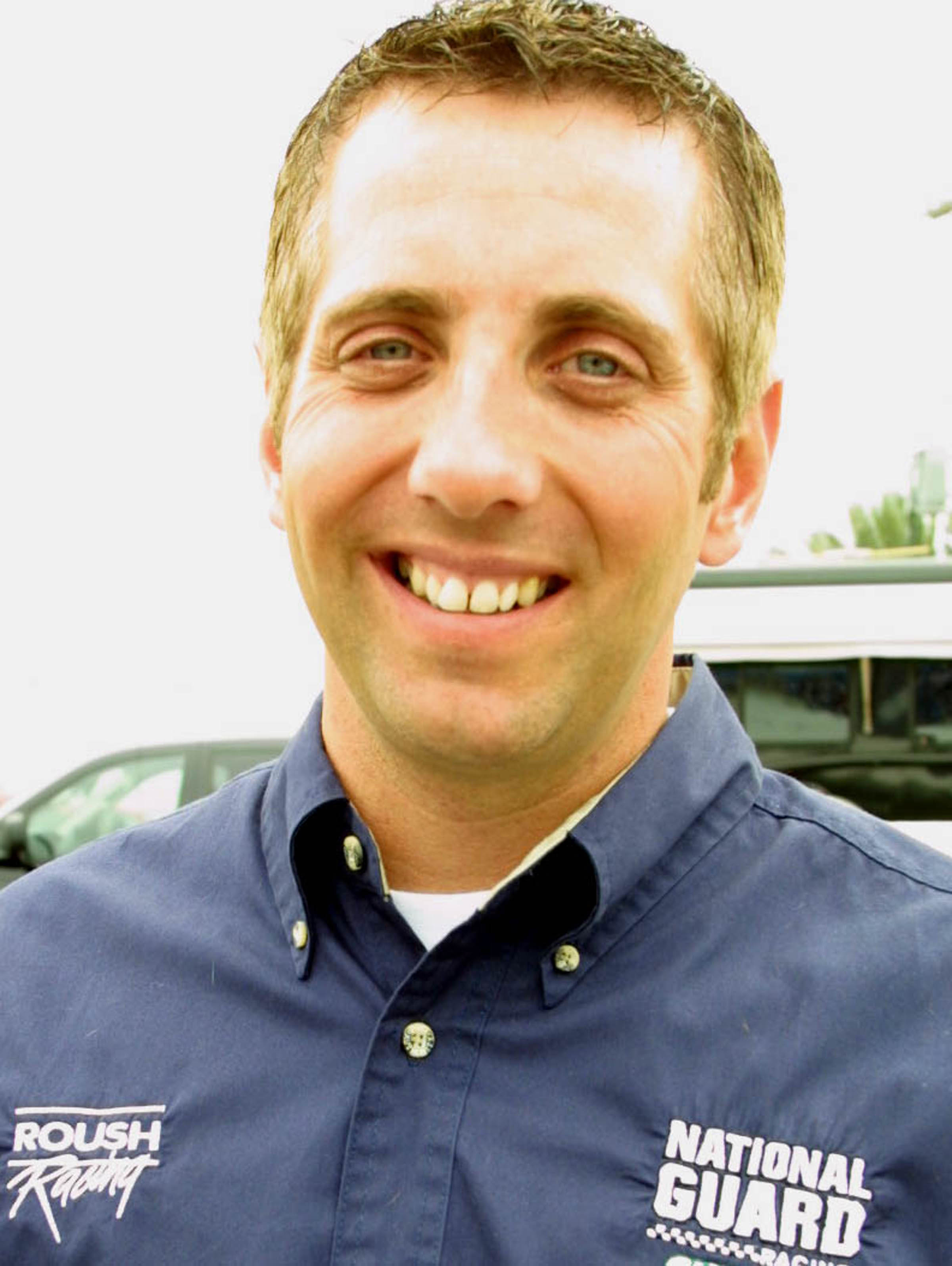
Greg Biffle (pictured in 2004) had the eleventh pole position of his career with a time of 27.281 seconds.

Two practice sessions were held on the Friday before the race. The first session lasted 120 minutes, and the second 45 minutes. In the first session, Harvick was quickest with a time of 27.769 seconds, around one-tenth of a second faster than Biffle. Kurt Busch was third, followed by Edwards, Stewart, Truex, Johnson, Ryan Newman, Joey Logano, and A. J. Allmendinger in positions four to ten. Aric Almirola spun 360 degrees leaving the fourth turn, but he avoided contact with the wall beside the track. In the second practice session, Allmendinger was fastest with a lap of 28.097 seconds. Biffle followed Allmendinger in the second position, with Edwards third quickest. Johnson, Travis Kvapil, Paul Menard, Landon Cassill, Josh Wise, Michael McDowell, and David Stremme rounded out the session's top ten fastest drivers.

There were forty-seven cars entered in the qualifying session on Friday evening, due to NASCAR's qualifying procedure, forty-three were allowed to race. Each driver ran two laps, with the starting order determined by the competitor's fastest times. Biffle clinched his second pole position of the season, his second at Darlington Raceway, and the eleventh of his career, with a time of 27.281 seconds, the only qualifying lap to go below 27.300 seconds. Johnson and his teammate Kahne qualified 0.105 seconds behind, but Johnson joined Biffle on the grid's front row because of a better Owner's Championship position compared to Kahne. Newman took fourth place, ahead of Kyle Busch and Truex in fifth and sixth. Edwards qualified in seventh place, while Hamlin followed in eighth. Smith and Jeff Burton completed the first ten starting positions. The four drivers who failed to qualify were Scott Riggs, McDowell, Stephen Leicht, and Mike Bliss.

Once the qualifying session concluded, Drivers' Championship leader Biffle stated, "This is what a race car driver looks forward to, showing up every weekend and having a really fast car to drive. They're making me look good so far." Afterward, he described his qualifying lap as "pretty uneventful", adding, "The car just had a ton of grip — it stuck to the race track really, really well. I felt like I was a little bit light down in Turns 1 and 2 — I should have been a little bit quicker down there — but I got a lot out of it in 3 and 4, so it was a great lap."

=== Qualifying results ===
Grid	No.	Driver	Team	Manufacturer	Time (s)	Speed
1	16	Greg Biffle	Roush Fenway Racing	Ford	27.281	180.257 mph (290.096 km/h)
2	48	Jimmie Johnson	Hendrick Motorsports	Chevrolet	27.386	179.566 mph (288.983 km/h)
3	5	Kasey Kahne	Hendrick Motorsports	Chevrolet	27.386	179.566 mph (288.983 km/h)
4	39	Ryan Newman	Stewart–Haas Racing	Chevrolet	27.402	179.461 mph (288.814 km/h)
5	18	Kyle Busch	Joe Gibbs Racing	Toyota	27.404	179.448 mph (288.794 km/h)
6	56	Martin Truex Jr.	Michael Waltrip Racing	Toyota	27.424	179.317 mph (288.583 km/h)
7	99	Carl Edwards	Roush Fenway Racing	Ford	27.427	179.298 mph (288.552 km/h)
8	11	Denny Hamlin	Joe Gibbs Racing	Toyota	27.444	179.187 mph (288.374 km/h)
9	78	Regan Smith	Furniture Row Racing	Chevrolet	27.451	179.141 mph (288.299 km/h)
10	31	Jeff Burton	Richard Childress Racing	Chevrolet	27.458	179.095 mph (288.225 km/h)
11	1	Jamie McMurray	Earnhardt Ganassi Racing	Chevrolet	27.459	179.089 mph (288.216 km/h)
12	24	Jeff Gordon	Hendrick Motorsports	Chevrolet	27.461	179.076 mph (288.195 km/h)
13	43	Aric Almirola	Richard Petty Motorsports	Ford	27.474	178.991 mph (288.058 km/h)
14	27	Paul Menard	Richard Childress Racing	Chevrolet	27.484	178.926 mph (287.953 km/h)
15	2	Brad Keselowski	Penske Racing	Dodge	27.500	178.822 mph (287.786 km/h)
16	22	A. J. Allmendinger	Penske Racing	Dodge	27.506	178.783 mph (287.723 km/h)
17	14	Tony Stewart	Stewart–Haas Racing	Chevrolet	27.515	178.724 mph (287.628 km/h)
18	55	Mark Martin	Michael Waltrip Racing	Toyota	27.551	178.491 mph (287.253 km/h)
19	17	Matt Kenseth	Roush Fenway Racing	Ford	27.592	178.226 mph (286.827 km/h)
20	83	Landon Cassill	BK Racing	Toyota	27.613	178.090 mph (286.608 km/h)
21	20	Joey Logano	Joe Gibbs Racing	Toyota	27.630	177.980 mph (286.431 km/h)
22	47	Bobby Labonte	JTG Daugherty Racing	Toyota	27.631	177.974 mph (286.421 km/h)
23	29	Kevin Harvick	Richard Childress Racing	Chevrolet	27.635	177.948 mph (286.380 km/h)
24	88	Dale Earnhardt Jr.	Hendrick Motorsports	Chevrolet	27.642	177.903 mph (286.307 km/h)
25	51	Kurt Busch	Phoenix Racing	Chevrolet	27.651	177.845 mph (286.214 km/h)
26	15	Clint Bowyer	Michael Waltrip Racing	Toyota	27.661	177.781 mph (286.111 km/h)
27	42	Juan Pablo Montoya	Earnhardt Ganassi Racing	Chevrolet	27.735	177.307 mph (285.348 km/h)
28	9	Marcos Ambrose	Richard Petty Motorsports	Ford	27.794	176.930 mph (284.741 km/h)
29	79	Scott Speed	Go Green Racing	Ford	27.802	176.879 mph (284.659 km/h)
30	26	Josh Wise	Front Row Motorsports	Ford	27.823	176.746 mph (284.445 km/h)
31	13	Casey Mears	Germain Racing	Ford	27.825	176.733 mph (284.424 km/h)
32	30	David Stremme	Inception Motorsports	Toyota	27.845	176.606 mph (284.220 km/h)
33	73	Travis Kvapil	BK Racing	Toyota	27.847	176.594 mph (284.200 km/h)
34	36	Dave Blaney	Tommy Baldwin Racing	Chevrolet	27.857	176.530 mph (284.097 km/h)
35	52	Mike Skinner	Hamilton Means Racing	Toyota	27.957	175.899 mph (283.082 km/h)
36	38	David Gilliland	Front Row Motorsports	Ford	27.978	175.767 mph (282.870 km/h)
37	34	David Ragan	Front Row Motorsports	Ford	28.004	175.604 mph (282.607 km/h)
38	10	Danica Patrick	Tommy Baldwin Racing	Chevrolet	28.021	175.497 mph (282.435 km/h)
39	74	Cole Whitt	Turn One Racing	Chevrolet	28.021	175.497 mph (282.435 km/h)
40	87	Joe Nemechek	NEMCO Motorsports	Toyota	28.097	175.022 mph (281.671 km/h)
41	93	David Reutimann	BK Racing	Toyota	28.196	174.408 mph (280.682 km/h)
42	32	Reed Sorenson	FAS Lane Racing	Ford	28.307	173.724 mph (279.582 km/h)
43	49	J. J. Yeley	Robinson-Blakeney Racing	Toyota	28.125	174.848 mph (281.391 km/h)
Failed to Qualify
	23	Scott Riggs	R3 Motorsports	Chevrolet	28.129	174.823 mph (281.350 km/h)
	98	Michael McDowell	Phil Parsons Racing	Ford	28.144	174.730 mph (281.201 km/h)
	33	Stephen Leicht	Joe Falk	Chevrolet	28.155	174.662 mph (281.091 km/h)
	19	Mike Bliss	Humphrey Smith Racing	Toyota	28.157	174.649 mph (281.070 km/h)

== Race ==
Live television coverage of the race began at 6:30 p.m. Eastern Daylight Time (UTC−04:00) in the United States on Fox. Commentary was provided by Mike Joy, with analysis given by retired driver Darrell Waltrip and former crew chief Larry McReynolds. Around the start of the race, weather conditions were cloudy but dry, with the air temperature projected to reach the upper 70 °F (21 °C)s range, and fall to the 60 °F (16 °C)s range once darkness fell. Mark Jones, pastor of First Baptist Church of Darlington, began pre-race ceremonies with an invocation. Singer-songwriter Casey Weston, one of eight finalists of season 1 of The Voice, performed the national anthem, and the mothers of the drivers commanded them to start their engines. No driver moved to the rear of the field during the pace laps.

The race commenced at 7:18 local time. Biffle maintained his lead on the first lap. Allmendinger moved into 13th by the start of lap two. By the fifth lap, Biffle held a lead of half a second over Johnson in the second position. On the tenth lap, Kyle Busch overtook Newman to move into fifth place. Three laps later, Newman fell to seventh after Truex and Edwards passed him. Hamlin was running in the seventh position by lap 25. 17 laps later, Jeff Gordon made heavy contact with the wall, but he continued with some damage to the right-hand side of his vehicle. One lap later, Johnson got ahead of Biffle for the lead temporarily, but he did not hold it at the start/finish line. As the front of the pack got tighter in slower traffic, Kahne passed his teammate Johnson to move into second on lap 47. Green flag pit stops began on the same lap, and Biffle made his pit stop on the next lap, handing the lead to Kahne. Johnson and then Cassill each led a lap as they staggered their pit stops between the 50th and 51st laps.

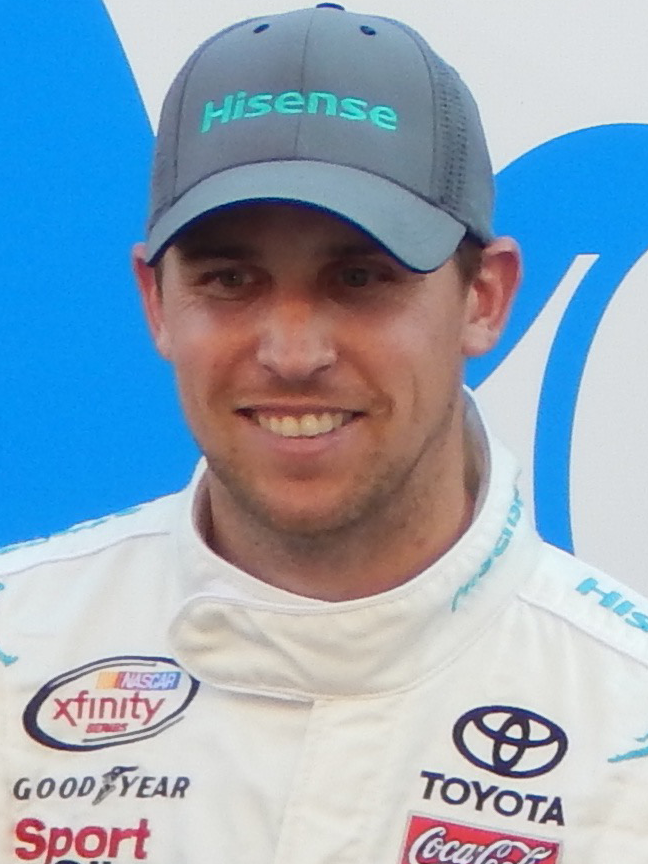
Denny Hamlin (pictured in 2015) finished in second place after leading a total of 54 laps

After the pit stops, Kyle Busch took over the lead, with Biffle in second, and Kahne third. Although Biffle closed on Kyle Busch, the latter responded to increase his lead to more than half a second by the 59th lap. Five laps later, Johnson caught and overtook Kahne on the inside lane for third place. Keselowski lost ninth to Johnson on lap 66. Biffle took the lead from Kyle Busch seven laps later, as Johnson then passed the latter for second. On the 76th lap, Kurt Busch overtook Keselowski for tenth place. Eight laps later, Kahne fell behind Truex who passed him for fourth place. Hamlin overtook Kahne for the fifth position on lap 89. In the meantime, Biffle's lead over Johnson grew to nearly a second. Stewart was passed by Kenseth for the ninth position on the 95th lap. The second round of green flag pit stops began three laps later. On the 99th lap, Biffle made his second pit stop, and Hamlin led the lap, until Gordon took the lead for lap 101. Johnson took over the first position after all the pit stops had been completed.

By the 105th lap, Johnson led by four seconds over Biffle in second. Seven laps later, Kahne was overtaken by Edwards for sixth place. Kurt Busch passed Stewart to move into tenth place on lap 116. Ten laps later, Kyle Busch got ahead of Biffle for the second position. Edwards caught Hamlin and got ahead of him to progress into fifth on lap 128. Biffle dropped to third when Truex overtook him eight laps later. On lap 140, Marcos Ambrose spun luridly, but he regained control of his car to avoid bringing out a caution. The third round of green flag pit stops commenced on lap 144. Biffle was the first driver to enter pit road on that lap. Johnson led the next four laps before making his own stop. After the pit stops, Johnson maintained the lead, with Kyle Busch second, and Biffle third. On the 154th lap, Kurt Busch passed Logano for the tenth position. Eleven laps later, Truex got ahead of Biffle for third in slower traffic.

On lap 172, Kyle Busch's lead of 5.4 seconds was reduced to nothing with the waving of the first caution of the race for debris in turn two. The leaders including Kyle Busch made pit stops for car adjustments. Johnson gained the first position for the lap 179 restart with Kyle Busch second. On the following lap, Kyle Busch retook the lead from Johnson on the outside line. Stewart passed Hamlin for tenth place on the 183rd lap. Three laps later, Edwards lost fourth to his teammate Biffle. Johnson caught and passed Kyle Busch to regain the lead on lap 189. Biffle overtook Truex for third on lap 190. A second caution came out four laps later as Gordon's left-rear tire went flat, and littered debris on the track. During the caution, the leaders including Johnson elected to make pit stops for tires. Hamlin led at the lap 199 restart, followed by Kahne. On the next lap, Kahne passed Hamlin around the outside to move into the lead. Kurt Busch was overtaken by Stewart for fourth on the 207th lap. Edwards slid sideways and was passed by Johnson for eighth three laps later. On lap 211, Biffle overtook Kurt Busch for fifth.

Logano got ahead of Edwards to progress into the ninth position on lap 215. Kyle Busch was overtaken by Johnson who moved into seventh on the following lap. On the 217th lap, Edwards fell outside the top ten when Harvick passed him. Four laps later, Gordon had another flat left rear tire and he drove to the garage. The third caution was necessitated when series officials located debris in the third turn on lap 230. The field including Kahne chose to make pit stops under the caution, as Hamlin took the lead for the lap 235 restart. Biffle made an error, and it allowed Truex to overtake him for third on lap 236, and Kyle Busch got past him on the next lap. On the 244th lap, Johnson passed Biffle to claim fifth place, and then overtook Stewart for fourth three laps later. On lap 250, Harvick overtook Bowyer for ninth. On lap 258, Logano got past Biffle for sixth. Bowyer lost another position as Edwards passed him one lap later. The fourth round of green flag pit stops commenced on lap 278. After the pit stops, Truex took the first position after Hamlin was delayed in his pit stall by Bobby Labonte.

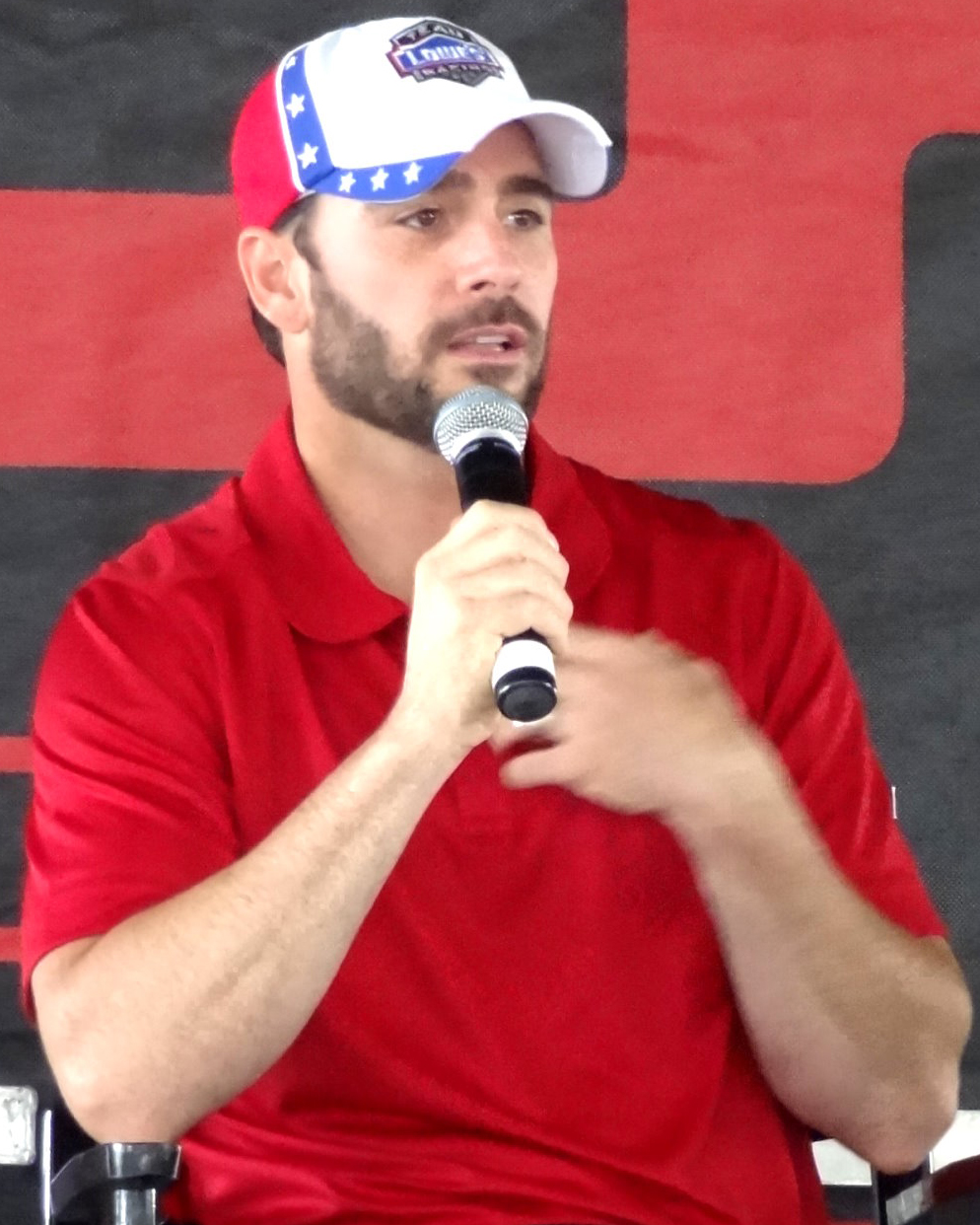
Jimmie Johnson (pictured in 2012) led a race-high 134 laps to secure his 56th career victory and the 200th win for Hendrick Motorsports in NASCAR.

Johnson overtook Kyle Busch for the third position on lap 291. Seven laps later, Truex's lead of eight-tenths of a second was reduced to nothing with the waving of the fourth caution, when Labonte after turn four. During the caution, several cars made pit stops for tires and car adjustments. Truex maintained his lead at the lap 303 restart, with Kyle Busch second and Johnson third. Johnson passed Kyle Busch for second place on the 304th lap, as Logano fell to seventh behind Hamlin, Kahne and Newman to around the same time. Three laps later, Smith spun in turn four, prompting the fifth caution. Several drivers (including Truex) went to pit road for fuel. Johnson switched his car on and off in order to conserve fuel upon the orders of his crew chief Chad Knaus, and led at the lap 311 restart. He held it for one lap as Kyle Busch passed him on the 312th lap. On the next lap, Johnson attempted a crossover maneuver on Kyle Busch, but he did not retake the lead. On lap 316, the sixth caution was shown, as Jamie McMurray and Allmendinger crashed in turn four. During the caution, several cars went to pit road. Kyle Busch used the outside lane to hold the lead at the restart on lap 319. Johnson passed Kyle Busch for the lead on lap 325. Six laps later, Reed Sorenson spun sideways leaving the fourth turn, triggering the seventh caution.

Johnson led the field back to racing speed on the lap 334 restart. Stewart got into second by running on the outside lane by the following lap. Truex lost sixth place to Biffle on lap 336. 13 laps later, Edwards got ahead of Kahne to advance into seventh. As Johnson increased his lead over Stewart to almost a second by going half a mile faster than him, Kurt Busch hit the wall after his tire went flat on lap 361, and was sent into Newman's path, prompting the eighth (and final) caution. The race restarted on lap 367 for a green–white–checkered finish extending the race to 368 laps, with Johnson leading Stewart in second and Hamlin third. Johnson achieved a fast getaway, and Hamlin overtook Stewart (who had fuel pressure problems) around the outside for second place. Johnson held the lead to clinch his first victory of the season, his third at Darlingon Raceway, and the 56th of his career. It was the 200th victory for Hendrick Motorsports in NASCAR Cup Series competition since Geoff Bodine won the 1984 Sovran Bank 400. Hamlin finished second, Stewart third, Kyle Busch fourth and Truex fifth. Kenseth, Edwards, Kahne, Ambrose, and Logano rounded out the top ten finishers. There were 22 lead changes among eight different drivers during the course of the race. Johnson's 134 laps led was the most of any competitor.

=== Post-race ===
"I can't believe we won 200, I can't believe it took this long after 199. I am kind of numb, but I am glad it is over. I think we are going to win a few more now."

— Hendrick Motorsports owner and founder Rick Hendrick on Johnson taking his team's 200th victory.

Johnson appeared in Victory Lane to celebrate Hendrick Motorsports' 200th NASCAR victory in front of the crowd of 63,000 people; the win earned him $319,786. He said of the achievement, "He just said 200 wins is great; let's go get 250, What a day. We had a tremendous race car and won the race. There really was a lot of drama. In a fuel mileage race I was really concerned and hoped I had saved enough fuel but there were a lot of hungry drivers out there. This race is so special; so great. Darlington is a great race track." Hendrick Motorsports had logged their 199th win seven months and sixteen races beforehand.

Hamlin was uncertain as to whether an error at his final pit stop lost him the victory, "When our car was best, we could probably hang with him, Obviously, it looked like his car was very strong, was one of the best." Third-placed Stewart said he was happy to finish in the position and reserved praise for Hendrick Motorsports, "I was trying to postpone (No. 200) for another week by trying to get to Jimmie, but I just couldn't do it, The closer I got to him, the tighter I got. That was one of the best runs we'd had, but still I wasn't strong enough. He had plenty of car left. He was just riding, trying to save fuel. They won it in dominating fashion. To win a 200th race, you don't want to back into it. They dominated and took it the way they should."

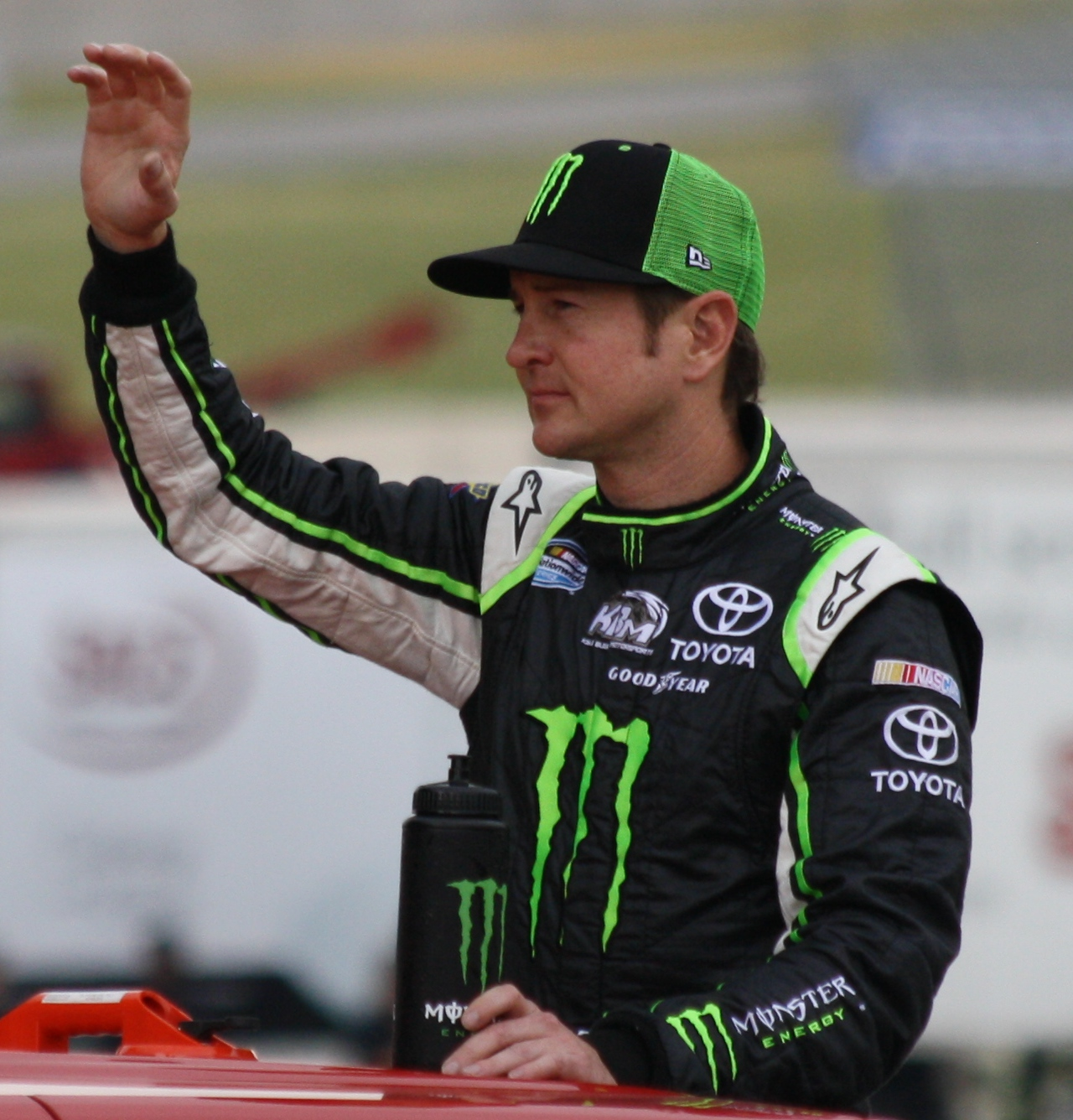
Kurt Busch was fined $50,000 and put on probation for a post-race crash with Ryan Newman on pit road.

After the race, Kurt Busch's crew chief Nick Harrison instructed him to stop at the entrance to pit road and exit his car. However, he elected to drive into the left rear quarter of Newman's car on pit road. Newman then got out of his car to speak with Kurt Busch. While doing that, Newman' gasman Andy Rueger, who was waiting at Kurt Busch's hauler because he planned to confront him about the accident, learnt Busch was on pit road, and he and his fellow crew members ran towards him. Rueger lunged at Kurt Busch but he knocked over a NASCAR official who fell backward on the hood of his car. This led to a brawl between the pit crews but Kurt Busch was escorted away to the NASCAR hauler during the struggle to explain himself. Newman, Rueger and the driver's crew chief Tony Gibson were also called to the hauler. NASCAR put the incident under investigation. Gibson said multiple crew members jumped aside to avoid Kurt Busch hitting them at Newman's final pit stop, and Harrison said that no person involved in the incident punched each other, "Just one of those deals when people get bunched up, someone fell down, A lot of mouthing. Just frustration getting took out. It's Cup racing at its best. If people didn't get mad and didn't care, they wouldn't come here."

Kurt Busch left the track without speaking to the press about the crash. Newman suspected Kurt Busch had a chemical imbalance that made him angry during the race, "I'm pretty sure there were 42 other guys that are taking their helmets off and doing whatever for the last 10 years, and that's the first time that's happened to me. Circumstances, I think, are he lied and was so frustrated that he doesn't know how to deal with his anger." Two days later, NASCAR announced penalties for Phoenix Racing. The penalties, for "actions detrimental to stock-car racing", for hitting Newman's car on pit road, and getting into an altercation, included a $50,000 fine for Kurt Busch, and he was placed on probation until July 25, 2012. Additionally, a crew member of Kurt Busch's team, Craig Stickler, was fined $5,000, and placed on probation until December 31, 2012, for "interfering with a member of the broadcast media". Gibson was put on probation until June 27, 2012, because he was deemed responsible for his team members' actions. Rueger was fined $5,000, and was also placed on probation until June 27, 2012, for failing to comply with a NASCAR official's post-race directive.

The result of the race meant Biffle remained the Drivers' Championship leader with 411 points. Kenseth lowered his teammate's lead to two points and Earnhardt and Hamlin maintained the third and fourth positions. Johnson's victory advanced him from eighth to fifth. Truex and Stewart remained in sixth and seventh, while Harvick fell from fifth to eighth. Kyle Busch, Edwards, Bowyer, and Keselowski rounded out the top twelve. In the Manufacturers' Championship, Chevrolet extended their lead over Toyota to eight points. Ford stayed in front of Dodge in the battle for third place. The race attracted 5.716 million television viewers; it took three hours, 45 minutes, and 25 seconds to complete, and the margin of victory was 0.781 seconds.

=== Race results ===
Pos	No.	Driver	Team	Manufacturer	Laps	Points
1	48	Jimmie Johnson	Hendrick Motorsports	Chevrolet	368	48^{2}^{3}
2	11	Denny Hamlin	Joe Gibbs Racing	Toyota	368	43^{1}
3	14	Tony Stewart	Stewart–Haas Racing	Chevrolet	368	41
4	18	Kyle Busch	Joe Gibbs Racing	Toyota	368	41^{1}
5	56	Martin Truex Jr.	Michael Waltrip Racing	Toyota	368	40^{1}
6	17	Matt Kenseth	Roush Fenway Racing	Ford	368	38
7	99	Carl Edwards	Roush Fenway Racing	Ford	368	37
8	5	Kasey Kahne	Hendrick Motorsports	Chevrolet	368	37^{1}
9	9	Marcos Ambrose	Richard Petty Motorsports	Ford	368	35
10	20	Joey Logano	Joe Gibbs Racing	Toyota	368	34
11	15	Clint Bowyer	Michael Waltrip Racing	Toyota	368	33
12	16	Greg Biffle	Roush Fenway Racing	Ford	368	33^{1}
13	27	Paul Menard	Richard Childress Racing	Chevrolet	368	31
14	78	Regan Smith	Furniture Row Racing	Chevrolet	368	30
15	2	Brad Keselowski	Penske Racing	Dodge	368	29
16	29	Kevin Harvick	Richard Childress Racing	Chevrolet	368	28
17	88	Dale Earnhardt Jr.	Hendrick Motorsports	Chevrolet	368	28^{1}
18	31	Jeff Burton	Richard Childress Racing	Chevrolet	368	26
19	43	Aric Almirola	Richard Petty Motorsports	Ford	368	25
20	55	Mark Martin	Michael Waltrip Racing	Toyota	368	24
21	51	Kurt Busch	Phoenix Racing	Chevrolet	368	23
22	13	Casey Mears	Germain Racing	Ford	367	22
23	39	Ryan Newman	Stewart–Haas Racing	Chevrolet	367	22
24	42	Juan Pablo Montoya	Earnhardt Ganassi Racing	Chevrolet	366	20
25	38	David Gilliland	Front Row Motorsports	Ford	366	19
26	83	Landon Cassill	BK Racing	Toyota	366	19^{1}
27	36	Dave Blaney	Tommy Baldwin Racing	Chevrolet	365	17
28	34	David Ragan	Front Row Motorsports	Ford	364	16
29	47	Bobby Labonte	JTG Daugherty Racing	Toyota	364	15
30	32	Reed Sorenson	FAS Lane Racing	Ford	363	0^{4}
31	10	Danica Patrick	Tommy Baldwin Racing	Chevrolet	362	0^{4}
32	73	Travis Kvapil	BK Racing	Toyota	362	PE^{4}
33	22	A. J. Allmendinger	Penske Racing	Dodge	357	11
34	1	Jamie McMurray	Earnhardt Ganassi Racing	Chevrolet	345	10
35	24	Jeff Gordon	Hendrick Motorsports	Chevrolet	339	9
36	93	David Reutimann	BK Racing	Toyota	314	8
37	49	J. J. Yeley	Robinson-Blakeney Racing	Toyota	132	7
38	74	Cole Whitt	Turn One Racing	Chevrolet	35	0^{4}
39	30	David Stremme	Inception Motorsports	Toyota	32	5
40	87	Joe Nemechek	NEMCO Motorsports	Toyota	27	0^{4}
41	52	Mike Skinner	Hamilton Means Racing	Toyota	20	0^{4}
42	79	Scott Speed	Go Green Racing	Ford	20	2
43	26	Josh Wise	Front Row Motorsports	Ford	19	1
^{1} Includes one bonus point for leading a lap^{2} Includes two bonus points for leading the most laps^{3} Includes three bonus points for winning the race^{4} Ineligible for championship points

== Standings after the race ==
Drivers' Championship standings

Pos	+/–	Driver	Points
1		Greg Biffle	411
2		Matt Kenseth	409 (−2)
3		Dale Earnhardt Jr.	397 (−14)
4		Denny Hamlin	394 (−17)
5	3	Jimmie Johnson	372 (−39)
6		Martin Truex Jr.	372 (−39)
7		Tony Stewart	369 (−42)
8	3	Kevin Harvick	361 (−50)
9		Kyle Busch	349 (−62)
10	1	Carl Edwards	337 (−74)
11	1	Clint Bowyer	335 (−76)
12		Brad Keselowski	328 (−83)

Manufacturers' Championship standings

+/–	Pos	Manufacturer	Points
1		Chevrolet	72
2		Toyota	64 (−8)
3		Ford	57 (−15)
4		Dodge	49 (−23)

- Note: Only the top five positions are included for the driver standings.

Previous race: 2012 Aaron's 499	Sprint Cup Series; 2012 season	Next race: 2012 Coca-Cola 600
