= Charlotte Fire Station No. 4 =

Historic fire station in North Carolina, US

- U.S. National Register of Historic Places
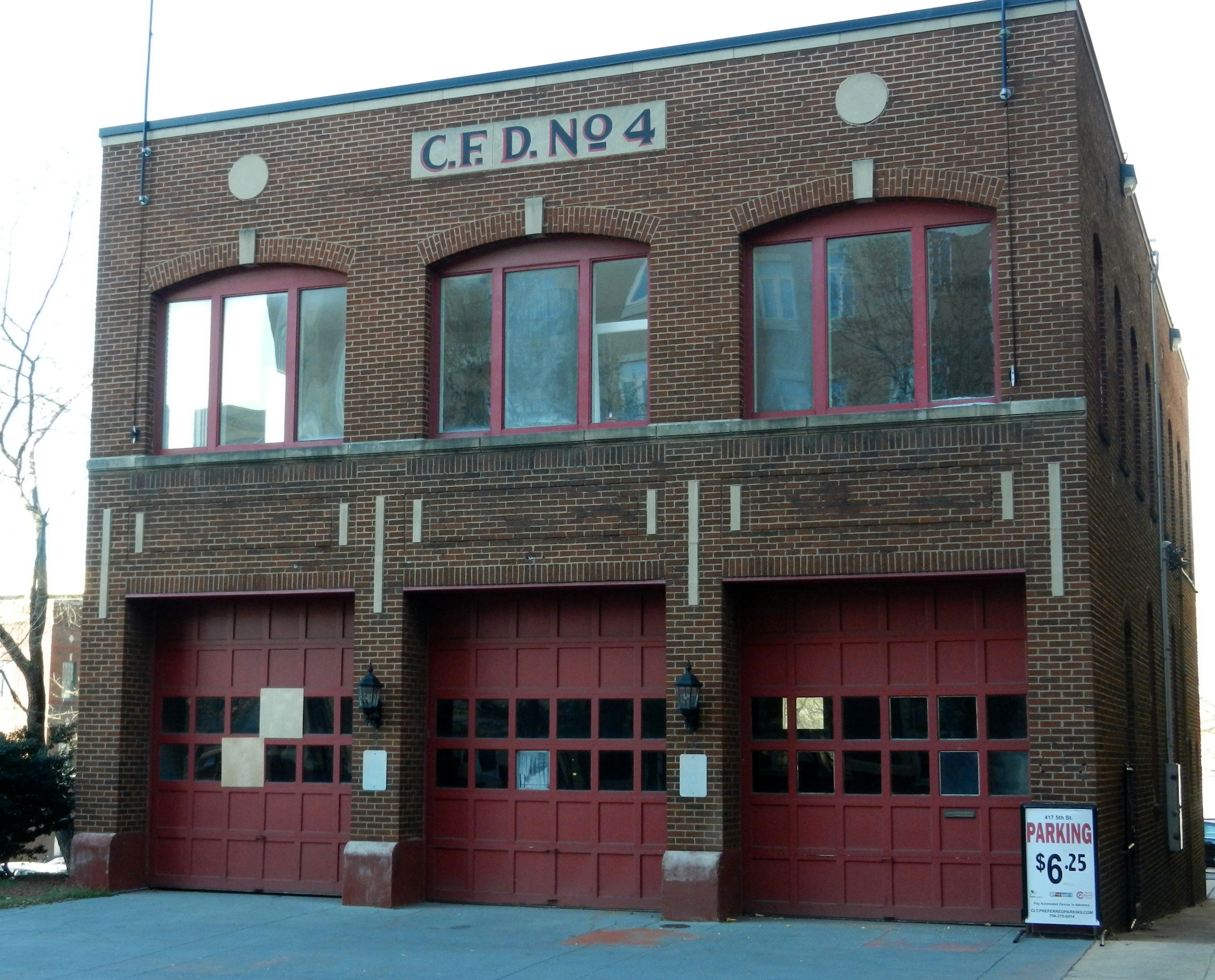
- Charlotte Fire Station No. 4 (March 3, 2017)

- Location within North Carolina Location within the United States
- Location: 420 W 5th St., Charlotte, North Carolina
- Coordinates: 35°13′52″N 80°50′54″W
- Area: 0.228 acres (0.092 ha)
- Built: 1926
- Architect: Charles Christian Hook
- NRHP reference No.: 16000879
- Added to NRHP: December 20, 2016

Charlotte Fire Station No. 4 is a historic fire station located at Charlotte, Mecklenburg County, North Carolina. It was listed on the National Register of Historic Places in 2016.

== History ==
In 1926, the fire station was designed by American architect Charles Christian Hook and built by J. A. Gardner. It occupies 0.228-acre lot near the northeast corner of the intersection of North Graham Street and West Fifth Street in downtown Charlotte, North Carolina. The station continued in its original use until 1972. It was replaced by a new fire station at 525 North Church Street.

== See also ==
- Fire Station No. 2 (Charlotte, North Carolina)
- National Register of Historic Places listings in Mecklenburg County, North Carolina
