= California Region of the Mountain Rescue Association =

The California Region of the Mountain Rescue Association (Also called CRMRA) consists of 24 accredited (regular) teams, 6 associate members, and 5 Exofficio throughout California and Nevada. The California Region is one of the nine regions within the Mountain Rescue Association (MRA), a national volunteer organization in the United States dedicated to saving lives through rescue and mountain safety education. California MRA teams respond to search and rescue operations in the unit's area of responsibility and to mutual aid calls anywhere in the state to assist other agencies.

== CRMRA Accreditation ==
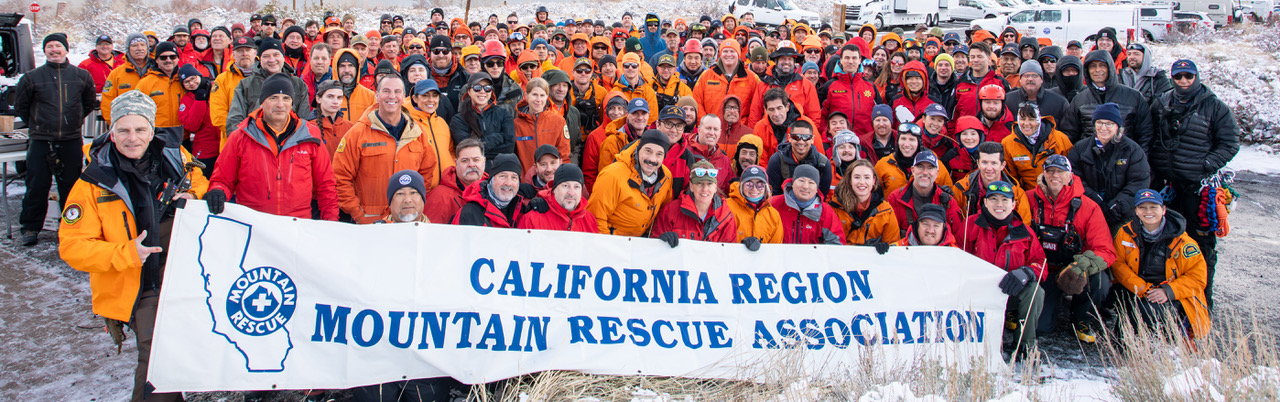
CRMRA Winter Recert Photo at Convict Lake 2024

Accredited teams must meet the high standards of the MRA and must be re-evaluated every three to five years in each of the three MRA skills. All CRMRA teams must first be sponsored by an existing accredited team and complete three separate accreditation tests in the following categories:

Search and Tracking: Members must form teams to track a person through wilderness terrain, treat and transport an injured person, and manage a low-level basecamp.
Technical Rock: members must move an injured person from complicated terrain (i.e. rock cliff or tallus pile) to a safe location for normal transport demonstrating safety for the rescuers concerning rock fall and system failures.
Snow and Ice: members must move an injured person from snow and ice conditions to a safe location for normal transport demonstrating safety for the rescuers concerning hypothermia and avalanche risks.

The tests are evaluated by long time members of the MRA from other CRMRA teams. New teams are eventually voted into the CRMRA based on their performance in these three main areas. New teams join as Associate Members and then go through the accreditation process over the next several years.

Once a team is part of the CRMRA they are expected to re-accredit once a year. Each year the test is hosted by one of the teams in the region and rotates between the three categories. During the yearly Re-Accreditation testing each team is evaluated by two senior members from other teams in the region in the six subject areas: Leadership, Operation Plan, Communication, Safety, Medical and Technical.

== CRMRA business ==
The CRMRA holds quarterly regional meetings throughout the state for CRMRA elected officials and representatives from teams in the region. Elected positions include:

- Chairman
- Vice Chairman
- Secretary/Treasurer

== See also ==
- Mountain Rescue in the United States
