= San Diego Mountain Rescue Team =

- Founded: 1968
- Founder: John Wehbring, Wes Reynolds and Will Tapp
- Type: Public Safety, Search and Rescue
- Location: San Diego County, California
- Origins: 1967 Picacho del Diablo rescue
- Region served: United States
- Method: Mountain Rescue, Rope Rescue, Avalanche Rescue
- Volunteers: 72
- Website: sdmrt.org

The San Diego Mountain Rescue Team (SDMRT) is a volunteer organization in San Diego County, California, operating under the jurisdiction of the San Diego County Sheriff's Office. With approximately 70 active members, SDMRT responds to calls at any time to search for and rescue missing, injured or stranded persons in San Diego County and, through mutual-aid requests, in other counties within the state of California.

SDMRT is a fully accredited member of the international Mountain Rescue Association as well as an accredited Type I Mountain Search and Rescue Team. It routinely works with the San Diego Sheriff's Office Search and Rescue Bureau and San Diego's Aerial Support to Regional Enforcement Agencies (ASTREA) on operations within the county. On operations outside of San Diego County, SDMRT works under the particular law enforcement agency for the region in question.

== Team history ==
In February 1967, two Claremont College students set out to climb the 10,154 foot tall Picacho del Diablo, the highest mountain in Baja California. They did not return to school and were reported missing. After a week-long search by Los Angeles-area mountain rescue teams the couple was found severely debilitated, near death, and were rescued from the upper canyons of the mountain. Individuals who participated in the Picacho del Diablo rescue were inspired to found the San Diego Mountain Rescue Team, and it was incorporated as a 501(c)(3) in 1968.

== Notable operations ==
- June 20, 2014 - Lost hiker returning from summit of Mt. Whitney.
- April 11, 2012 - Lost hiker in Anza-Borrego Desert State Park.
- July 7, 2011 - Lost teenager in Mission Valley.
- May 13, 2011 - Lost person in rural community.
- March 27, 2011 - Lost hiker on Santa Ysabel Mountain.
- October 2007 - October 2007 California wildfires searches and medical support
- October 2003 - Cedar Fire evacuations
- April 10, 1967 - First operation

== See also ==
- Mountain rescue
- Search and rescue
