= Urban Search and Rescue Maryland Task Force 1 =

One of 28 teams that form the FEMA National Urban Search and Rescue System

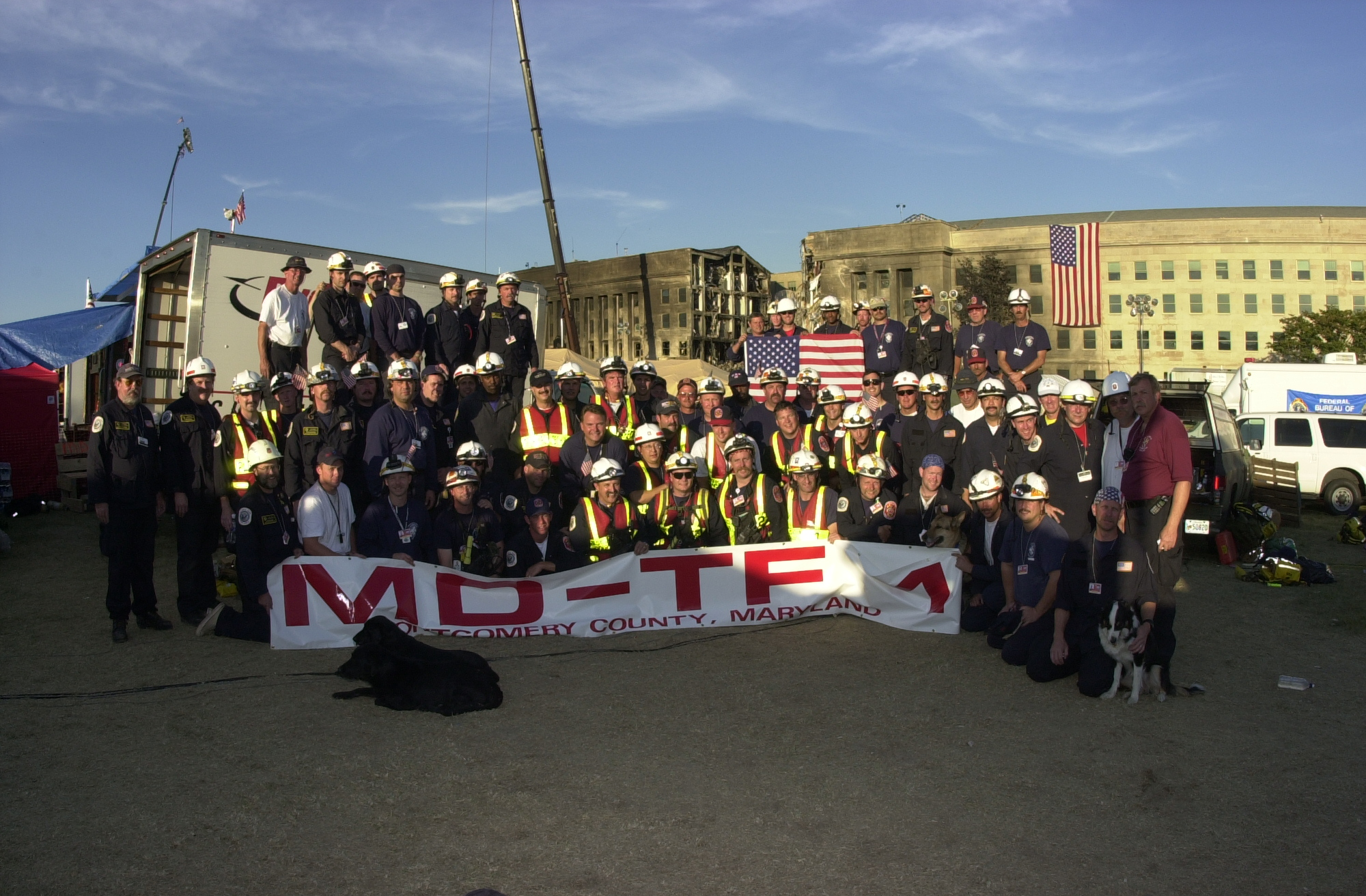
MD-TF1 at The Pentagon

Urban Search and Rescue Maryland Task Force 1 or MD-TF1 is a FEMA Urban Search and Rescue Task Force based in Montgomery County, Maryland. MD-TF1 is sponsored by Montgomery County Fire & Rescue Service.
