= NCCERT =

NC K9 ERT (North Carolina Canine Emergency Response Team) is a statewide volunteer organization providing search and rescue services to local, state and federal agencies. NC K9 ERT is based out of the Raleigh area of North Carolina.

== Location ==
NC K9 ERT Headquarters is located in Wendell, NC

== About ==
NC K9 ERT is a non-profit, 501(c)(3) corporation serving the State of North Carolina and surrounding areas. It specializes in finding missing persons.

Committed to the goal of providing highly skilled search and rescue teams 24 hours a day, NC K9 ERT responds to requests from law enforcement agencies and emergency management agencies, during natural or man made disasters, structure and building collapse, drownings, and lost persons in urban and wilderness settings, at no cost to the requesting agency.

Through the Apex Fire Department, the group is a part of the search division on North Carolina Task Force 4.

In addition, NC K9 ERT works to promote understanding and public awareness of the role of search dogs through public demonstrations and lectures to state and local agencies, schools, retirement and rest homes.

Trained in Disaster, Cadaver (water and land) and Wilderness searches, these teams undergo rigorous training and must meet strict standards before they are deployed on a mission. Ongoing training and continuing education is required for all members to maintain their skills at optimal levels.

Training in search and rescue and disaster response is conducted in diverse situations and often entails more than 50 hours per month for each member.

All members are responsible for providing their own personal equipment.

== Notable incident responses ==
NC K9 ERT responded to the Apex chemical fire in October 2006 and provided a vital communications role for that incident. The Apex Emergency Communications Center had to be evacuated because of toxic fumes that were approaching their building. The NC K9 ERT communications truck housed the dispatchers and they were able to provide communications to emergency responders without incident during the duration of the event.

== Functions ==
- Search & Rescue of lost or missing persons
- Major Disaster Response
- Request for Cadaver K9
- K9 live find searches
- Community Service Functions
- Emergency Radio Communications

== Services ==
NC K9 ERT services include:

- Side Scan Sonar Operations (Underwater Cadaver, weapons etc.)
- Wilderness search and rescue
- Cadaver search
