= Fire Station No. 2 (Charlotte, North Carolina) =

Historic building in North Carolina, US

- U.S. National Register of Historic Places
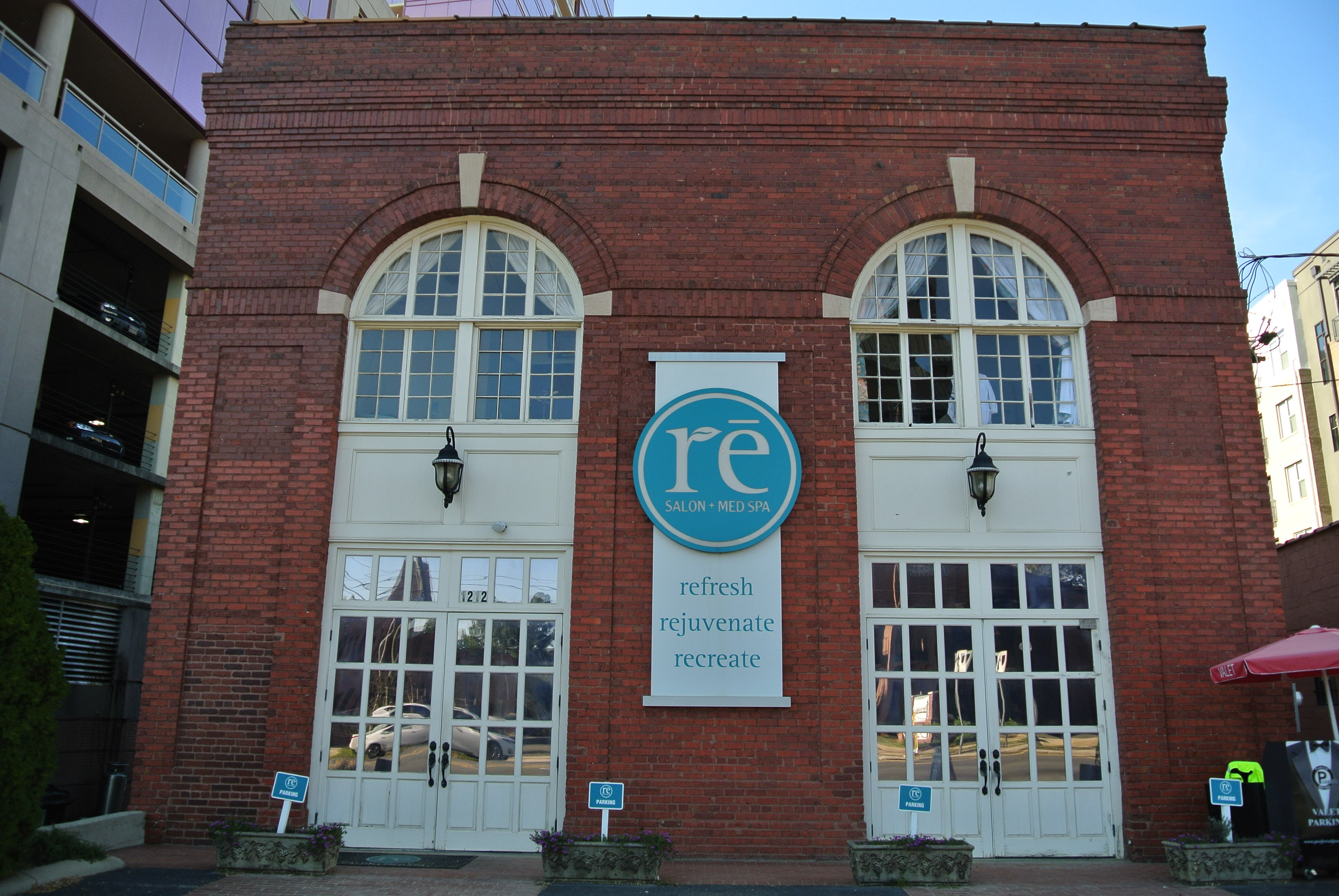
- Fire Station No. 2, October 2016

- Location within North Carolina Location within the United States
- Location: 1212 South Blvd., Charlotte, North Carolina
- Coordinates: 35°13′0″N 80°51′6″W
- Area: less than one acre
- Built: 1909
- Architect: Wheeler, Galliher & Stern; Jones, J.A.
- NRHP reference No.: 80002886
- Added to NRHP: October 22, 1980

Fire Station No. 2, also known as the Old Dilworth Fire Station, is a historic fire station located at Charlotte, Mecklenburg County, North Carolina. It built in 1909, and is a two-story red brick building with two equipment bays on the ground level and firefighters dormitory space upstairs. Since 2010, it has been used as a commercial building, hosting a spa.

It was listed on the National Register of Historic Places in 1980.

== See also ==
- Charlotte Fire Station No. 4
- National Register of Historic Places listings in Mecklenburg County, North Carolina
