= Sertoma International =

Organization of service clubs

- Formation: April 11, 1912; 114 years ago
- Type: Non-governmental organization
- Legal status: Service club
- Location: Kansas City, Missouri, U.S.
- Website: www.sertoma.org

Sertoma International, also known as Sertoma, Inc., is an organization of service clubs founded on April 11, 1912. The name is an acronym for Service to Mankind. Sertoma has clubs all over the United States and in Canada. Sertoma's primary focus is on assisting the more than 50 million people with hearing health issues and educating the public on the issues surrounding hearing health. In order to achieve these goals, Sertoma has undertaken a multi-faceted approach by launching programs that address both the treatment and prevention aspects of hearing health.

Sertoma has approximately 225 clubs throughout the U.S. and Canada with over 10,000 members combined. Clubs also sponsor community projects to promote non-partisan freedom and democracy, to assist youth, and to benefit a variety of other local community needs as identified by individual clubs. In 2010, Sertoma Clubs donated over $10 million to various community projects and sponsorships.

== History ==
=== The Co-Operative Club ===
The first official luncheon meeting of the founding Club was held on April 11, 1912, at the Coates House Hotel, then the fashionable hotel in Kansas City, Missouri. The founders of the first Co-Operative Club were George W. Smith, M.D., Charles E. Allen, M.D. and William R. Rowe. These three men are now recognized as the Founding Fathers of The Co-Operator Club of Kansas City, Missouri, and of Sertoma International.

In December 1920, Edward G. Freed, then President of the Kansas City Club, invited representatives from other clubs to meet together to consider forming an organization. Representatives from the Wichita, Manhattan, and Topeka Clubs, and the Kansas City Club attended. The International organization was immediately formed, and Freed was elected the first International President. On June 21, 1921, the first convention was held in Kansas City. Attending were 32 delegates representing six Clubs: Kansas City, Topeka, Manhattan, St. Louis, Chicago and Omaha. James P. "Daddy" Summerville, Charter President of the Kansas City, Missouri Club, was elected the second International President.

The Co-Operettes had its beginning in 1923 when the wives of the Members of the Co-Operative Club of Manhattan, Kansas, organized the first auxiliary, called the "Co-Op Lassies.” In 1928, the Co-Operettes became a national organization. Radio was used to promote the activities of the early Sertoma Club when Radio Station WHB in Kansas City – at that time one of the very few official government licensed broadcasting stations – offered the Club air time (the owner of Kansas City Station WHB, E.J. Sweeney, was a local member). "Make Life Worthwhile" was the slogan accepted by the organization in 1926.

On May 27, 1929, Andrew Ernest Foye of Pittsburgh, Pennsylvania, was elected President of the Cooperative Clubs International. The well-known Sugar Bowl classic in New Orleans, Louisiana, had its beginning in Sertoma. In 1934, the New Orleans Club began this very successful project when former International Director Warren V. Miller introduced the resolution that the Club sponsor a football contest to be held in New Orleans during the Christmas holiday season.

In the early 1940s, confusion emerged between the Co-Operative Club name and consumer cooperatives. A contest was announced with a $500 cash prize offered for a name which might be selected. A total of 49 names were submitted. The board of directors narrowed the list down to seven to present to the 1948 Albuquerque Convention: Ambassadors, Century, Cooperators, Monarch, Operative, Sertoma and Sponsors. Noble W. Hiatt, then President of the North Indianapolis, Indiana Club, coined the name SERTOMA from the slogan, SERvice TO MAnkind, and his idea was selected. The official name change became effective on June 21, 1950.

=== International focus ===
In 1946, the first Sertoma Club to be chartered in Canada was founded in Windsor, Ontario. The need for an international sponsorship became apparent between 1949 and 1950, and the first sponsorship recommended to Clubs by the International Board of Directors was in 1949 by the Sertoma Club of Phoenix, Arizona, when the Club introduced the YES Program (Youth Employment Service). Sertoma International today holds the copyright to the name "YES", even though local, state and national government involvement in "employment services" has limited the need for Sertoma Club YES Programs. The first Club chartered in Mexico was in Mexico City in 1956. The first International Convention outside the United States was the 1964 Convention, held in Mexico City, Mexico. The first Sertoma Club established in the Commonwealth of Puerto Rico was the San Juan Sertoma Club, chartered on August 14, 1965. Plutarco Guzman became the first Sertoman who was not a United States citizen to be elected President of Sertoma International. The attorney from Monterrey, Nuevo Leon, Mexico, was elected at the 1972 International Convention in Dallas, Texas.

The most significant milestone of the 1970s was the introduction of Serteen and Collegiate Sertoma Clubs. The first Serteen Club, recognized in 1971, was the Page Equine Serteen Club of Greensboro, North Carolina. The first Collegiate Sertoma Club was the Collegiate Sertoma Club of the Kansas State Teachers College of Emporia, Kansas.

=== Other establishments ===
Women were welcomed as members of Sertoma in 1985 and comprise a vital part of the current membership. The first all-female Sertoma Club was the First Progressive Sertoma Club in Tampa, Florida, chartered November 22, 1985. In 1987, the International Board of Directors approved STAND (Sertomans Together Advocate No Drugs), an anti-drug education program, as an International Sponsorship.

In 1992 and 1993, the Communicative Disorders and Hearing Impaired Scholarships were established. Further milestones included the 1997 introduction of the Sertoma Fantasy Baseball Camps and the surpassing of its $10 million goal by the Foundation for the Building A Legacy endowment campaign.

From 2000 to 2002, Sertoma introduced the first city-wide service project as a part of the International Convention in Tampa. The first female president, Diana Caine-Helwig, was elected in 2001. Additionally, the first issue of the Sertoman Digest was published in November 2002, providing readers with an organizational focus.

Sertoma joined the WISE EARS! Coalition, a health education campaign of the National Institute on Deafness and Other Communication Disorders (NIDCD). Headquarters introduced the Sertoma International/WISE EARS! Campaign to the clubs for implementation during May's Better Hearing & Speech Month. This national service project was focused on noise-induced hearing loss.

SERTOMA SAFEEARS! … to hear the future was introduced in January 2005 in order to rebuild Sertoma's brand as the speech and hearing service organization. SAFEEARS! became the first national service project that had support from non-Sertoma corporate and organizational partners.

=== Sertoma Foundation ===
On November 15, 1960, the Sertoma Foundation was formed to strengthen the partnership between international organization and clubs. In 1963, after a long search for an international sponsorship, Sertoma Clubs were encouraged to help the more than 24 million Americans who have speech and hearing disorders. The foundation began to establish Sertoma Centers for Communication Disorders in 1973.

Four years later, the foundation began to encourage affiliation with existing speech and hearing facilities and departments. The Affiliate program has been very successful, with over 300 facilities now affiliated with Sertoma Clubs and the Foundation. The foundation provides the funding for scholarships and grants. It has created public education materials and an advisory council of speech and hearing professionals. It was a founding member of the Council for Better Hearing and Speech Month. In 1986, the Foundation coordinated Better Hearing and Speech Month for the entire country.

In 1992, the Building a Legacy campaign was launched to grow the endowment. Pledge payments and new gifts perpetuate the benefits for Sertoma programs.

Recently, the Legacy 2000 Wills campaign was launched with the philosophy "A will for every Sertoman, Sertoma in every will". Today, the Foundation continues to place strong emphasis on financially supporting the programs of Sertoma International through annual, planned and endowment giving.

=== Merger ===
Approval of the "plan of merger" by the membership authorizes the Boards of Sertoma International and Sertoma Foundation to file, amend, and consolidate legal, governing, and operational documents and procedures necessary to implement the plan and meet the statutory requirements of the State of Missouri. The result being a new Sertoma corporation operating as a national 501(c)(3) public charity effective July 1, 2008.

== Programs and mission activities ==
=== Hard-of-hearing and deaf scholarship ===
Sertoma’s Scholarship for the Deaf or Hard of Hearing is the leading funder of the scholarships for deaf and hard-of-hearing students since the program's inception in 1994. Students with clinically significant bilateral hearing loss, graduating from high school, or undergraduate students pursuing four-year college degrees in any discipline are eligible for the scholarship.

=== Communicative disorders scholarship ===
Sertoma’s annual Communicative Disorders Scholarship Program, funded by the Sertoma Annual Fund, is for graduate students pursuing advanced degrees in audiology or speech-language pathology from institutions in the U.S. These scholarships, worth $1,000 each, are awarded in the spring to help offset the cost of tuition, books and fees incurred during the following school year. Sertoma's Communicative Disorders Scholarships Program provides more funds nationally for graduate level study in communicative disorders than any other single organization.

=== Adopt-An-Agency ===
Sertoma Affiliates are non-profit hearing and speech facilities that have established a relationship with a Sertoma Club or have an independent relationship with Sertoma. This relationship results in greater service to people with communicative disorders by supporting the professional staff and programs of the affiliate.

=== SAFEEars! ===
SAFEEars! National Service Project was developed to provide a national identity in order to spread the club's mission and attract new members. With minimal financial outlay and time commitments, SERTOMA SAFEEars! was developed. This project can help in fundraising and membership recruitment.

=== A Sound Investment ===
The goal is to make the sounds through public address and amplified systems in public facilities readily accessible to those that use hearing assistive devices. This goal can be achieved by promoting and assisting in installing looping technology of public buildings and facilities. This effort will not only provide access that should be available, but will promote the value and importance of hearing health services and technology.

== Sertoma Community Support ==
=== Volunteer Development ===
Provides support of the Certified Trainer Program and the trainings for clubs; development of new training materials.

=== Serteen Clubs ===
Open to students 11 through 19, in the junior high, middle school, high school, or community that promotes growth of individuals, good government, leadership, mutual tolerance and understanding among all people, and friendship and fellowship as opportunities for Service to Mankind.

=== Collegiate clubs ===
Limited to college-enrolled students, this program promotes growth of the individuals, good government, leadership, mutual tolerance and understanding among all people, and friendship and fellowship as opportunities for Service to Mankind.

=== SHARP ===
The Sertoma Hearing Aid Recycling Program helps needy people obtain hearing aids. Clubs collect used hearing aids, have them refurbished and distribute them to people in need.
