= Charlotte Fire Department =

Fire department in North Carolina, U.S.

Operational area
- Country: United States
- State: North Carolina
- City: Charlotte

Agency overview
- Established: 1875
- Annual calls: ~137,000 (2022)
- Employees: 1,300 (2022)
- Annual budget: $137,741,974 (2021)
- Staffing: Career
- Fire chief: Reginald Johnson
- IAFF: 660

Facilities and equipment
- Divisions: 1
- Battalions: 9
- Stations: 45
- Engines: 44
- Trucks: 14
- Tillers: 1
- Platforms: 5
- Rescues: 2
- Tenders: 6
- HAZMAT: 4
- USAR: 6
- Airport crash: 10
- Wildland: 5
- Fireboats: 2
- Rescue boats: 4

Website
- Official website
- IAFF website

The Charlotte Fire Department (CFD) provides fire suppression, emergency medical services, technical rescue services, hazardous materials mitigation, disaster response, code enforcement, fire investigations, and public education for the city of Charlotte, North Carolina, United States. The department is responsible for an area of approximately 312 square miles (810 km^{2}) with a day population of two million and a night population of 885,000.

== History ==
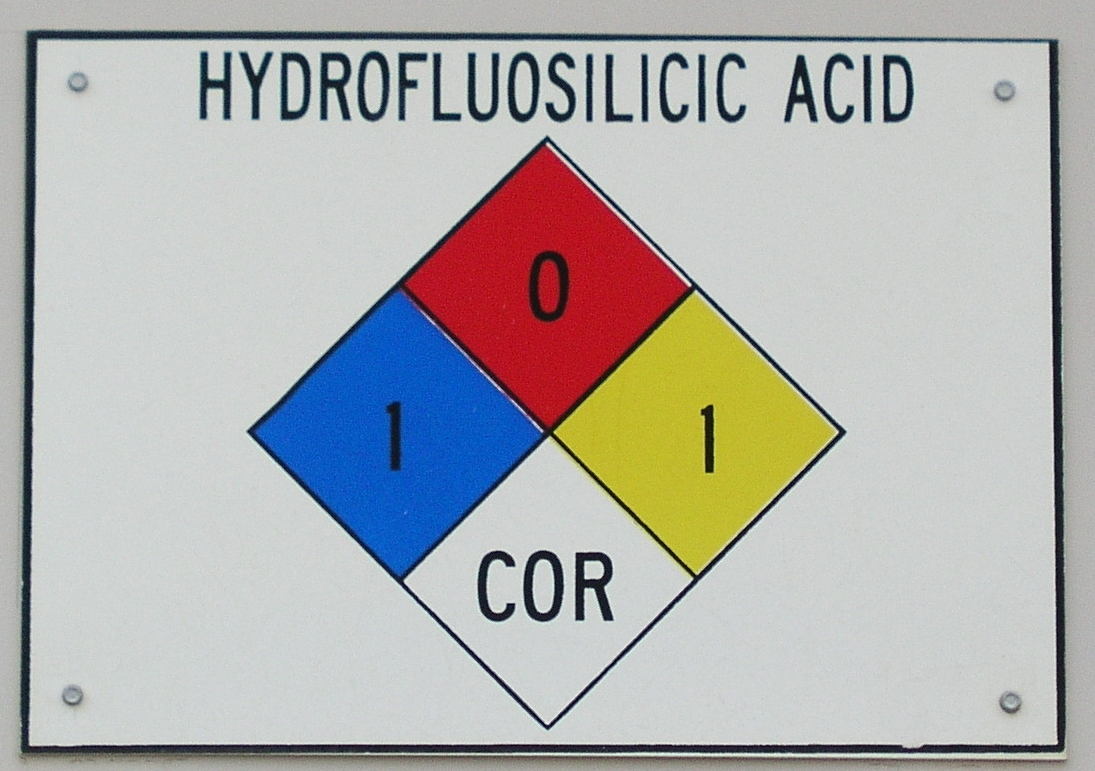
An example of the NFPA 704 "safety square", developed on the initiative of the CFD

The Charlotte Fire Department was officially formed in 1875, although fire services existed in the area for decades before that.

Charlotte Fire Department developed the NFPA 704 "fire diamond" found on chemicals which depicts in a simple and clear manner the flammability, health hazards and reactivity of the substance. A fire at the Charlotte Chemical Company in 1959 led to severe injuries to many of the firefighters. Upon arrival, the fire crew found a fire burning inside a vat that firefighters assumed to be burning kerosene. The crew tried to suppress the fire with water, which resulted in the vat exploding due to metallic sodium being stored in the kerosene. Thirteen firefighters were injured, several of whom had critical injuries while one lost both ears and most of his face from the incident. At the time, such vats were not labelled with the materials they contained, so firefighters did not have the necessary information to recognize that hazardous materials were present, which required a specific response. In this case, sodium was able to react with water to release hydrogen gas and large amounts of heat.

The Charlotte Fire Department developed training to respond to fires involving hazardous materials, ensured that protective clothing was available to those responding, and expanded the fire prevention inspection program. Fire Marshal J. F. Morris developed the diamond-shaped placard as a marking system to indicate when a building contained hazardous materials.

== Stations and apparatus ==
As of July 2026 this is the list of stations and apparatus for the department:

Street	Engine Company	Ladder Company	Rescue Company	Special Unit	Battalion Chief Unit
Myers Street	Engine 1	Ladder 1		Field Comm 1 & 2, MCP 1, Vent 1, Division Chief (Car10)	Battalion Chief 1
South Boulevard	Engine 2	Ladder 2			
Monroe Road	Engine 3	Tower 3			
Church Street	Engine 4	Ladder 4			
Wesley Heights Way	Engine 5			Brush 5	
Laurel Avenue	Engine 6				
Davidson Street	Engine 7				
The Plaza	Engine 8				
McKee Road	Engine 9			Tanker 9	
Wilkinson Boulevard	Engine 10		Rescue 10	Dive 10	Battalion Chief 3
28th Street	Engine 11		Rescue 11	Dive 11	Battalion Chief 9
Inwood Drive	Engine 12				
Glenwood Drive	Engine 13	Ladder 13		Hazmat 13	
Sharon Amity Road	Engine 14				
Frontenac Avenue	Engine 15				
Park South Drive	Engine 16	Ladder 16			
Morris Field Drive		Ladder 17		Blazes 1, 2, 5, & 14	Battalion Chief 8
Dr. Webber Avenue	Engine 18	Tower 18			
Sardis Lane	Engine 19				
Nations Ford Road	Engine 20	Ladder 20			Battalion Chief 5
Little Rock Road	Engine 21			Brush 21 & Foam 21	
Sugar Creek Road	Engine 22			Tanker 22	
W.T. Harris Boulevard	Engine 23	Ladder 23			
Pineville Matthews Road	Engine 24	Ladder 24			
Pleasant Grove Road	Engine 25			Foam 25	Battalion Chief 6
Tryon Street	Engine 26	Tower 26			
Ken Hoffman Drive	Engine 27	Tower 27			Battalion Chief 2
Old Statesville Road	Engine 28	Ladder 28			
Margaret Wallace Road	Engine 29			Brush 29	
Beam Road	Engine 30			Brush 30	
Ridge Road	Engine 31	Ladder 31		Brush 31	
Bryant Farms Road	Engine 32	Ladder 32		Hazmat 32	
Mount Holly Huntersville Road	Engine 33	Ladder 33		Deluge 33, Tanker 33	
Rocky River Road	Engine 34			Decon 34, Hazmat 34	
Pavilion Boulevard	Engine 35			Tanker 35	
Mallard Creek Church Road	Engine 36			MOC 1	
Tryon Street	Engine 37 Engine 90			Tanker 37	
Shopton Road West	Engine 38			Dive 38, Fire Boat 38	
Providence Road	Engine 39	Ladder 39			Battalion Chief 7
Harrisburg Road	Engine 40	Ladder 40		Tanker 40	
West Boulevard				Blazes 41, 42, & 47	
Central Avenue	Engine 42, Engine 65				Battalion Chief 4
Clanton Road	Engine 43			USAR 1	
Dixie River Road	Engine 44				
Tryon Street		Ladder 45			
Miranda Road (Under Construction)	Engine 46				

== See also ==
- Fire Station No. 2 (Charlotte, North Carolina)
- Palmer Fire School
