= Mountain rescue in the United States =

In the United States, mountain rescue is handled by professional teams within some national parks and by volunteer teams elsewhere. Volunteer teams are often members of the Mountain Rescue Association (MRA).

Under the National Incident Management System, mountain rescue unit qualifications are standardized.

Occasionally there are editorials or legislative bills suggesting that climbers should be charged for rescues, particularly after a sensational high-profile rescue. The American Alpine Club has released a report explaining the costs of a rescue and the potential problems resulting from charging for rescues. The MRA has issued a similar defense of climbers interests.

== Mountain rescue in the National Parks ==
Parks with professional teams include Denali National Park, Yosemite National Park, Grand Teton National Park, and Mount Rainier National Park. National parks often call for the help of volunteer teams in their region, using a statewide Mutual Aid system, when they are not able to provide enough resources to search and or rescue effectively.

== Mountain Rescue Association ==
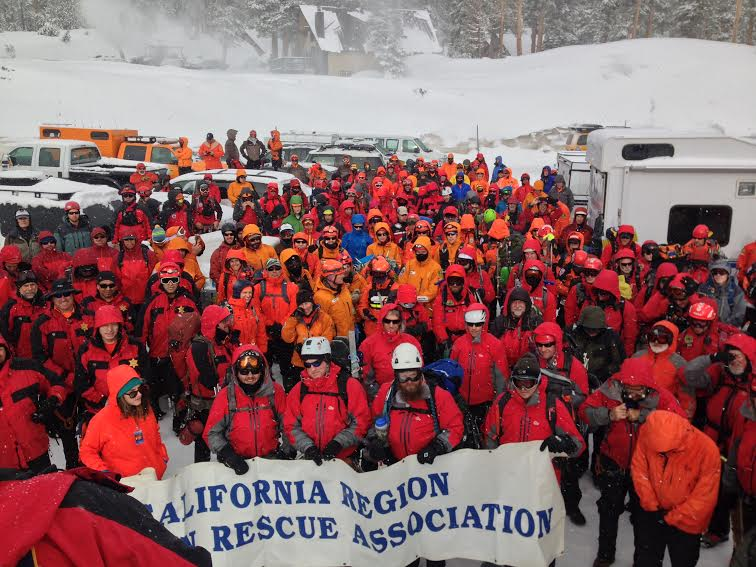
California Regional Mountain Rescue Association in Mammoth Lakes, CA. 2016

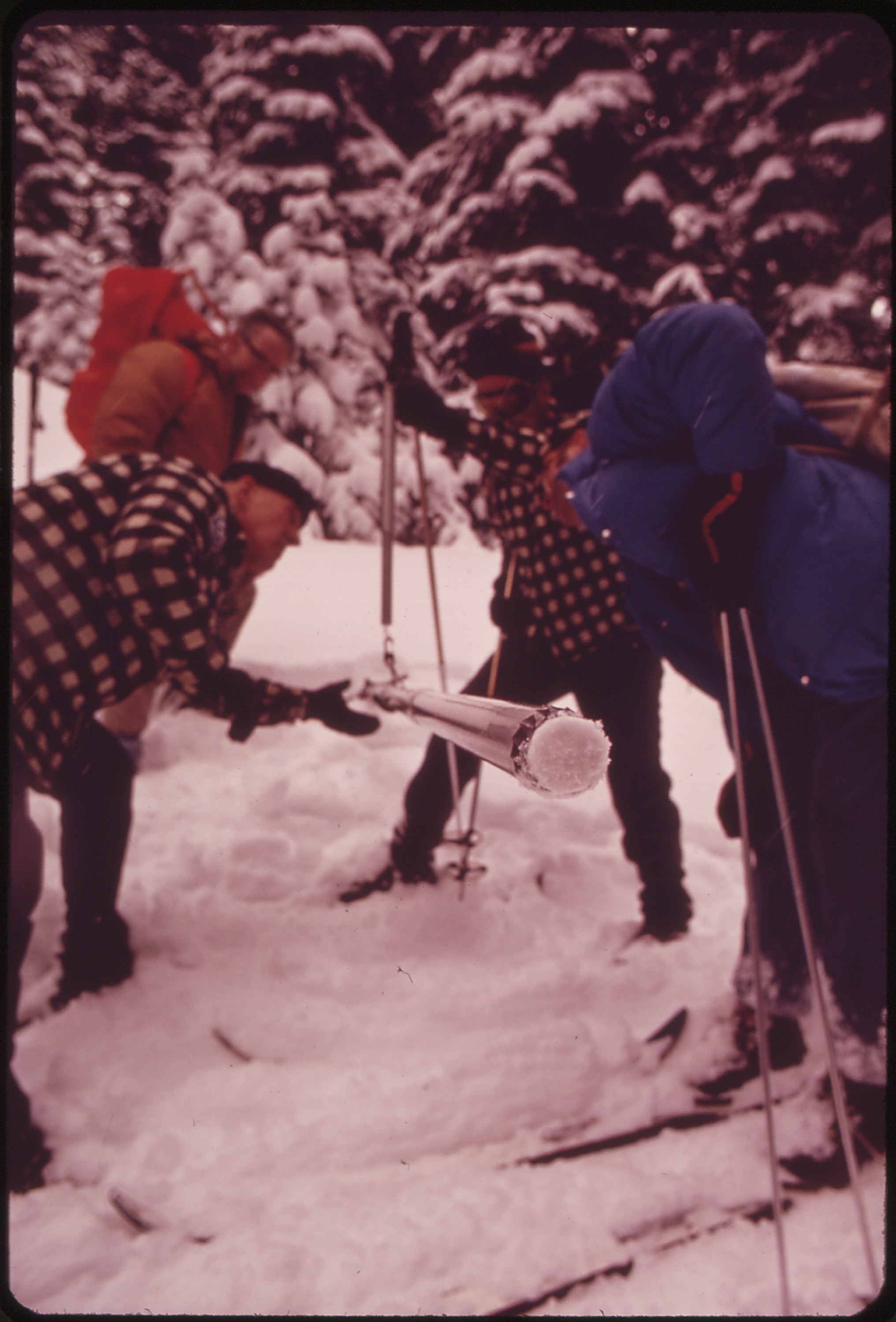
The Crag Rats helping with a snow survey at Tilly Jane Campground on Mount Hood (March 1973).

The Mountain Rescue Association (also called the MRA) is an organization of teams dedicated to saving lives through rescue and mountain safety education. The association was founded in 1959. As of 2007, the association is made up of over two thousand volunteers, divided in several dozen units. The Mountain Rescue Association is split up into eight different regions throughout the United States and each region is run by a separate group of elected volunteers. These include the Alaska Region, the Appalachian Region, the California Region, the Desert Mountain Region, the Inter Mountain Region, the Oregon Region, the Rocky Mountain Region, and the Washington Region.

The Mountain Rescue Association is mostly made up of unpaid professional volunteers who have been accredited by the Mountain Rescue Association in Mountain Search and Rescue operations. Teams regularly reaccredit in three disciplines including Search Management and Tracking, Snow and Ice Rescue, and Technical Rock Rescue. The remainder of MRA teams are “Ex-officio” units, which are paid professionals in governmental service, and “Associate” units which are other mountain SAR related teams or groups.

The Mountain Rescue Association aims to improving the quality, availability, and safety of mountain search and rescue through;

- Creating a framework for and accrediting member teams
- Promoting mountain safety education
- Providing a forum for development and exchange of information on mountain search and rescue techniques, equipment, and safety
- Representing member teams providing mountain search and rescue services to requesting governmental agencies

The Mountain Rescue Association was established in 1959 at Timberline Lodge at Mount Hood, Oregon making it the oldest Search and Rescue association in the United States.

MRA founding members: The AFRCC (then known as the Aerospace Rescue and Recovery Center); The U.S. Army 10th Mountain Division; The National Park Service; The National Ski Patrol; The American Alpine Club; The Mountaineers; The Hood River Crag Rats, Oregon; The Portland Mountain Rescue Unit, Oregon; The Corvallis Mountain Rescue Unit, Oregon; The Seattle Mountain Rescue Council, Washington; The Everett Mountain Rescue Unit, Washington; The Olympic Mountain Rescue, Washington; The Tacoma Mountain Rescue Unit, Washington; The Idaho Mountain Search and Rescue Unit, Idaho; The Altadena Mountain Rescue Unit, California.

== See also ==
- Federal Emergency Management Agency
- Civil defense by country
- Civil Contingencies Secretariat – UK equivalent emergency management agency
- FEMA photo library
- National Emergency Technology Guard
- Emergency Preparedness Canada – Canadian counterpart disaster response agency
- U.S. Fire Administration
- Emergency management
- Paramedics in the United States
- Certified first responder
- Search and rescue in the United States
- FEMA Urban Search and Rescue Task Force
- National Association for Search and Rescue
