= National Association for Search and Rescue =

The National Association For Search And Rescue
- Abbreviation: NASAR
- Formation: 1972; 54 years ago
- Type: Virginia Non-Profit, Federal 501c3
- Headquarters: Centreville, VA
- Region served: Americas, Italy
- Executive Director, COO: Christopher Boyer
- Board Chair: MIchael Vorachek
- Website: https://nasar.org/

The National Association for Search and Rescue (NASAR) has been in existence since 1972. Originally started to represent the State Search and Rescue Coordinators, NASAR grew to represent all SAR volunteers and continues to support the State Search And Rescue Coordinators Committee (SSARCC). NASAR uses standards developed by ASTM, NFPA, DHS, FEMA, and other respected bodies to build education courseware, publications, and certifications. Government agencies and non-profit search and rescue teams use NASAR's material and certifications to build credentialing programs for their organizations and produce highly skilled searchers that work within their communities and are available for mutual aid regionally and nationally. NASAR is a Virginia non-profit and federal 501(c)(3) organization.
