= Alexander House =

Alexander House may refer to:

== United States ==
(by state then city)

- Old Alexander House, Magnolia, Arizona, listed on the National Register of Historic Places (NRHP) in Columbia County
- Ashley-Alexander House, Scott, Arizona, NRHP-listed in Lonoke County
- Alexander House (Salida, Colorado), NRHP-listed
- Cecil and Hermione Alexander House, Atlanta, Georgia, NRHP-listed
- Alexander-Cleveland House, Ruckersville, Georgia, NRHP-listed in Georgia
- Gilbert-Alexander House, Washington, Georgia, NRHP-listed in Georgia
- Alexander House (Boise, Idaho), NRHP-listed in Idaho
- Alexander Plantation House, Midway, Kentucky, NRHP-listed in Kentucky
- Allen-Alexander House, Paris, Kentucky, NRHP-listed in Kentucky
- Simeon Alexander Jr. House, Northfield, Massachusetts, NRHP-listed in Massachusetts
- Arad Alexander House, Worcester, Massachusetts, NRHP-listed in Massachusetts
- Alexander and Busey Houses, Kalispell, Montana, NRHP-listed in Montana
- Ryons-Alexander House, Lincoln, Nebraska, NRHP-listed in Nebraska
- Mrs. Minnie Alexander Cottage, Asheville, North Carolina, NRHP-listed in North Carolina
- Hezekiah Alexander House, Charlotte, North Carolina, NRHP-listed in North Carolina
- Neal Somers Alexander House, Charlotte, North Carolina, NRHP-listed in North Carolina
- William T. Alexander House, Charlotte, North Carolina, NRHP-listed in North Carolina
- Dr. William S. Alexander House, Oxford, Ohio, NRHP-listed in Ohio
- Alexander–Hill House, Seneca, South Carolina, NRHP-listed in South Carolina
- Alexander House (Spartanburg, South Carolina), NRHP-listed in South Carolina
- John Alexander House, Maryville, Tennessee, NRHP-listed in Tennessee
- Alexander-Campbell House, Abilene, Texas, NRHP-listed in Texas
- William D. Alexander House, Provo, Utah, NRHP-listed in Utah
- Milldean and Alexander-Davis House, Grafton, Vermont, NRHP-listed in Vermont
- Alexander-Withrow House, Lexington, Virginia, NRHP-listed in Virginia
- James Alexander House, Spottswood, Virginia, NRHP-listed in Virginia

== United Kingdom ==
- Alexander House, Corsham, a grade II* listed house at High Street, Corsham, Wiltshire, England
