= Eastland (disambiguation) =

The Eastland was a passenger ship used for tours, based in Chicago, Illinois, United States.

Eastland may refer to:

- Eastland, an obsolete name for Estonia
- USS Eastland (APA-163), a U.S. Navy attack transport ship launched in 1944
- Eastland Company, an English crown-chartered company founded in 1579
- Eastland Shopping Centre, Ringwood, Victoria, Australia
- Eastland Center, any of several shopping malls
- Eastland Mall, any of several shopping malls
- Eastland (Charlotte neighborhood), North Carolina, United States
- Eastland, Lexington, Kentucky, United States
- Eastland County, Texas, United States
  - Eastland, Texas, county seat of Eastland County
- Eastland, an unofficial name of northeastern New Zealand, see Gisborne District

== People with the surname ==
- James Eastland (1904–1986), American politician

== See also ==
- Ostland
- Österland
- Eastlands (disambiguation)
- Eastland High School (disambiguation)
