= Copeland House =

Copeland House may refer to:

- Henry Copeland House, Pleasant Grove, Arkansas, listed on the National Register of Historic Places in Stone County, Arkansas
- Wesley Copeland House, Timbo, Arkansas, listed on the National Register of Historic Places in Stone County, Arkansas
- William and Ann Copeland Jr. House, Shiloh, Georgia, listed on the National Register of Historic Places in Harris County, Georgia
- George Copeland House, Davenport, Iowa, listed on the National Register of Historic Places in Scott County, Iowa
- Samuel Copeland House, Worcester, Massachusetts, listed on the NRHP in Massachusetts
- Copeland House (Ehrhardt, South Carolina), listed on the National Register of Historic Places in Bamberg County, South Carolina
- Williams-Ball-Copeland House, Laurens, South Carolina, listed on the National Register of Historic Places in Laurens County, South Carolina
- Copeland House (Parksville, Tennessee), listed on the National Register of Historic Places in Polk County, Tennessee
- Austin Copeland House I, Houston, Texas, listed on the National Register of Historic Places in Harris County, Texas
- Austin Copeland House II, Houston, Texas, listed on the National Register of Historic Places in Harris County, Texas
