= Charlotte Museum of History =

- Location in North Carolina
- Established: Informally, May 18, 1929 Formally, February 5, 1969
- Location: 3500 Shamrock Drive, Charlotte, North Carolina, United States
- Coordinates: 35.1355°N 80.6400°W
- Type: History museum
- President: Terri L. White
- Website: www.charlottemuseum.org

Charlotte Museum of History is a history museum located in Charlotte, North Carolina, United States. Originally founded to be the steward of the 1774 Alexander Rock House, the museum has since expanded its scope to cover all periods of Charlotte's history with exhibits covering everything from the history of music in the city to the experiences of soldiers from Charlotte during the 1st World War.

== History ==
The first historic tour of what is now known as the 1774 Alexander Rock House was conducted on May 18, 1929 by the Daughters of the American Revolution in honor of Meck Dec Day. Tours sporadically took place between then and the early 1940s for special events, hosted by the DAR.

In 1943, then owner of the 1774 Rock House Mr. Eugene M. Cole donated the structure and surrounding farm to the Western North Carolina Annual Conference of the Methodist Church for a planned retirement community known as the Methodist Home, now called Aldersgate. In 1949, the Daughters of the American Revolution leased the house and some of the surrounding land from the Methodist Home in hopes of preserving it. Renovations started soon thereafter hoping to restore the Rock House to what it would have looked like in the 1770s. During this time, a committee of DAR chapters allowed people to take tours of the property. The Hezekiah Alexander Home Foundation was formed in 1969 to better facilitate fundraising and renovations for the house, and eventually raising $200,000 to help continue restoration. However, though progress had been made, the foundation could not complete a planned nearby reception center on its own.

In 1975, the Charlotte city council put the home under the Mint Museum. The home site was called Mint Museum of History until November 1985, when the Mint Museum finished work on expansion that would allow all operations to move to Randolph Road. On October 13, 1986, the Mint Museum voted to go along with the city council's plan to move the museum to the city's parks and recreation department. This resulted from complaints that the Mint Museum lacked interest in history, but the change also would allow the Mint Museum to focus on fine arts rather than history.

The foundation took over administration of the house and museum in 1990. The city required that $2 million be raised, and the foundation exceeded that amount by more than $1 million.

Late in 1993, the Charlotte Museum of History moved its archives and a 5000-piece historical collection, divided among many locations, into a 1500-square-foot addition to its 5000-square-foot building.

In 1996, the foundation began work on a 36,000-square-foot building. With $7 million raised, the building officially opened October 24, 1999. In 2002, the foundation changed its name to Charlotte Museum of History, Inc.

== Historic Structures ==
=== Alexander Homesite ===
The museum is home to the 1774 Alexander Rock House along with several outbuildings which are a five-minute walk from the rear of the main building with tours of the House's interior given on the hour.

Completed in 1774, the Rock House is the oldest building in Mecklenburg County and was named to the National Register of Historic Places in 1970. The home is notable not only for its age, but also because it was home to supposed signer of the Mecklenburg Declaration of Independence, Hezekiah Alexander.

=== Siloam School ===
The Siloam School is a historic Rosenwald School which the museum restored and moved to museum grounds on September 5, 2023. The official re-opening was June 15, 2024. The school was added to the National Register of Historic Places in 2007.
