= Mint Museum =

Museum in Charlotte, North Carolina

Coordinates: 35.1974°N 80.8146°W

The Mint Museum, also referred to as The Mint Museums, is a cultural institution comprising two museums, located in Charlotte, North Carolina. The Mint Museum Randolph and Mint Museum Uptown, together these two locations have hundreds of collections showcasing art and design from around the globe.

In 2018, The Mint Museum announced Todd A. Herman, PhD, former Executive Director at The Arkansas Arts Center, as the new president and CEO. Bruce LaRowe, former Executive Director of Children's Theatre of Charlotte, was the Interim CEO on June 21, 2017. He assumed the role after the end of Dr. Kathleen V. Jameson's presidency in 2017.

== Mint Museum Randolph ==
Mint Museum Randolph
- Established: 1936
- Location: 2730 Randolph Road; Charlotte, North Carolina 28207
- Type: Art
- Directors: Todd A. Herman, President & CEO
- Website: http://www.mintmuseum.org/

Mint Museum Randolph resides in a federal style building that once housed the Charlotte Mint. Opening in 1936, it was the first art museum in North Carolina, USA. The permanent collections include American Art, Ancient American Art, American and European ceramics, American and European Decorative Art, North Carolina Pottery, historic costume and fashionable dress and accessories, African Art, Asian Art, historic maps, Contemporary art, and photography. The companion Mint Museum of Craft + Design focuses on contemporary craft.

=== Collection highlights ===
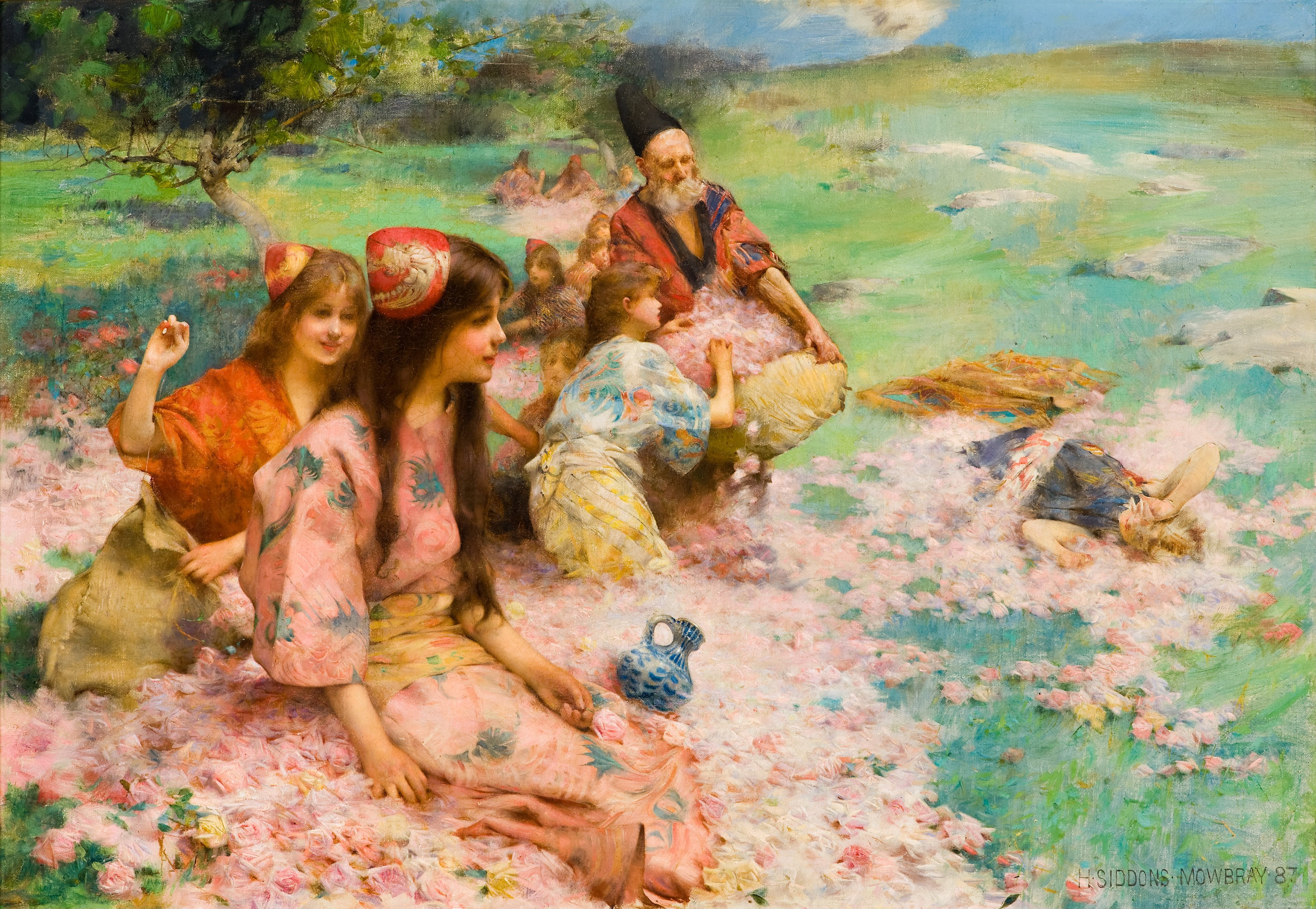
Rose Harvest by Harry Siddons Mowbray, 1887

The Mint Museum is the largest visual arts institution in Charlotte and holds the largest public collection of Charlotte-born artist Romare Bearden's work.

The American Art collection comprises approximately 900 works created between the late 1700s and circa 1945. It includes portraiture of the Federal era, 19th century landscapes, and paintings from the group known as "The Eight" (Robert Henri, George Luks, William Glackens, John Sloan, Everett Shinn, Maurice Prendergast, Ernest Lawson, and Arthur Bowen Davies). Additional highlights in this area include works by John Singleton Copley, Gilbert Stuart, Thomas Sully, and Hudson River School painters Thomas Cole and Sanford Gifford.

The Art of the Ancient Americas collection includes roughly 2,000 objects from more than 40 cultures, spanning more than 4,500 years. The collection includes body adornments, tools, ceramic vessels, sculpture, textiles, and metal ornaments.

There are about 2,230 objects in the Mint's collection of Contemporary Art. These include the Bearden collection and other works on paper, contemporary sculpture, and photography from circa 1945 to the present.

The Mint's Decorative Arts collection, considered one of the finest in the country, centers on its holdings in ceramics. Containing more than 12,000 objects from 2000 B.C. to 1950 A.D., the collection includes a wide variety of ancient Chinese ceramics, 18th century European and English wares, American art pottery, and North Carolina pottery. The Mint has the largest and most comprehensive collection of North Carolina pottery in the nation. Its collection of North Carolina pottery comprises some 2,200 objects, dating from the 1700s.

The museum's Delhom collection, given to the Mint in 1966, contains 2,000 pieces of historic pottery and porcelain, as well as pre-Columbian pieces that are more than 4,500 years old.

Almost 10,000 items of men's, women's, and children's fashions from the early 18th century to present-day haute couture are included in the museum's collection of Historic Costume and Fashionable Dress, which approaches fashion as an art form.

== Mint Museum of Craft + Design ==
The Mint Museum of Uptown
- Established: 1999
- Location: 500 South Tryon Street; Charlotte, North Carolina
- Type: Craft and Design
- Directors: Mr. Bruce LaRowe, Interim CEO
- Website: http://www.mintmuseum.org

The Mint Museum of Craft + Design honors the legacy of the Charlotte region's rich craft heritage by collecting artistic craft in glass, metal, fiber, wood, mixed-media, and clay, including jewelry and furniture. With over 2,500 works, its permanent collections "present the creative evolution of studio craft from the utilitarian objects of the 19th century to the art of today". It also encourages the creation of art, spawns collaborations and dialogue, and serves as a forum for artists, craft theory, aesthetics and technology.

The Mint Museum of Craft + Design has been proclaimed as one of the foremost craft museums in the nation. It opened in 1999 following an $8.2 million donation to the Mint Museum of Art for purchase of a separate space to house the museum's craft and design collection in Charlotte's Uptown. Its permanent collection has been described as "complex and eclectic", featuring "everything from fine jewelry to fiber arts, from wacky, satirical, narrative ceramic sculpture...to product design."

The museum closed in February 2010 to begin a move from its building on North Tryon Street to its new home in the Mint Museum Uptown at Levine Center for the Arts. It reopened as part of the Mint Museum Uptown in October 2010. The move expanded the collection's gallery space from 10,000 square feet (930 m^{2}) to 18,000 square feet (1,700 m^{2}) in the new facility.

== Mint Museum Uptown ==
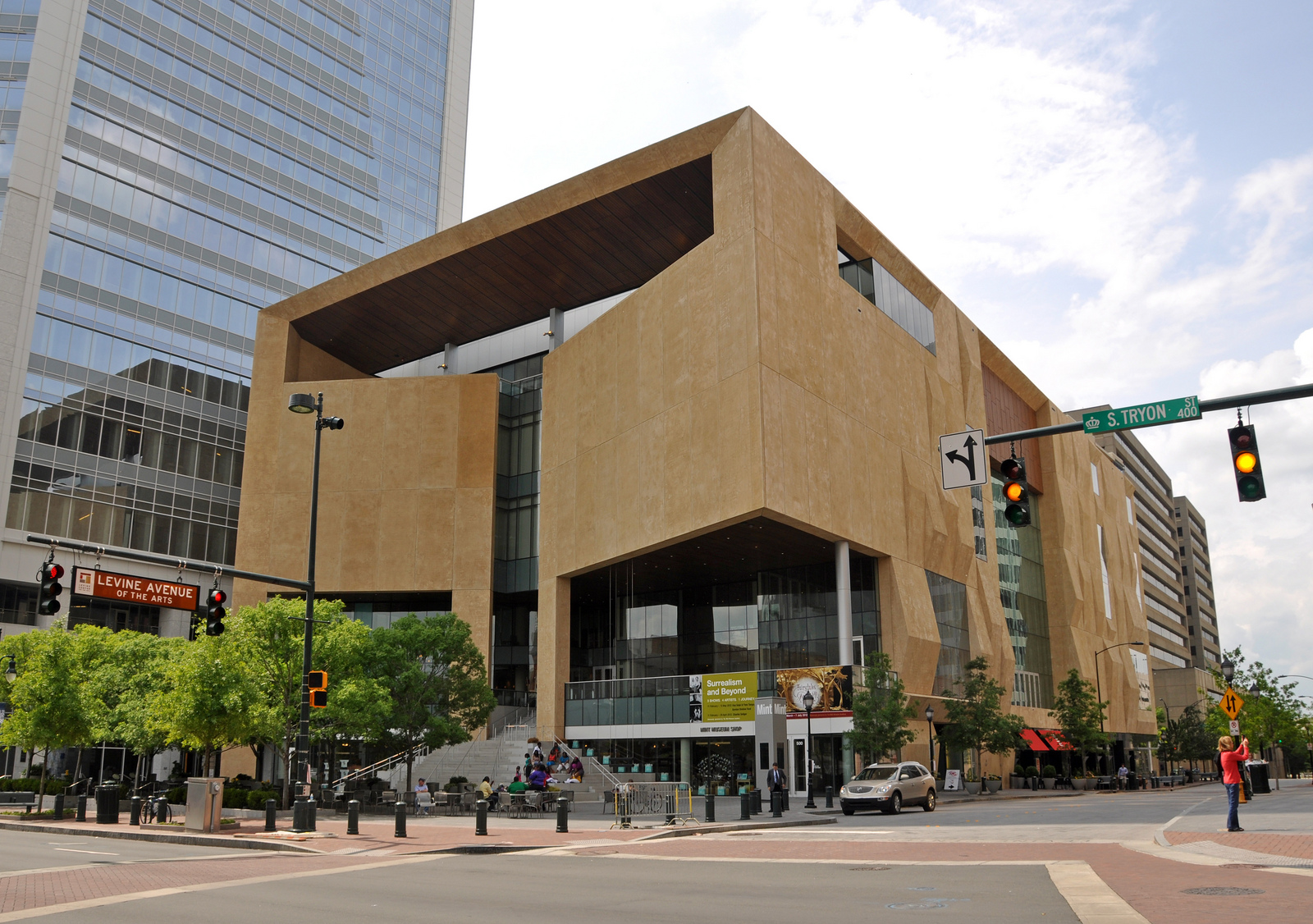
Mint Museum in Uptown Charlotte

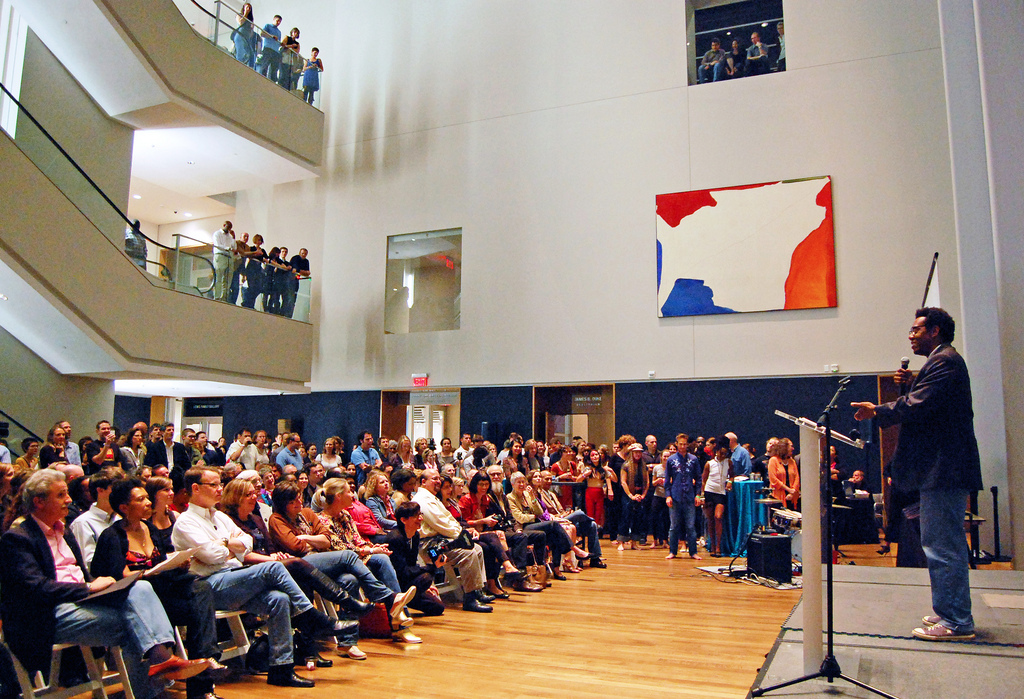
Mint Museum interior

With the help of grants and the Arts & Science Council the Mint Museum's new 145,000-square-foot (13,500 m^{2}) location opened on October 1, 2010. Designed by Machado and Silvetti Associates of Boston, the building's estimated cost is $57 million. Now that it is complete, this building is known as the Mint Museum Uptown.

The Uptown location spreads over five floors and houses collections of glass, ceramics, wood and other material from the Mint Museum of Craft + Design. Contemporary Art, American Art and some of the European Art collections from the Randolph Road facility have also moved to the new location, bringing the Mint's arts and craft and fine arts focuses under one roof for the first time.

The historic Randolph Road building remains open. Renovations and reinstallation are scheduled to highlight the museum's holdings in Ceramics; Historic Costume and Fashionable Dress; Ancient American Art; Asian Art; Coins & Currency; Decorative Arts; and Spanish Colonial Art.

== Randolph Road building ==
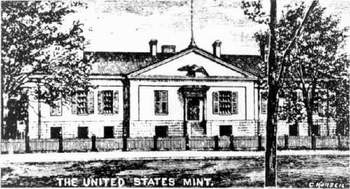
The Charlotte Mint from an 1850 drawing

The oldest section of the Randolph Road building originally served as the home of the first branch of the United States Mint. Designed by noted architect William Strickland, construction of the Federal-style Charlotte Mint building began in 1836 by Perry & Ligon of Raleigh, North Carolina at a cost of $29,800.00. It opened July 27, 1837 at its original location at 403 West Trade Street. The facility coined $5 million in gold from 1836 to the outbreak of the Civil War.

In 1931, when Mecklenburg County planned to expand the main post office, located adjacent to the Mint, the building became endangered. Widespread public support for preserving the building on its original site proved futile. When the U.S. Treasury Department stated that it had no objection to anyone moving the building to another site, in 1933, a group of citizens raised $950 for the dismantling and removal of the Strickland building to its present location on donated land on Randolph Road. The museum formally opened to the public on October 22, 1936, as North Carolina's first art museum. The building underwent major expansions in 1967 and 1985.

The structure was placed on the Charlotte-Mecklenburg Historic Landmarks Commission's List of Designated Historic Landmarks in 1976.

As part of a planned renovation of its Randolph Road campus, the museum announced in April 2012 that it will open a research center based on North Carolina pottery at the facility. The research center will offer relics in the extensive collection for study and open its pottery archives to scholars and students for study. The pottery archives currently includes 19,000 volumes.

== Mint Museum of History ==
The Mint Museum of History began in 1976 at the Hezekiah Alexander House on Shamrock Drive. The Mint Museum ran the site until 1987, when the city's parks and recreation department took over. At that time the name changed to Charlotte Museum of History.
