= Eastland Mall =

Eastland Mall may refer to:

- Eastland Mall (Bloomington, Illinois)
- Eastland Mall (Evansville, Indiana)
- Eastland Mall (Charlotte, North Carolina)
- Eastland Mall (Columbus, Ohio)
- Eastland Mall (North Versailles, Pennsylvania)

== Formerly known as Eastland Mall ==
- Eastgate Metroplex, Tulsa, Oklahoma
- Courtland Center, Burton, Michigan

== See also ==
- Eastland Center
