= Siloam School (Charlotte, North Carolina) =

Historic school building in North Carolina, United States

- U.S. National Register of Historic Places
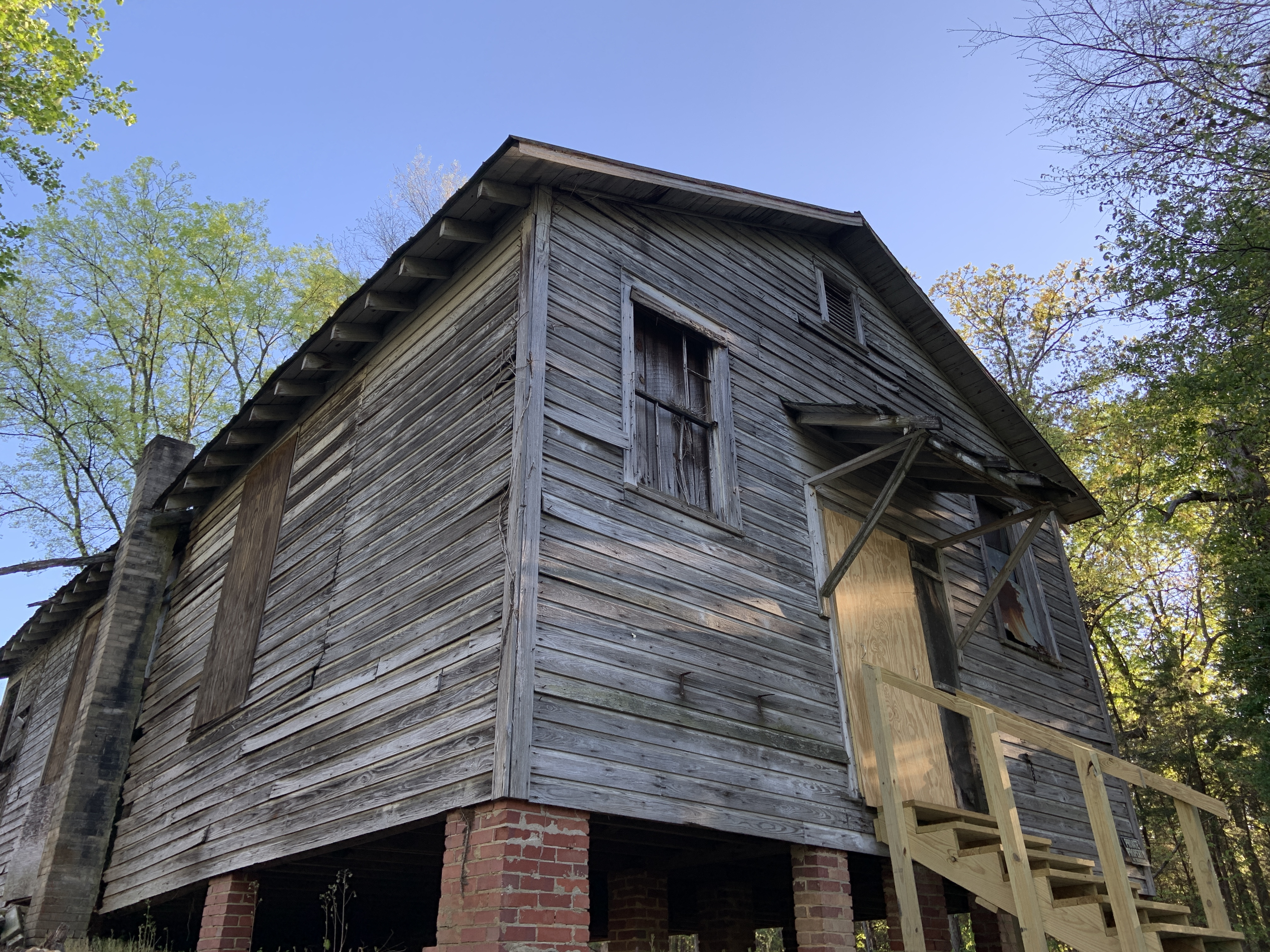
- Siloam School as it appeared in 2020

- Location within North Carolina Location within the United States
- Location: W side of Mallard Highlands Dr, Approx. 0.25 mi. S from jct. of John Adams Rd., Charlotte, North Carolina
- Coordinates: 35°20′10″N 80°44′20″W
- Area: 1.1 acres (0.45 ha)
- Built: 1920
- Architectural style: Rosenwald
- NRHP reference No.: 07001011
- Added to NRHP: September 28, 2007

Siloam School is a historic Rosenwald School building located at Charlotte, Mecklenburg County, North Carolina. It was built about 1920 as a school for African-American students. It is a one-story, gable-front, one-room school building. It measures approximately 22 feet by 43 feet. The building ceased to operate as a school about 1947.

It was added to the National Register of Historic Places in 2007.

== Restoration ==
In 2016, the Charlotte Museum of History agreed to lead a campaign to preserve the historic school building. The Save Siloam School Project met its fundraising goals in November 2022, and the Siloam School was relocated to the museum's eight-acre campus on September 8, 2023. The building will be stabilized, restored, and converted for use as a teaching resource to highlight the experiences of rural African-American families in Mecklenburg County in the early twentieth century. A grand reopening took place June 15, 2024.
