= Eastlands =

Eastlands may refer to:

- Eastlands, Manchester, an area of east Manchester, England
  - The City of Manchester Stadium, often shortened to Eastlands, Manchester
- Eastlands area, Nairobi lying to the south-east of Nairobi province
- Eastlands Shopping Centre, a shopping center in Hobart

== See also ==
- Österlanden
- Eastland (disambiguation)
