= Eastland (Charlotte neighborhood) =

Coordinates: 35.213°N 80.768°W

- Neighborhood
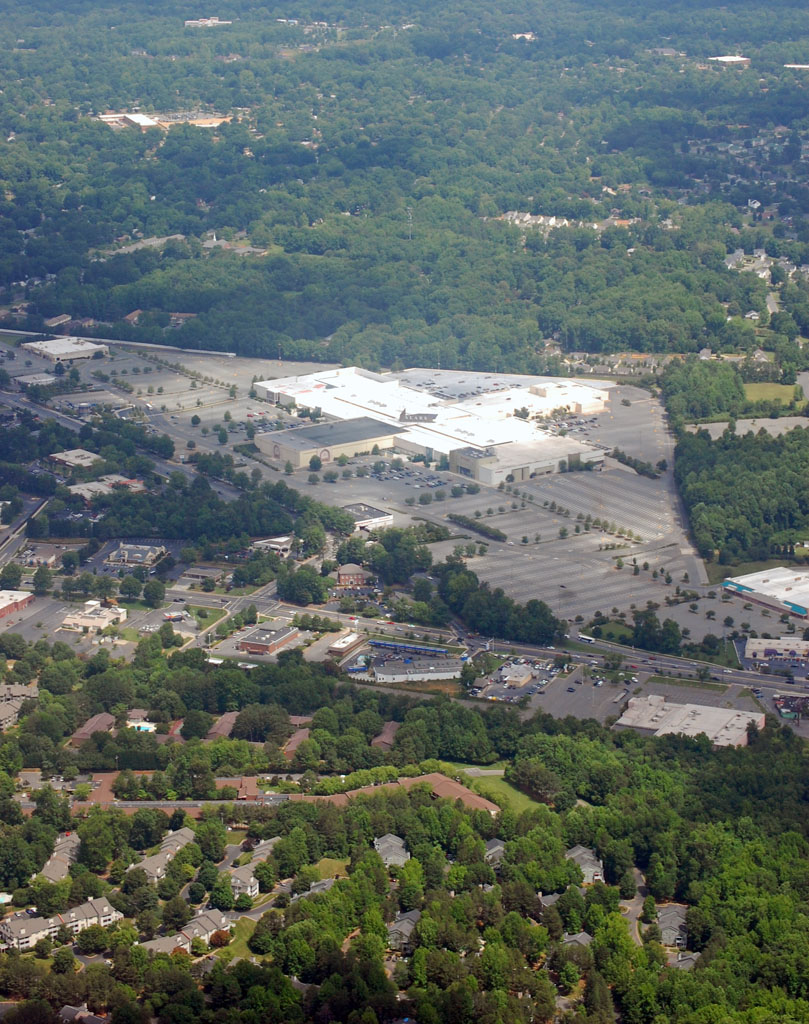
- Aerial of the Eastland neighborhood. The mall in the foreground was demolished in 2014.
- Nickname: Eastland-Wilora Lake or Wilora Lake
- Interactive map of Eastland
- Country: United States
- State: North Carolina
- County: Mecklenburg
- City: Charlotte
- Council District: 5
- Neighborhood Profile Areas: 127, 167, 197

Government
  - City Council: Matt Newton (D)

Area
  - Total: 967 acres (391 ha)

Population (2015)
  - Total: 5,772
  - Density: 3,820/sq mi (1,470/km^{2})
- Demonym: Eastlander
- Time zone: UTC-5 (EST)
  - Summer (DST): UTC-4 (EDT)
- Zip Code: 28205, 28212
- Area codes: 704, 980

Eastland (also known as Eastland-Wilora Lake or Wilora Lake) is a neighborhood in Charlotte, North Carolina, USA. The area is named after the former eponymous mall, that was demolished in 2014. Eastland is almost seven and a half miles from Uptown, Charlotte.

== Demographics ==
Historical population
Census	Pop.	Note	%±
2000	4,660		—
2010	5,781		24.1%
2015 (est.)	5,772		−0.2%

As of 2010, Eastland had a population of 5781. The racial makeup of the neighborhood was 44.1% Black or African American, 18.9% White American, 3.2% Asian American, and 2.7% of some other race. Hispanic or Latino American of any race were 31.2% of the population. The median household income for the area was $34,449.

== Transportation infrastructure ==
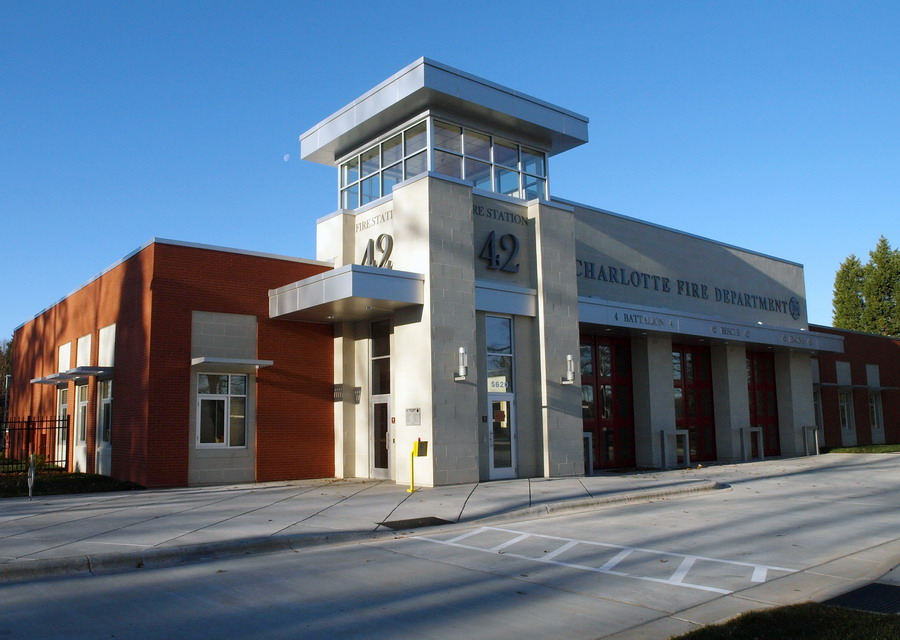
Charlotte Fire Station 42, located in Eastland

=== Mass transit ===
The following buses from the Charlotte Area Transit System (CATS) serve Eastland:

- #9 (Central Avenue)
- #29 (UNC Charlotte/Crosstown)
- #221 (E. Harris & Idlewild Rd)
- #222 (Pence Road)
- #232 (Grier Heights)

Eastland serves as a transit hub with the Eastland Community Transit Center, located in the same lot as the former Eastland Mall. Additionally, the site serves as a future terminus for the CityLYNX Gold Line streetcar, linking the future redevelopment of the previous site of the Eastland Mall with Uptown Charlotte.

=== Roads ===
The major thoroughfares in Eastland are Albemarle Road, Central Avenue, and North Sharon Amity. It is also near Independence Boulevard, giving direct access to Uptown Charlotte, Matthews, and Monroe.

=== Rail ===
Eastland is bordered by the Aberdeen, Carolina and Western Railway to the north, traveling between Charlotte to Aberdeen, North Carolina and Gulf, North Carolina.

== Education and libraries ==
=== School systems ===
Residents of Eastland attend Charlotte-Mecklenburg Schools, including Lawrence Orr Elementary, Windsor Park Elementary, Eastway Middle School, and Garinger High School. A new Charter School opened in Eastland, occupying the building that was once a Hannaford. The school would later close in January 2015, citing financial difficulties. In April 2016, the Charlotte-Mecklenburg School System purchased 11.4 acres of the former Eastland Mall site, for a future K-8 language immersion school that would also help relieve overcrowding at the nearby Albemarle Road Elementary and Albemarle Road Middle schools.

=== Libraries ===
Although there is no library branch located within the boundaries of Eastland, it is however served by the Independence Regional and Hickory Grove branches of the Public Library of Charlotte and Mecklenburg County, in the nearby neighborhoods of East Forest and Hickory Ridge, respectively.

== Sites of interest ==
- Neal Somers Alexander House is a Queen Anne Victoria estate house built in 1903. It was registered to the U.S. National Register of Historic Places in 2008.
- Campbell Creek Park. There are also future plans to link the park with the existing Upper McAlpine and Campbell Creek greenways.
- Kilborne Park is another nearby park located in the adjacent Windsor Park neighborhood.
- The Charlotte Open Air Market is located in the parking lot of the former Eastland Mall every weekend.
