= Samuel Copeland House =

Historic house in Massachusetts, United States

- U.S. National Register of Historic Places
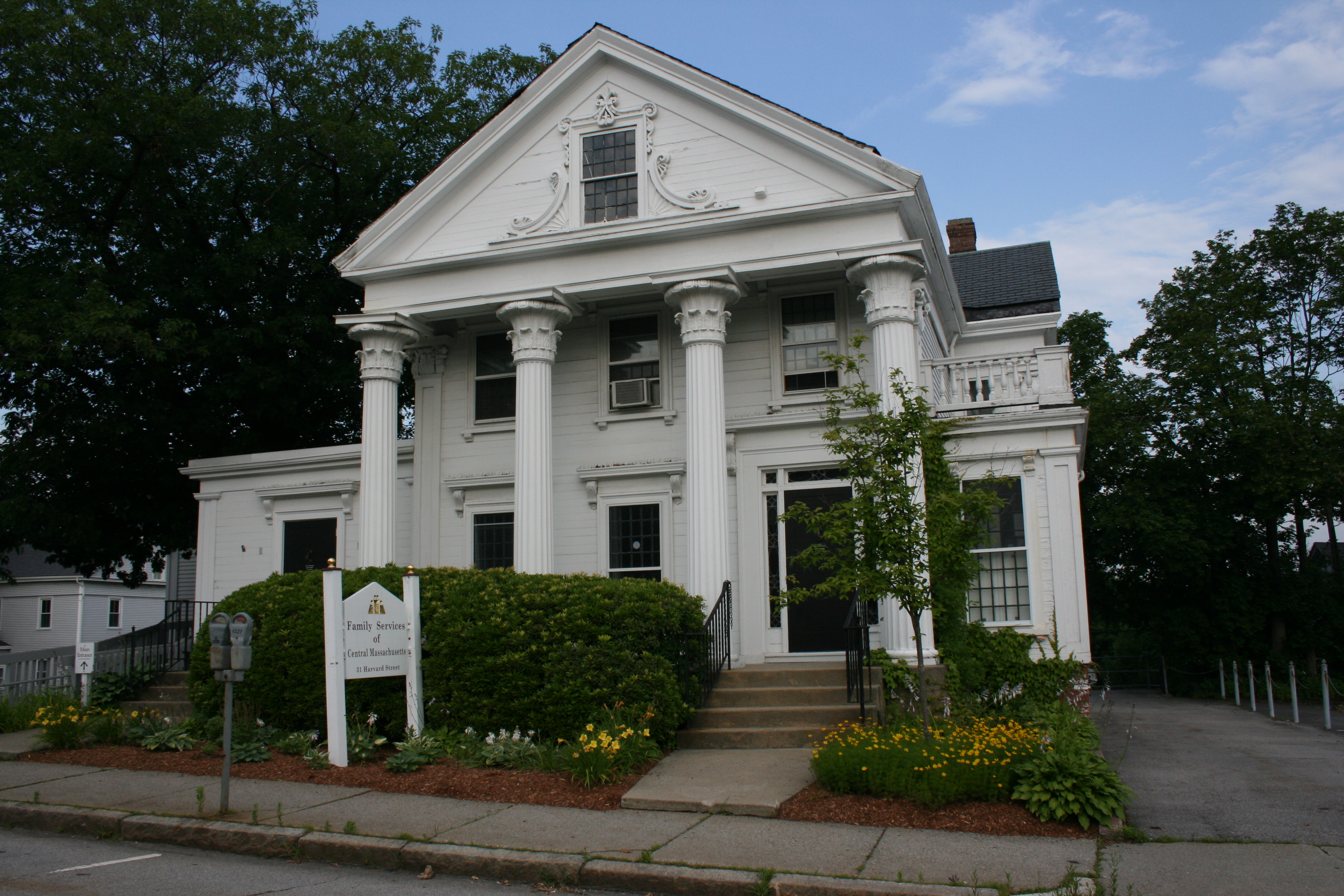

- Location within Massachusetts Location within the United States
- Location: 31 Harvard St., Worcester, Massachusetts
- Coordinates: 42°16′10″N 71°48′10″W
- Area: less than one acre
- Built: c. 1847
- Architectural style: Greek Revival
- MPS: Worcester MRA
- NRHP reference No.: 80000563
- Added to NRHP: March 05, 1980

The Samuel Copeland House is a historic house located at 31 Harvard Street in Worcester, Massachusetts. Built c. 1847, the elaborate Greek Revival house is one two in the city with a full temple front. The house was listed on the National Register of Historic Places on March 5, 1980.

== Description and history ==
The Samuel Copeland House is located on the northern fringe of downtown Worcester, on the west side of Harvard Street. It is a 2 1/2-story wood-frame structure, with a front-facing gabled roof and a clapboarded exterior. The building's facade has a full two-story portico supported by four fluted Corinthian columns. Its triangular full pedimented gable with window framed by foliate decoration. Other windows on the main facade are topped by molded caps on consoles. Building corners are adorned by pilasters. A later single-story ell extends to the left of the main block.

The house was built by Samuel Copeland, a toolmaker who eventually founded the Copeland Hardware Manufacturing Company in c. 1865. It is one of only two temple-fronted Greek Revival houses in the city (the other is the Arad Alexander House). Copeland, a native of Thompson, Connecticut, worked for several local manufacturers before establishing his own firm, and claimed credit for inventing the first iron planing machine. Copeland owned the house until about 1863; its subsequent owners included a druggist, merchant, and county treasurer.

== See also ==
- National Register of Historic Places listings in northwestern Worcester, Massachusetts
- National Register of Historic Places listings in Worcester County, Massachusetts
