= George Copeland House =

Historic house in Iowa, United States

- U.S. National Register of Historic Places
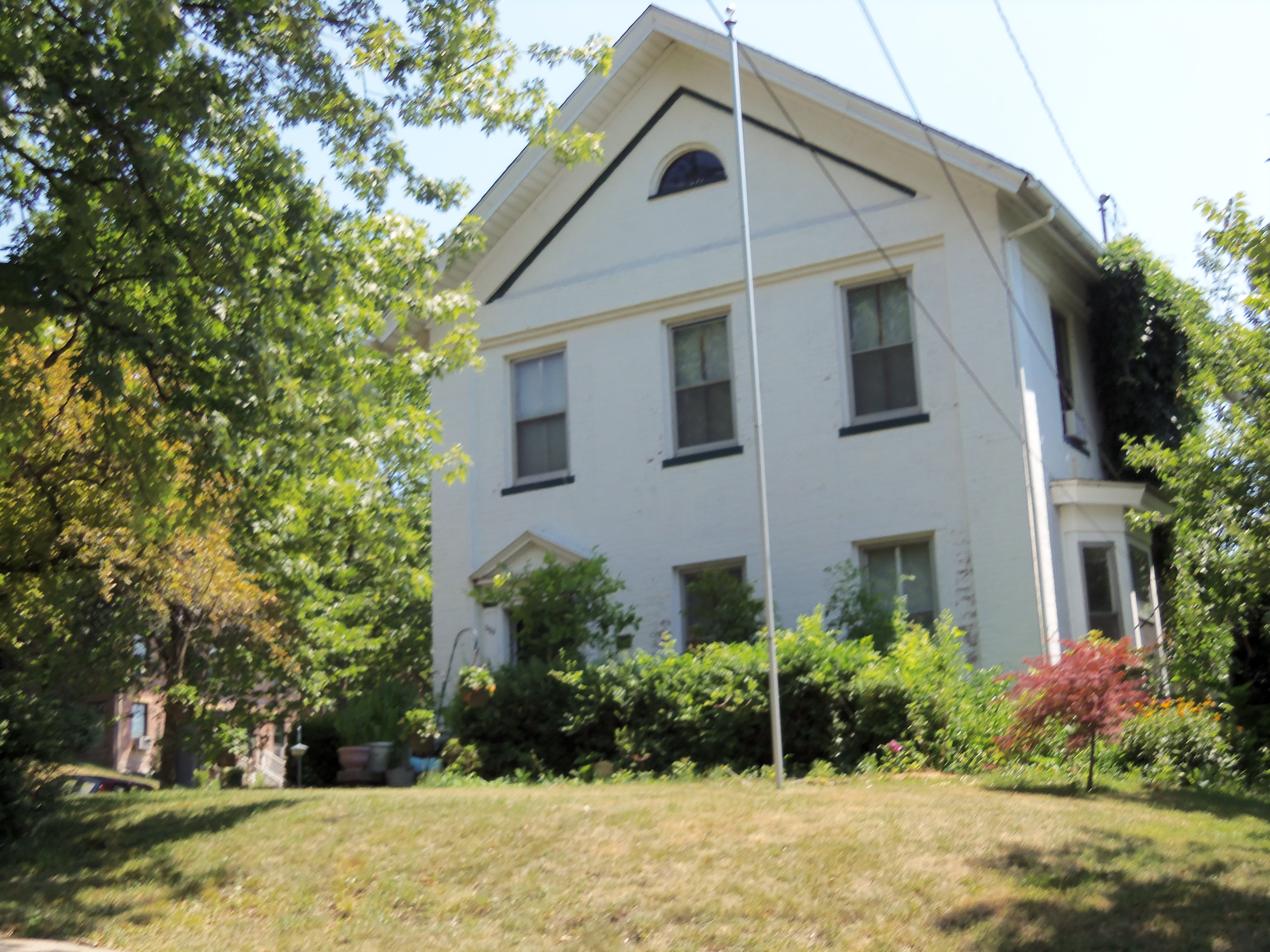
- George Copeland House

- Location within Iowa Location within the United States
- Location: 929 College Ave. Davenport, Iowa
- Coordinates: 41°31′54″N 90°33′22″W
- Area: less than one acre
- Built: c. 1875-1880
- Architectural style: McClelland Front-Gable
- MPS: Davenport MRA
- NRHP reference No.: 84001333
- Added to NRHP: July 27, 1984

The George Copeland House is a historic building located on the east side of Davenport, Iowa, United States. The residence has been listed on the National Register of Historic Places since 1984.

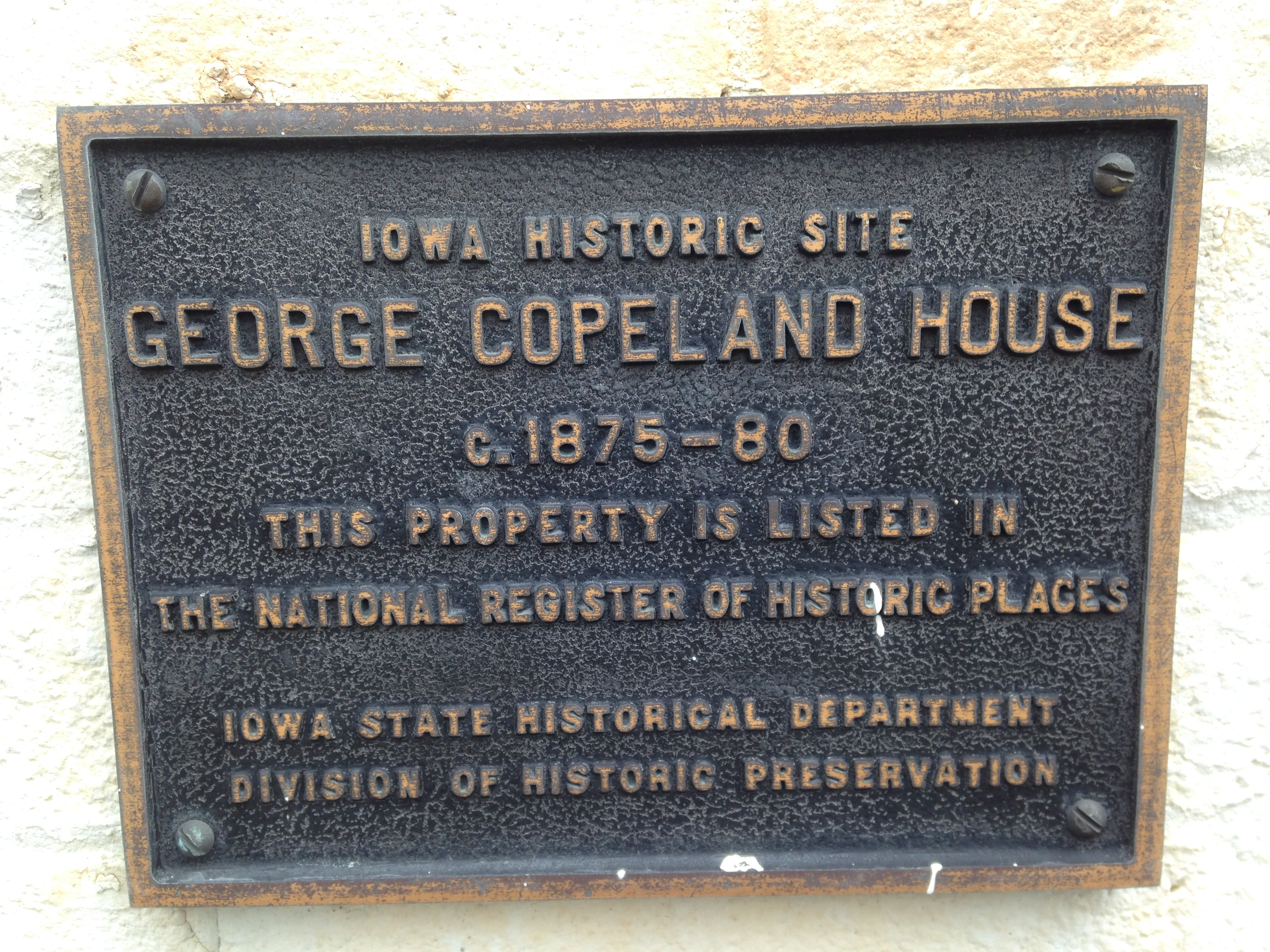
George Copeland House Historical Plaque

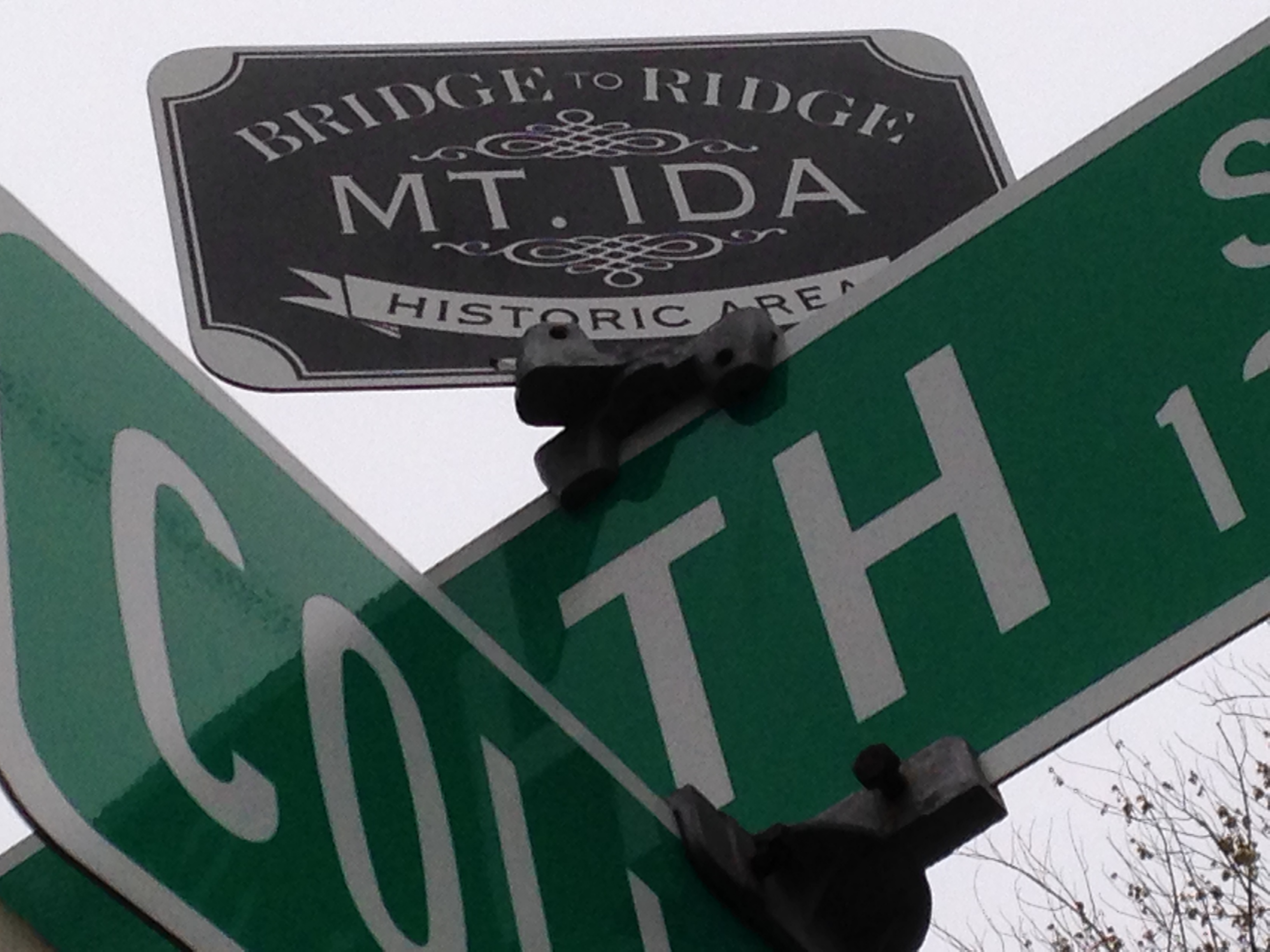
Mount Ida and Bridge to Ridge Historic Area Marker

== History ==
Copeland was born in Middlebury, Vermont, on May 28, 1857. In his early career, he was in the railroad industry and with the Internal Revenue Service. In 1884 he formed Copeland & Post which grew into a large life insurance practice with The Equitable of New York. Copeland & Post covered a large part of Illinois. He then worked as a general agent for the Northwestern Mutual Life Insurance Company in Davenport from January 1, 1886, to May 1, 1893. Copeland began living in this house in 1888, although it is believed to have been constructed earlier. Copeland was a member of the Davenport Academy of Sciences.

In 1893 Copeland went to Northwestern headquarters in Milwaukee, Wisconsin. On September 1, 1894, he became second assistant superintendent of agencies and then on January 9, 1903, was promoted to assistant superintendent of agencies. On June 13, 1916, he was elected superintendent. George E. Copeland died in 1927.

Today, the George Copeland House sits on the southeast corner of College Avenue and 10th Street near the Village of East Davenport. According to the 1892 Sanborn insurance map, today's 10th Street was previously 3rd Avenue. The Copeland House is in the Mount Ida historic area, part of the larger Bridge to Ridge historic area of Davenport.

== Architecture ==
The house is an unusual example of the two-story, three-bay, front gable form that is found in the older sections of the city. What differentiates it is the recessed wall panels of the main facade by applying corner piers. A pediment in the front gable end is created at the same time. This application gives the impression of the temple form of the Greek Revival style. It was a common feature that was used on 19th-century industrial buildings in Davenport, but it was rarely used on residential buildings of the same era.
