= Alexander House (Spartanburg, South Carolina) =

Historic house in South Carolina, United States

- U.S. National Register of Historic Places
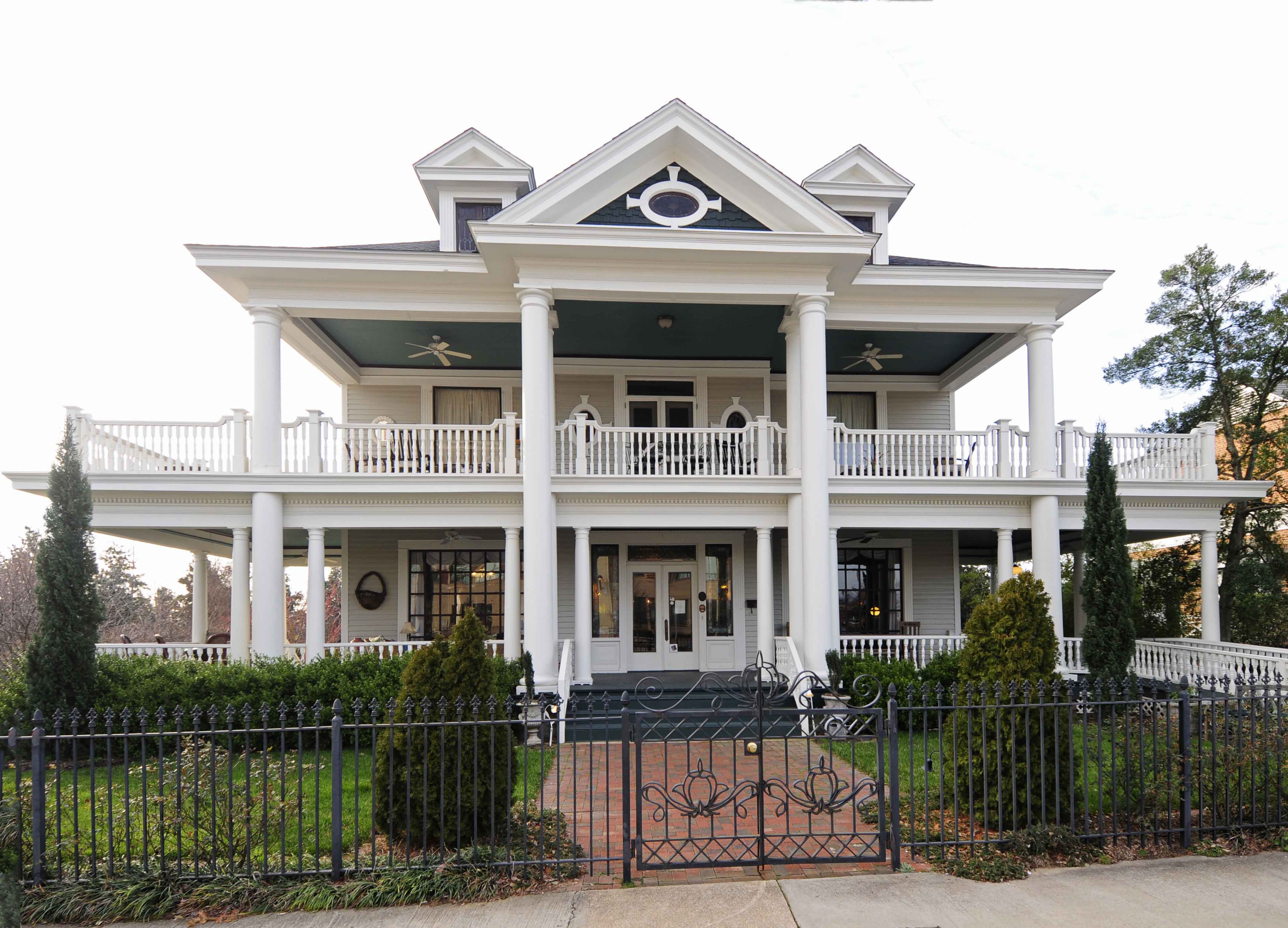
- Alexander House, February 2012

- Location within South Carolina Location within the United States
- Location: 319 E. Main Street, Spartanburg, South Carolina
- Coordinates: 34°57′3″N 81°55′28″W
- Area: less than one acre
- Built: 1904
- Architect: Epton, Leland P.; Keating, Thomas
- Architectural style: Classical Revival
- NRHP reference No.: 03000205
- Added to NRHP: April 11, 2003

Alexander House (also known as Alexander Music House) is a historic house located at 319 East Main Street in Spartanburg, Spartanburg County, South Carolina.

== Description and history ==
It was built in 1904 and is a two-story, wood-framed and weatherboard house in the Neo-Classical style. The front facade features a full-height entry porch with lower full-width porch. In 1969, the house was renovated and converted for use as a musical instruments store.

It was listed on the National Register of Historic Places on April 11, 2003.
