= USS Eastland =

US Navy attack transport

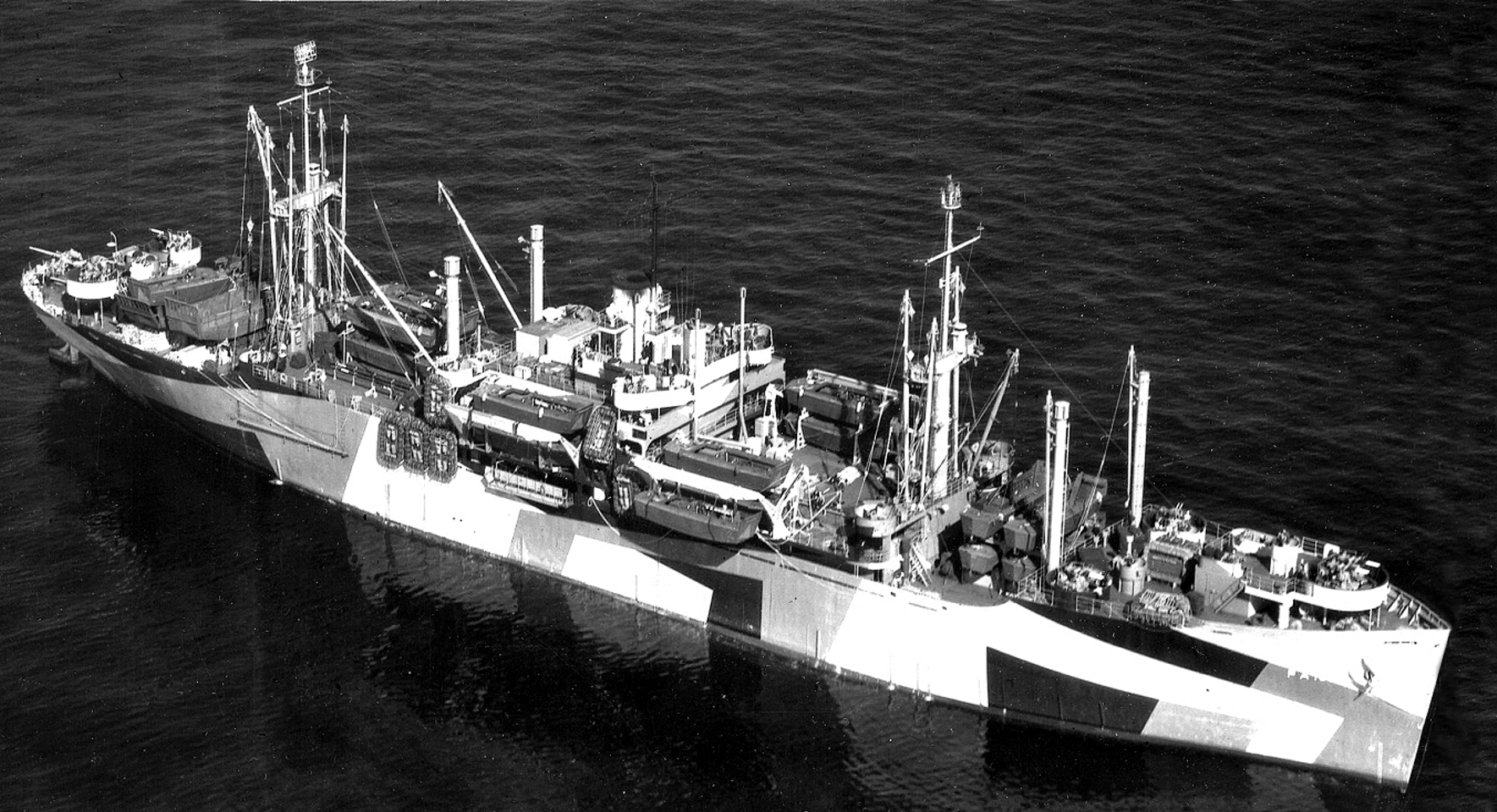

History

United States
- Name: USS Eastland
- Namesake: Eastland County, Texas
- Ordered: as type VC2-S-AP5; MCV hull 129
- Laid down: 4 July 1944
- Launched: 19 September 1944
- Acquired: 26 October 1944
- Commissioned: 26 October 1944
- Decommissioned: 15 April 1946
- Stricken: date unknown
- Fate: Scrapped, 1974

General characteristics
- Displacement: 12,450 tons (full load)
- Length: 455 ft 0 in (138.68 m)
- Beam: 62 ft 0 in (18.90 m)
- Draught: 24 ft 0 in (7.32 m)
- Speed: 19 knots
- Complement: 536
- Armament: one 5 in (130 mm) gun mount, twelve 40 mm gun mounts, ten 20 mm gun mounts

USS Eastland (APA-163) was a Haskell-class attack transport in service with the United States Navy from 1944 to 1946 She was scrapped in 1974.

== History ==
Eastland was launched 19 September 1944 by Oregon Shipbuilding Corp., Portland, Oregon, for the Maritime Commission; sponsored by Mrs. Allan Hunger; transferred to the Navy and commissioned 26 October 1944.

=== World War II ===
Eastland sailed from San Pedro, California, 26 December 1944, carrying 64 naval aviators to Pearl Harbor, where she arrived on New Year's Day 1945. She continued west on 17 January transporting men to Eniwetok, Kossol Roads, and Peleliu before arriving at Leyte, 9 February. After amphibious training, Eastland sailed from Leyte 21 March for Kerama Retto, the islands which proved the indispensable stepping stone and logistic base for invading and holding nearby Okinawa.

Arriving Kerama, 26 March, she landed her troops without opposition on Yakabi Shima and remained in the archipelago until 26 April. Several times during that period, Eastland fired on planes which attacked the anchorage; though not damaged herself, the transport splashed at least three enemy aircraft.

After a month at Ulithi, Eastland sailed into San Francisco Bay on 11 June 1945. She replenished her stores and embarked passengers and cargo at Eniwetok, Ulithi, San Pedro Bay and Leyte, from which she returned to the Golden Gate, 13 August.

She sailed again 24 August to carry replacement soldiers to San Pedro Bay, Leyte, arriving 14 September. After interisland transport duty until September, she put out for Hakodate, Japan, where she discharged occupation troops and their supplies from 4 to 7 October.

=== Operation Magic Carpet ===
Eastland continued on transport duty in the western Pacific Ocean, lifting U.S. Marines from Guam to Taku Bar, then reached Inchon to embark homeward-bound servicemen for Portland, Oregon, arriving in the Columbia River 2 December 1945. She made another such "Operation Magic Carpet" voyage between Seattle, Washington, and Yokosuka, Japan, from 17 December 1945 to 28 January 1946. Two days later, she sailed for San Francisco, California, and Norfolk, Virginia, arriving 24 February.

=== Decommissioning and fate ===
Eastland was decommissioned there 15 April 1946 and delivered to the War Shipping Administration the following day for disposal. She was sold for scrapping on 23 January 1974 to Consolidated Steel Corporation, Brownsville, Texas.

== Awards ==
Eastland received one battle star for World War II service at Okinawa.
