= William T. Alexander House =

Historic house in North Carolina, United States

- U.S. National Register of Historic Places
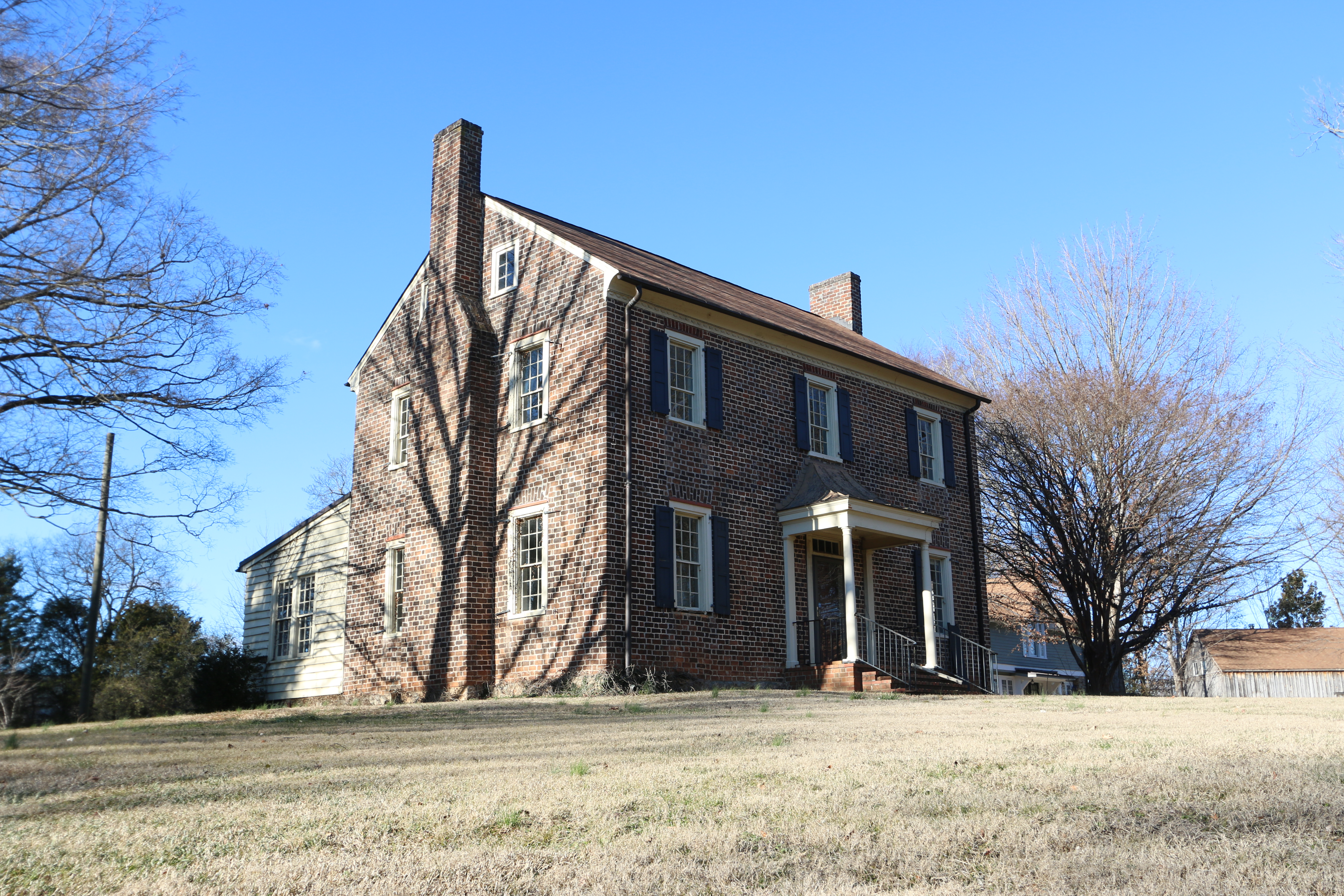
- The William T. Alexander House in early 2024

- Location within North Carolina Location within the United States
- Location: Mallard Cr. Church Rd., .1 mi W. of Jct. with US 29, near Charlotte, North Carolina
- Coordinates: 35°19′23″N 80°44′5″W
- Area: 4.7 acres (1.9 ha)
- Built: 1820–1830
- Architectural style: Federal, Georgian
- MPS: Mecklenburg County MPSMecklenburg County MPS
- NRHP reference No.: 02001718
- Added to NRHP: January 15, 2003

William T. Alexander House is a historic plantation house located near Charlotte, Mecklenburg County, North Carolina. It built between 1820 and 1830, and is a two-story, three-bay, brick dwelling with Federal and Georgian style design elements. It has a side-gable roof, sits on a granite foundation, and a center-bay porch added in the 1920s.

It was listed on the National Register of Historic Places in 2003.
