= Eastland High School =

Eastland High School may refer to:

- Eastland High School (Illinois)
- Eastland High School (Texas)
