= Eastland Center =

Eastland Center may refer to:

- Eastland Center (California), in West Covina, California
- Eastland Center (Michigan), in Harper Woods, Michigan

== See also ==
- Eastland Shopping Centre, in Ringwood, Victoria, Australia
- Eastlands Shopping Centre, in Rosny Park, Tasmania, Australia
- Eastland (disambiguation)
