= Neal Somers Alexander House =

Historic house in North Carolina, United States

- U.S. National Register of Historic Places
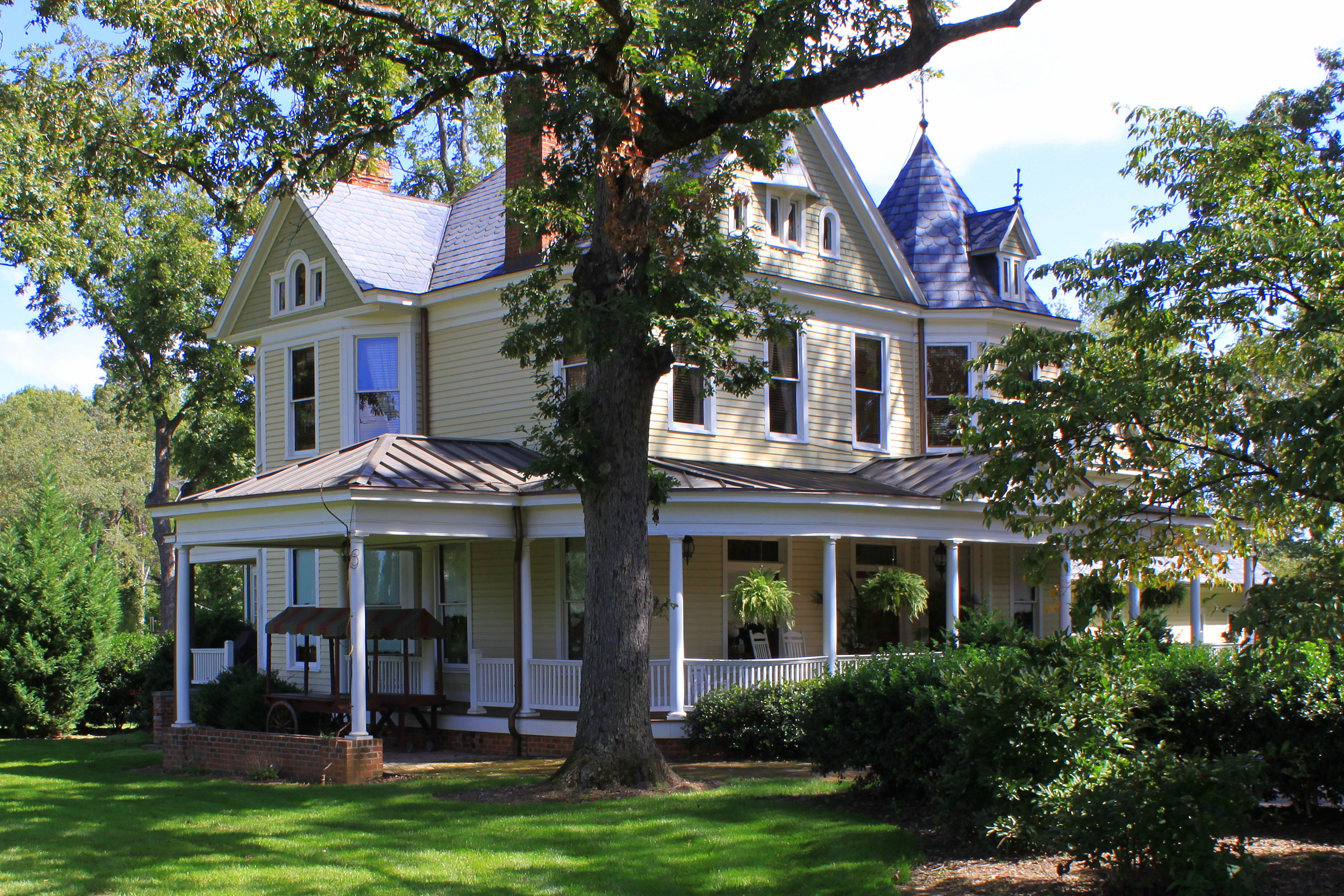

- Location within North Carolina Location within the United States
- Location: 5014 N. Sharon Amity Rd., near Charlotte, North Carolina
- Coordinates: 35°13′37″N 80°44′50″W
- Area: 4 acres (1.6 ha)
- Built: 1903
- Architectural style: Queen Anne, Colonial Revival
- MPS: Rural Mecklenburg County MPS
- NRHP reference No.: 08000381
- Added to NRHP: May 7, 2008

The Neal Somers Alexander House is a historic house located at 5014 North Sharon Amity Road near Charlotte, Mecklenburg County, North Carolina.

== Description and history ==
It was built in 1903, and is a 2 1/2-story, Queen Anne style frame dwelling with Colonial Revival style design elements. It has an asymmetrical form with projecting wings, a wraparound porch, patterned slate roof, Palladian window, and signature corner tower. It was built by Neal Somers Alexander (1855–1926) a wealthy farmer and the great-grandson of Hezekiah Alexander.

It was listed on the National Register of Historic Places on May 7, 2008.
