= Eastland, Lexington =

Eastland
- Neighborhood of Lexington, Kentucky
- Interactive map of Eastland
- Coordinates: 38.05°N 84.44°W
- Country: United States
- State: Kentucky
- County: Fayette
- City: Lexington

Area
  - Total: 1.59 sq mi (4.11 km^{2})

Population (2000)
  - Total: 4,659
  - Density: 2,936/sq mi (1,133.6/km^{2})
- Time zone: UTC-5 (Eastern (EST))
  - Summer (DST): UTC-4 (EDT)
- ZIP code: 40505
- Area code: 859

Eastland is a neighborhood in northeast Lexington, Kentucky, United States. Its boundaries are I-75 to the east, New Circle Road to the west, Winchester Road to the south, and abandoned railroad tracks to the north.

== Neighborhood statistics ==
- Area: 1.588 square miles (4.11 km^{2})
- Population: 4,659
- Population density: 2,933 people per square mile
- Median household income: $43,249
