= William D. Alexander House =

Historic house in Utah, United States

- U.S. National Register of Historic Places
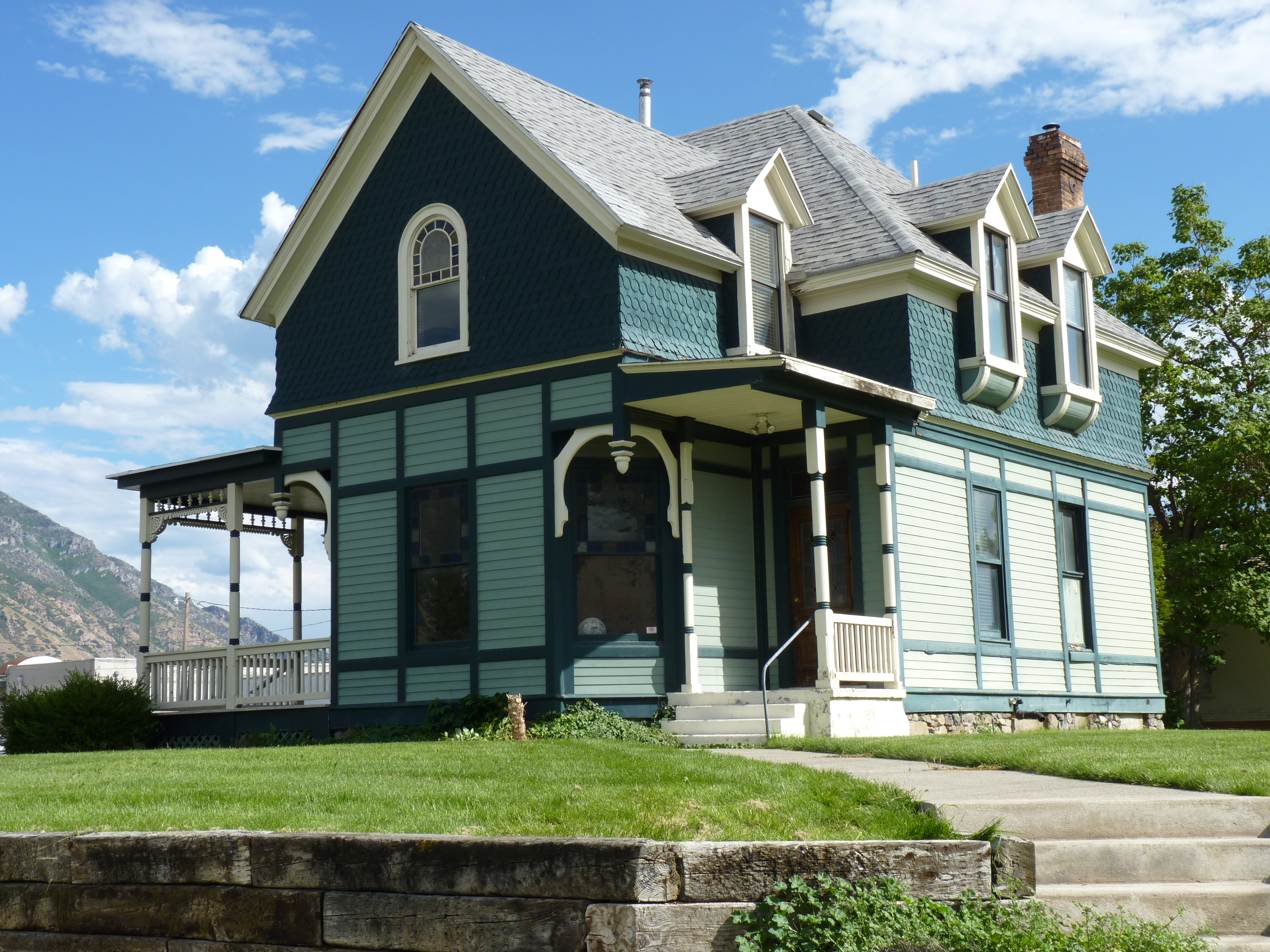
- William D. Alexander House

- Location within Utah Location within the United States
- Location: 91 W. 200 South; Provo, Utah
- Coordinates: 40°13′51″N 111°39′33″W
- Area: less than one acre
- Built: 1891
- Built by: William Alexander
- NRHP reference No.: 83003195
- Added to NRHP: 07/28/1983

The William D. Alexander House is a historic house located in Provo, Utah. It is listed on the National Register of Historic Places. It is asserted to be the only period example of Stick Style architecture in the state of Utah.

== William D. Alexander House * 91 West 200 South * Provo, Utah ==
The William D. Alexander House was built in 1891 by William Denton Alexander. This home is perhaps the only example of Stick Style architecture in Utah. "The overall design of the house integrates Eastlake porch details and Queen Anne wall shingling on the upper story with the dominant ground level Stick Style to form a complete, cohesive, architectural composition... The visual complexity of the house is further accentuated by the mixing of hip and gable roof forms, the use of projecting wall dormers, and the presence of clipped corners on the house body and wing (National Park Service p. 1)." The William D. Alexander House was designated to the Provo Historic Landmark registry on March 7, 1996.

=== The Stick Style ===
A turquoise blue, the William D. Alexander house is one of the most unusual homes in the city of Provo, Utah, and it is significant for more than Its color. The Alexander house emphasizes an architectural style known as "The stick style." An expression very popular in America throughout the nineteenth century, the Stick Style was an architectural expression which left the frame system of the home exposed. "The development of the balloon frame advanced the articulation of the structural skeleton and eventually the style became a conscious multiplication of sticks as decorative elements. The Alexander House demonstrates this decorative (more than structural) application, with horizontal and vertical sticks that frame the ground floor windows and doors, and the dormers of the second story. The geometric pattern of crossing horizontal and vertical sticks on this house is reminiscent of Japanese framing as seen in the 1876 Centennial Exhibition in Philadelphia which influenced the Stick and later Prairie styles, and may have been an influence in this house (Hartman p. 1)." The home is still very well preserved and stands strong today. The exterior has been repainted different colors over the years.

=== William Denton Alexander ===
Born on December 4, 1851, to Horace Martin Alexander and Catharine Houston, in Salt Lake City, Utah, William Denton Alexander came to Provo in the 1860s. In the year 1878 he was married to a woman by the name of Helena Coray. Due to her death he later remarried to Prudella Allman in 1906. Alexander was an influential man in the Provo area. A contractor and builder by trade, Alexander also served on the Provo City School Board, as a justice of the peace, and as a city councilman. Also active in the LDS church, William previously served as a missionary to the Hawaiian Islands from 1878 to 1881. The William Alexander House is currently occupied by Encircle, a 501(c)3 non-profit LGBTQ+ resource and community center for youth, parents, and queer adults.
