= Alexander Plantation House =

Historic house in Kentucky, United States

- U.S. National Register of Historic Places
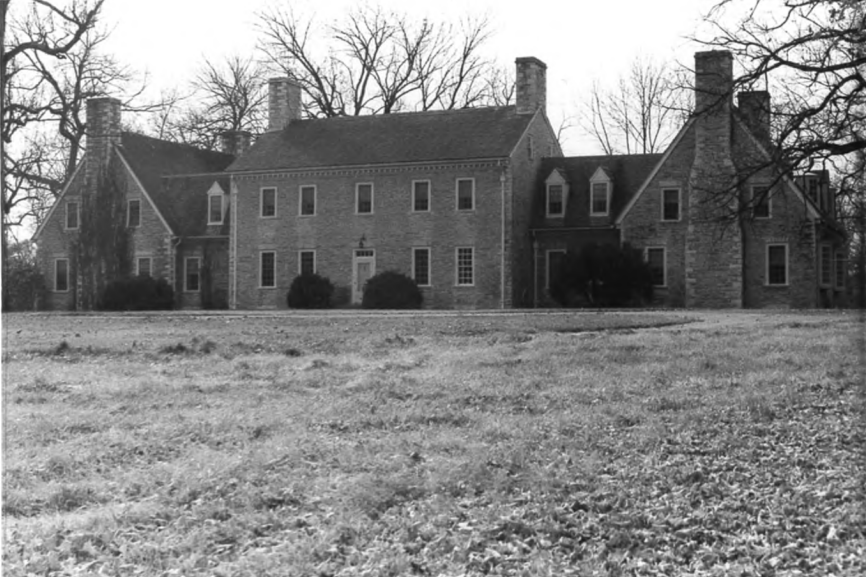

- Location within Kentucky Location within the United States
- Nearest city: Midway, Kentucky
- Coordinates: 38°8′45″N 84°44′29″W
- Area: 9 acres (3.6 ha)
- Architectural style: Federal
- MPS: Early Stone Buildings of Central Kentucky TR
- NRHP reference No.: 83002891
- Added to NRHP: June 23, 1983

Alexander Plantation House, also known as Lanark Farm, and Alexander's Plantation, is a former tobacco plantation and plantation house located near Midway in Woodford County, Kentucky.

It was listed on the National Register of Historic Places on June 23, 1983, for historical, architectural, and engineering significance. The house is a five-bay two-story central hall plan stone house. The house consists of two early stone houses, which were moved in c. 1935 –1936 about a mile to the current location.
