= Alexander and Busey Houses =

Historic houses in Montana, United States

- U.S. National Register of Historic Places
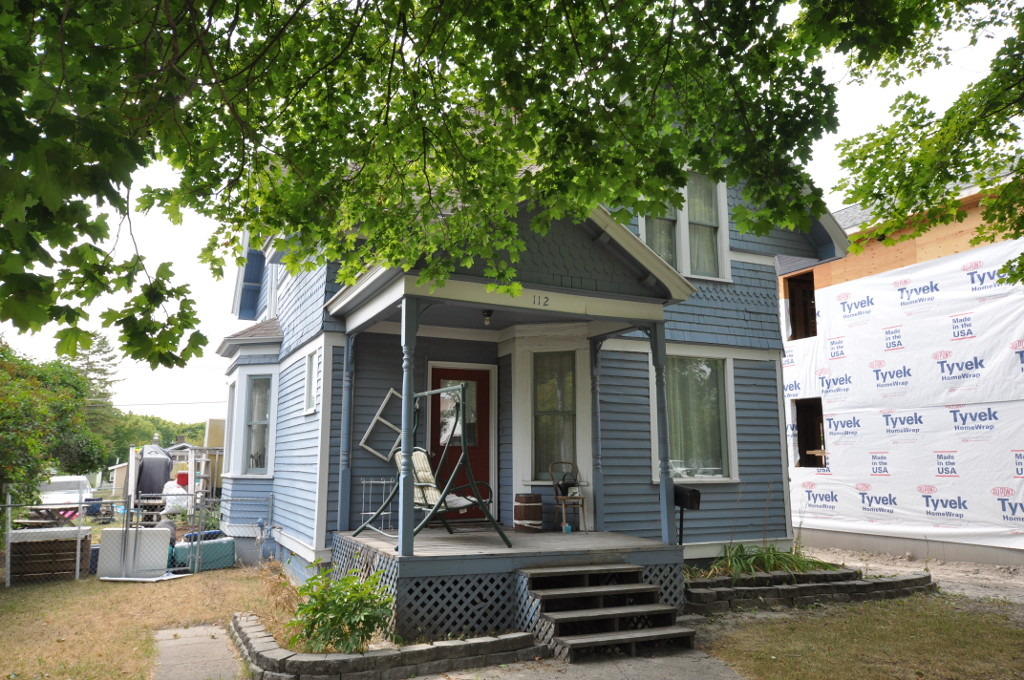
- Alexander House, at 112 5th Avenue. New house under construction at right in 2017 replaces the Busey House at 106.

- Location within Montana Location within the United States
- Location: 106 and 112 Fifth Ave. W., Kalispell, Montana
- Coordinates: 48°11′45″N 114°19′18″W
- Area: less than one acre
- Built: 1905
- Built by: Bader, Elmer
- Architectural style: Queen Anne
- MPS: Kalispell MPS
- NRHP reference No.: 94000869
- Added to NRHP: August 24, 1994

The Alexander and Busey Houses, located at 106 and 112 5th Avenue, West, in Kalispell, Montana, were listed on the National Register of Historic Places in 1994.

John Gus Thompson, a pitcher for the Pittsburgh Pirates in the first, 1903, World Series lived in the Alexander House in 1910.

The Busey House, at number 106, has been demolished and a replacement building on the site was under construction in 2017.
