= Dr. William S. Alexander House =

Historic house in Ohio, United States

- U.S. National Register of Historic Places
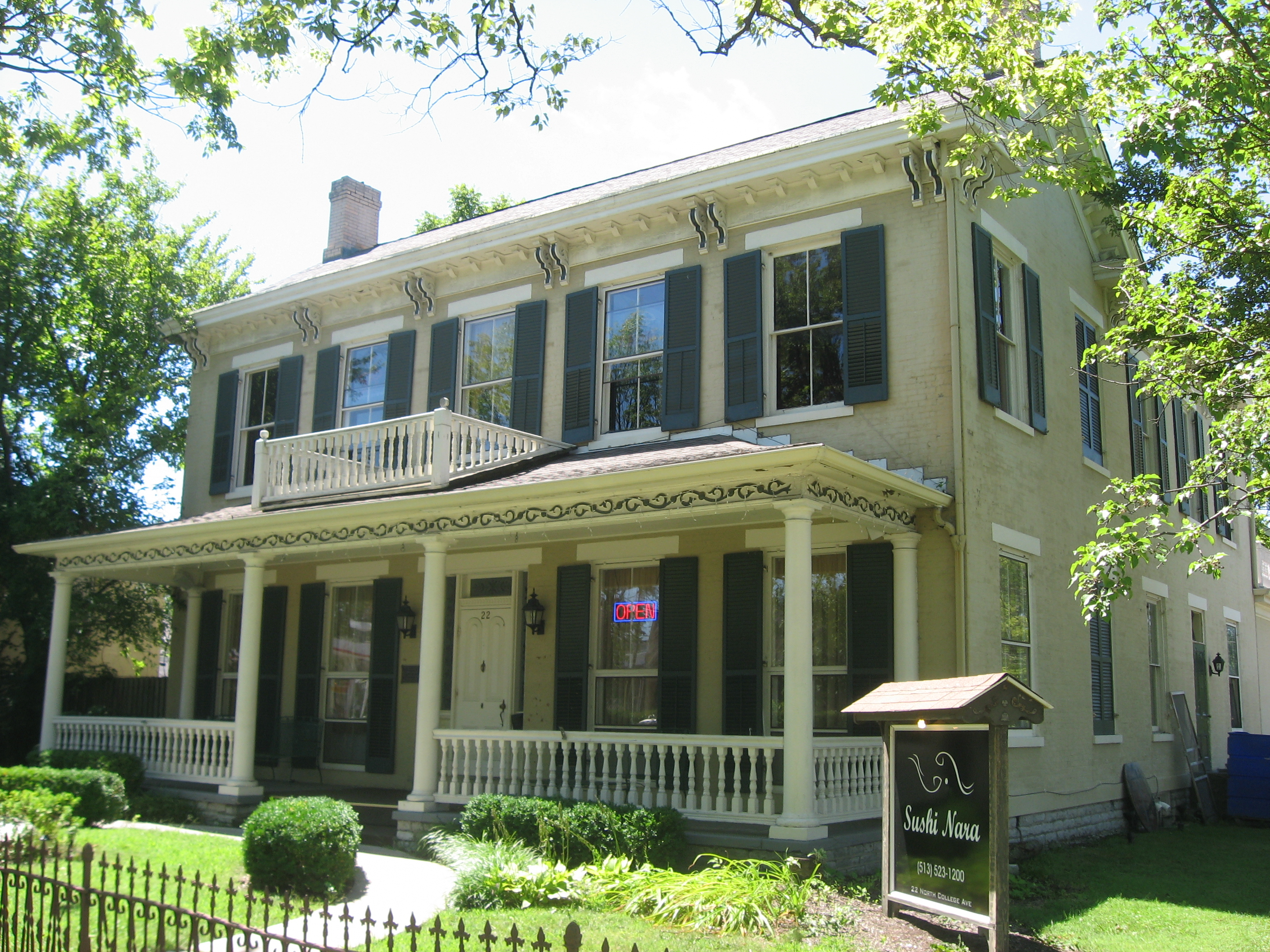
- Front and northern side of the house

- Location within Ohio Location within the United States
- Location: Oxford, Ohio
- Coordinates: 39°30′39.06″N 84°44′44.11″W
- Built: 1869
- Architectural style: Greek Revival and Italianate
- NRHP reference No.: 86003498
- Added to NRHP: 1987-03-18

Dr. William S. Alexander House, in Oxford, Ohio, was built in 1869 and was listed on the National Register of Historic Places in 1987.

The house was recognized as a good example of an I-house with transitional Greek Revival and Italianate elements. It has an unusual two-style side portico.

It is also significant for its association with two doctors, Dr. Herschel Hinkley and Dr. William S. Alexander, who assisted the town before hospitals and clinics were available, while also serving at Miami University, and who represent "town-gown" relations.

The house was later used as a bed and breakfast, and in 2010 it was in use as a Japanese restaurant.
