= Western North Carolina Annual Conference =

The Western North Carolina Conference is an Annual Conference (regional episcopal area, similar to a diocese) of the United Methodist Church. This conference serves the western half of the state of North Carolina, with its administrative offices and the office of the bishop being located in Huntersville, North Carolina. It is part of the Southeastern Jurisdictional Conference.

The current presiding Bishop is Bishop Kenneth H Carter.

== Higher education support ==
The Western North Carolina Conference provides funding to five institutions of higher learning:

- Bennett College – Greensboro, North Carolina
- Brevard College – Brevard, North Carolina
- Greensboro College – Greensboro, North Carolina
- High Point University – High Point, North Carolina
- Pfeiffer University
  - Main Campus – Misenheimer, North Carolina
  - Extension Campus – Charlotte, North Carolina

== Districts ==
The WNC Annual Conference is further subdivided into eight smaller regions, called "districts," which provide further administrative functions for the operation of local churches in cooperation with each other. This structure is vital to Methodism, and is referred to as connectionalism. The districts that comprise the Western North Carolina Conference are:

- Appalachian
- Blue Ridge
- Catawba Valley
- Metro
- Northern Piedmont
- Smoky Mountain
- Uwharrie
- Yadkin Valley

Prior to July 2012, the WNC Annual Conference had 15 districts.

- Albemarle
- Asheville
- Charlotte
- Gastonia
- Greensboro
- High Point
- Lake Norman
- Lexington
- Marion
- Northeast
- North Wilkesboro
- Salisbury
- Statesville
- Waynesville
- Winston-Salem

== See also ==
Annual Conferences of the United Methodist Church
