= 1774 Alexander Rock House =

Historic house in North Carolina, United States

- Hezekiah Alexander House
- U.S. National Register of Historic Places
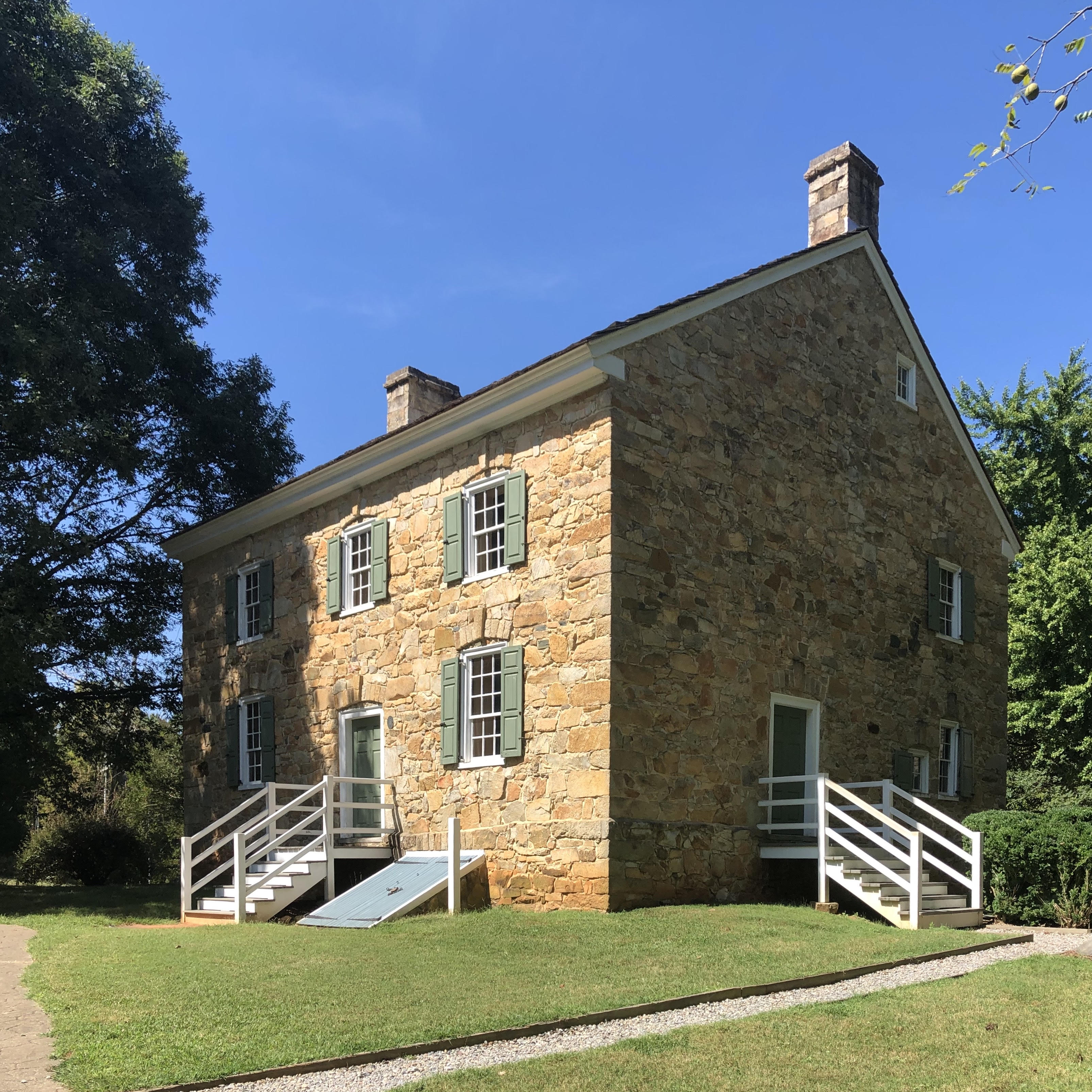
- Alexander Rock House, Fall of 2019

- Location within North Carolina Location within the United States
- Location: 3500 Shamrock Drive, Charlotte, North Carolina
- Coordinates: 35°13′55″N 80°46′00″W
- Area: 8.3 acres (3.4 ha)
- Built: 1774
- NRHP reference No.: 70000461
- Added to NRHP: April 17, 1970

The 1774 Alexander Rock House in Charlotte, North Carolina, US, is the oldest house in Mecklenburg County and was added to the National Register of Historic Places in 1970. Originally built by the Alexander Family who finished construction in 1774, the Rock House and its various outbuildings have had many owners over the years with The Charlotte Museum of History being its steward today.

== History ==
Hezekiah Alexander (~1728–1801), bought more than 600 acres (243 ha) on Sugar Creek in 1767 and finished building the Rock House in 1774. Originally from Cecil County, Maryland, he moved to Pennsylvania, then to Delaware, and finally North Carolina. He worked as a blacksmith and a farmer, was a member of the Fifth Provincial Congress which wrote North Carolina's first constitution and was a trustee of Queens College (which should not be confused with the present-day Queens University of Charlotte.)

After Hezekiah's death, the homesite passed to his wife Mary Sample Alexander (1734-1805). She never remarried and thus the land was divided between her youngest sons, Joel and Oswald, after her death. In addition to the land, Oswald also received the Rock House and outbuildings.

In 1826, Oswald married Mary Moore only to die suddenly and without a will before the year's end. After his death, she filled a petition for and ultimately received the estate including the Rock House in 1828. She married William Lucky the same year and, because of how property law worked at the time, the house then passed from her to Lucky and out of the Alexander Family.

William and Mary had three children, Dorcus, William and Catherine, who all received portions of the land when William died without a will in 1845. Mary was also given a portion of the land but was not given the house, which went to Dorcus. Dorcus married and moved to South Carolina in 1852, leaving the property to her uncle, John W. Moore, who sold it to Joseph W. Cadwell in late 1858.

Dr. Joseph Cadwell lived in the Rock House for two years until his death at age 28 in 1861. His brother, Samuel Cadwell, inherited the property and moved in with his parents and younger sister. After living there for 22 years, he sold the property to Adam Yandle in March 1883.

Yandle bought the house paying mostly upfront and promising the rest in January the following year. Knowing he would not be able to pay by the deadline, he mortgaged his home to Victor Barringer in order to pay Samuel Cadwell. This second loan went equally as well as the first and, in 1888, Barringer took the property and sold it at auction to Joseph Reid in 1890.
Joseph Reid and his wife Rachel renovated the house several times including adding a large front porch and replacing the flooring on the ground level. He died in 1913 without any children so the house went to Rachel who died 15 years later in 1928 without ever remarrying, so the house passed to the control of their estate who put it up for sale.

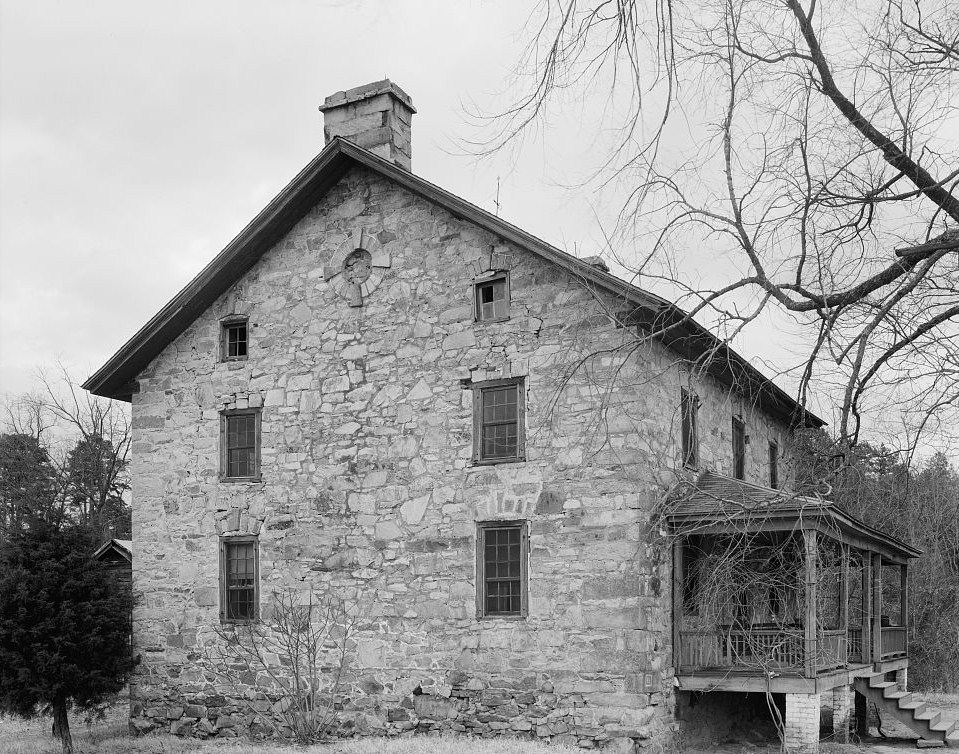
Alexander Rock House, 1936

=== Museum ===
In 1943, Eugene Cole donated the house to the Western North Carolina Annual Conference of the Methodist Church which had plans to use the site as a retirement community. In 1949, the home and some of the surrounding property was leased by members of the Daughters of the American Revolution in order to preserve and restore the historic building. The Hezekiah Alexander Home Foundation was formed in 1969 to better manage the property and to fundraise for further work. After passing through several hands, The Charlotte Museum of History became independent in 1986 and maintains the Rock House to this day.

== Architecture ==
The stone house was built in a Georgian style typical of those built by Germans who settled in Pennsylvania and by the Dutch in the Hudson Valley. Germans who moved south to North Carolina brought this style of architecture with them. The Alexander House is one of the few examples of this architecture still in existence.
