= Arad Alexander House =

Historic house in Massachusetts, United States

- U.S. National Register of Historic Places
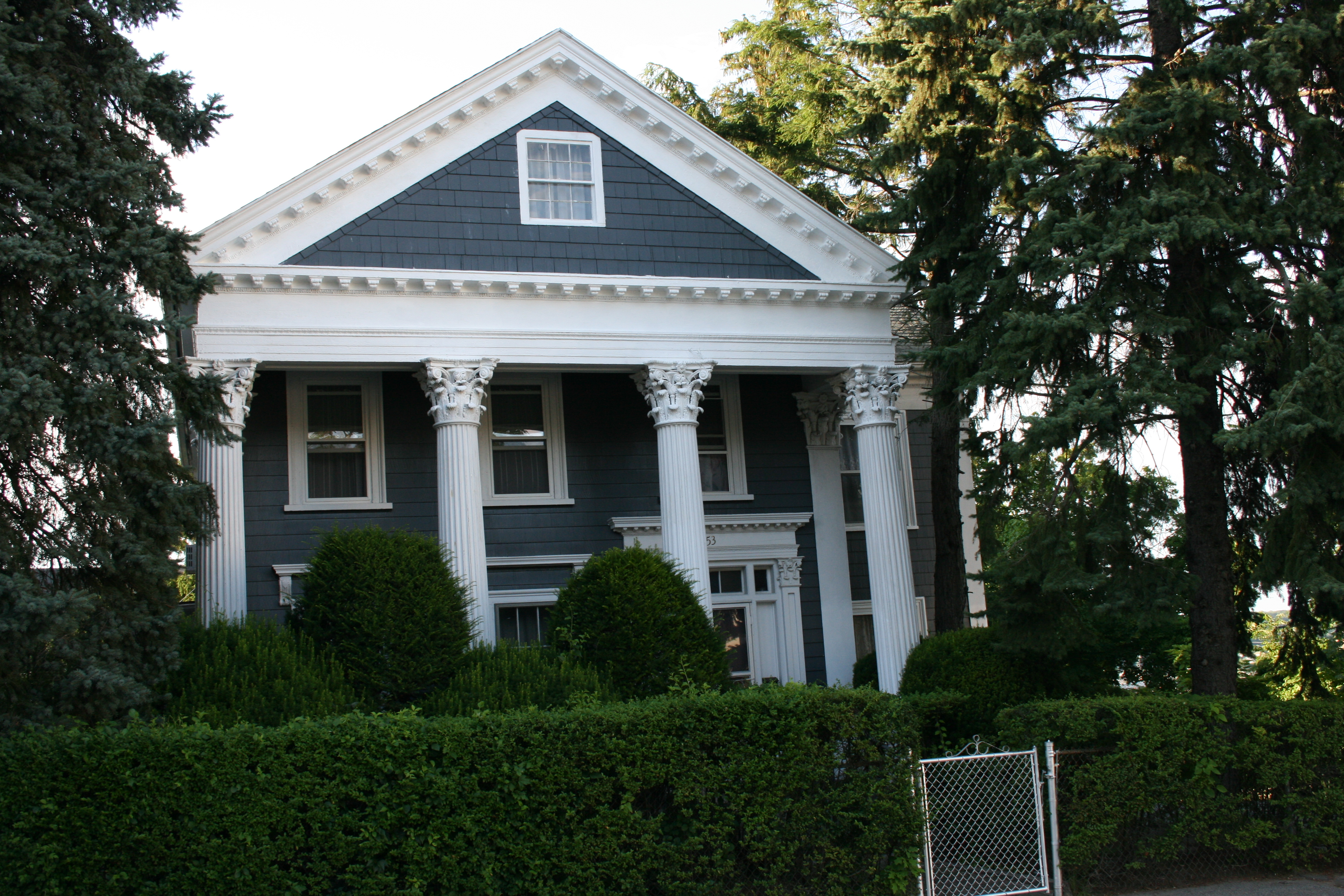

- Location within Massachusetts Location within the United States
- Location: 53 Waverly St., Worcester, Massachusetts
- Coordinates: 42°15′24″N 71°47′33″W
- Area: less than one acre
- Built: 1845
- Architectural style: Greek Revival
- MPS: Worcester MRA
- NRHP reference No.: 80000544
- Added to NRHP: March 05, 1980

The Arad Alexander House is a historic house at 53 Waverly Street in Worcester, Massachusetts. Built about 1845 and moved in the 1860s, it is one of the city's most elaborate Greek Revival residences, and may have been designed by prominent local architect Elias Carter. It was listed on the National Register of Historic Places on March 5, 1980.

== Description and history ==
The Arad Alexander House stands in a densely built residential area southeast of downtown Worcester, on the north side of Waverly Street between Providence and Coral Streets. It is a two-story wood-frame structure, with a front gable roof. Its main block follows a side hall plan, and the front facade is a full temple front, with Corinthian columns supporting a full entablature and triangular pediment adorned with modillion blocks. The front windows are topped by moulding with consoles and hoods. The main entrance has an elaborate Corinthian surround with sidelight and transom windows beneath a corniced entablature.

The house was built c. 1845, and is one of Worcester's most elaborate Greek Revival houses. Its original location and builder are unknown (although the later may be the locally prominent Elias Carter, based on stylistic evidence) but believed to be closer to the downtown area. The house was moved to its present location in the 1860s by Arad Alexander. Later owners subdivided the house into multiple units. One of its prominent 20th-century residents was Samuel Fine, who adjudicated disputes within the city's Jewish community.

== See also ==
- National Register of Historic Places listings in eastern Worcester, Massachusetts
