= List of Lafayette College people =

This is a list of notable people affiliated with Lafayette College in Easton, Pennsylvania.

== Notable alumni and trustees ==
William C. Cattell, president of Lafayette College from 1863 to 1883

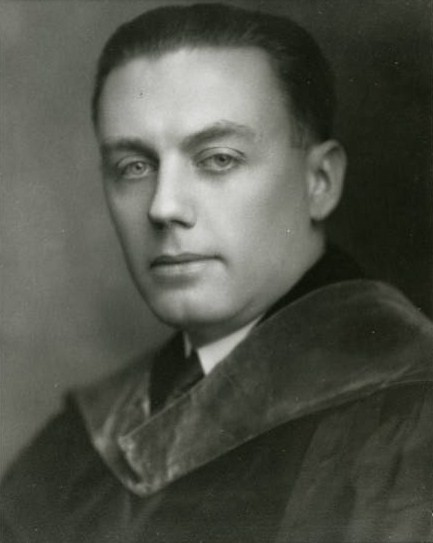
Ralph Cooper Hutchison, president of Lafayette College from 1945 to 1958

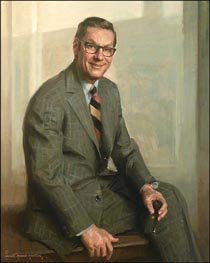
William E. Simon, class of 1952, served as the United States secretary of the treasury from 1974 to 1977.

Fred Morgan Kirby, trustee from 1916 to 1940, provided funds to establish a Professorship of Civil Rights.

=== Academics and education ===
- George C. Heckman, class of 1845, president of Hanover College, 1870–79
- Thomas Craig, class of 1875, early professor of mathematics at Johns Hopkins University
- James Bright, class of 1877, philologist, first person to receive a Ph.D. in English from Johns Hopkins
- James Cameron Mackenzie, class of 1878, educator
- James McKeen Cattell, class of 1880, first professor of psychology in the United States
- Earl Gregg Swem, class of 1893, historian, bibliographer and librarian
- Joseph S. Illick, class of 1907, dean of the New York State College of Forestry, 1944–51
- Ralph Cooper Hutchison, class of 1918, president of Washington & Jefferson College, 1931–45, and Lafayette College, 1945–57
- Frank Reed Horton, class of 1926, founder of the Alpha Phi Omega fraternity
- Nils Yngve Wessell, class of 1934, president of Tufts University, 1953–66
- Leonard Jeffries, class of 1959, professor of Black Studies at the City College of New York (City)
- Martin Jezer, class of 1961, progressive activist in New York and Vermont; leader of stutterers' self-help movement
- Barry Wellman, class of 1963, professor of Sociology, University of Toronto, 1967–2013; co-director, NetLab Network
- Joseph Rallo, class of 1971, commissioner of Higher Education for the State of Louisiana
- John Anderson Fry, class of 1982, former president of Drexel University and current president of Temple University
- James J. Winebrake, class of 1989, president of Coastal Carolina University, 2025–present

=== Business ===
- Ario Pardee, trustee from 1865 to 1892, president of the trustees, 1881–92; coal magnate and philanthropist who donated the funds to create the engineering and science departments at Lafayette, namesake of Pardee Hall, which he also funded
- James Gayley, class of 1876, managing director of Carnegie Steel Company and first vice president of U.S. Steel, 1901–09
- Torrence Huffman, class of 1878, banker; loaned the Huffman Prairie to the Wright Brothers
- Charles Bergstresser, class of 1881, one of the three founders of Dow Jones & Company
- Harrison Woodhull Crosby, commercialized the canned tomato
- Leslie Freeman Gates, class of 1897, president of the Chicago Board of Trade, 1919–20
- George B. Walbridge, class of 1898, co-founder and chairman of Walbridge Aldinger (now known as simply Walbridge)
- Fred Morgan Kirby, trustee from 1916 to 1940, helped found the Woolworth's five and dime store chain
- Thomas J. Watson, trustee; donor; first chairman and CEO of IBM, 1914–56; computing pioneer; namesake of the Watson Computer
- Sarkis Acopian, class of 1951, founded Acopian Technical Company, makers of the first solar radios
- Michael H. Moskow, class of 1959, CEO and president of the Federal Reserve Bank of Chicago
- Stephen D. Pryor, class of 1971, president of ExxonMobil Chemical Company
- Neil Levin, class of 1976, former executive director of the Port Authority of New York and New Jersey, vice president of Goldman Sachs
- Fran Horowitz, class of 1985, president and chief merchandising officer of Abercrombie & Fitch Co.
- Alan Hoffman, class of 1988, senior vice president, PepsiCo.; former deputy chief of staff to Vice President Joe Biden; deputy assistant to the U.S. president
- Stephen Messer, class of 1993, founder of Rakuten Linkshare and angel investor
- Will Johnson, class of 2002, business executive

=== Engineering ===
- William Ashburner Cattell, class of 1884, civil engineer and railroad company president
- James Madison Porter III, class of 1886, professor of civil engineering and designer of Northampton Street Bridge
- William F. Durand, class of 1888, mechanical engineer and first civilian chair of the National Advisory Committee for Aeronautics
- Edgar Jadwin, class of 1888, general, chief of engineers
- Don Lancaster, class of 1961, author, inventor, and microcomputer pioneer

=== Entertainment ===
- Burr McIntosh, class of 1884, actor, author, and photographer
- Joel Silver, head of Hollywood's Silver Pictures and producer of films including the Die Hard, Lethal Weapon, and The Matrix series
- Lorene Scafaria, screenwriter, playwright, actress and singer best known for her work on the 2008 film Nick and Norah's Infinite Playlist
- Jim Rosenhaus, class of 1986, broadcaster for the Cleveland Indians
- Beth Mowins, class of 1989, ESPN announcer and one of the first women color analysts on the network

=== Government ===
- Charles F. Chidsey, class of 1864, first mayor of Easton, member of the Pennsylvania House of Representatives
- Isaiah D. Clawson, class of 1833, represented New Jersey's 1st congressional district in the United States House of Representatives, 1855–59
- James Morrison Harris, class of 1833, U.S. representative from Maryland, 1855–61; Lafayette College trustee, 1865–72
- Alexander Ramsey, class of 1836, governor of Minnesota, U.S. senator, congressman, secretary of war
- Nathaniel B. Smithers, class of 1836, U.S. representative from Delaware, 1863–65
- Philip Johnson, class of 1844, U.S. representative from Pennsylvania, 1861–63, 1863–67
- Henry Clay Longnecker, class of 1845 (non-graduate), honorary degree in 1851, U.S. representative from Pennsylvania, 1859–61
- Henry Green, class of 1846, chief justice, Supreme Court of Pennsylvania
- Henry Martyn Hoyt, attended 1845–48, honorary law degree conferred in 1882, governor of Pennsylvania, 1879–83
- Horatio Gates Fisher, class of 1855, U.S. representative from Pennsylvania, 1879–83
- Samuel McLean, non-graduate, received honorary degree in 1857, member of first Montana State Legislature, 1865–67
- Benjamin Franklin Junkin, entered 1837, A.M. in 1865, U.S. representative from Pennsylvania, 1859–61
- Robert Porter Allen, class of 1855, Pennsylvania state senator, 1875–78
- Allen Craig, class of 1855, Pennsylvania state representative and senator, 1865–67, 1879–82
- John W. Griggs, class of 1868, governor of New Jersey, 1896–1898; U.S. attorney general, 1898–1901
- Frank J. Washabaugh, class of 1870, South Dakota jurist and legislator
- Laird Howard Barber, class of 1871, U.S. representative from Pennsylvania 1899–1901, lawyer
- Arthur Granville Dewalt, class of 1874, U.S. representative from Pennsylvania, 1915–21
- Isaac Barber, class of 1876, New Jersey state senator 1896–99, 1902–05
- Russell Benjamin Harrison, class of 1877, Indiana legislator; consul to Portugal and Mexico; son of U.S. President Benjamin Harrison
- Edward Francis Blewitt, class of 1879, Pennsylvania state senator, 1907–10; great-grandfather to Joe Biden
- George Howell, class of 1880, U.S. representative from Pennsylvania, 1903–1904
- John R. Farr, class of 1885, U.S. representative from Pennsylvania, 1911–19 and 1921
- Cyrus E. Woods, class of 1886, president pro tempore Pennsylvania State Senate 1901–07; U.S. ambassador to Spain and Japan, 1921–24
- Wallace McCamant, class of 1888, judge, U.S. Court of Appeals for the Ninth Circuit, 1925–26
- Harry Arista Mackey, class of 1890, mayor of Philadelphia 1928–31
- Frederic Antes Godcharles, class of 1893, Pennsylvania state representative and senator, 1900–08
- Isaac Clinton Kline, class of 1893, U.S. representative from Pennsylvania, 1921–23, lawyer
- A. Mitchell Palmer, attended briefly and honorary degree conferred in 1919, 50th U.S. attorney general, overseer of the Palmer Raids
- John D. Clarke, class of 1898, U.S. congressman from New York
- William Huntington Kirkpatrick, class of 1905, U.S. representative from Pennsylvania 1921–23
- Joseph F. Crater, class of 1910, associate justice of the New York Supreme Court
- Haydn Proctor, class of 1926, associate justice of the Supreme Court of New Jersey
- Wesley Lance, class of 1928, member of New Jersey General Assembly and New Jersey Senate; one of the drafters of the current, 1947 New Jersey State Constitution
- Robert B. Meyner, class of 1930, governor of New Jersey 1954–62; competed against John F. Kennedy in the 1960 Democratic Party primary
- Winston L. Prouty, class of 1930, U.S. representative and senator from Vermont
- William H. Woodin, Trustee, U.S. secretary of the treasury, 1933
- Wayne Dumont, class of 1935, former acting governor of New Jersey
- Wendell Good, class of 1935, Pennsylvania state representative 1967–72
- Charles Timothy Slack, class of 1935, Pennsylvania state representative 1961–70
- Arch A. Moore Jr., attended in 1943, twice governor of West Virginia
- Arthur Sohmer, class of 1948, chief of staff to former Vice President Spiro Agnew
- D. Bennett Mazur (c. 1925–1994), member of the New Jersey General Assembly
- Fred Ashton, class of 1952, mayor of Easton 1967–1975
- Dennis Kux, class of 1952, U.S. ambassador to Côte d'Ivoire, 1986–89
- William E. Simon, class of 1952, 63rd secretary of the treasury, president of the United States Olympic Committee
- Bob Smith, class of 1952, former senator of New Hampshire
- Garrett E. Brown Jr., class of 1965, chief judge of the United States District Court for the District of New Jersey
- George F. Pott Jr., class of 1965, Pennsylvania state representative 1977–86
- Robert Pastor, class of 1969, former member of the United States National Security Council
- Joel A. Pisano, class of 1971, U.S. district judge of the United States District Court for the District of New Jersey 2000–2015; U.S. magistrate judge of the same court 1991–2000
- Marcia Bernicat, class of 1975, U.S. ambassador to Bangladesh
- Robin L. Wiessmann, class of 1975, former Pennsylvania state treasurer
- Craig Dally, class of 1978, Pennsylvania state representative, 1997–2010
- Bruce L. Castor Jr., class of 1983, attorney general (interim) and first solicitor general of Pennsylvania, former district attorney and county commissioner in Montgomery County, Pennsylvania; presidential impeachment counsel; lawyer
- Doug Reichley, class of 1983, Pennsylvania state representative 2003–12
- Robert Spagnoletti, class of 1984, former Attorney General for the District of Columbia
- Michael A. Raynor, class of 1984, former U.S. ambassador to Benin
- Frank Gaziano, class of 1986, associate justice, Massachusetts Supreme Judicial Court, 2016–present
- Anthony Palumbo, class of 1994, member New York State Assembly, 2013–present
- Aaron Kaufer, class of 2011, Pennsylvania state representative, 2015–present
- Travis Hutson, class of 2007, Florida state senator 2012–present

=== Arts, humanities, and social sciences ===
- J. Elfreth Watkins Sr., class of 1874, curator of United States National Museum
- Frederick Starr, class of 1882, anthropologist
- Edwin Atlee Barber, classes of 1887 and 1893, director of Pennsylvania Museum and School of Industrial Art
- Snowden Ashford, class of 1888, Washington D.C.'s first municipal architect
- Harold H. Bender, class of 1903, professor of philology at Princeton University
- Jules Prown, class of 1951, professor of art history at Yale University
- Barry Wellman, class of 1963, sociologist; founder of International Network for Social Network Analysis
- Brent Glass, class of 1969, director of Smithsonian National Museum of American History

=== Literature and poetry ===
- John Martin Crawford, class of 1871, translated the Finnish epic Kalevala into English; consul-general of the United States to Russia under President Benjamin Harrison
- Stephen Crane, author of The Red Badge of Courage; attended for one semester before leaving to focus exclusively on his writing
- Dominique Lapierre, class of 1952, author
- Martin Jezer, class of 1961, activist and author
- Jay Parini, class of 1970, poet and Middlebury College professor
- Ross Gay, class of 1996, poet
- M. K. Asante Jr., class of 2004, professor, author, and filmmaker
- Michael S. Schmidt, class of 2005, author and two-time Pulitzer Prize-winning Washington correspondent for The New York Times
- William Gayley Simpson, class of 1912, white nationalist and author

=== Medicine ===
- Philip S. Hench, class of 1916, winner of Nobel Prize in Physiology or Medicine in 1950
- Haldan K. Hartline, class of 1923, winner of Nobel Prize in Physiology or Medicine in 1967
- Orvan Hess, class of 1927, physician noted for his early use of penicillin and development of the fetal heart monitor
- C. Harmon Brown, class of 1952, pioneer in women's sports medicine; Olympic track and field coach

=== Military ===
- Andrew Porter, class of 1838 (non-graduate), honorary degree in 1865, brigadier general, U.S. Army
- Theophilus Francis Rodenbough, class of 1854 (non-graduate), brigadier general, U.S. Army; Medal of Honor recipient
- Charles A. Wikoff, class of 1855, most senior ranking United States Army officer killed in the Spanish–American War
- Duncan Stephen Walker, class of 1862 (non-graduate), brigadier general, U.S. Army, great-great-grandson of Benjamin Franklin
- Peyton C. March, class of 1884, Army chief of staff during World War I
- General George H. Decker, class of 1924, chief of staff of the United States Army, 1960–62
- David Showell, class of 1951, member of the Tuskegee Airmen; football player while at Lafayette; his exclusion led to the 1949 Sun Bowl controversy

=== Religion and theology ===
- William Henry Green, class of 1840, president of the College of New Jersey, professor of Biblical and Oriental Literature in Princeton Theological Seminary
- John Douglas Bemo (Husti-Coluc-Chee, later Tal-a-Mas-Mico), non-graduate 1843–46, nephew of Osceola, chief of the Seminoles; responsible for baptizing over 5,000 Native Americans in the Oklahoma Territory
- Seward Hiltner, class of 1931, Presbyterian minister and pastoral theologian
- W. A. P. Martin, class of 1860, Presbyterian missionary and translator
- James Isaac Good, class of 1872, clergyman

=== Sciences ===
- James H. Coffin, Lafayette College vice president and treasurer 1846–73, pioneer in meteorology
- William Harkness, attended 1854–56, astronomer
- Selden Jennings Coffin, class of 1858, first registrar of Lafayette, biographer of the college, professor of mathematics and astronomy
- William McMurtrie, class of 1871 and first Ph.D. in chemistry awarded at Lafayette (1875); chief chemist for the United States Department of Agriculture, 1873–78; president of American Chemical Society in 1900
- Maynard Bixby, class of 1876, discoverer of bixbyite and explorer
- Eugene C. Bingham, chemistry professor 1916–39, pioneer in rheology; namesake of Bingham plastic, fluid, and stress, and the Bingham Medal
- S. Donald Stookey, class of 1938, inventor of Corningware earned his master's degree in chemistry in the 1930s
- Jay Weiss, class of 1962, professor of psychiatry Emory University School of Medicine, MacArthur Fellow

=== Sports ===
- Harry Hempstead, class of 1891, owner of the New York Giants, National League baseball team
- George Barclay, class of 1898, inventor of the football helmet, outfielder for the St. Louis Cardinals and the Boston Beaneaters
- Charles Rinehart, class of 1898, College Football Hall of Fame member
- Dick Wright, catcher for the Brooklyn Tip-Tops
- Fritz Scheeren, class of 1914, pitcher for the Pittsburgh Pirates
- Ty Helfrich, class of 1915, second baseman for the Brooklyn Tip-Tops
- Al Bedner, class of 1921, NFL player
- George Seasholtz, class of 1922, NFL player for the Milwaukee Badgers and the Kenosha Maroons
- Mike Gazella, class of 1923, MLB player and three-time World Series Champion for the New York Yankees
- Frank Schwab, class of 1923, College Football Hall of Fame member
- Al LeConey, class of 1923, 1924 Summer Olympics gold medalist in the 4 × 100 meter relay, later featured on a U.S. postal stamp
- Charlie Berry Jr., class of 1924, College Football Hall of Fame member; the only man to officiate World Series, NFL Championship, and College All-Star game in the same year; catcher for the Boston Red Sox, Philadelphia Athletics, Chicago White Sox; NFL leading scorer in 1925 for the Pottsville Maroons
- Joe Marhefka, class of 1924, NFL player for Pottsville Maroons
- Matt Brennan, class of 1925, NFL player
- Frank Grube, class of 1926, catcher for the White Sox and St. Louis Browns
- Frank Kirkleski, class of 1927, NFL player for the Pottsville Maroons
- George Wilson, class of 1929, College Football Hall of Fame member and previous NCAA scoring record holder
- Frank Hiller, class of 1942, pitcher for the New York Yankees, Chicago Cubs, Cincinnati Reds
- Pete Carril, Class of 1952, head coach of Princeton University; enshrined in both the National Collegiate Basketball Hall of Fame and the Naismith Basketball Hall of Fame
- Joe Maddon, class of 1976, two-time World Series Champion (2002, 2016); former manager of Major League Baseball's Anaheim Angels, Chicago Cubs, and Tampa Bay Rays
- George Tiger, class of 1981, midfielder for Pittsburgh Spirit, 1984–1985
- Jeff Mutis, class of 1988, first-round draft pick in the 1988 Major League Baseball draft by the Cleveland Indians; played for the Florida Marlins, pitcher
- Blake Costanzo, class of 2006, linebacker and special teams specialist for the NFL's Chicago Bears and formerly the San Francisco 49ers, Cleveland Browns, and Buffalo Bills
- David Bednar, class of 2017, pitcher for the Pittsburgh Pirates and formerly San Diego Padres; named an All-Star in 2022
- Walt Zirinsky, American football player

== Notable faculty ==
- Guy Consolmagno, assistant professor, physics and astronomy
- Tom Davis, college men's basketball coach, 1971–77
- Clement Eaton, chair of history department, 1931–42
- Melvin Edwards, artist-in-residence, 2004–05
- Terry Jonathan Hart, visiting lecturer of engineering
- George Junkin, first president of Lafayette College
- Chawne Kimber, mathematician and quilter
- Butch van Breda Kolff, college men's basketball coach, 1952–56
- Tim Lenahan, men's soccer coach, 1998–2001
- Francis March, first professor of English Literature at any American college or university
- Herb McCracken, head football coach
- Bruce Allen Murphy, Supreme Court scholar
- Edward Mylin, head football coach
- Theodore Roethke, poet, served on faculty prior to his publication and fame
- Steve Spagnuolo, football coach, defensive line/special teams 1984–86
- Jock Sutherland, head football coach 1919–23
- Lee Upton, poet, writer-in-residence, professor of English
- Gary Williams, men's head soccer coach and assistant basketball coach, 1972–77
- Hal Wissel, college men's basketball coach, 1967–71

== Presidents of Lafayette College ==
- George Junkin, 1832–1841, 1844–1848
- John William Yeomans, 1841–1844
- Charles William Nassau, 1849–1850
- Daniel V. McLean, 1850–1857
- George Wilson McPhail, 1857–1863
- William Cassady Cattell, 1863–1883
- James Hall Mason Knox, 1883–1890
- Traill Green, 1890–1891 (acting)
- Ethelbert Dudley Warfield, 1891–1914
- John Henry MacCracken, 1915–1926
- Donald B. Prentice, 1926–1927 (acting)
- William Mather Lewis, 1927–1945
- Ralph Cooper Hutchison, 1945–1957, class of 1918
- Guy Everett Snavely, 1957–1958 (interim)
- K. Roald Bergethon, 1958–1978
- David Ellis, 1978–1990
- Robert I. Rotberg, 1990–1993
- Arthur J. Rothkopf, 1993–2005, class of 1955
- Daniel Weiss, 2005–2013
- Alison Byerly, 2013–2021
- Nicole Hurd, 2021–present

William Sebring Kirkpatrick served as acting president from 1902 to 1903 during the tenure of Warfield, who remained as president. Warfield had suffered a nervous breakdown before commencement in 1902, and was granted one year's absence to recuperate.
