= William Cattell =

William Cattell may refer to:

- William Cassady Cattell, Presbyterian divine and educator
- William Ashburner Cattell, American civil engineer
