= Bemo =

Bemo may refer to:

== Vehicles ==
- Bemo (taxi), share taxis and autorickshaws in Indonesia
- Daihatsu Midget, also marketed as the Bemo
- John Douglas Bemo (1824-1890) Seminole Christian missionary

== See also ==
- BMO (Adventure Time), also referred to as Beemo, fictional cartoon character
- BMO (disambiguation)
