= Alan Hoffman =

Alan Hoffman may refer to:

- Alan David Hoffmann (born 1946), Director General of the Jewish Agency for Israel
- Alan J. Hoffman (1924–2021), American mathematician
- Alan L. Hoffman (born 1966), Chief of Staff to Vice President of United States and Deputy Assistant to President
- America Hoffman, son of Abbie and Anita Hoffman who later took the name Alan
- Guy Big (1946–1978), Canadian actor, born Alan Hoffman
