= Ethelbert Dudley Warfield =

American academic administrator

The Reverend Ethelbert Dudley Warfield D.D., LL.D
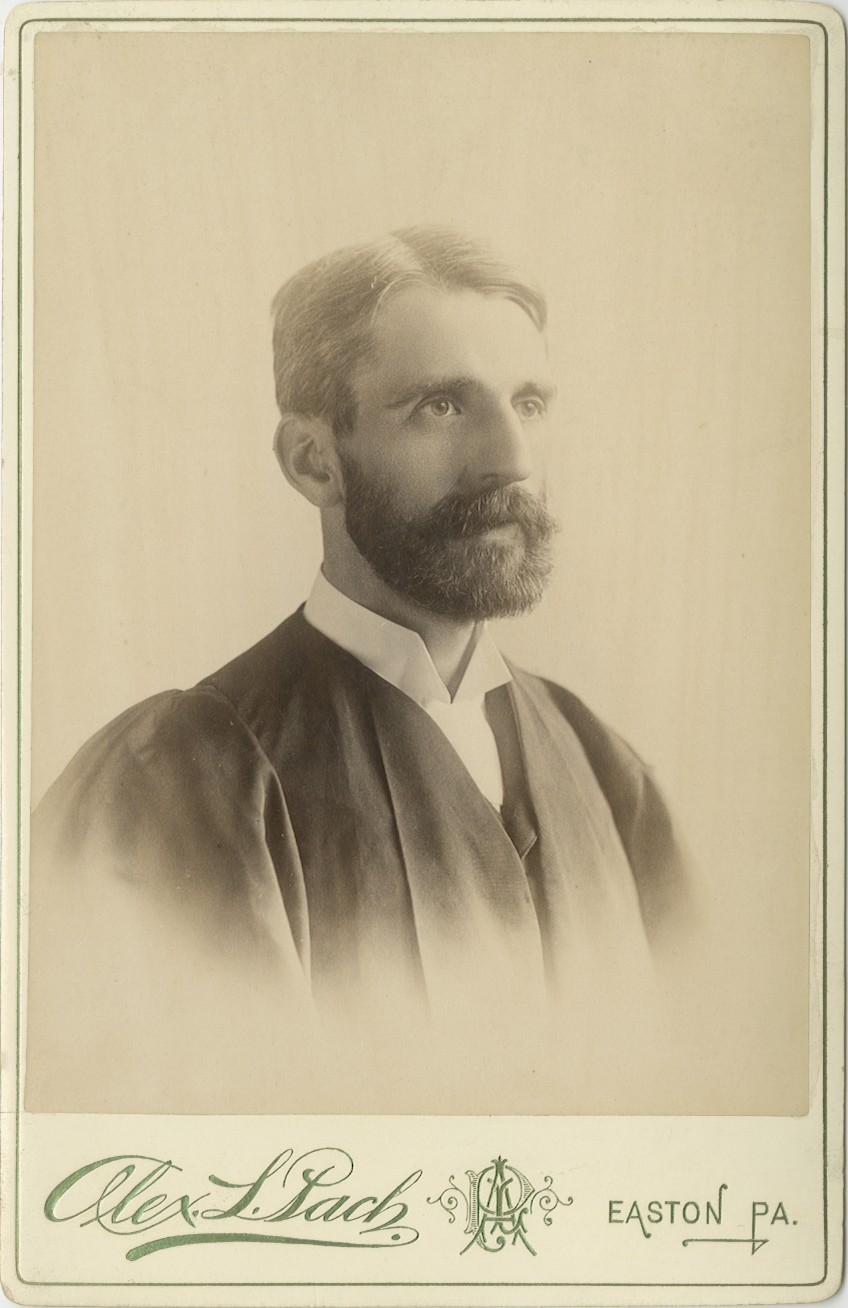

President of Wilson College
- In office 1915–1936
- Preceded by: Anna J. McKeag
- Succeeded by: Unknown

President of Lafayette College
- In office 1891–1914
- Preceded by: James Hall Mason Knox
- Succeeded by: John Henry MacCracken

President of Miami University
- In office 1888–1891
- Preceded by: Robert White McFarland
- Succeeded by: William Oxley Thompson

Personal details
- Born: March 16, 1861 Lexington, Kentucky
- Died: July 6, 1936 (aged 75)
- Spouse(s): Sarah Lacy Brookes; Nellie Frances Tilton
- Children: 6
- Education: Princeton University; University of Oxford; Columbia University Law School
- Profession: Professor

Ethelbert Dudley Warfield, D.D., LL.D. (March 16, 1861 – July 6, 1936) was an American professor of history and college president who served as president of Miami University, Lafayette College and Wilson College. As Miami University's youngest president, he was noted for bringing football to Miami where its first intercollegiate game was played against the University of Cincinnati in 1888.

== Early life ==
He was born in Lexington, Kentucky, to William Warfield and Mary Cabell (née Breckinridge) Warfield. He was the brother of Princeton theologian Benjamin Breckinridge Warfield (1851–1921). His maternal grandfather was the Presbyterian preacher Robert Jefferson Breckinridge (1800–1871), the son of John Breckinridge, a former United States Senator and Attorney General. His uncle was John C. Breckinridge, the fourteenth Vice President of the United States, and a Confederate general in the American Civil War. A fourth cousin twice removed of his was Wallis Warfield Simpson, for whom Great Britain's King Edward VIII abdicated his throne in order to marry.

Warfield graduated from Princeton University in 1882, studied at Wadham College of University of Oxford from 1882 to 1883, and graduated from the Columbia University Law School in 1885. He was ordained as a minister of the Presbyterian Church in October 1899.

== Career ==
After attending Columbia Law School, Warfield briefly practiced law in New York and in Lexington, Kentucky before being appointed professor of history and president of Miami University at the age of 27. In 1888, he was chosen to be Miami University's youngest president and today is remembered for bringing college football to Miami during his term—with its first intercollegiate game being played against the University of Cincinnati in 1888. The Miami-Cincinnati rivalry is the oldest west of the Allegheny mountains.

After three years at Miami, he accepted an appointment as president of Lafayette College where he served from 1891 until 1914. During his time at Lafayette, Warfield was elected to the American Philosophical Society. He retired from Lafayette, moved to Los Angeles, California, where he took up private law practice until his final appointment, as president of Wilson College in Chambersburg, Pennsylvania, succeeding Anna Jane McKeag, the first woman president of Wilson. Warfield remained at Wilson until his retirement in 1936.

== Personal life ==
Warfield was married twice, first to Sarah Lacy Warfield (née Brookes) (1864–1886) and secondly, on August 28, 1890, in Natick, Massachusetts to Nellie Frances Warfield (née Tilton) (1864–1941), the daughter of J. Edward Tilton and Edie Lovia Tilton (née Wite). With his second wife, Warfield was the father of seven children.

Warfield was an elder in the Presbyterian Church, a director of the Princeton Theological Seminary and an officer in the Sons of the American Revolution. He authored a number of historical works including works related to his relatives John Breckinridge and Joseph C. Breckinridge.

He was buried in the Lexington Cemetery in Lexington, Kentucky, along with his parents, his second wife, and several of his children.

=== Honorary degrees ===
In 1891, Princeton University conferred upon him the degree of LL.D. and in 1902, Washington and Jefferson gave him the degree of D.D.

== See also ==
- Breckinridge family

Academic offices
Preceded by Robert White McFarland	President of Miami University; 1888–1891	Succeeded by William Oxley Thompson
Preceded by Traill Green (acting)	President of Lafayette College; 1891–1914	Succeeded by John Henry MacCracken
Preceded by Anna J. McKeag	President of Wilson College; 1915–1936	Succeeded by Unknown
