= Traill Green =

American physician

Traill Green M.D., LL.D
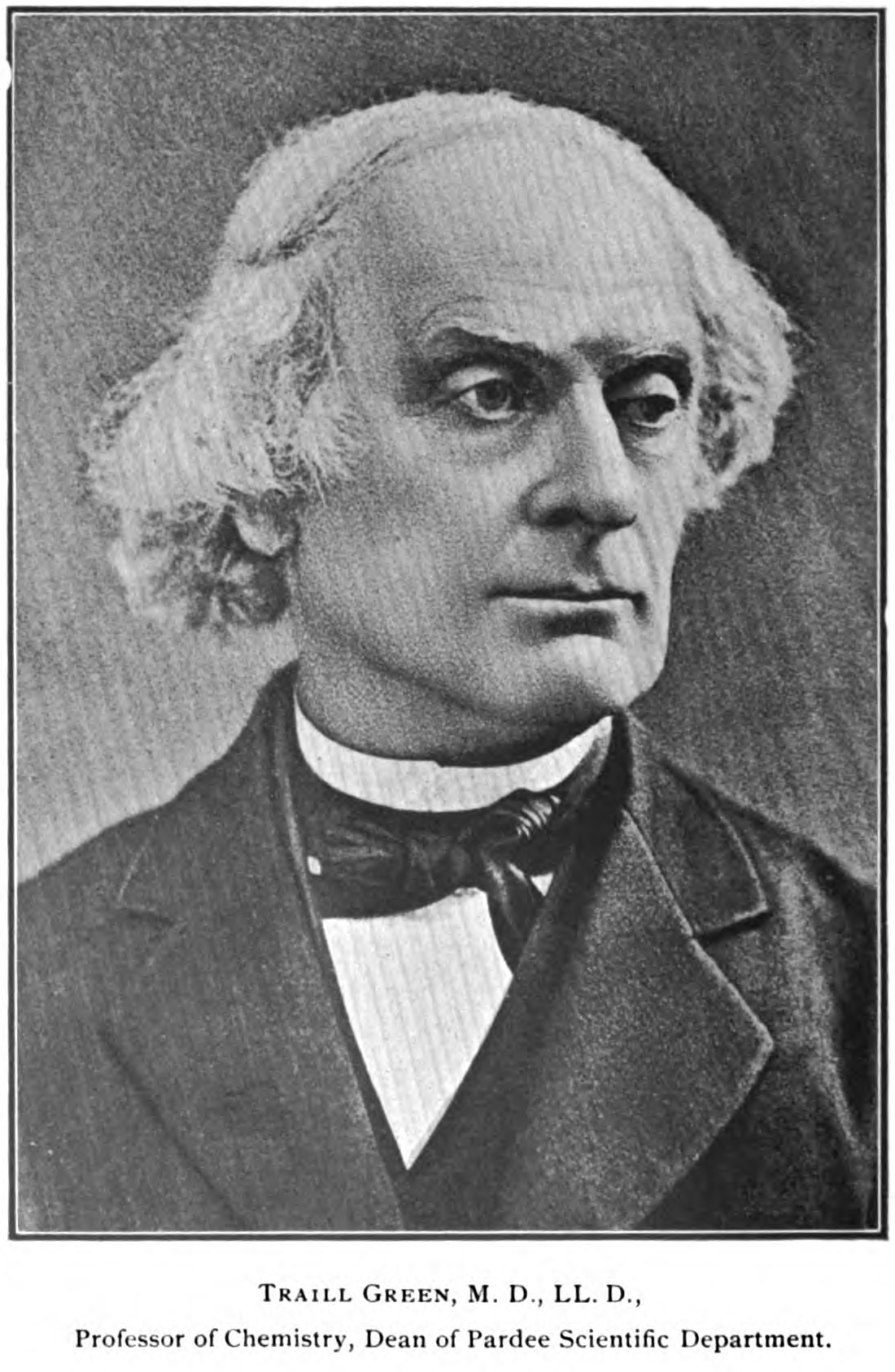
- Born: May 25, 1813; Easton, Pennsylvania, U.S.
- Died: April 29, 1897 (aged 81); Easton, Pennsylvania, U.S.
- Education: University of Pennsylvania
- Occupation: Physician

Dr. Traill Green M.D., LL.D (May 25, 1813 – April 29, 1897) was a medical doctor, scientist, and educator. Green was actively engaged with the early years of Lafayette College, serving at various times as a professor, trustee, and acting president. He was a civic leader in Easton, Pennsylvania, where he lived most of his life.

== Early life ==
Green was born in Easton, Pennsylvania, in 1813 to Benjamin and Elizabeth Green, who instilled upon him an interest in nature and science. This led to Green pursuing education in medicine, attending the University of Pennsylvania medical program where he graduated in 1835.

== Career ==
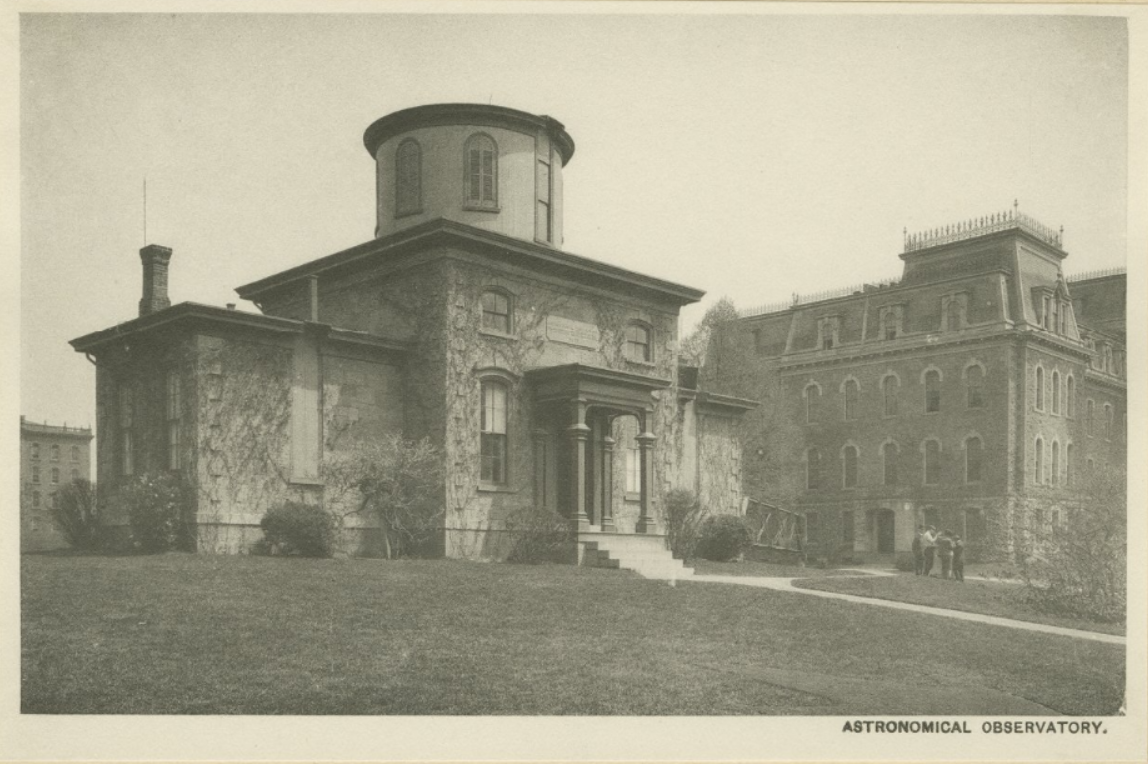
The observatory at Lafayette College that Green donated

Immediately following his graduation, Green was appointed to the Philadelphia dispensary, where he worked for one year before opening up his own medical practice in Easton. Knowledgeable in the field of medicine, Green was asked in 1837 by the newly-formed Lafayette College if he would become the school's professor of chemistry, a role in which he taught for another four years. Following this stint with Lafayette, Green served on the chair of natural sciences at Marshall College from 1841 to 1848, where he pursued his interests in botany.

In 1848, Green returned to Easton where he resumed his medical practice and his relationship with Lafayette as a trustee to the school. In 1849 he was again named head of the department of chemistry, a position he held until his death in 1897. While at the school, Green worked alongside James Henry Coffin, an individual also interested in the sciences, and more specifically, meteorology. Green, who owned his own telescope, took it upon himself to incorporate meteorology into the curriculum at Lafayette, and in 1864 donated $15,000 towards the creation of a building which would be used to house this telescope. This building, colloquially known as the "Star Barn" on campus, was eventually moved to make way for a chapel, and later dismantled to make way for a new mining and metallurgical building on campus; its stones used to build a new gateway for the school, its monolithic telescope base as the cornerstone for the new gymnasium, and its inscribed stone tablet placed on the chapel where the observatory had originally stood.

Upon the donation of this astronomy building, Green asked then-president William Cassady Cattell that his name not be mentioned upon the laying of the cornerstone. Cattell honored this wish, yet loosely hinted at the building's donor in his dedication saying, "The donor was too modest to allow his name to be mentioned....whoever he was, his name would be green in the memories of all true lovers of Lafayette."

Green also took an active role in the town of Easton, acting as president of the board of the Easton Area School District, president of the Easton Cemetery Company, and director of the Easton Gas Company, among others. In medicine, he was a trustee of the Harrisburg Hospital, first president of the American Academy of Medicine, founding member of the American Association for the Advancement of Science, and a presiding member for many Pennsylvania medical societies affiliated with the American Medical Association. He was also elected an Associate Fellow of the College of Physicians of Philadelphia.

As one of his final roles in life, Green served as the acting president of Lafayette College from 1890 to 1891.

== Personal life ==
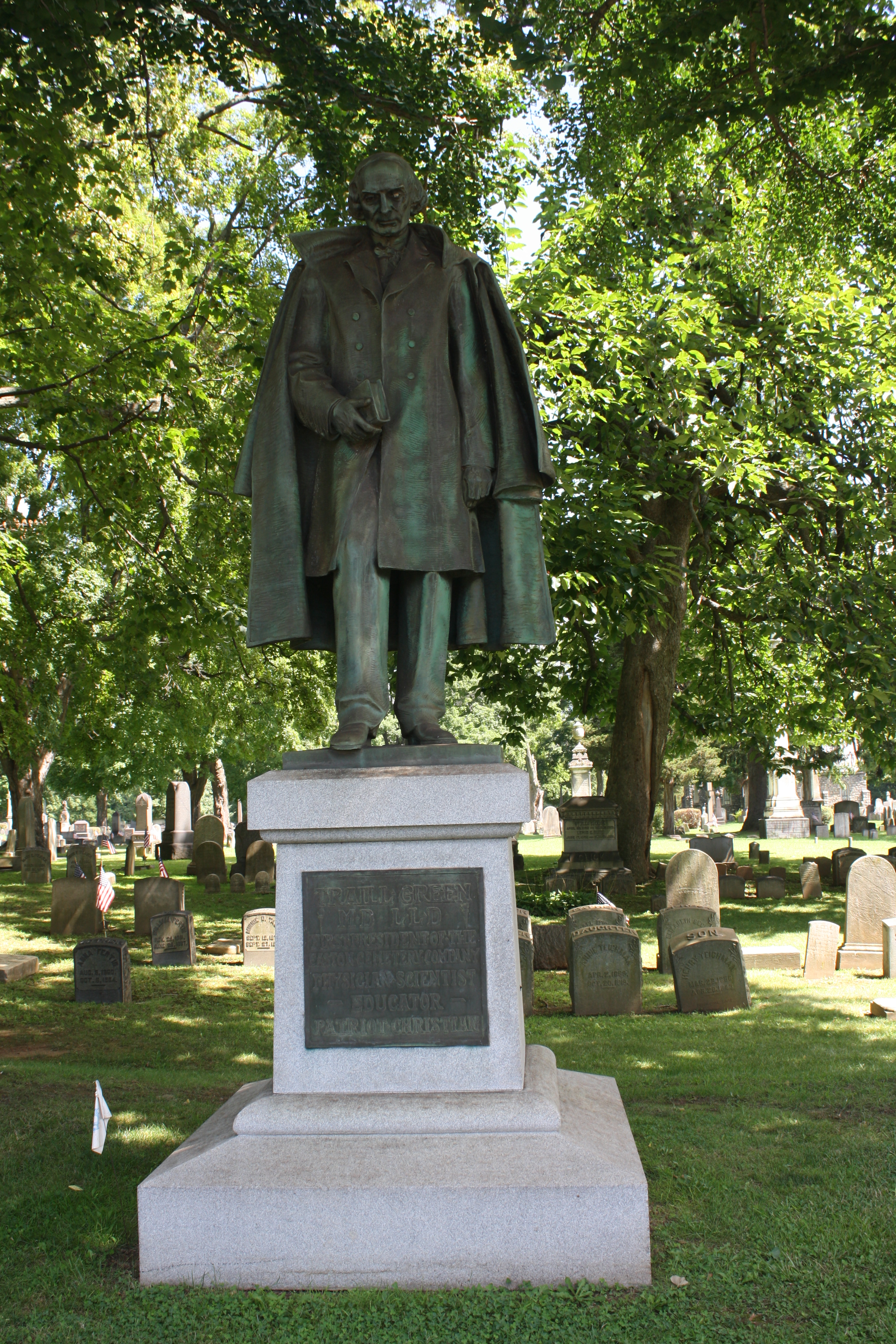
Monument to Green at his graveside in Easton, Pennsylvania

In 1844, Green married Harriet Moore, who he had met at one of his botany classes. Together they had three children.

In 1841, he received the honorary degree of Master of Arts from Rutgers University, and in 1866 received the honorary degree of Legum Doctor from Washington and Jefferson College. He was elected as a member of the American Philosophical Society in 1868.

He died on April 29, 1897, in his hometown of Easton, Pennsylvania.

== Botany and botanical collections ==
Along with regularly teaching classes for "boys and girls" in botany, he also held classes specifically for adult women. Specimens collected by Green are held by multiple North American herbaria, including the Putnam Museum herbarium, Bailey Hortorium Herbarium at Cornell University, the herbarium of the Academy of Natural Sciences of Drexel University, and Pennsylvania State University Herbarium. In Australasia, specimens are held by the National Herbarium of Victoria - Royal Botanic Gardens Victoria.

Academic offices
Preceded by James Hall Mason Knox	President of Lafayette College (acting); 1890–1891	Succeeded by Ethelbert Dudley Warfield
