= Attorney General Frelinghuysen =

Attorney General Frelinghuysen may refer to:

- Frederick Theodore Frelinghuysen (1817–1885), Attorney General of New Jersey
- Theodore Frelinghuysen (1787–1862), Attorney General of New Jersey
