= F. M. Kirby Center =

Historic movie theater in Wilkes-Barre, Pennsylvania

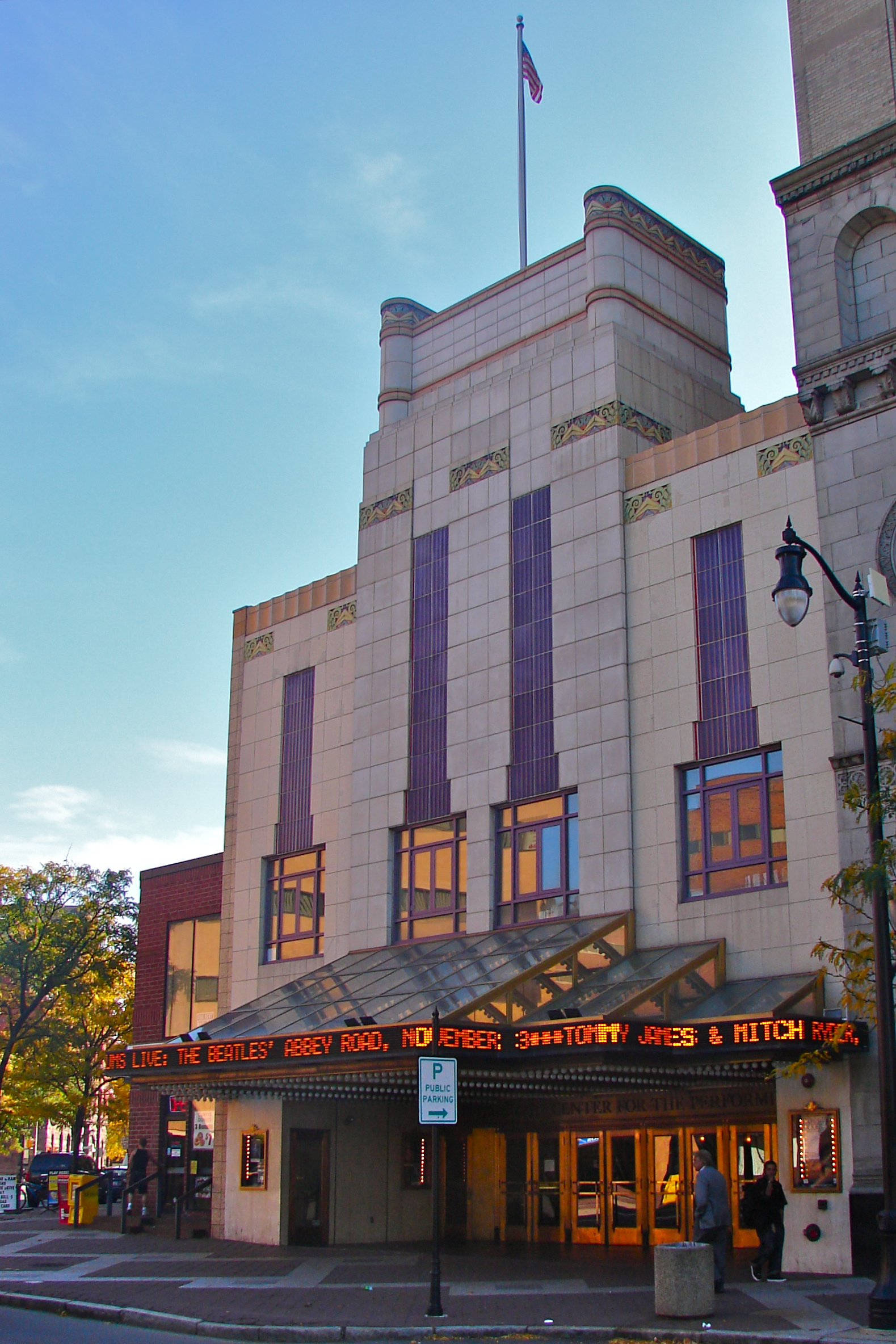
- Exterior of venue, c. 2011
- Interactive map of F. M. Kirby Center
- Full name: F. M. Kirby Center for the Performing Arts
- Former names: Comerford Theatre (1938–49); Paramount Theatre (1949–86)
- Address: 71 Public Square; Wilkes-Barre, PA 18701-2507
- Location: Wyoming Valley
- Capacity: 1,832

Construction
- Opened: August 18, 1938
- Architect: Charles A. Ryan

Website
- Venue Website
- Comerford Theater
- U.S. National Register of Historic Places
- Architectural style: Moderne Deco, "Depression moderne"
- NRHP reference No.: 80003564
- Added to NRHP: December 3, 1980

The F. M. Kirby Center (formerly known as the Comerford Theatre and Paramount Theatre) is a historic Art Deco-Moderne style movie theater located at Wilkes-Barre, Pennsylvania. It was added to the National Register of Historic Places in 1980.

== History ==
Comerford Theater was built in 1937 as an Art Deco-Moderne style theater building on Public Square in Wilkes-Barre. The building takes an irregular trapezoidal shape. It is of steel frame and brick construction with a four bay wide, terra cotta and marble front facade. The front facade features a stylized ziggurat composition, a central tower, corrugated steel decoration, and a marquee. It was added to the National Register of Historic Places in 1980.

The Capitol Theatre, also on Public Square, was built in 1920. It was renamed the Comerford Theatre after the original Comerford was renamed the Paramount in the 1940s. The second Comerford was multiplexed and renamed the Barre East-West Loge in the 1970s and demolished soon after.

The theatre was developed by Michael E. Comerford, owner of the Comerford Theaters Inc. Comerford was also a founder of the Motion Picture Theatre Owners of America and a director of the Scranton Chamber of Commerce. At the height of its success, the Comerford Theaters Inc. owned and operated over 80 movie theaters in Northeastern Pennsylvania and Upstate New York.

Following the success of a Comerford Theater in Scranton, the company began construction of a new theater in Wilkes-Barre. Construction began in 1937 with the assistance of the Penn-York Utilities, Inc. and designed by Charles A. Ryan. It opened August 18, 1938, with a showing of Alexander's Ragtime Band. At the time, the theatre could seat 2,047 patrons.

As a result of the 1949 antitrust laws, ownership of the theater was transferred to the Penn Paramount Company. Closing briefly for repairs, the theatre reopened on September 2, 1949, as the Paramount Theatre. Operations continued until the early 1970s. Attendance dropped after the venue was flooded due to Hurricane Agnes. The theatre ceased operations in 1977 after the property was sold to a new owner. The theatre saw occasional use as a concert and boxing venue. Local businesses formed a group known as "Save the Old Paramount" (or S.T.O.P.). A few years later, the building was added to the National Register of Historic Places.

Throughout a majority of the 80s, the venue was mostly vacant as it was desperate need of repairs. In 1985, Albert Boscov, August L. Simms and Fred M. Kirby II raised $3.3 million to restored the theatre. Construction began on December 21, 1985. It opened September 19, 1986, as the F. M. Kirby Center for the Performing Arts, after Fred Morgan Kirby.
