= Longdon L. Miller Covered Bridge =

- U.S. National Register of Historic Places
- Washington County History & Landmarks Foundation Landmark
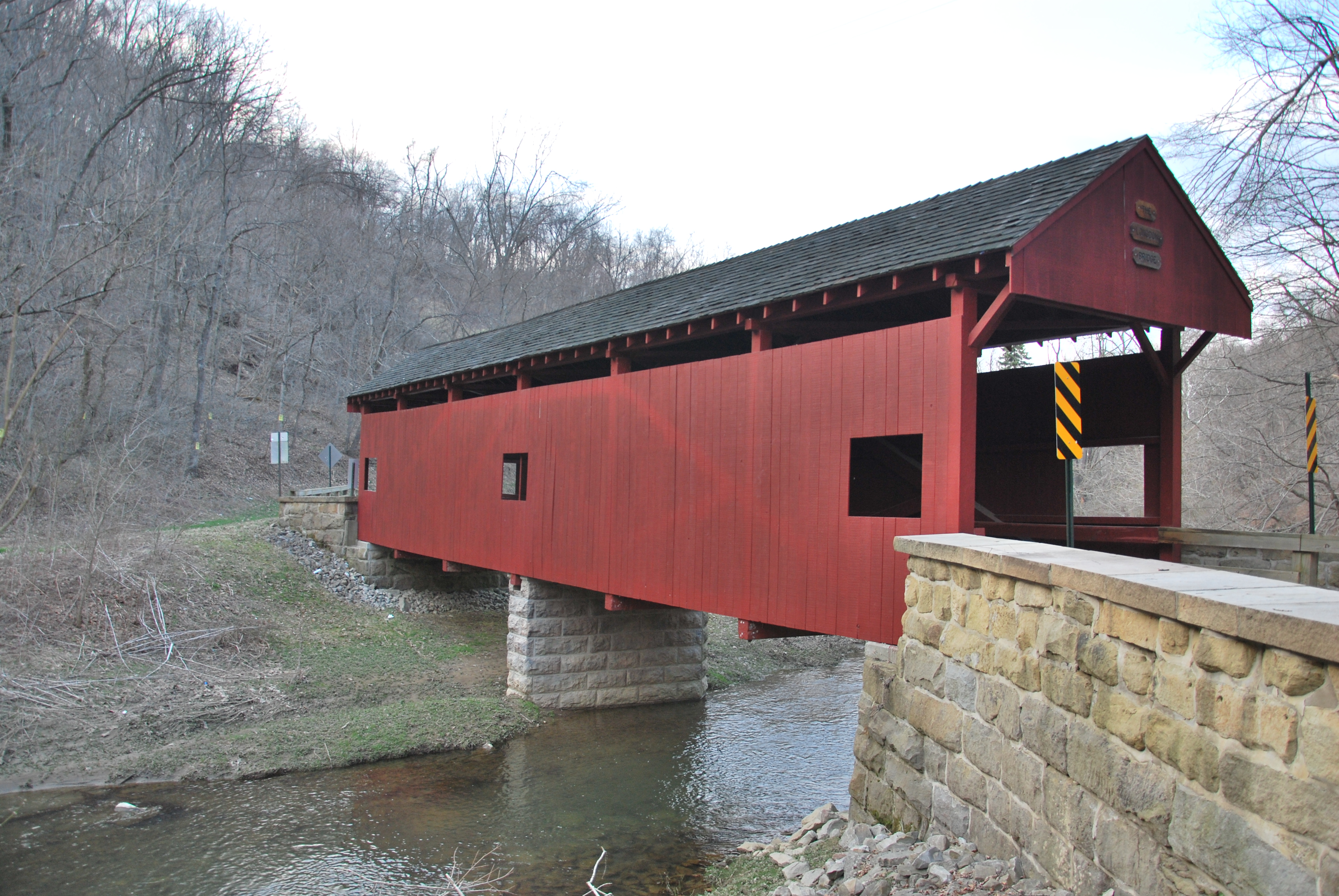
- Longdon L. Miller Covered Bridge in March 2010

- Location within Pennsylvania Location within the United States
- Nearest city: West Finley, Pennsylvania
- Coordinates: 39.97789°N 80.4461°W
- Area: 0.1 acres (0.040 ha)
- Architectural style: Queenpost truss
- MPS: Covered Bridges of Washington and Greene Counties TR
- NRHP reference No.: 79002363
- Added to NRHP: June 22, 1979

The Longdon L. Miller Covered Bridge is a historic covered bridge in West Finley, Pennsylvania.

It is designated as a historic bridge by the Washington County History & Landmarks Foundation.
