= John P. Stockton =

American politician

John Potter Stockton
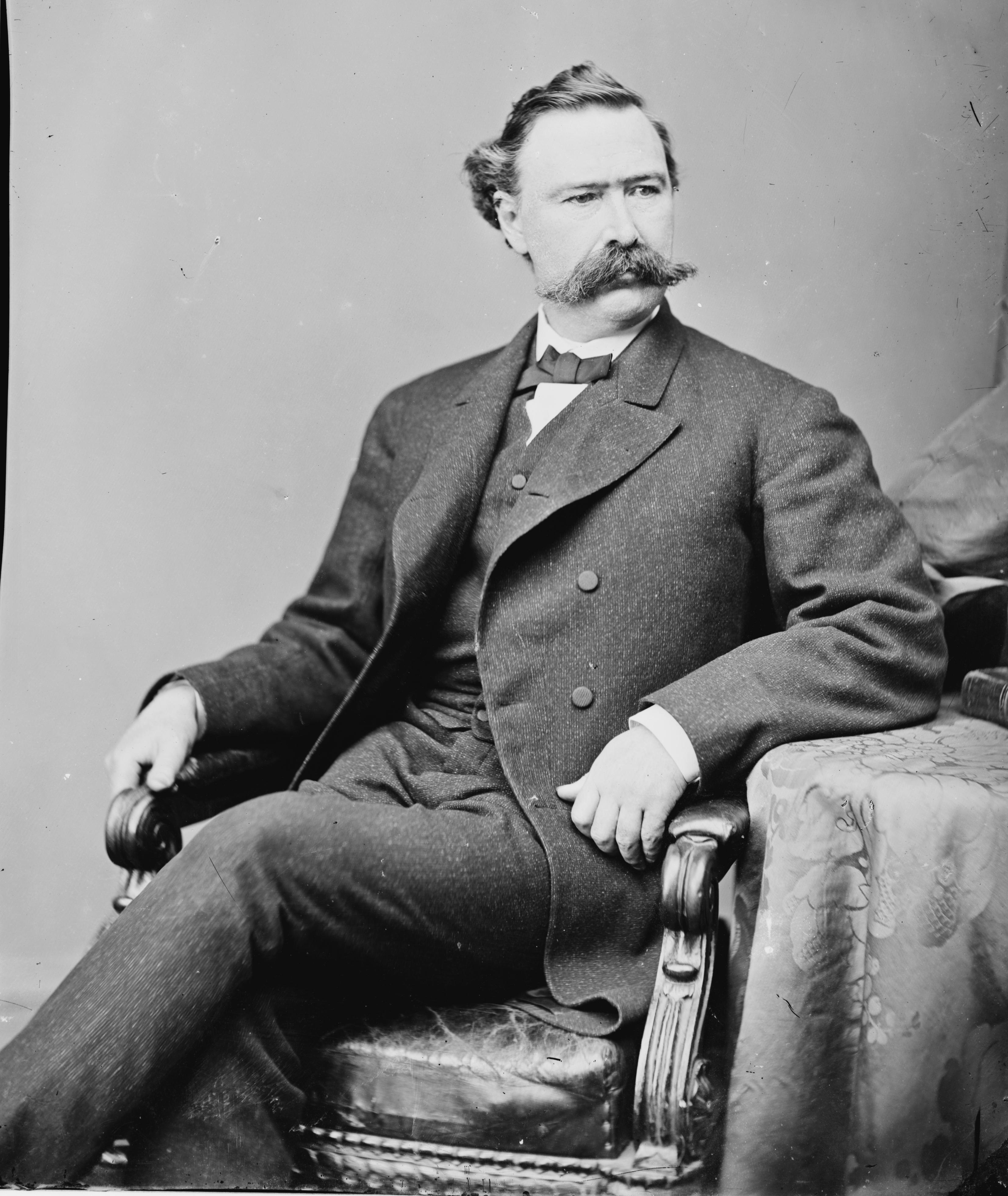
- Stockton c. 1860–75

27th Attorney General of New Jersey
- In office April 8, 1877 – April 5, 1897
- Governor: Joseph D. Bedle; George B. McClellan; George C. Ludlow; Leon Abbett; Robert S. Green; George T. Werts; John W. Griggs
- Preceded by: Jacob Vanatta
- Succeeded by: Samuel H. Grey

United States Senator from New Jersey
- In office March 4, 1869 – March 3, 1875
- Preceded by: Frederick T. Frelinghuysen
- Succeeded by: Theodore F. Randolph
- In office March 15, 1865 – March 27, 1866
- Preceded by: John C. Ten Eyck
- Succeeded by: Alexander G. Cattell

2nd United States Minister to the Papal States
- In office November 27, 1858 – May 23, 1861
- President: James Buchanan; Abraham Lincoln
- Preceded by: Lewis Cass, Jr.
- Succeeded by: Alexander Randall

Personal details
- Born: John Potter Stockton; August 2, 1826 Princeton, New Jersey, U.S.
- Died: January 22, 1900 (aged 73) New York City, New York, U.S.
- Resting place: Princeton Cemetery, Princeton, New Jersey
- Party: Democratic
- Spouse: Sarah Marks
- Relations: Robert F. Stockton (father); Richard Stockton (1764-1828) (grandfather); Richard Stockton (1730-1781) (great-grandfather)
- Children: 5
- Education: Princeton University (AB)
- Occupation: Politician, Lawyer

John Potter Stockton (August 2, 1826 – January 22, 1900) was a New Jersey politician who served in the United States Senate as a Democrat. He was New Jersey Attorney General for twenty years (1877 to 1897), and served as United States Minister to the Papal States from 1858 to 1861.

The scion of a family long prominent in New Jersey government and politics, John P. Stockton was a native of Princeton, New Jersey, and an 1843 graduate of Princeton University. After studying law, attaining admission to the bar, and practicing in Princeton and Trenton, in 1858 Stockton was appointed as Minister to the Papal States. He served until 1861, and returned home after the Republican administration of Abraham Lincoln came to power following the 1860 presidential election.

In March 1865, Stockton was elected to the U.S. Senate. In March 1866, the Senate voted to remove him after his election was contested on the grounds that he had been chosen by a plurality of the New Jersey legislature, rather than a majority. He returned to the Senate in 1869 and served one six-year term, March 1869 to March 1875. After losing renomination to the Senate in 1875, in 1877 he was appointed as state attorney general, a position he continued to hold until he retired in 1897.

Stockton died in New York City on January 22, 1900. He was buried at Princeton Cemetery.

== Early life ==
Born in Princeton, New Jersey, Stockton was the son of Navy officer and Senator Robert F. Stockton and Harriet M. (Potter) Stockton. He was the grandson of Richard Stockton (1764-1828) and great-grandson of Richard Stockton (1730-1781), both prominent New Jersey politicians. John Stockton was educated privately and graduated from Princeton University, then known as the College of New Jersey, in 1843.

== Start of career ==
Stockton studied law with his cousin Richard Stockton Field, was admitted to the bar in 1846, and practiced in Princeton and Trenton. From 1852 to 1858, Stockton served as reporter of decisions for the state court of chancery.

== Minister to Rome ==
In 1858, he was appointed US minister to the Papal States, and he served until 1861. During his time in Rome, Stockton became involved in resolving the controversy created when the Pontifical Swiss Guard attacked and robbed several American citizens. Edward Newton Perkins and his party were staying at a hotel Perugia when members of the Pope's army stormed the city on June 20, 1859. The soldiers killed the owner of the hotel and two of his staff, then robbed the terrified guests. Perkins and his family were among the victims, and Perkins' complained to Stockton, who sent Perkins' complaint and one of his own to Secretary of State Lewis Cass, and had them published in The New York Times. The Papal States' loss of prestige and moral authority as a result of this incident contributed to the change in political climate that made possible the annexation of the Papal States to the newly unified Italian city-states when they were organized as the Kingdom of Italy in 1860.

Republican Abraham Lincoln won the 1860 presidential election and began to make new appointments to diplomatic posts after taking office in 1861. Stockton resigned, and returned to New Jersey to resume the practice of law.

== U.S. Senator ==
Stockton was elected to the US Senate in 1865, and served from March 15, 1865, to March 27, 1866. On March 27 the Senate voted 23 to 20 that Stockton's election had been improper on the grounds that he was chosen by a plurality rather than a majority of the state legislature. Most of the senators who voted for Stockton's removal wanted to ensure the closely divided Senate would be able to override Democratic President Andrew Johnson's Reconstruction era vetoes by replacing Stockton with a Republican. Congress later passed a law requiring state legislative majorities in elections for U.S. Senators, resolving the question of whether a plurality was sufficient. (Note: Sabato and Ernst name the senator in the contested election as Robert F. Stockton, but the timeline and circumstances make clear they are referring to the election of John P. Stockton.)

In 1869, Stockton was again elected to the Senate, and he served one term, March 4, 1869, to March 3, 1875. While in Washington, D.C. attending a Senate session in 1869, Stockton's Trenton home was burglarized. According to news accounts of the break-in, the burglars found nothing of value to steal, and contented themselves with upending the home's furniture and dressing the Stockton family's brooms in their old clothes. In 1872, he was a delegate to the Democratic National Convention. In January 1875, Stockton was an unsuccessful candidate for renomination, and he left the Senate at the end of his term.

== Later career ==
Stockton served as New Jersey Attorney General from April 8, 1877 to April 5, 1897. During his tenure, Stockton was appointed to a three-member commission that proposed revisions and updates to New Jersey's state court processes and procedures. The commission's final report was accepted by the state legislature and codified into law.

In addition to practicing law and serving as attorney general, Stockton remained active in Democratic Party politics. He was a delegate to several state and national party conventions, including the 1884 Democratic National Convention.

In 1890 Senator Stockton was elected as an honorary member of the New Jersey Society of the Cincinnati.

== Death and burial ==
Stockton died on January 22, 1900, at the Hotel Hanover in New York City, where he had lived for several months with his daughter Julia and her husband. He was interred at Princeton Cemetery in Princeton.

== Family ==
In 1845, Stockton married Sarah Marks (1829-1887). She was from a Jewish family in New Orleans, and the marriage scandalized polite society in New Jersey. Sarah Marks Stockton later observed that she was never accepted in Princeton's social circles, even after she began worshipping as an Episcopalian.

The Stocktons were the parents of: Robert Field (1847-1891); John Potter (1852-1927); Sarah (Saidee) (1853-1868); Richard (1858-1929); and Julia Stockton St. John (1861-1905).

== Notes ==
U.S. Senate
Preceded by John C. Ten Eyck	U.S. senator (Class 2) from New Jersey; 1865–1866; Served alongside: William Wright	Succeeded by Alexander G. Cattell
Preceded by Frederick T. Frelinghuysen	U.S. senator (Class 1) from New Jersey; 1869–1875; Served alongside: Alexander G. Cattell, Frederick T. Frelinghuysen	Succeeded by Theodore F. Randolph
Legal offices
Preceded by Jacob Vanatta	New Jersey Attorney General; 1877–1897	Succeeded by Samuel H. Grey
Diplomatic posts
Preceded by Lewis Cass, Jr.	United States Ambassador (as Minister Resident) to the Papal States; 1858–1861	Succeeded by Alexander Randall
