= Robert White McFarland =

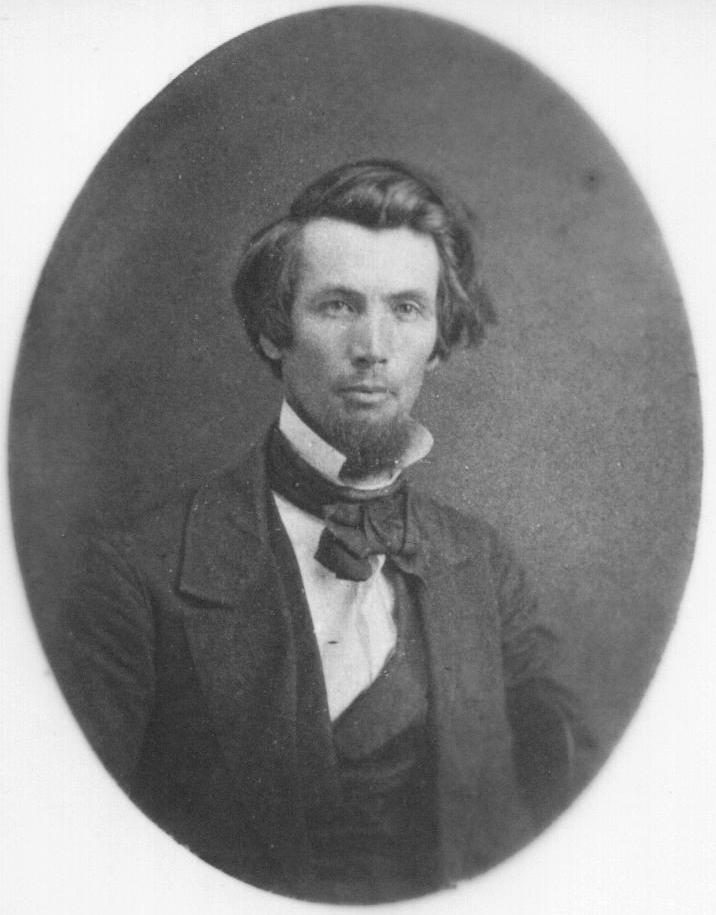
McFarland in 1858

Robert White McFarland (June 16, 1825 – October 23, 1910) was an American engineer who served as a university professor, president and Civil War officer.

McFarland was born in Champaign County, Ohio, to Robert and Eunice (Dorsey) McFarland. He received his A.B and M.A. degrees from Ohio Wesleyan University. In 1856 he received a teaching appointment at Miami University in Oxford, Ohio, where he remained until the university closed in 1873. On leave from Miami, McFarland became an officer in the 86th Ohio Infantry during the American Civil War and rose to the rank of lieutenant colonel.

He was the first professor of mathematics and civil engineering at the newly opened Ohio State University, appointed in 1873.

When Miami University reopened in 1885, McFarland became its president and continued in that office until 1888. He died in Oxford, Ohio, in 1910 and is buried in the Oxford Cemetery.

Academic offices
Preceded by Andrew Dousa Hepburn	President of Miami University; 1885-1888	Succeeded by Ethelbert Dudley Warfield
