= Alexander G. Cattell =

American politician

Alexander Gilmore Cattell
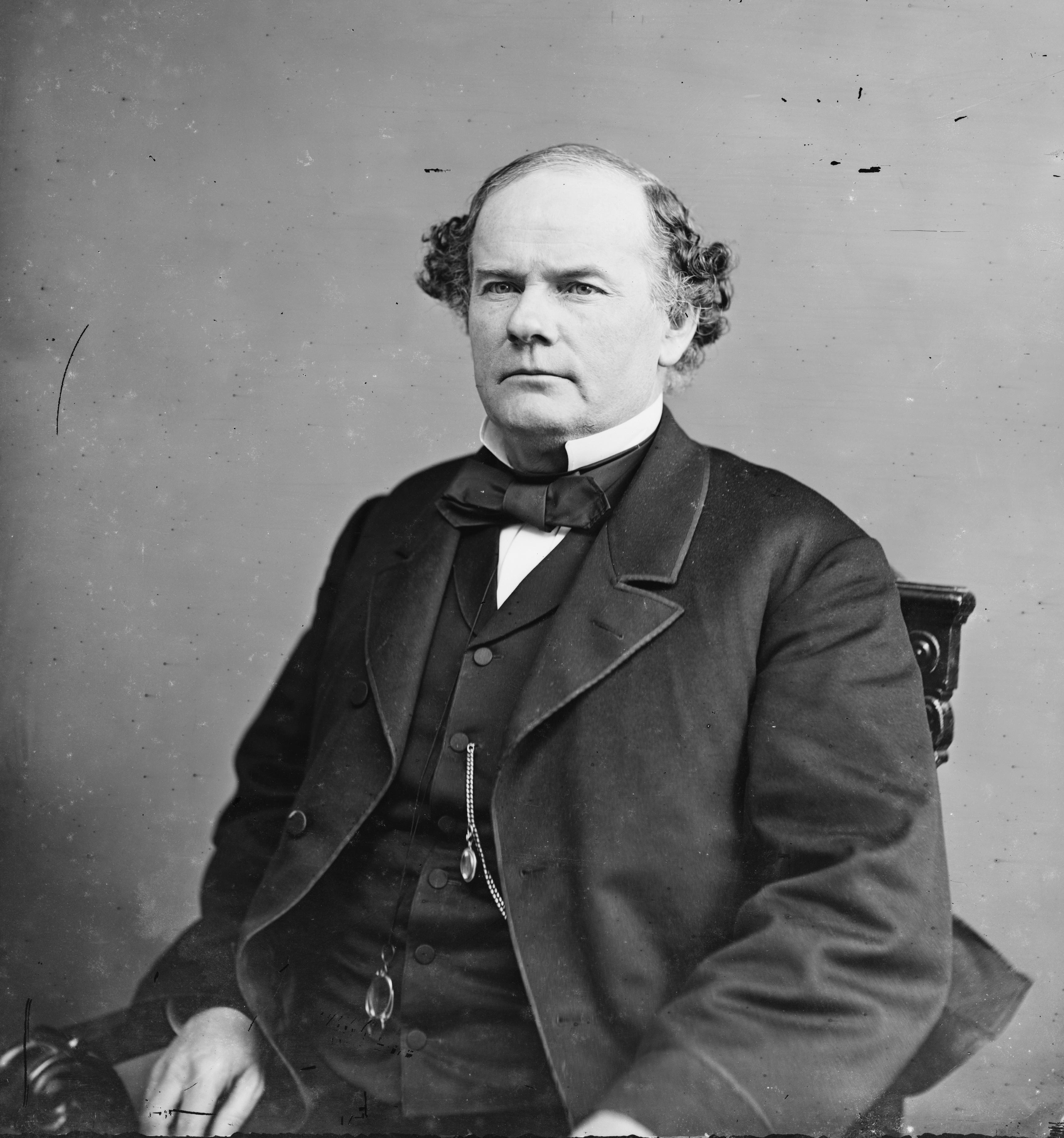

United States Senator from New Jersey
- In office September 19, 1866 – March 3, 1871
- Preceded by: John P. Stockton
- Succeeded by: Frederick T. Frelinghuysen

Member of the New Jersey General Assembly
- In office 1840

Personal details
- Born: February 12, 1816 Salem, New Jersey, U.S.
- Died: April 8, 1894 (aged 78) Jamestown, New York, U.S.
- Party: Republican
- Relatives: William Cassady Cattell (brother)

Alexander Gilmore Cattell (February 12, 1816 – April 8, 1894) was a United States senator from New Jersey.

== Biography ==
=== Early life ===
Cattell was born in Salem, New Jersey. He received an academic education, and engaged in mercantile pursuits in Salem until 1846.

=== Early career ===
Cattell was elected to the New Jersey General Assembly in 1840, and served as clerk from 1842 to 1844. He was a member of the State constitutional convention in 1844 and moved to Philadelphia in 1846, where he engaged in business and banking. He was a member of the Philadelphia Common Council from 1848 to 1854, organized the Corn Exchange Bank, and was its president from 1858 to 1871.

=== Congress ===
In 1863, Cattell moved to Merchantville, New Jersey in 1863 and was elected as a Republican to the U.S. Senate to succeed John P. Stockton, whose seat was declared vacant, and served from September 19, 1866, to March 3, 1871. He was not a candidate for reelection. While in the Senate, he was chairman of the Joint Committee on the Library for the Forty-first Congress.

=== Later life ===
Cattell was appointed by President Ulysses Grant to be a member of the first United States Civil Service Commission and served two years, resigning to accept the position of United States financial agent in London, serving in 1873 and 1874. He was a member of New Jersey Board of Tax Assessors from 1884 to 1891, and was its president from 1889 to 1891. In 1891, he was appointed a member of the State board of education for a term of three years.

Cattell died in Jamestown, New York in 1894 and was interred in Colestown Cemetery in Cherry Hill, New Jersey. He had five brothers and two sisters, his one brother, William Cassady Cattell, served as the sixth president of Lafayette College.

== See also ==
- Scandals of the Ulysses S. Grant administration#Cattellism

U.S. Senate
Preceded by John P. Stockton	U.S. senator (Class 2) from New Jersey; September 19, 1866 – March 3, 1871; Served alongside: William Wright, Frederick T. Frelinghuysen, John P. Stockton	Succeeded by Frederick T. Frelinghuysen
