= Anna J. McKeag =

American psychologist, college president

Anna Jane McKeag
- Born: March 13, 1864; West Finley, Pennsylvania
- Died: 1947 (aged 82–83); Wellesley, Massachusetts
- Burial place: Washington Cemetery, Washington, Pennsylvania
- Education: Wilson College; University of Pennsylvania
- Occupations: Psychologist, educator

Anna Jane McKeag (1864–1947), was an American PhD psychologist who was a university professor and the first woman president of Wilson College.

== Life and work ==
McKeag was born March 13, 1864, in West Finley, Pennsylvania. In her early years, she taught school (1881–1892) while also teaching philosophy at Wilson College, an all women's institution in Chambersburg, Pennsylvania.

In 1895, she earned her AB at Wilson College and five years later she was awarded her PhD at the University of Pennsylvania (1900). Then she was a professor of philosophy and dean of Wilson College until 1902 when she was lured to Wellesley College by trustees there.

McKeag was still a professor of education at Wellesley when she was asked to take on the presidency of Wilson College in 1911 (assuming her duties in February 1912). According to the College, "she became the first woman president (1911–15), [and] strengthened the College’s academic standards." After three years as head of Wilson College, McKeag returned to Wellesley where she taught until her retirement.

She died in Wellesley, Massachusetts, and her gravestone can be found in Washington Cemetery in Washington, Pennsylvania.

== Memberships ==
- American Psychological Association
- National Society of College Teachers of Education
- New England Society of College Teachers of Education
- National Executive Committee of the School Peace League

== Selected publications ==
- McKeag, A. J. (1879). In the brave old days of old – A tale of roman times, Washington, PA, Will T. Creigh's Print
- McKeag, A. J. (1902). The sensation of pain and the theory of the specific sense energies (Vol. 2). Ginn. (dissertation)
- McKeag, A. J., Urban, F. M., & Cornman, O. P. (1902). Spelling in the Elementary School: An Experimental and Statistical Investigation (No. 3). Ginn.
- McKeag, A. J. (1931). The principles of education.
- McKeag, A. J. (1938). Edna Virginia Moffett. (Wellesley magazine: an alumnae publication, 22, 4, 296-298.)
