= Crawford Covered Bridge =

- U.S. National Register of Historic Places
- Washington County History & Landmarks Foundation Landmark
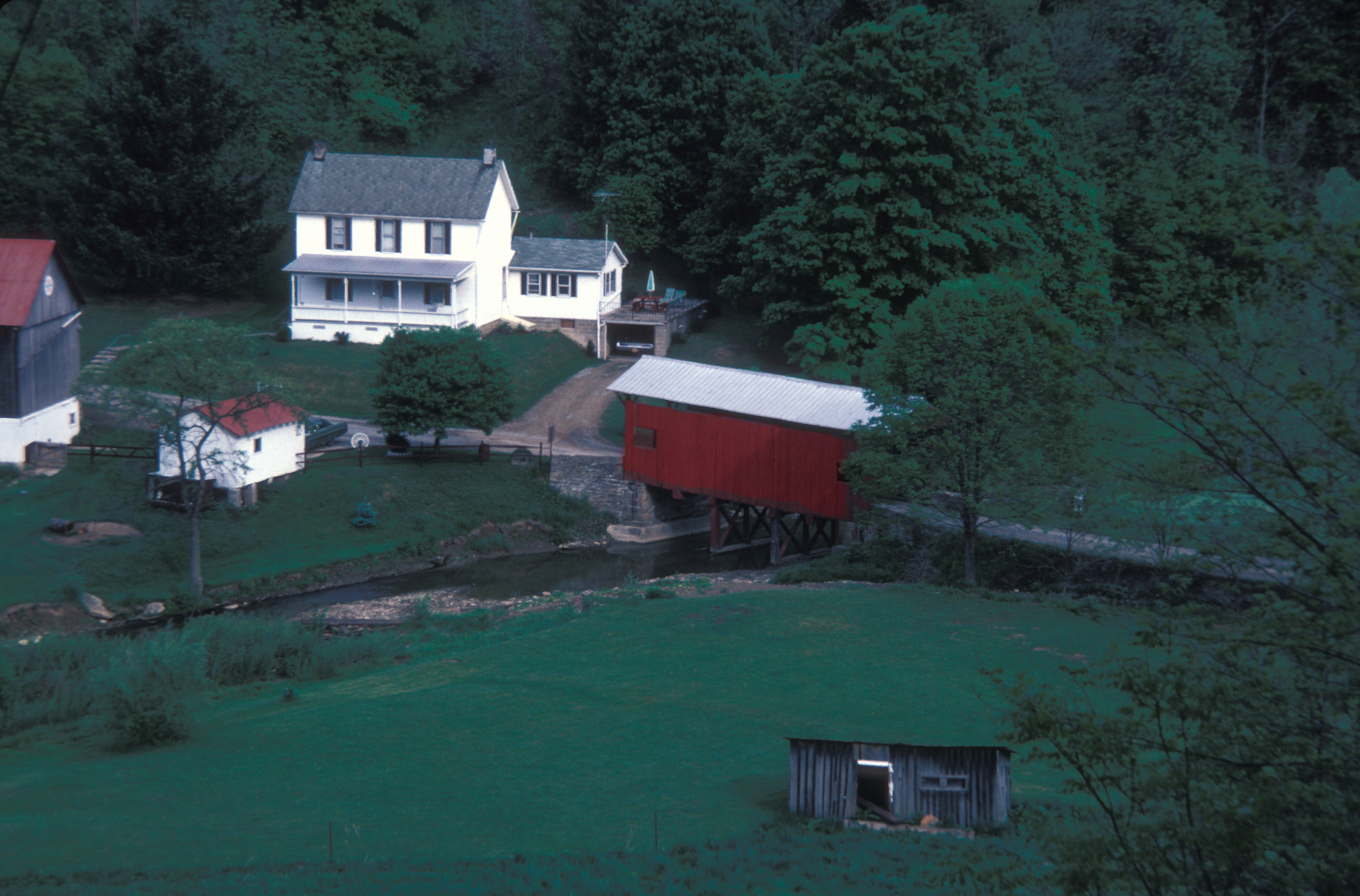

- Location within Pennsylvania Location within the United States
- Nearest city: West Finley, Pennsylvania
- Coordinates: 39.99903°N 80.47268°W
- Area: 0.1 acres (0.040 ha)
- Architectural style: Queenpost truss
- MPS: Covered Bridges of Washington and Greene Counties TR
- NRHP reference No.: 79002361
- Added to NRHP: June 22, 1979

The Crawford Covered Bridge is a historic Queen post truss covered bridge in West Finley, Pennsylvania. The 11 feet 7 inches (3.53 m) by 39 feet (12 m) bridge has high sidewalls, a roof made of sheet metal, and crosswise planking. It is open to traffic across the Robinson Fork of Wheeling Creek.

It is designated as a historic bridge by the Washington County History & Landmarks Foundation.
