= West Finley Township, Pennsylvania =

Township in Pennsylvania, US

Coordinates: 40°01′23″N 80°27′49″W

West Finley Township
- Township
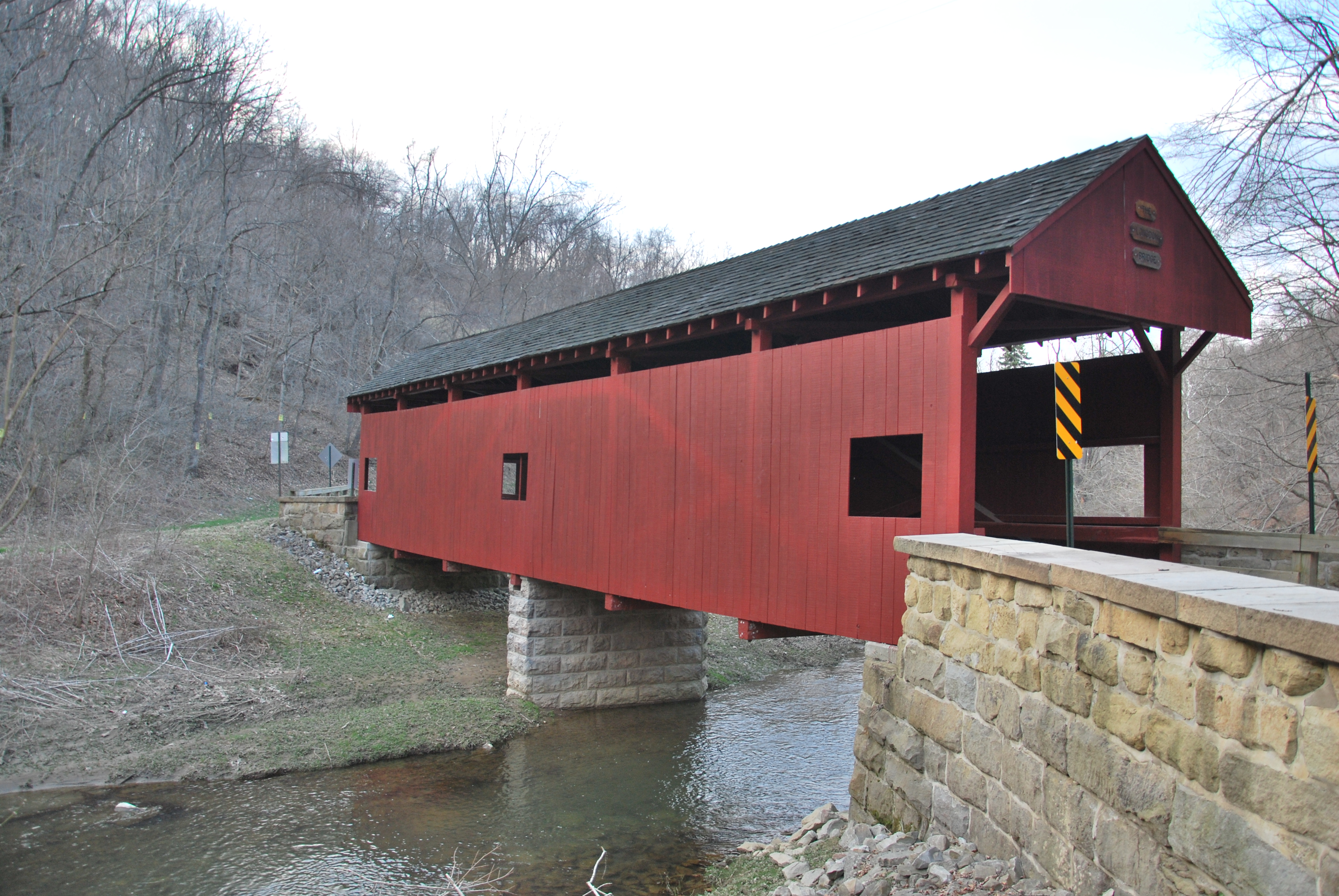
- Longdon L. Miller Covered Bridge; National Register of Historic Places

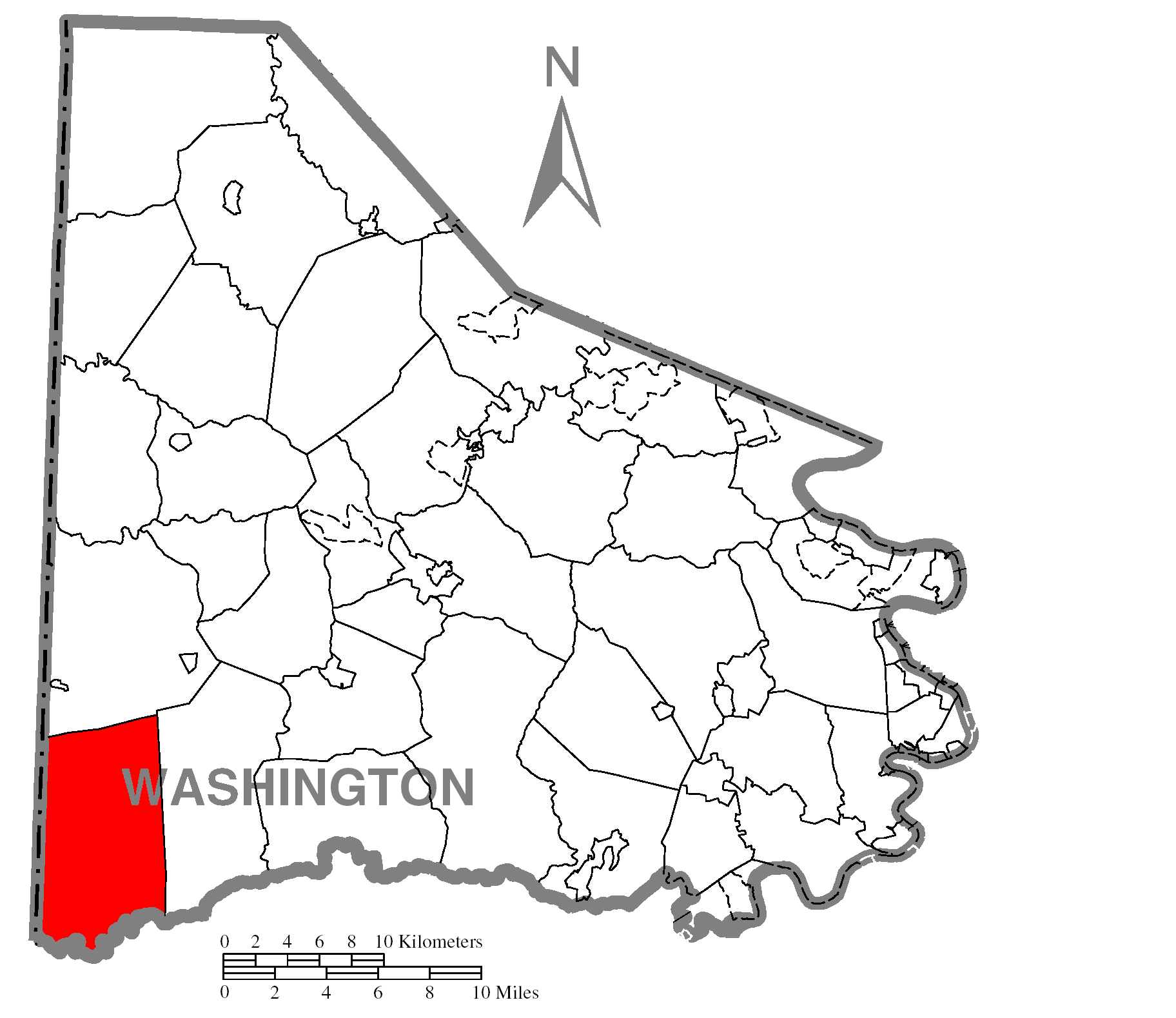
- Location of West Finley Township in Washington County

- Location of Washington County in Pennsylvania
- Country: United States
- State: Pennsylvania
- County: Washington County

Area
  - Total: 39.12 sq mi (101.32 km^{2})
  - Land: 39.12 sq mi (101.32 km^{2})
  - Water: 0 sq mi (0.00 km^{2})

Population (2020)
  - Total: 813 ▼
  - Estimate (2021): 814
  - Density: 22.4/sq mi (8.64/km^{2})
- Time zone: UTC-4 (EST)
  - Summer (DST): UTC-5 (EDT)
- Area code: 724
- FIPS code: 42-125-83000
- Website: https://westfinleypa.com/

Historical population
Census	Pop.	Note	%±
2000	951		—
2010	878		−7.7%
2020	813		−7.4%
2025 (est.)	837		3.0%
U.S. Decennial Census

West Finley Township is a township in Washington County, Pennsylvania, United States. The population was 813 at the 2020 census.

== History ==
The Crawford Covered Bridge, Danley Covered Bridge, Erskine Covered Bridge, and Longdon L. Miller Covered Bridge are listed on the National Register of Historic Places.

== Geography ==
According to the United States Census Bureau, the township has a total area of 39.1 square miles (101 km^{2}), all of it land.

== Demographics ==
As of the census of 2000, there were 951 people, 338 households, and 267 families living in the township. The population density was 24.3 people per square mile (9.4 people/km^{2}). There were 374 housing units at an average density of 9.6 per square mile (3.7/km^{2}). The racial makeup of the township was 98.84% White, 0.11% Native American, 0.21% Asian, and 0.84% from two or more races. Hispanic or Latino of any race were 0.21% of the population.

There were 338 households, out of which 36.4% had children under the age of 18 living with them, 70.4% were married couples living together, 3.8% had a female householder with no husband present, and 21.0% were non-families. 16.9% of all households were made up of individuals, and 7.4% had someone living alone who was 65 years of age or older. The average household size was 2.80 and the average family size was 3.16.

In the township the population was spread out, with 27.2% under the age of 18, 8.2% from 18 to 24, 27.1% from 25 to 44, 26.9% from 45 to 64, and 10.5% who were 65 years of age or older. The median age was 37 years. For every 100 females, there were 110.9 males. For every 100 females age 18 and over, there were 104.7 males.

The median income for a household in the township was $38,333, and the median income for a family was $41,204. Males had a median income of $32,262 versus $19,722 for females. The per capita income for the township was $14,888. About 8.0% of families and 12.3% of the population were below the poverty line, including 13.8% of those under age 18 and 11.0% of those age 65 or over.
