= Foxcroft Building =

Former office building in San Francisco

Coordinates: 37°47′21″N 122°24′12″W

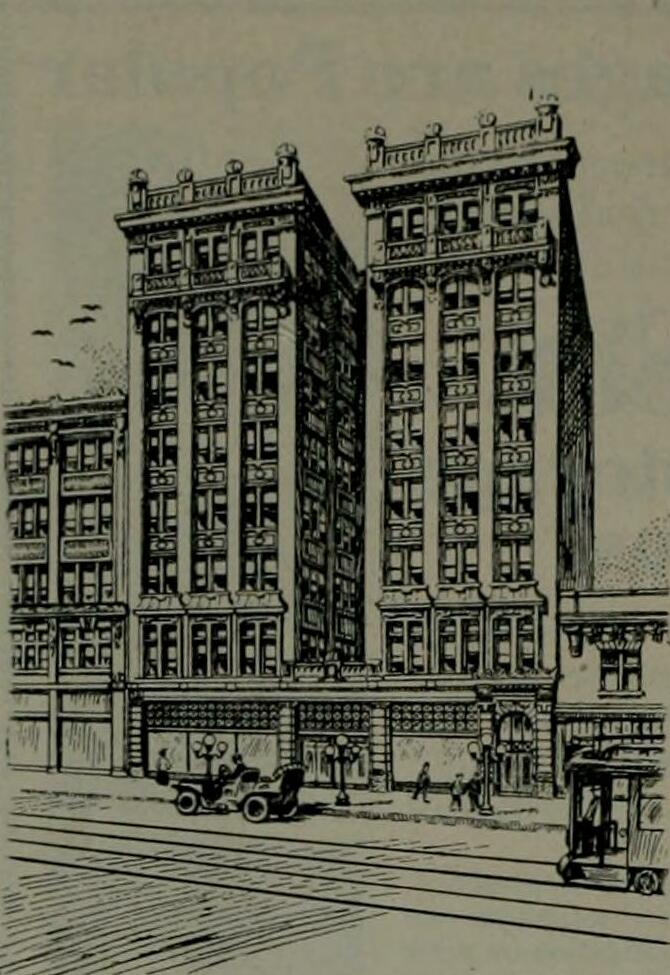
The Foxcroft Building, depicted in 1917

The Foxcroft Building, later known as 68 Post Street, was an office building located near Market Street and Kearny Street in the Union Square neighborhood of San Francisco, California.

== History ==
Mrs. W. F. Morris of Menlo Park arranged for the construction of the building to a design by Kenneth McDonald, Jr. Completed in 1909 and now demolished, it had eight floors above ground and measured 102.38 feet (31.21 m). The Foxcroft Building was owned by capitalist Charles Edward Holmes (1866–1927), who named it the Foxcroft Building, after the settlement in Maine where his family hailed from. After his death, it was renamed 68 Post Street in 1930. The building was razed in 1980 for redevelopment and Montgomery Tower now stands on the site.

== Tenants ==
Office tenants over the years included the American Silk Factors (at 714), the Ray F. Coyle Company (with offices at 725 and 726), the McAlpine Gold Mining and Milling Company (at 820), the Moore Mill & Lumber Company, and architect firm H. H. Larsen & Son. Earl Baldwin Bertz, later primary architect of the Allen & Co., moved into an office at the Foxcroft Building in 1918, working for insurance broker and developer John Brickell.

The building's street level was retail space. For decades, Bill Goldfinger Cameras was at 70 Post Street, adjacent to the office building lobby entrance.
