= BMO =

BMO may refer to:

- Bank of Montreal, a Canadian bank
- BMO Bank, an American subsidiary of the Bank of Montreal
- BMO (Adventure Time), a character in the animated television series Adventure Time
- "BMO" (Adventure Time: Distant Lands), a television episode of the animated series
- "BMO" (song), a song by American singer Ari Lennox
- Balkan Mathematical Olympiad, an international contest for students from European countries
- British Mathematical Olympiad, part of the selection process for the UK International Mathematical Olympiad team
- Bloody Mannequin Orchestra, a 1980s punk band from Bethesda, Maryland
- Bounded mean oscillation, in harmonic analysis, a real-valued function whose mean oscillation is bounded
- BMO Field, a stadium located in Toronto, Canada
- BMO, National Rail station code for Birmingham Moor Street railway station in Birmingham, UK
- Bolle med ost (bun with cheese), a typical Danish snack
