= Frederick T. Frelinghuysen =

American lawyer and politician (1817–1885)

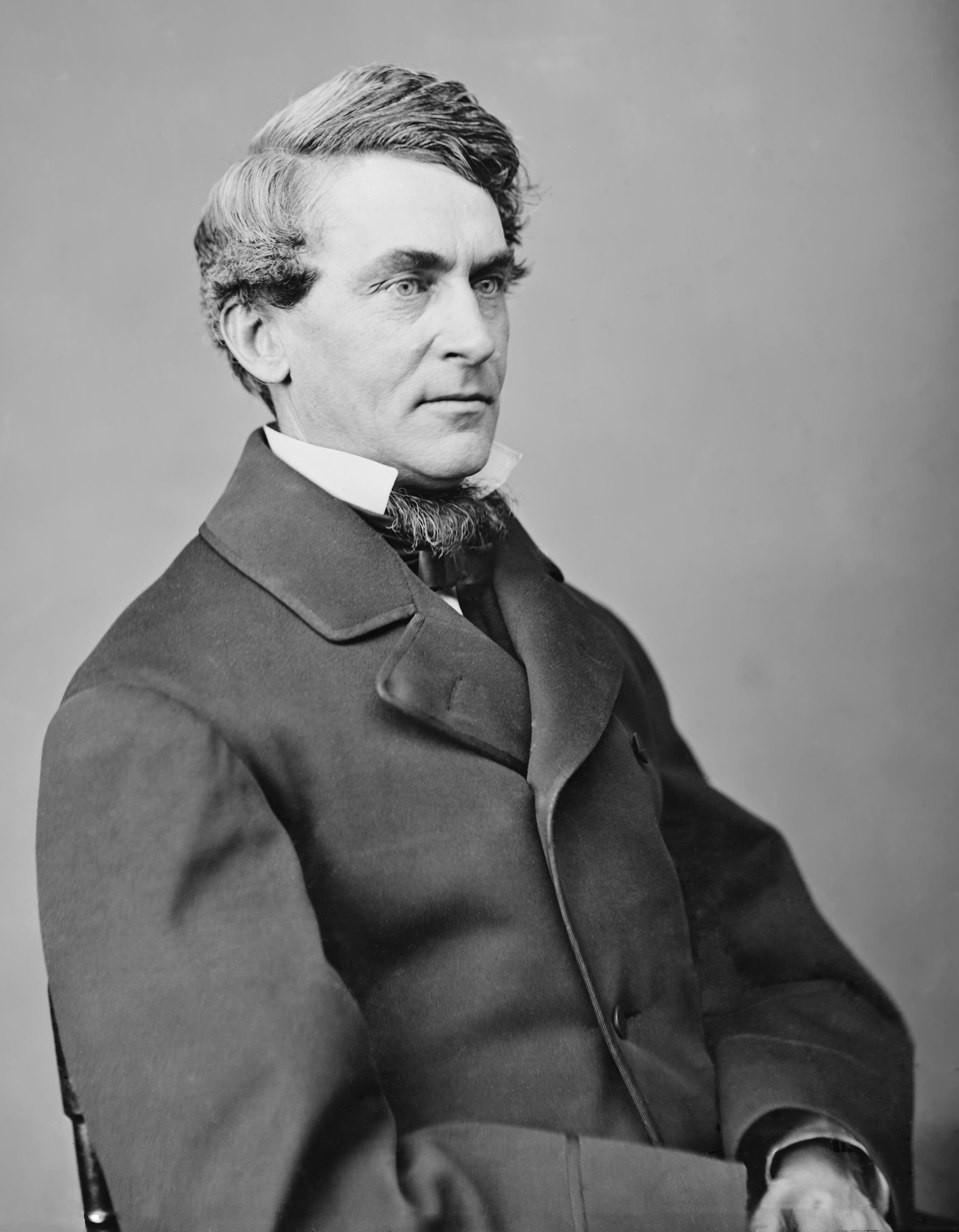
- Frelinghuysen c. 1865–80

29th United States Secretary of State
- In office December 19, 1881 – March 6, 1885
- President: Chester A. Arthur; Grover Cleveland
- Preceded by: James G. Blaine
- Succeeded by: Thomas F. Bayard

United States Senator from New Jersey
- In office March 4, 1871 – March 3, 1877
- Preceded by: Alexander G. Cattell
- Succeeded by: John R. McPherson
- In office November 12, 1866 – March 3, 1869
- Preceded by: William Wright
- Succeeded by: John P. Stockton

22nd Attorney General of New Jersey
- In office 1861–1867
- Governor: Charles Smith Olden; Joel Parker; Marcus Lawrence Ward
- Preceded by: William L. Dayton
- Succeeded by: George M. Robeson

Personal details
- Born: Frederick Theodore Frelinghuysen; August 4, 1817 Millstone, New Jersey, U.S.
- Died: May 20, 1885 (aged 67) Newark, New Jersey, U.S.
- Party: Whig (Before 1860); Republican (1860–death)
- Spouse: Matilda Griswold (m. 1842)
- Children: 6, including Frederick, George
- Relatives: Frelinghuysen family
- Education: Rutgers University, New Brunswick (BA)

Frederick Theodore Frelinghuysen (August 4, 1817 – May 20, 1885) was an American lawyer and politician from New Jersey who served as a U.S. senator and later as United States Secretary of State under President Chester A. Arthur.

Frelinghuysen was born in Millstone, New Jersey, and was adopted by his uncle Theodore Frelinghuysen after his father's death. He graduated from Rutgers College and studied law under his uncle. Frelinghuysen was involved in various political roles, including serving as a delegate to the 1860 Republican National Convention and as Attorney General of New Jersey. He was also appointed to fill a vacancy in the United States Senate.

In 1870, Frelinghuysen was nominated as U.S. ambassador to the United Kingdom but declined the position. He served again as a U.S. Senator from 1871 to 1877, and in 1881, was appointed U.S. Secretary of State by President Chester A. Arthur, serving until 1885. During his tenure, he withdrew the U.S. from the War of the Pacific and negotiated a treaty change with Hawaii, allowing for a naval base at Pearl Harbor.

After his term as Secretary of State, Frelinghuysen returned to Newark, New Jersey, where he died less than three months later. He married Matilda Elizabeth Griswold in 1842, with whom he had six children. Frelinghuysen University in Washington, D.C. was named in his honor in 1917.

== Early life and education ==
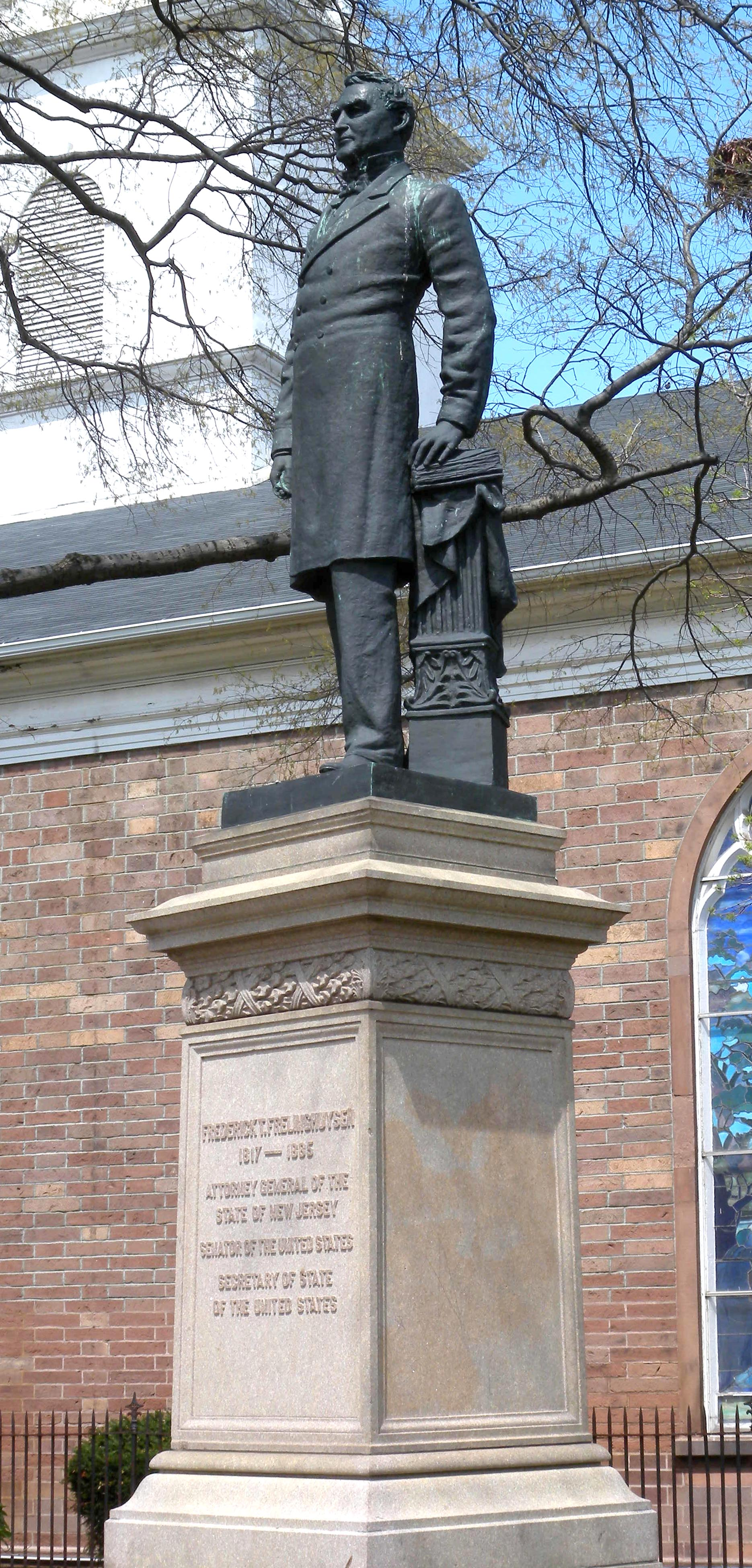
Statue honoring Frelinghuysen in Newark, New Jersey

Frelinghuysen was born in Millstone, New Jersey, to Frederick Frelinghuysen (1788–1820) and Mary Dumont. His father died when he was just three years old, and he was adopted by his uncle, Theodore Frelinghuysen (1787–1862).

His grandfather, Frederick Frelinghuysen (1753–1804), was an eminent lawyer, one of the framers of the first New Jersey Constitution, a soldier in the American Revolutionary War, a member (1778–1779 and 1782–1783) of the Continental Congress from New Jersey, and from 1793 to 1796 a member of the United States Senate.

His uncle, Theodore Frelinghuysen, was Attorney General of New Jersey from 1817 to 1829, was a U.S. Senator from New Jersey from 1829 to 1835, was the Whig candidate for Vice President of the United States on the Henry Clay ticket in the 1844 Presidential election, and was Chancellor of New York University from 1839 until 1850 and president of Rutgers College from 1850 to 1862.

Frelinghuysen graduated from Rutgers College in 1836, and studied law in Newark with his uncle, to whose practice he succeeded in 1839, after he was admitted to the bar.

== Career ==
Following his admission to the bar, he became attorney for the Central Railroad of New Jersey, the Morris Canal and Banking Company and other corporations.

=== Political career ===
According to The New York Times, Frelinghuysen was a member of the Whig Party until joining the Republican Party upon its inception. He was also crucial in establishing the Republican Party in New Jersey.

During the American Civil War, Frelinghuysen was active in public office rather than joining the Union Army. He was a delegate in 1861 to the Peace Congress, and appointed Attorney General of New Jersey by Governor Charles S. Olden that year to serve in the post until 1867. Frelinghuysen was encouraged by some to run for governor in 1862, though he declined.

Frelinghuysen was a delegate to the 1860 Republican National Convention from New Jersey and from 1861 to 1867 was Attorney General of New Jersey. He was a delegate to the Peace conference of 1861 in Washington, and in 1866 was appointed by the Governor of New Jersey, as a Republican, to fill a vacancy in the United States Senate. In the winter of 1867, he was elected to fill the unexpired term, but a Democratic majority in the New Jersey Legislature prevented his re-election in 1869.

In 1870, he was nominated by President Ulysses S. Grant, and confirmed by the Senate, as United States Ambassador to the United Kingdom to succeed John Lothrop Motley, but declined the mission. From 1871 to 1877 he was again a member of the United States Senate, in which he was prominent in debate and in committee work, and was chairman of the U.S. Senate Committee on Foreign Affairs during the Alabama Claims negotiations.

He was a strong opponent of the Reconstruction measures of President Andrew Johnson, for whose conviction he voted in Johnson's impeachment trial. Frelinghuysen supported the Radical Republicans' program for Reconstruction that emphasized a harsh treatment of former Confederates. He later allied with the GOP Stalwart faction whose members tended to utilize corruption/patronage effectively, though was considered to have a clean record.

He was a member of the joint committee which drew up and reported (1877) the Electoral Commission Bill, and subsequently served as a member of the Electoral Commission that decided the 1876 Presidential election. As a Republican, he voted with the eight-member majority on all counts.

==== U.S. Secretary of State ====
On December 12, 1881, he was appointed United States Secretary of State by President Chester A. Arthur to succeed James G. Blaine, and served until the inauguration of President Grover Cleveland in 1885.

Upon taking the post, Frelinghuysen was tasked with resolving a number of consequences resulted by the actions of his predecessor Blaine. Taking a pacifistic and patient approach, he shared the vision held by William H. Seward of the United States dominating the global market in setting an example for other nations to follow, he withdrew the U.S. from the War of the Pacific between Chile and Peru in which his predecessor unsuccessfully backed the Peruvians.

Frelinghuysen's other actions included canceling a scheduled Pan-American conference against President Arthur's wishes that Blaine had originally planned. In addition, he negotiated a treaty change with Hawaii that allowed for a naval base for the U.S. in Pearl Harbor, which was later known for being bombed by Japan in World War II.

In contrast to his predecessors in the position of U.S. Secretary of State, Frelinghuysen proved unable to urge Great Britain to modify the Clayton-Bulwer Treaty terms in a re-negotiation attempt, and instead pushed through a treaty with Nicaragua that would permit the construction of a canal in the country under joint ownership. However, it was withdrawn later during the presidency of Grover Cleveland by the U.S. Senate, which did not ratify it. Other efforts rejected by Congress included proposals to negotiate reciprocity Spain, Mexico, and Santo Dominigo, in addition to opening an international consortium between the Congo, U.S. and other countries.

Frelinghuysen served in the post until the end of President Arthur's term, effectively resigning in early March 1885.

After his term as Secretary of State Frelinghuysen returned to his home in Newark where he died less than three months after retiring.

=== Legacy ===
In 1917, Frelinghuysen University in Washington D.C. was named in honor of his service to African American causes.

== Marriage and children ==
On January 25, 1842, Frelinghuysen married Matilda Elizabeth Griswold (1817–1889). She was the daughter of George Griswold, a merchant in New York City who "made an immense fortune in the time of the clipper trade with China." Together, they were the parents of three daughters and three sons, including:

- Matilda Griswold Frelinghuysen (1846–1926), who married Henry Winthrop Gray (1840–1906), a prominent merchant in 1889.
- Charlotte Louisa "Lucy" Frelinghuysen (1847–1930),
- Frederick Frelinghuysen (1848–1924), who married Estelle B. Kinney, daughter of Thomas T. Kinney, in 1902.
- George Griswold Frelinghuysen (1851–1936), who married Sara Linen Ballantine, granddaughter of Peter Ballantine, in 1881.
- Sarah Helen Frelinghuysen (1856–1939), who first married Judge John J. Davis (1851–1902), the grandson of Massachusetts governor John Davis. After his death, she married Brig. Gen. Charles Laurie McCawley (1865–1935), the son of Charles G. McCawley, the 8th Commandant of the Marine Corps, in 1906.
- Theodore Frelinghuysen (1860–1928), who married Alice Dudley Coats (1861–1889) in 1885. After her death, he married Elizabeth Mary "Lily" (née Thompson) Cannon, a daughter of William G. Thompson and descendant of Elijah Brush, both Mayors of Detroit, and the widow of Henry Lee Grand Cannon.

Frelinghuysen died at Newark on May 20, 1885, aged 67. He was buried at Mount Pleasant Cemetery, Newark. His widow died a few years later in February 1889.

=== Descendants ===
Through his eldest son Frederick, he was the grandfather of George Griswold Frelinghuysen II, who married Anne de Smolianinof; Estelle C. "Suzy" Frelinghuysen, who married fellow painter George Lovett Kingsland Morris; Frederick Frelinghuysen; Thomas Frelinghuysen; and Theodore Frelinghuysen.

Through his daughter Sarah and granddaughter Mathilda Elizabeth Frelinghuysen (née Davis) Lodge (1876–1960), who married George Cabot Lodge, he was the great-grandfather of Henry Cabot Lodge Jr. (1902–1985), the diplomat and United States senator from Massachusetts, and John Davis Lodge (1903–1985), also a diplomat, U.S. Representative, and Governor of Connecticut.

Legal offices
Preceded by William L. Dayton	New Jersey Attorney General; 1861–1866	Succeeded by George M. Robeson
U.S. Senate
Preceded by William Wright	U.S. senator (Class 1) from New Jersey; 1866–1869; Served alongside: Alexander G. Cattell	Succeeded by John P. Stockton
Preceded by Alexander Cattell	U.S. senator (Class 2) from New Jersey; 1871–1877; Served alongside: John P. Stockton, Theodore F. Randolph	Succeeded by John R. McPherson
Political offices
Preceded by James G. Blaine	U.S. Secretary of State; Served under: Chester A. Arthur; 1881–1885	Succeeded by Thomas F. Bayard
