= James Hall Mason Knox =

American academic administrator (1824–1903)

The Reverend James Hall Mason Knox D.D., LL.D
- Born: June 10, 1824; New York City
- Died: January 21, 1903 (aged 78); Baltimore
- Education: Columbia University; New Brunswick Theological Seminary
- Occupation: Presbyterian minister

Ecclesiastical career
- Ordained: September 1846
- Offices held: Lafayette College president 1883–1890

Reverend James Hall Mason Knox D.D., LL.D (June 10, 1824 – January 21, 1903) was a Presbyterian divine and educator, serving as the 8th president of Lafayette College.

== Early life ==
Knox was born in New York City in 1824. His father, Rev. John Knox D.D., was the head pastor of the Collegiate Dutch Church for forty years, and his mother was the eldest daughter of John M. Mason.

Knox attended Columbia College, graduating in 1841, before studying theology at the Seminary of the Reformed Church in New Brunswick, New Jersey. In 1845, he was licensed to preach by the classis of New York, and was ordained in September 1846 by the presbytery of Newton, New Jersey.

== Career ==
Following his ordainment, Knox led an illustrious career as a pastor throughout the northeast. For the first five years, Knox preached at the Presbyterian Church in German Valley, New Jersey, where he was described as "one of the most popular and efficient pastors that the church ever had." He then went to the Reformed Dutch Church in Easton, Pennsylvania, for a period of two years, where he began a relationship with nearby Lafayette College, eventually joining its board of trustees. Following this, he was the pastor for sixteen years at the First Presbyterian Church in Germantown, Pennsylvania, before being transferred to Bristol, Pennsylvania, where he spent the next ten years.

Knox was called out of the ministry while at Bristol to accept the role of president of Lafayette College as its eighth president in 1883. The board of trustees at Lafayette had chosen Knox unanimously upon the resignation of his predecessor, William Cassady Cattell. Cattell, who has just resigned after a long twenty-year tenure, was a popular figure in the city as he helped steady the very financially troubled college during his term. Knox continued in his predecessor's success, by making sure the college's endowment was filled and interest in the school was still high.

In an attempt to raise the college's endowment, Knox was instrumental in securing a donation from Daniel B. Fayerweather, who ran the world's largest leather manufacturing business in the world, known as Fayerweather & Ladew. Fayerweather left many small fortunes to colleges around the country, and to Lafayette he left the amount of $100,000 (equivalent to $3.07 million in 2025 dollars), and later had a dormitory on campus named after him.

Knox resigned the presidency in June, 1890, and spent the next two years in Europe before returning to the United States, choosing to live in Baltimore. He was elected as vice-president of the Presbyterian Historical Society in 1890, a position in which he served until his death.

== Personal life ==
Knox was married twice. His first wife was Louise Wakeman, whom he married on September 17, 1846. Together they had two children, Louise Wakeman Knox (Mrs. Louis C. Tiffany) and Jeanie de Forest Knox (Mrs. William D. Barbour). Mrs. Knox died in Germantown, and on December 16, 1869, Knox married Helen R. Thompson, and together they had one son, John Hall Mason Knox Jr.

In 1861, Knox received the honorary degree of Doctor of Divinity from his alma mater, Columbia College. Later, he received the honorary degree of Legum Doctor from the same college in 1885. He was also a member of the Victoria Institute in London.

After his presidency at Lafayette, the college recognized his service by dedicating to him a building, named Knox Hall.

Knox died of pneumonia on January 21 in his home in Baltimore.

Academic offices
Preceded by William Cassady Cattell	President of Lafayette College; 1883–1890	Succeeded by Traill Green (acting)
