= William Ashburner Cattell =

American civil engineer

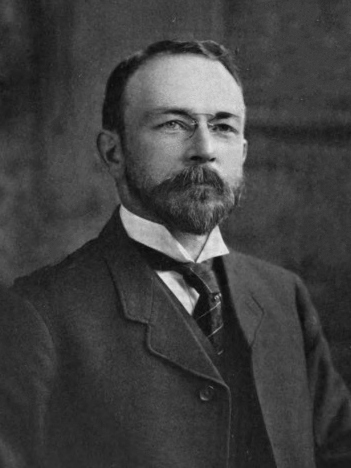
- Born: June 16, 1863; Princeton, New Jersey, US
- Died: October 10, 1920 (aged 57); Alhambra, California, US
- Resting place: Mountain View Cemetery and Mausoleum (Altadena, California)
- Education: Lafayette College

William Ashburner Cattell (June 16, 1863 – October 10, 1920) was a U.S. civil engineer. He served as President of the Petaluma and Santa Rosa Railroad.

== Early years ==
Cattell was born on June 16, 1863, at Princeton, New Jersey, the son of Anna Ashburner and Thomas Ware Cattell. His boyhood and youthful days were spent in Lincoln, Pennsylvania, where his father held an honored position with the University. In 1880, Cattell entered the Pardee Scientific Department of Lafayette College and completed the four-year course there, having been graduated in 1884 with the degree of Civil Engineer.

== Career ==
Immediately after his graduation he began the active practice of his profession and during the next five years was engaged in making surveys and valuations of the railroad and canal property in the State for the State Board of Railroad Assessors of New Jersey. During this period he also served the Atchison, Topeka and Santa Fe Railway Company on preliminary and location surveys in Kansas and Indian Territory.

Returning East in 1889, he served, until 1897, with the Long Island Rail Road as Assistant Chief Engineer in charge of the Construction Department, which detail included the practical reconstruction of the road and the design and construction of bridges, buildings, docks, piers, and terminals incident to the reconstruction and extensions.

Severing his connection with the Long Island Railroad in 1897, Cattell opened an office as Consulting Engineer in New York City and until 1905 was engaged in the general practice of his profession, serving during that time as Consulting Engineer for the Brooklyn Park Department for bridge construction; the Ohio Southern Railroad for bridges and general improvement; and the Manhattan Beach Company for the installation of electric light, power, and refrigerating plant, electric railroad, marine bulkheads, and shore protection.

During this time he was associated with prominent New York engineers in the valuation of many manufacturing plants, and made reports covering important existing and projected railways as well as terminals. He also reported on extensive irrigation projects since constructed by the United States Reclamation Service, and on a number of water supply and power projects in various parts of the United States. He prepared estimates for bids for various concerns on extensive improvements, such as the Atlantic Branch of the Long Island Rail Road; the portion of the New York City Subway's Lexington Avenue and Eastern Parkway lines from the Brooklyn Bridge–City Hall station at New York City Hall to the Atlantic Avenue station at Flatbush Avenue, Brooklyn, including the Joralemon Street Tunnel under the East River; and the track elevation of the New York Central Railroad at Schenectady, New York. He also assisted in the examination of the new filtration plants, pumping stations, and aqueduct tunnel of the Philadelphia Water-Works.

Many other services were performed by Cattell while he was engaged in the practice of his profession as Consulting Engineer in New York City, and the foregoing only illustrates the nature and scope of his work up to the time that he became associated with the firm of E. H. Rollins and Sons, of San Francisco, California, which firm he served as Consulting Engineer from 1905 to 1908, making examinations and reports, for bond purposes, on various steam and electric railroads, among the latter being the Western Pacific Railroad. It was during these years that he served as President of the Petaluma and Santa Rosa Electric Railway.

From 1908 to 1917, Oattell was engaged in general practice in San Francisco, with offices in the Foxcroft Building. He made a reconnaissance survey and report on the Valdez-Yukon Railroad project in Alaska, valuations of the Oakland Water-Works System, Oakland, Cal., the Oakland Traction System, and the Los Angeles City Railway System, as well as other valuations covering railways, power, and gas plants. His particular interest in water-front and harbor improvements caused him to be retained by the San Francisco-Oakland Terminal Railways to report on its Terminal Pier with special reference to the effects of salt water on concrete piers, and, later, as Consulting Engineer for the same Company, in connection with the terminal and harbor developments.

It was during these years that he made a reconnaissance survey for the United States Forest Service of a railway line along the Klamath River, California; served as Consulting Engineer for the Peoples Water Company, Oakland, California, and for the Los Angeles Railway Corporation, with special reference to valuation matters. He made a valuation of the Honolulu Rapid Transit and Land Company, Honolulu, Hawaii, and a valuation of the properties of the Oahu Railway and Land Company, also in Hawaii.

One of his works was in connection with the Committee of Management of the International Engineering Congress, for which he acted as Secretary-Treasurer from March 1913, to the practical close of the work of the Committee in the fall of 1916. During this period, Cattell devoted much of his time to the duties devolving on him in this connection, and during 1915–16 he worked almost entirely on this project. Being responsible for the organization and general management of the office of the Congress during these years, he gave significant effort to the requirements of the work, with special reference to all matters connected with general organization, with publicity, and with the collection and handling of funds. The publications of the Congress include a volume of general proceedings, with a history of the organization and development of the Congress from its initial inception to its final distribution of printed volumes of proceedings. This volume was prepared almost entirely by Cattell and furnishes in condensed form a record of this great undertaking. The success of this Congress was due in large degree to the work with which Cattell performed the duties of Secretary-Treasurer of the Committee of Management of the Congress.

With the first call of the Government for the formation of an Engineer Officers' Reserve Corps early in 1917, Cattell enrolled and was commissioned a Major of Engineers on March 1, 1917. This was followed by the entrance of the United States in the World War, and Major Cattell was ordered to report for duty at Camp Lee, Virginia, on January 5, 1918.

Early in the summer of 1918, he was transferred from the Training Camp to the Office of the Chief of Engineers, at Washington, D. C., to organize the Section of Historical and Statistical Data. Under his able guidance the Section collected and put into permanent form all historical and statistical information concerning every unit of engineers, from the date its organization was first proposed in the memoranda of General Pershing or the General Staff, through its authorization, mobilization, training, and shipment overseas, to the date on which it was finally mustered out. The data thus collected should be invaluable as a guide in the organization of American engineering forces should history ever repeat itself.

With the retirement of Major Cattell, on September 30, 1919, from the United States Army, ill health overtook him, and he did not again take up the active practice of the profession of civil engineering. He spent some months in Philadelphia, Pennsylvania, and returned to California in January 1920, where he resided in Alhambra until his death, after a long illness, on October 10, 1920.

== Personal life ==
In 1889, Cattell was married, at Lincoln, Pennsylvania, to Jennie Woodhull. They had three children, Gilbert Woodhull, Anna Ashburner, and Dorothy.

He was a member of the Phi Delta Theta fraternity, and the Masons. Among the professional societies he belonged to were: the American Society of Mechanical Engineers, the American Institute of Consulting Engineers, the Pacific Association of Consulting Engineers, the American Water Works Association, the Institution of Civil Engineers (Great Britain), and the American Railway Engineering Association. Cattell was elected a Member of the American Society of Civil Engineers on October 7, 1896, and served as a Director from 1912 to 1914.
