= Leslie Freeman Gates =

American businessman

Leslie F. Gates
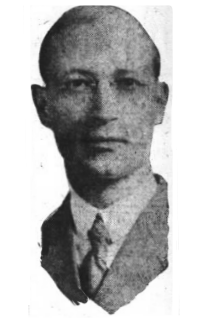
- Born: December 21, 1873; Canton, Pennsylvania
- Died: October 18, 1928 (aged 54); Battle Creek, Michigan
- Education: Lafayette College
- Occupation: Businessman
- Known for: President of Chicago Board of Trade 1919–1920

Leslie Freeman Gates (December 21, 1873 – October 18, 1928) was an American businessman mainly involved in the grain trade who served as a director of the Chicago Board of Trade from 1911 to 1919 and its president from 1919 to 1920.

== Biography ==
Gates was born in Canton, Pennsylvania, on December 21, 1873, where he began his education at the Susquehanna Collegiate Institute in Towanda. He then attended Lafayette College where he was a member of Delta Upsilon, and graduated in 1897. Gates' first job was with Harper and Brothers in New York City where he worked for one year before being transferred to its Chicago branch for two more years. In 1899 he was made the assistant manager to the Chicago branch of D. Appleton & Company and within a short amount of time was promoted to manager. As manager, Gates increased the reach of D. Appleton to much of the mid-west.

In 1906 Gates joined the Lamson Brothers and Company where he became acquainted with the Chicago Board of Trade. He joined the board as a director starting in 1911 and became its president in 1919, becoming reelected in 1920. Gates was requested to run for a third term but declined, instead choosing to retire from the grain industry. Despite leaving the industry, Gates took a stand against the Grain Futures Act of 1922, claiming it would "paralyze the present grain marketing machinery without providing an adequate substitute."

For the final years of Gates' career he served as president of the Laurel Book Company in Laurel, Indiana, and the secretary and treasurer of the Aberdeen Elevator Company.

== Dedications ==
Gates was known for his charities and philanthropies towards young students hoping to attend college. He was a trustee for Lafayette College, his alma mater, and New Trier High School, and both institutions chose to dedicate areas on their campuses in his honor.

In 1928, the year of Gates' death, New Trier High School constructed a new gymnasium that was dedicated to his nine years spent on the board of the school.

On June 8, 1929 Lafayette College announced they would be constructing a new dormitory on campus in dedication of Gates' many years as a trustee to the college. The first cornerstone of the building was laid on the college's Founder's Day on October 17, 1930, and the building was dedicated on May 20, 1931, as Gates Hall.

== Personal life ==
Gates married Josephine Lamson on December 21, 1903, shortly before he joined the Lamson Brothers and Company. Together they had one daughter, Helen Gates.

He died on October 18, 1928, in Battle Creek, Michigan, following a coronary thrombosis.
