= William Cassady Cattell =

American Presbyterian divine and educator

The Reverend William Cassady Cattell
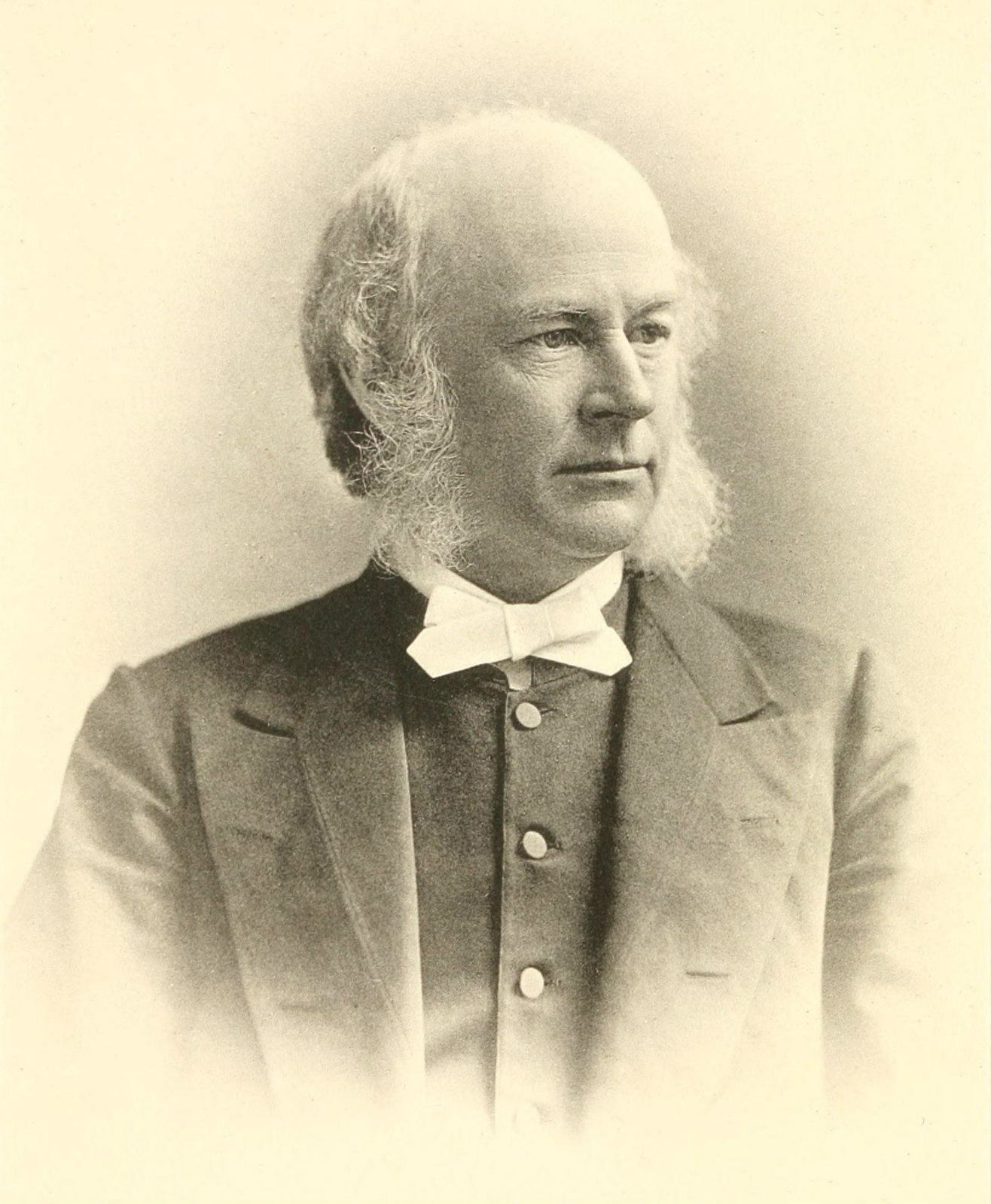
- Born: August 30, 1827; Salem, New Jersey, U.S.
- Died: February 11, 1898 (aged 70); Philadelphia, Pennsylvania, U.S.
- Occupation: Presbyterian minister
- Spouse: Elizabeth McKeen
- Children: 2, including James McKeen Cattell
- Relatives: Alexander G. Cattell (brother)

Academic background
- Education: Princeton College; Princeton Theological Seminary

Signature
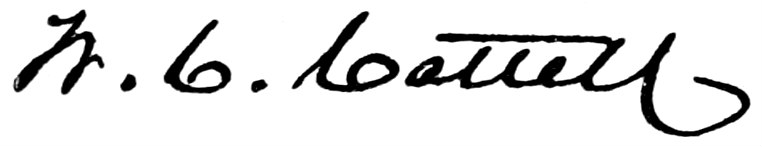

William Cassady Cattell (August 30, 1827 – February 11, 1898) was a Presbyterian divine and educator of the United States and the 7th president of Lafayette College.

== Early life and education ==
Cattell was born in Salem, New Jersey, on August 30, 1827, to Thomas and Keziah Cattell, a merchant and banker, respectively. He had five brothers and two sisters, one of his brothers, Alexander G. Cattell, later served as a New Jersey state senator.

Cattell started his schooling in Salem before studying for two years in Virginia under his older brother, Thomas, who later became a professor at Lincoln University in Oxford, Pennsylvania. He then returned to New Jersey, where he attended the College of New Jersey, which is now Princeton University, and graduated with high honors in 1848. He returned to Princeton the following year to attend the Princeton Theological Seminary, where he graduated in 1852. Following his graduation, he spent an extra year at the seminary to take further part in Oriental studies under professor Joseph Addison Alexander.

== Career ==
Cattell's first job was as the associate principal at the Edgehill Preparatory School in Princeton, New Jersey, where he worked for two years. In 1855, he a position teaching Latin and Greek at nearby Lafayette College in Easton, Pennsylvania. Cattell taught at Lafayette College for five years. In 1860, he resigned to become a pastor at the Pine Street Presbyterian Church in Harrisburg, Pennsylvania.

=== Lafayette College president ===
With the onset of the American Civil War, Lafayette College saw a drastic reduction in its student population, and therefore struggled financially to stay afloat. In 1863, nearing bankruptcy, the college's board of trustees reached out to Cattell, then practicing in Harrisburg, asking him to return to the school in an effort to save it from economic ruin. Cattell accepted the call later that year and was officially inaugurated as the college's seventh president in July 1864.

Cattell's main role as president was to secure an endowment and find monies to keep the college solvent. In 1864, less than a year after his inauguration, Cattell secured a $20,000 gift (equivalent to $325,499 in 2024 dollars), from coal magnate Ario Pardee, which lead the charge for more donations to bring the college's assets from $40,000 to almost $900,000. Cattell later took a sabbatical with Pardee's son, Ario Pardee Jr. in Europe to learn the practices of their institutions and bring back some of their knowledge to implement at Lafayette.

During his time as president, Cattell also taught courses in Mental and Moral Philosophy, and instituted a series of courses centered around the Bible. He also took on responsibility for the campus's literary and social clubs, as well as its religious obligations. These extra tasks, alongside the presidency, took a toll on Cattell, who retired in 1883 having served as the president for 20 years.

=== Retirement ===
During Cattell's retirement, he continued to travel to Europe, familiarizing himself with the Presbyterian Church in Europe. In 1884 he became the Secretary of the Board of Ministerial Relief of the Presbyterian Church, which led him to travel the country raising money for widows, orphans, and other suffering individuals. In his time on this board he helped raise over three million dollars.

== Other accomplishments ==
In 1864, Cattell received the honorary Doctor of Divinity degree from both Hanover College and Princeton University. In 1878 he received the honorary degree of Legum Doctor from Wooster University. He was also made a director of the Princeton Theological Seminary in 1864, and the president of the Presbyterian History Society in 1890. Cattell Street, located in Easton, Pennsylvania, was named after him as well. He was elected as a member to the American Philosophical Society in 1871.

== Personal life ==
Cattell married Elizabeth McKeen, the daughter of Lafayette College board of trustees member James McKeen. Together they had two sons, Henry Ware Cattell, and James McKeen Cattell, the first professor of psychology at the University of Pennsylvania, and later a professor at Columbia University.

== Death ==
Cattell died on February 11, 1898, at his home in Philadelphia, due to complications stemming from heart conditions.

Academic offices
Preceded by George Wilson McPhail	President of Lafayette College; 1863–1883	Succeeded by James Hall Mason Knox
