= John Douglas Bemo =

John Douglas Bemo (1824?–1890) was a Seminole Presbyterian and Baptist missionary. He was the son of a chief and nephew of Osceola. In 1834 he was kidnapped and pressed into service as a sailor for the next eight years. In 1842 he met the pastor of the Mariner's Church in Philadelphia who arranged for his education and return to the Seminole in 1843.
