= Fred Morgan Kirby =

Fred Morgan Kirby (1861–1940) from Wilkes-Barre, Pennsylvania was the founder of the F. M. Kirby & Co. 5 & 10-cent Store chain, and a philanthropist. Kirby’s company was a major rival of the much larger F. W. Woolworth & Co. and the two businesses merged in 1912. Fred Kirby became a Vice President of the F. W. Woolworth & Co., which was listed on the New York Stock Exchange.

== Early life ==
Fred Morgan Kirby was born in Brownsville, New York in 1861. At fifteen, as a clerk at Moore & Smith in Watertown, New York, Kirby’s employers introduced him to 5 and 10-cent selling. Stores around the United States began selling slow-moving merchandise at low prices. Moore & Smith tried the innovative idea by setting up temporary displays of cheap goods to clear shelves. Kirby paid attention to the business idea, formulating how he could create a similar business.

== Business model ==
The design of the 5 and 10-cent business model would follow Kirby’s stores from inception to end. No item was more than 10 cents. Shoppers purchased products in large quantities, enabling Kirby to sell goods below their manufactured prices.

== Beginning of a business ==
After working for eight years, Kirby had saved up $500. With an additional $100 from his father, Kirby moved to Wilkes-Barre, Pennsylvania in 1884 with Charles Sumner Woolworth, his future business partner, to invest his money in a new company. On September 1, 1884, Woolworth & Kirby opened on East Market Street in Wilkes-Barre. The store was a small, dirty room with no shelves or counters. Kirby painted the walls and made shelves and counters himself. He set out his products on his shelving and marked each item five or ten cents.

=== Starting out ===
Customers who came into Woolworth & Kirby laughed at the makeshift counters. Others claimed the merchandise was not good quality because of the low prices. Neighboring merchants claimed the two men wouldn’t stay in business long.

Kirby spent the early part of 1885 borrowing money from his neighbors to pay shipping charges. The situation discouraged Kirby, but he was not defeated. Kirby once said in a newspaper interview that after encountering a disabled man on the street, Kirby decided to forget his misfortune. Thus, Fred Morgan Kirby resolved to reach out to his customers and own one of the nicest stores in Wilkes-Barre.

=== Kirby the businessman ===
Kirby knew that if wanted his customers to purchase his products, they needed to trust him. He engaged with his clientele and demonstrated the value of his products. Kirby slowly won over his customers with his sincere attitude and “quiet sense of humor.” He transformed into a businessman with whom people were delighted to speak.

Customers who once entered the store to mock Kirby began to buy his products. Newspaper articles state that customers saw that his products were good value for the quality and returned to Woolworth & Kirby to see his new stock. Customers began to actively shop at Woolworth & Kirby. At the end of 1886, Kirby and Woolworth divided their first profit.

=== Employees ===
F. M. Kirby employed about 2,000 people. Kirby trained employees to bring out “qualities in them that were important factors in the company’s business.” He shared the business’ profit with employees who were with the company for a year or more. Kirby’s employees also did not fear losing their jobs if illness struck. Kirby would help pay a sick employee’s medical bills and provide sick pay. Additionally, Christmas bonuses were given in proportion to workers’ years of service. The longer an employee was with the business, the more money they would receive. Kirby even provided time off with pay during the holidays.

=== An expanding venture ===
In 1885, Fred Kirby bought out Charles Sumner Woolworth. In 1888, Kirby opened a second store in Williamsport, Pennsylvania. The store’s success led to a third. Kirby began opening a new store every four months and operated as F. M. Kirby & Co. Then, Kirby expanded his company to include stores in Indiana, Illinois, Kentucky, Michigan, Virginia, West Virginia, North Carolina, South Carolina and Louisiana. By 1911, Kirby owned 96 stores with a capital of about $5,000,000.

In 1912, F. M. Kirby & Co. merged with the larger F. W. Woolworth that owned 300 stores, to create F. W. Woolworth Co. The resulting F. W. Woolworth Co. had a capital of over $65,000,000. While prices rose on almost all other products in other stores, the “variety and value of merchandise offered by the Woolworth stores [were] constantly increasing.”

A Republican, Kirby was a presidential elector in 1920.

== Philanthropy ==
F. M. Kirby was a philanthropist, spending money to enhance the Commonwealth. The Kirby family’s crest bears the phrase facta non verba, meaning “deeds not words.” Kirby created the Angeline Elizabeth Kirby Memorial Health Center to make life better and more enjoyable for everyone. When Wilkes-Barre bought land for what would become Kirby Park, F. M. Kirby contributed $87,000 for the development and maintenance of the recreational space.

Kirby donated large sums of money to high schools and colleges to provide better education. Wyoming Seminary received a donation so civil rights could be taught. Kirby also sent a $100,000 endowment to Lafayette College. In addition, he donated $900,000 to Swarthmore College to build a laboratory and create a lasting endowment.

== Death ==
Kirby died in Wilkes-Barre on October 16, 1940.

Wilkes-Barre, Pennsylvania has many buildings that bear F. M. Kirby’s name. Wilkes University has a building named Kirby Hall. F.M. Kirby and Co. signs and markings are still displayed at his first store, now a Barnes & Noble. Kirby Park (The only land west of the Susquehanna River that is owned by the city) is Kirby’s namesake after his donation. Also, the F. M. Kirby Center bears Kirby’s name in his honor.

Furthermore, the F.M. Kirby Math and Science Center at The Lawrenceville School bears his name.
