= Alan L. Hoffman =

American government official (born 1966)

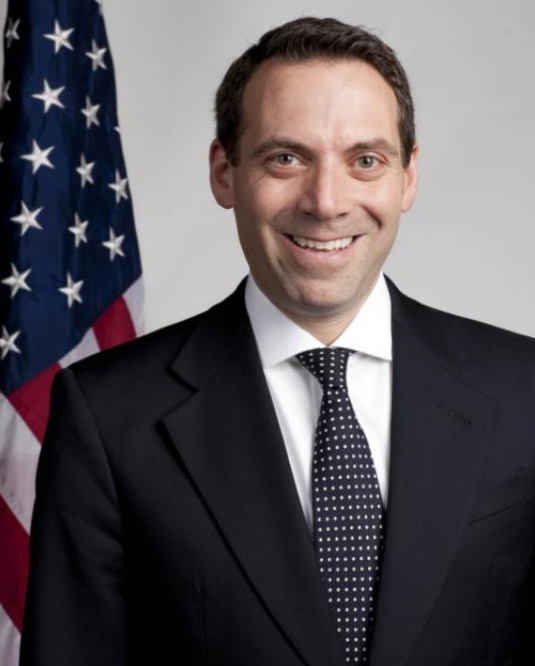

Deputy Chief of Staff to the Vice President of the United States
- In office January 2009 – November 2012
- President: Barack Obama
- Vice President: Joe Biden
- Succeeded by: Shailagh J. Murray

Personal details
- Born: Alan Lawrence Hoffman; April 7, 1966 (age 60)
- Party: Democratic
- Spouse: Lizzie Francis
- Education: Lafayette College (BA); University of Southern California (MPA, JD)

Alan Lawrence Hoffman (born April 7, 1966) is an American lawyer, government official, and corporate executive who is chief policy officer at U.S. electric vehicle manufacturer Rivian.

Prior to joining Rivian, Hoffman held executive positions at Carvana, Herbalife, and PepsiCo, and served as Deputy Chief of Staff to the Vice President of the United States Joe Biden and Deputy Assistant to the President. While in the Vice President's office, Hoffman worked on a variety of domestic policy issues and managed congressional, intergovernmental and political affairs, marking the third time Hoffman had worked for Joe Biden. Previously, Hoffman was chief of staff to Senator Biden from 1998 to 2003 and from 2006 to 2008 while Biden was running for president.

Hoffman sits on several non-profit boards supporting education, homelessness and young people.

== Life and education ==
Hoffman received his B.A. in American Civilization from Lafayette College in Easton, Pennsylvania and his J.D. and M.P.A. from the USC Gould School of Law and the USC Price School of Public Policy, respectively.

Hoffman is married to Lizzie Francis and lives in Los Angeles.

== Career ==
Hoffman is credited with helping Biden secure passage of numerous pieces of legislation including the criminal provisions of Sarbanes-Oxley and legislation closing the gap in sentencing between crack and powder cocaine.

In 2008, after Biden withdrew from the presidential race, Hoffman was the Senior Vice President for External Relations for the University of California system.

Earlier in his career, Hoffman was Vice President for External Relations at the RAND Corporation, Vice President at Timmons and Company, Assistant United States Attorney in Philadelphia, Special Counsel to the Assistant Attorney General at the Department of Justice, Special Counsel to the Assistant Secretary at the Department of Health and Human Services and an attorney at the law firms Pepper, Hamilton and Scheetz.

== See also ==
- R. J. Scaringe
- Office of the Vice President of the United States
