= Cattell =

Cattell may refer to:

== People ==
- Alexander G. Cattell, (February 12, 1816 – April 8, 1894), former United States senator from New Jersey.
- Alfred Cattell, (born 1857) Wales international rugby player
- James McKeen Cattell, the first psychology professor in the United States, father of Psyche Cattell
- Psyche Cattell, (August 2, 1893 – April 1989), American psychologist
- Raymond Cattell, psychologist, (20 March 1905 – 2 February 1998), did major work in a variety of psychological research fields.
- Richard Cattell (disambiguation), several people
- William Cassady Cattell, President of Lafayette College from 1863 to 1883.

== Places ==
- Cattell Street, in Easton, Pennsylvania

== Science ==
- Cattell Culture Fair III, an IQ test constructed by Raymond Cattell, tested for both fluid and crystallized intelligence.
- Cattell–Horn–Carroll theory, a psychological theory.
- Cattell Infant Intelligence Scale, a developmental intelligence test for young children
