= Jaques Cattell =

American publisher (1904–1960)

Jaques (Jack) Cattell (June 2, 1904 – December 18, 1960) was an American publisher and founder of a company bearing his name, "Jaques Cattell Press, Inc.," based in Lancaster, Pennsylvania.

== Jaques Cattell Press, Inc. ==
=== The Science Press ===
There were two well-known psychologists in Lancaster, Pennsylvania, James McKeen Cattell, PhD (1860–1944) and his daughter Psyche Cattell, EdD (1893–1988).

Alexander Graham Bell (1847–1922) and Thomas Edison (1847–1931) began a publication called Science in about 1880. Science failed twice before James McKeen Cattell resurrected it in 1895. Cattell established 1901 "The Science Press" in New York City to publish Science and other journals. Under Cattell's direction, the press also began publishing The Biographical Directory of American Men of Science. In 1923, James McKeen Cattell began The Science Press Printing Co. in Lancaster, primarily because the city was an established printing center. The business eventually moved to 20 McGovern Avenue, a building across from the Pennsylvania Railroad Station. Much of that building has been demolished.

=== Jaques Cattell Press ===
James Cattell's son, Jaques, founded the Jaques Cattell Press in the 1930s and began publishing works of popular science in his father's Lancaster plant. James remained in New York, living upstate along the Hudson River and working on Science Press materials in an office in Grand Central Terminal in New York City. When World War II began, the press operations began to ration and consolidate operations. James gave his home to his oldest son, McKeen Cattell (1891–1983), closed the office in Grand Central Terminal, moved to Lancaster and built a large apartment on top of the printing plant on McGovern Avenue. James died there in 1944. The printing plant was sold to Hughes Printing Corp. to settle the estate. It was renamed "The Business Press, Incorporated", and published prestigious magazines such as Foreign Affairs and Commentary. In 1947, Walter L. Connor took over as president of Lancaster Business Press. The Connor family lived in the Cattell apartment from 1947 to 1980. The apartment had 16 rooms and four stone fireplaces.

When the printing plant was sold to Hughes, James Cattell's son, Jaques, kept the name of Science Press. In the mid-1950s, James sold Science Press to Hughes, which moved it to Ephrata, where it remains as a division of Cadmus Communications Corp. Hudson Cattell (born 1931) worked as publications manager for Science Press from 1953 to 1958.

Jaques Cattell moved to Phoenix, Arizona, and continued operating the Jaques Cattell Press. He died in 1960. That same year, R. R. Bowker acquired Jaques Cattell Press, where it continued to operate out of Tempe, Arizona. Daniel Melcher (1912–1985), a senior executive of R. R. Bowker, became president of Jaques Cattell Press in 1961. Xerox Corporation acquired R. R. Bowker on January 1, 1968. The name, "Jaques Cattell Press," continued as a Division of RR Bowker, A Xerox Company. In 1985, Xerox sold RR Bowker to Reed International. In 1981, Cambridge Information Group acquired R. R. Bowker.
