= American Men and Women of Science =

Biographical dictionary since 1906

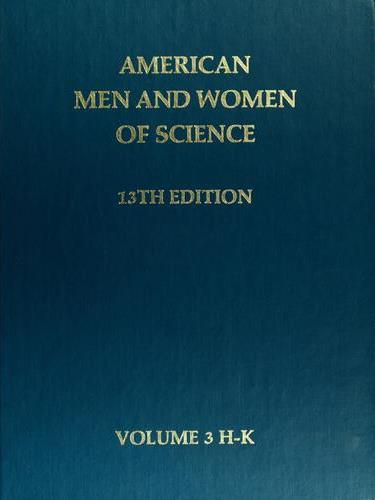
- Author: James McKeen Cattell; Jaques Cattell
- Original title: American Men of Science
- Language: English
- Published: 1906
- Publisher: Bowker (1906), Gale
- Publication place: United States
- OCLC: 1031596093

American Men and Women of Science is a biographical reference work on leading scientists in the United States and Canada, published as a series of books and online by Gale. The first edition was published in 1906, named American Men of Science; the work broadened its title to include women in 1971. (However, three women, Grace Andrews, Charlotte Angas Scott, and Alice Eastwood were listed in the first edition of American Men of Science in 1906.)

American Men and Women of Science profiles living persons in the physical and biological fields, as well as public health scientists, engineers, mathematicians, statisticians, and computer scientists. According to the publisher, those listed met four criteria: (1) Distinguished achievement, by reason of experience, training or accomplishment, including contributions to literature, coupled with continuing activity in scientific work; (2) Research activity of high quality in science as evidenced by publication in reputable scientific journals; (3) for those whose work cannot be published due to governmental or industrial security, research activity of high quality in science as evidenced by the judgment of the individual's peers; or (4) Attainment of a position of substantial responsibility requiring scientific training and experience.

Booklist described American Men and Women of Science as the "Cadillac of scientific biography". WorldTrade wrote that American Men and Women of Science "... remains without peer as a chronicle of scientific endeavor and achievement in the United States and Canada."

Scientists who are not citizens of the United States or Canada are included if a significant portion of their work was performed in North America.

== Background ==
It was first compiled as American Men of Science by James McKeen Cattell in 1906. (Despite the name, two women, Grace Andrews and Charlotte Angas Scott, were listed in this first edition of American Men of Science.) As of 2020, the book has published 38 editions in its 114-year history. In 1971, its name was changed from American Men of Science to American Men and Women of Science.

The project editor for the 38th edition published in 2020 was Katherine H. Nemeh. Recent Advisory Board members include James E. Bobick, Former Department Head, Science and Technology Carnegie Library of Pittsburgh K. Lee Lerner, Science Correspondent and Senior Commissioning Editor, LMG (London, Paris, Cambridge); and David A. Tyckoson, Associate Dean, Henry Madden Library, California State University, Fresno. Lerner, also a member of the National Press Club of Washington, D.C.. has served on the AMWS Advisory Board since 2003.

Recent editions have made progress toward greater inclusion and diversity. The 18 volumes of the 38th edition of AMWS feature short biographies, including education, experience, research, honors and awards, across a range of scientific disciplines. Entries are indexed by the 192 Taxonomy of Degrees and Employment Specialties categories of the National Science Foundation.
