= Nitrocellulose =

Highly flammable compound

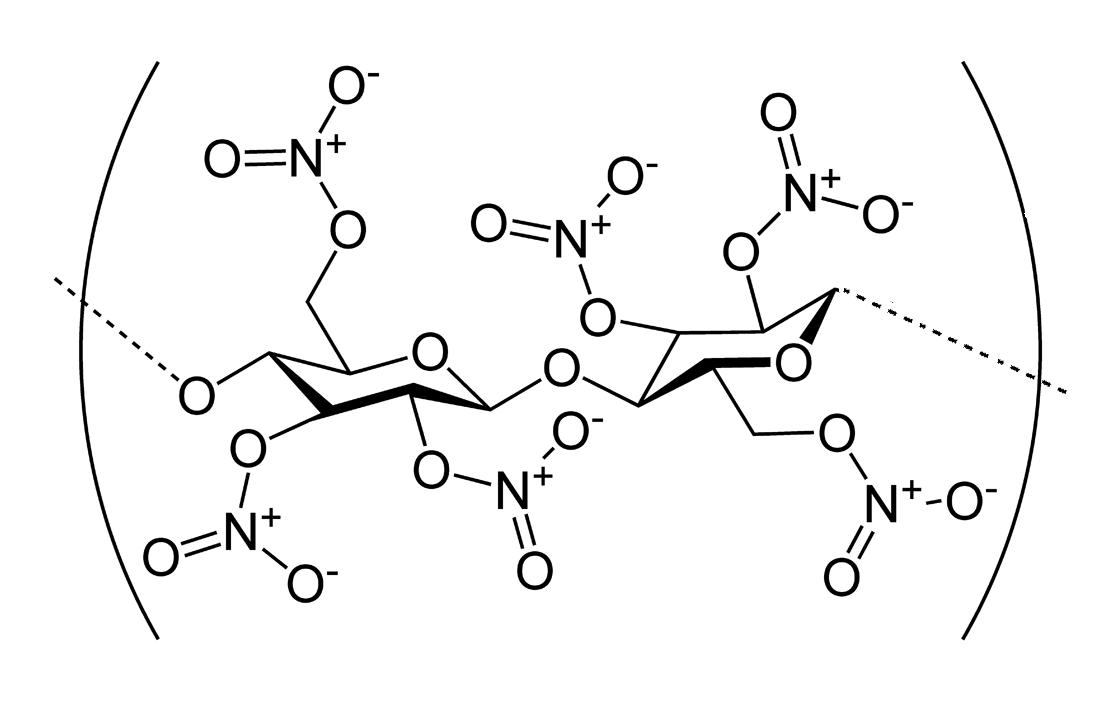

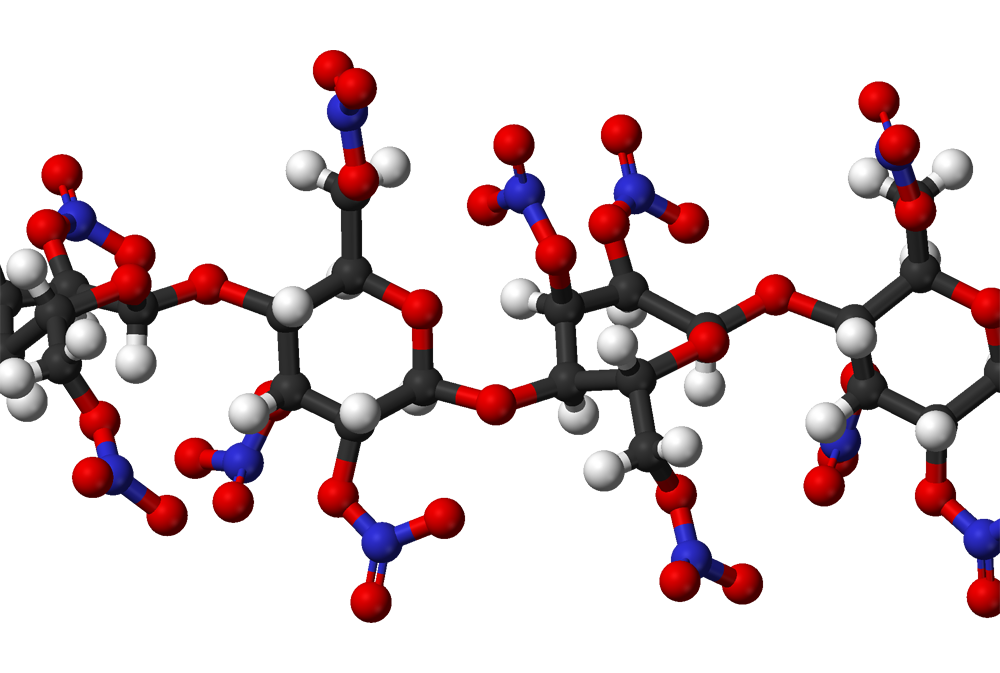

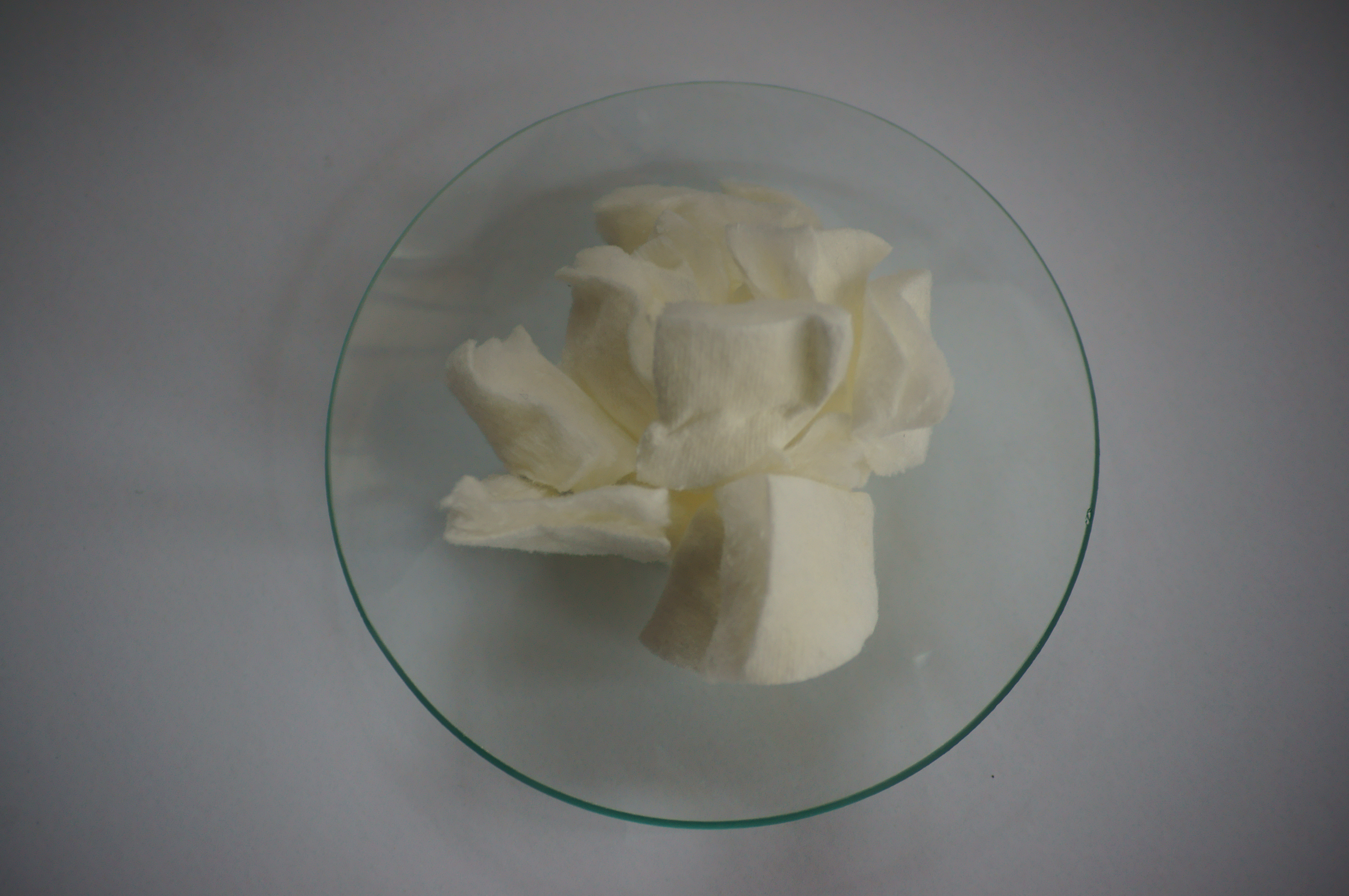

Names
- Other names Cellulose nitrate; Flash paper; Flash cotton; Flash string; Gun cotton; Collodion; Pyroxylin

Identifiers
CAS Number	9004-70-0
ChemSpider	none
UNII	KYR8BR2X6O

Properties
Chemical formula	(C_{6}H_{9}(NO_{2})O_{5})_{n} (mononitrocellulose) (C_{6}H_{8}(NO_{2})_{2}O_{5})_{n} (dinitrocellulose) (C_{6}H_{7}(NO_{2})_{3}O_{5})_{n} (trinitrocellulose, pictured in structures above)
Appearance	Yellowish white cotton-like filaments
Melting point	160 to 170 °C (320 to 338 °F; 433 to 443 K) (ignites)

Hazards
NFPA 704 (fire diamond)	2 3 3
Flash point	4.4 °C (39.9 °F; 277.5 K)
- Lethal dose or concentration (LD, LC)
LD_{50} (median dose)	10 mg/kg (mouse, IV)
- Except where otherwise noted, data are given for materials in their standard state (at 25 °C [77 °F], 100 kPa). verify (what is ?) Infobox references

Nitrocellulose (also known as cellulose nitrate, flash paper, flash cotton, guncotton, pyroxylin and flash string, depending on form) is a highly flammable compound formed by nitrating cellulose through exposure to a mixture of nitric acid and sulfuric acid.

One of its first major uses was as guncotton, a replacement for gunpowder as propellant in firearms. It was also used to replace gunpowder as a low-order explosive in mining and other applications. In the form of collodion, it was also a critical component in an early photographic emulsion, the use of which revolutionized photography in the 1860s. In the 20th century, it was adapted to automobile lacquer and adhesives.

== Production ==
The process uses a mixture of nitric acid and sulfuric acid to convert cellulose into nitrocellulose. The quality of the cellulose is important. Hemicellulose, lignin, pentosans, and mineral salts give inferior nitrocelluloses. In organic chemistry, nitrocellulose is a nitrate ester, not a nitro compound. The glucose repeat unit (anhydroglucose) within the cellulose chain has three –OH groups, each of which can form a nitrate ester. Thus, nitrocellulose can denote mononitrocellulose, dinitrocellulose, and trinitrocellulose, or a mixture thereof. With fewer –OH groups than the parent cellulose, nitrocelluloses do not aggregate by hydrogen bonding. The overarching consequence is that the nitrocellulose is soluble in organic solvents such as acetone and esters; e.g., ethyl acetate, methyl acetate, ethyl carbonate. Most lacquers are prepared from the dinitrate, whereas explosives are mainly the trinitrate.

The chemical equation for the formation of the trinitrate is
3 HNO_{3} + C_{6}H_{7}(OH)_{3}O_{2} C_{6}H_{7}(ONO_{_{2}})_{3}O_{2} + 3 H_{2}O.

The yields are about 85%, with losses attributed to complete oxidation of the cellulose to oxalic acid.

== Use ==
The principal use of cellulose nitrate is for the production of lacquers and coatings, explosives, and celluloid.

In terms of lacquers and coatings, nitrocellulose dissolves readily in organic solvents, which upon evaporation leave a colorless, transparent, flexible film. Nitrocellulose lacquers have been used as a finish on furniture and musical instruments.

Guncotton, dissolved at about 25% in acetone, forms a lacquer used in preliminary stages of wood finishing to develop a hard finish with a deep lustre. It is normally the first coat applied, then it is sanded and followed by other coatings that bond to it.

Nail polish contains nitrocellulose, as it is inexpensive, dries quickly to a hard film, and does not damage skin.

The explosive applications are diverse and nitrate content is typically higher for propellant applications than for coatings. For space flight, nitrocellulose was used by Copenhagen Suborbitals on several missions as a means of jettisoning components of the rocket/space capsule and deploying recovery systems. However, after several missions and flights, it proved not to have the desired explosive properties in a near vacuum environment. In 2014, the Philae comet lander failed to deploy its harpoons because its 0.3 grams of nitrocellulose propulsion charges failed to fire during the landing.

=== Other uses ===
Collodion, a solution of nitrocellulose, is used in topical skin applications such as liquid skin and in the application of salicylic acid, the active ingredient in Compound W wart remover.

==== Laboratory uses ====
- Membrane filters made of a mesh of nitrocellulose threads with various porosities are used in laboratory procedures for particle retention and cell capture in liquid or gaseous solutions and, reversely, obtaining particle-free filtrates.
- A nitrocellulose slide, nitrocellulose membrane, or nitrocellulose paper is a sticky membrane used for immobilizing nucleic acids in southern blots and northern blots. It is also used for immobilization of proteins in western blots and atomic force microscopy for its nonspecific affinity for amino acids. Nitrocellulose is widely used as support in diagnostic tests where antigen-antibody binding occurs; e.g., pregnancy tests, U-albumin tests, and CRP tests. Glycine and chloride ions make protein transfer more efficient.
- Radon tests for alpha track etches use nitrocellulose.
- Adolph Noé developed a method of peeling coal balls using nitrocellulose.
- It is used to coat playing cards and to bind staples together in office staplers.

==== Hobbies ====
- In 1846, nitrated cellulose was found to be soluble in ether and alcohol. The solution was named collodion and was soon used as a dressing for wounds.
- In 1851, Frederick Scott Archer invented the wet collodion process as a replacement for albumen in early photographic emulsions, binding light-sensitive silver halides to a glass plate.
- Magicians' flash paper are sheets of paper consisting of pure nitrocellulose, which burn almost instantly with a bright flash, leaving no ash or smoke.
- As a medium for cryptographic one-time pads, they make the disposal of the pad complete, secure, and efficient.
- Nitrocellulose lacquer is spin-coated onto aluminium or glass discs, then a groove is cut with a lathe, to make one-off phonograph records, used as masters for pressing or for play in dance clubs. They are referred to as acetate discs.
- Depending on the manufacturing process, nitrocellulose is esterified to varying degrees. Table tennis balls, guitar picks, and some photographic films have fairly low esterification levels and burn comparatively slowly with some charred residue.

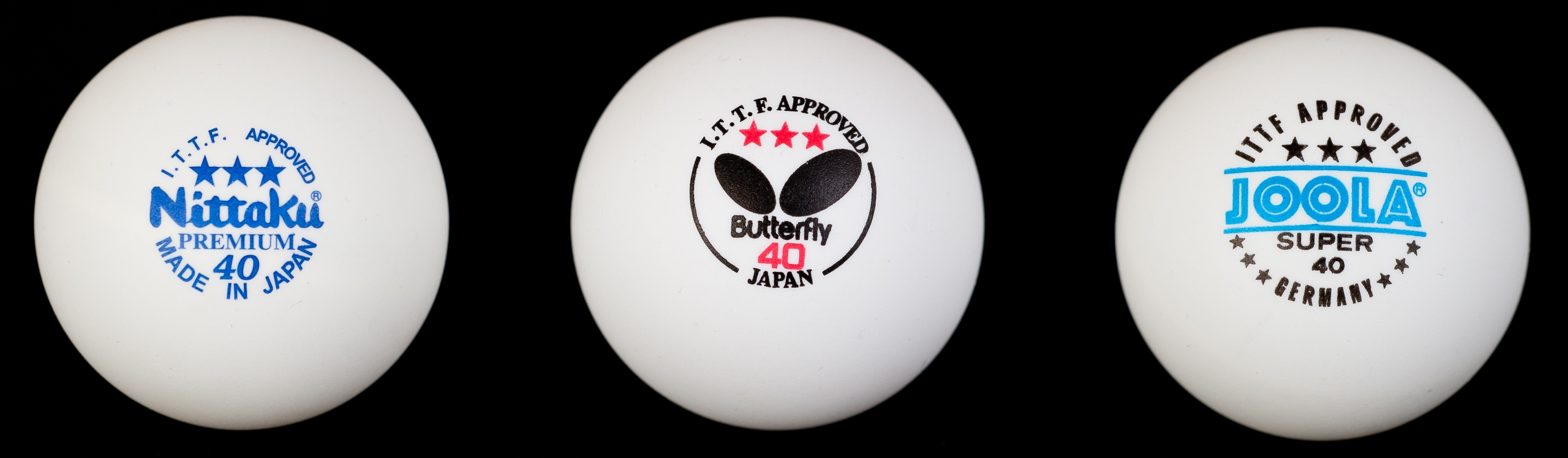
Table tennis ball, prepared from nitrocellulose (Celluloid)

== Historical uses ==
=== Early work on nitration of cellulose ===
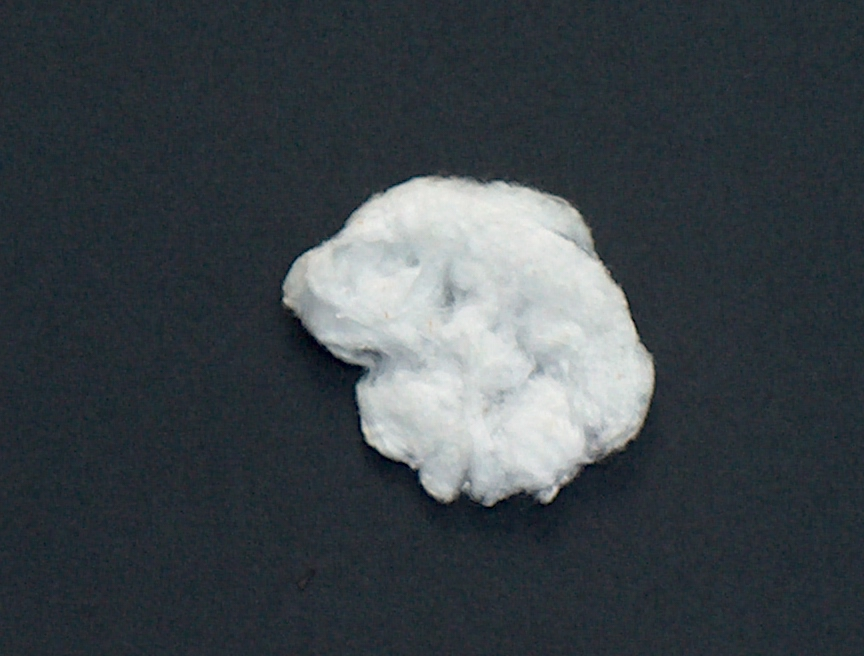
Pure nitrocellulose

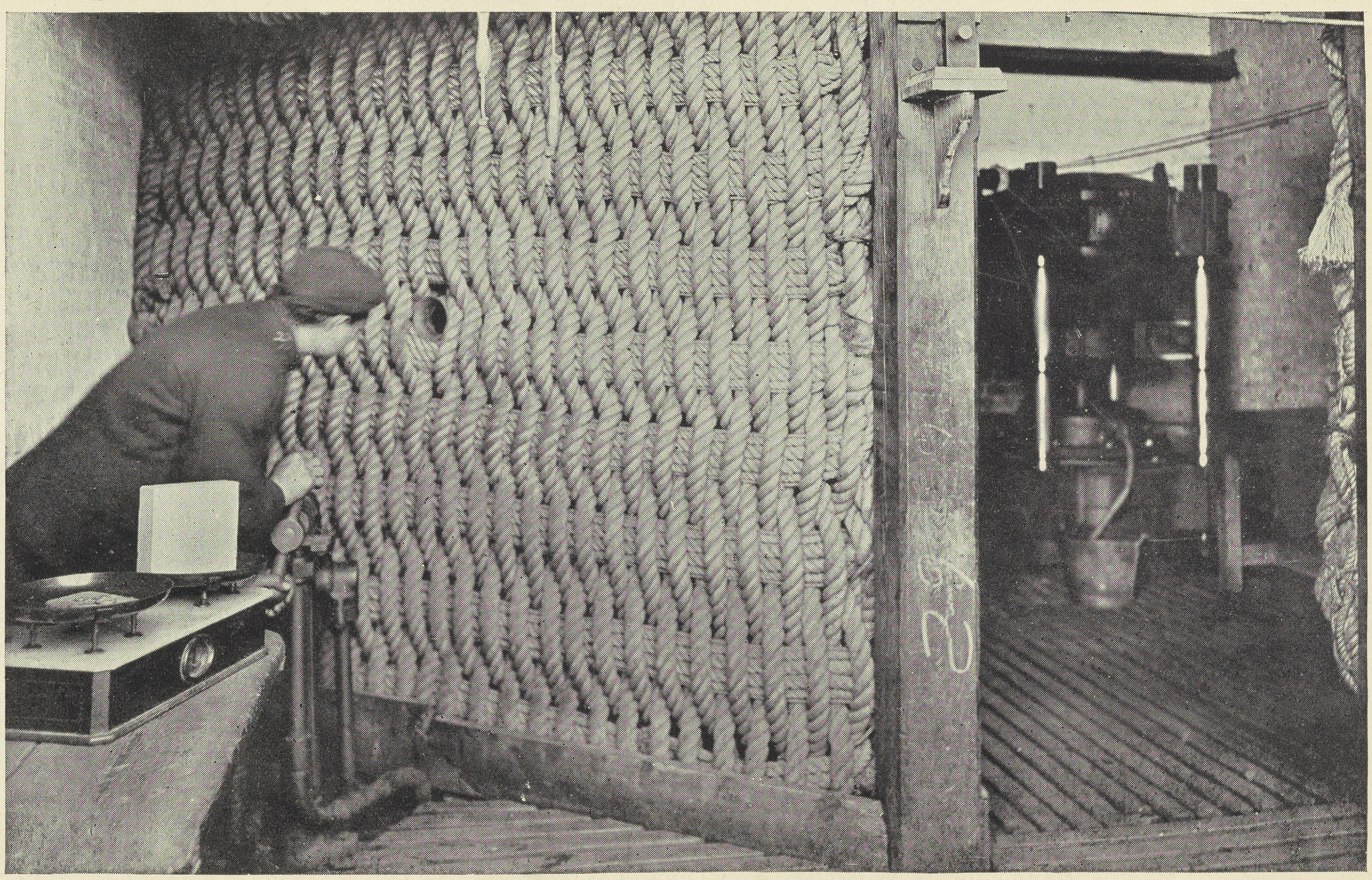
Workman operating a guncotton press behind a protective rope screen, 1909

Deflagration test of nitrocellulose in slow motion

In 1832 Henri Braconnot discovered that nitric acid, when combined with starch or wood fibers, would produce a lightweight combustible explosive material, which he named xyloïdine. A few years later in 1838, another French chemist, Théophile-Jules Pelouze (teacher of Ascanio Sobrero and Alfred Nobel), treated paper and cardboard in the same way. Jean-Baptiste Dumas obtained a similar material, which he called nitramidine.

==== Guncotton ====
Around 1846 Christian Friedrich Schönbein, a German-Swiss chemist, discovered a more practical formulation. As he was working in the kitchen of his home in Basel, he spilled a mixture of nitric acid (HNO_{3}) and sulfuric acid (H_{2}SO_{4}) on the kitchen table. He reached for the nearest cloth, a cotton apron, and wiped it up. He hung the apron on the stove door to dry, and as soon as it was dry, a flash occurred as the apron ignited. His preparation method was the first to be widely used.

The method was to immerse one part of fine cotton in 15 parts of an equal blend of sulfuric acid and nitric acid. After two minutes, the cotton was removed and washed in cold water to set the esterification level and to remove all acid residue. The cotton was then slowly dried at a temperature below 40 °C (104 °F). Schönbein collaborated with the Frankfurt professor Rudolf Christian Böttger, who had discovered the process independently in the same year.

By coincidence, a third chemist, the Brunswick professor F. J. Otto had also produced guncotton in 1846 and was the first to publish the process, much to the disappointment of Schönbein and Böttger.

The patent rights for the manufacture of guncotton were obtained by John Hall & Son in 1846, and industrial manufacture of the explosive began at a purpose-built factory at Marsh Works in Faversham, Kent, a year later. The manufacturing process was not properly understood and few safety measures were put in place. A serious explosion in July that killed almost two dozen workers resulted in the immediate closure of the plant. Guncotton manufacture ceased for over 15 years until a safer procedure could be developed.

The British chemist Frederick Augustus Abel developed the first safe process for guncotton manufacture, which he patented in 1865. The washing and drying times of the nitrocellulose were both extended to 48 hours and repeated eight times over. The acid mixture was changed to two parts sulfuric acid to one part nitric. Nitration can be controlled by adjusting acid concentrations and reaction temperature. Nitrocellulose is soluble in a mixture of ethanol and ether until nitrogen concentration exceeds 12%. Soluble nitrocellulose, or a solution thereof, is sometimes called collodion.

Guncotton containing more than 13% nitrogen (sometimes called insoluble nitrocellulose) was prepared by prolonged exposure to hot, concentrated acids for limited use as a blasting explosive or for warheads of underwater weapons such as naval mines and torpedoes. Safe and sustained production of guncotton began at the Waltham Abbey Royal Gunpowder Mills in the 1860s, and the material rapidly became the dominant explosive, becoming the standard for military warheads, although it remained too potent to be used as a propellant. More-stable and slower-burning collodion mixtures were eventually prepared using less concentrated acids at lower temperatures for smokeless powder in firearms. The first practical smokeless powder made from nitrocellulose, for firearms and artillery ammunition, was invented by French chemist Paul Vieille in 1884.

Jules Verne viewed the development of guncotton with optimism. He referred to the substance several times in his novels. His adventurers carried firearms employing this substance. In his From the Earth to the Moon, guncotton was used to launch a projectile into space.

Because of their fluffy and nearly white appearance, nitrocellulose products are often referred to as cottons, e.g. lacquer cotton, celluloid cotton, and gun cotton.

Guncotton was originally made from cotton (as the source of cellulose) but contemporary methods use highly processed cellulose from wood pulp. While guncotton is dangerous to store, the hazards it presents can be minimized by storing it dampened with various liquids, such as alcohol. For this reason, accounts of guncotton usage dating from the early 20th century refer to "wet guncotton."

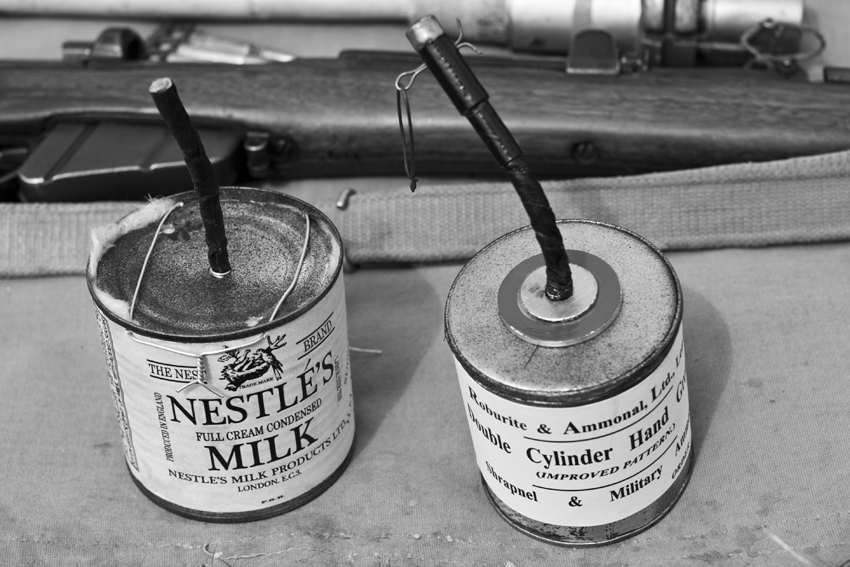
Jam tin grenades were made in World War I using gun cotton

The power of guncotton made it suitable for blasting. As a projectile driver, it had around six times the gas generation of an equal volume of black powder and produced less smoke and less heating.

Gun cotton was used in naval mines and demolition charges during the American Civil War. The limited Civil War use was because safe production methods were not developed until post-war. Also, gun cotton could decompose in storage - with disastrous results.

During the first World War, British authorities were slow to introduce new grenades, with soldiers at the front improvising by filling ration tin cans with gun cotton, scrap and a basic fuse.

Further research indicated the importance of washing the acidified cotton. Unwashed nitrocellulose (sometimes called pyrocellulose) may spontaneously ignite and explode at room temperature, as the evaporation of water results in the concentration of unreacted acid.

=== Film ===
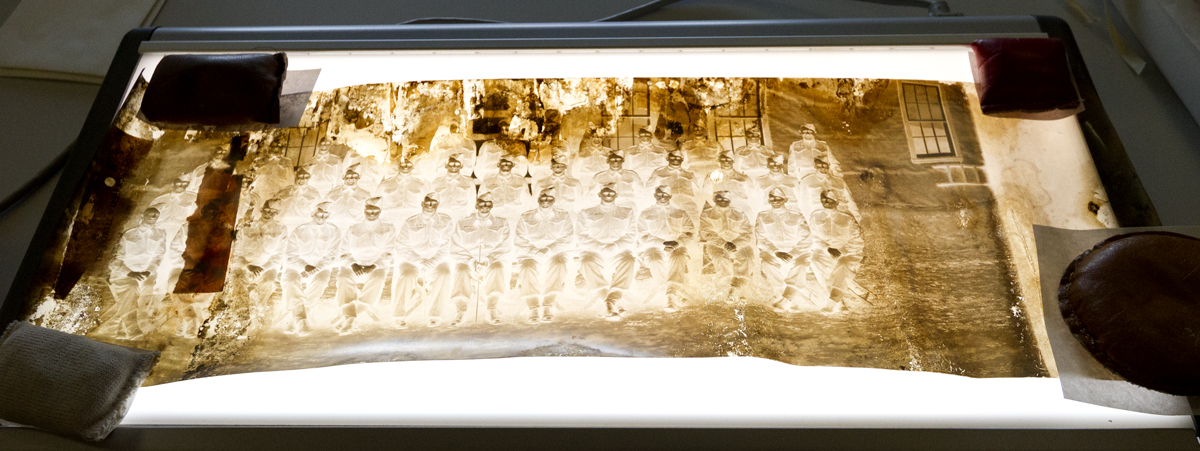
Nitrocellulose film on a light box, showing deterioration, from Library and Archives Canada collection

In 1855, the first human-made plastic, nitrocellulose (branded Parkesine, patented in 1862), was created by Alexander Parkes from cellulose treated with nitric acid and a solvent. In 1868, American inventor John Wesley Hyatt developed a plastic material he named Celluloid, improving on Parkes' invention by plasticizing the nitrocellulose with camphor so that it could be processed into a photographic film. This was used commercially as "celluloid", a highly flammable plastic that until the mid-20th century formed the basis for lacquers and photographic film.

On May 2, 1887, Hannibal Goodwin filed a patent for "a photographic pellicle and process of producing same ... especially in connection with roller cameras", but the patent was not granted until September 13, 1898. In the meantime, George Eastman had already started production of roll-film using his own process.

Nitrocellulose was used as the first flexible film base, beginning with Eastman Kodak products in August 1889. Camphor is used as a plasticizer for nitrocellulose film, often called nitrate film. Goodwin's patent was sold to Ansco, which successfully sued Eastman Kodak for infringement of the patent and was awarded $5,000,000 in 1914 to Goodwin Film.

==== Nitrate film fires ====
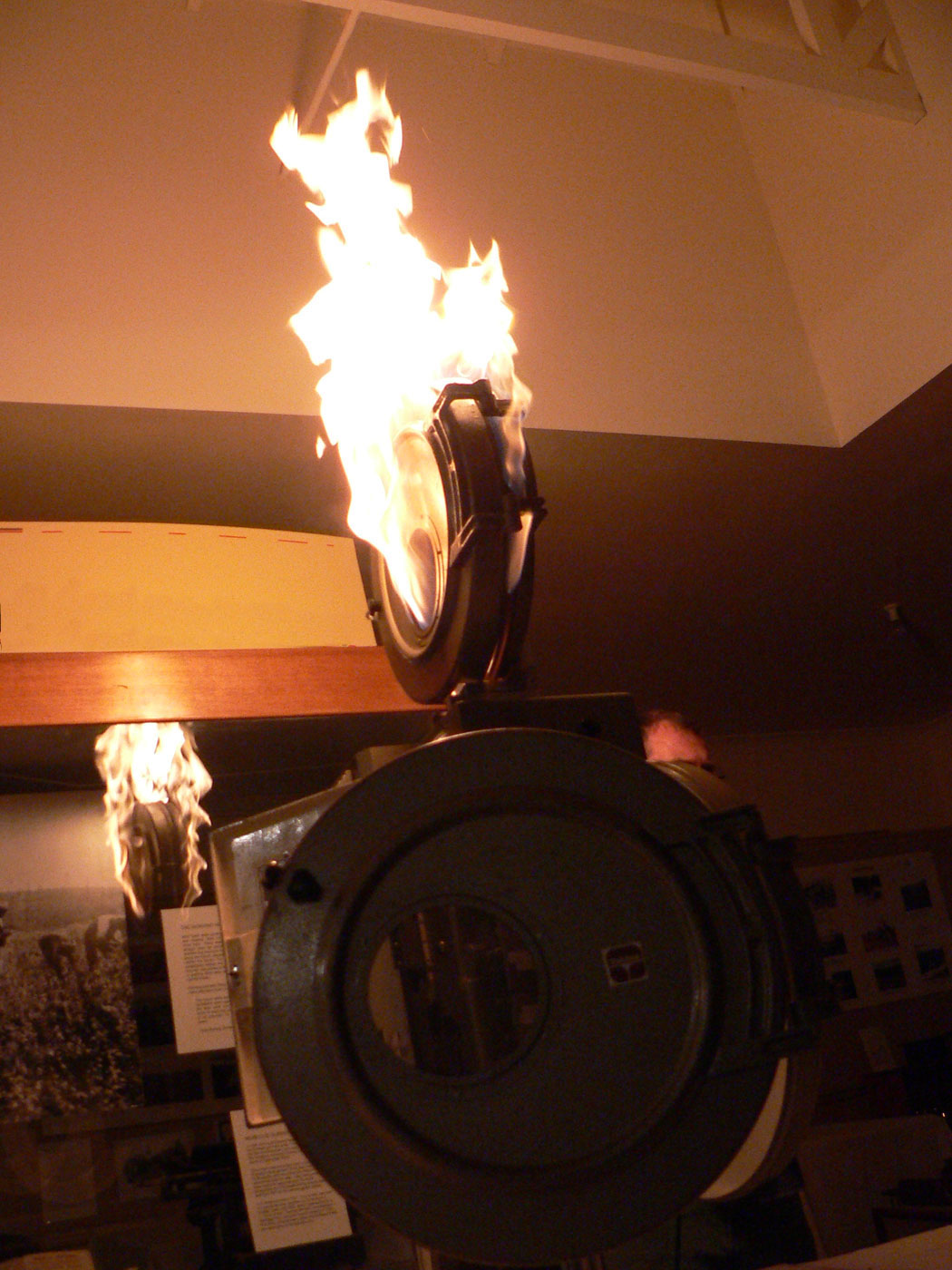
A reel of nitrate film that has caught fire inside a projector after breaking inside the mechanism and igniting from the heat of the lamp

Disastrous fires related to celluloid or "nitrate film" became regular occurrences in the motion picture industry throughout the silent era and for many years after the arrival of sound film. Projector fires and spontaneous combustion of nitrate footage stored in studio vaults and in other structures were often blamed during the early to mid 20th century for destroying or heavily damaging cinemas, inflicting many serious injuries and deaths, and for reducing to ashes the master negatives and original prints of tens of thousands of screen titles, turning many of them into lost films. Even when nitrate stock did not start the blaze, flames from other sources spread to large nearby film collections, producing intense and highly destructive fires.

In 1914—the same year that Goodwin Film was awarded $5,000,000 from Kodak for patent infringement—nitrate film fires incinerated a significant portion of the United States' early cinematic history. In that year alone, five very destructive fires occurred at four major studios and a film-processing plant. Millions of feet of film burned on March 19 at the Eclair Moving Picture Company in Fort Lee, New Jersey. Later that same month, many more reels and film cans of negatives and prints also burned at Edison Studios in New York City, in the Bronx. On May 13, a fire at Universal Pictures' Colonial Hall "film factory" in Manhattan consumed another extensive collection. Yet again, on June 13 in Philadelphia, a fire and a series of explosions ignited inside the 186-square-meter (2,000-square-foot) film vault of the Lubin Manufacturing Company and quickly wiped out virtually all of that studio's pre-1914 catalogue. Then a second fire hit the Edison Company at another location on December 9, at its film-processing complex in West Orange, New Jersey. That catastrophic fire started inside a film-inspection building and caused over $7,000,000 in property damages ($225,000,000 today). Even after film technology changed, archives of older films remained vulnerable; the 1965 MGM vault fire burned many films that were decades old.

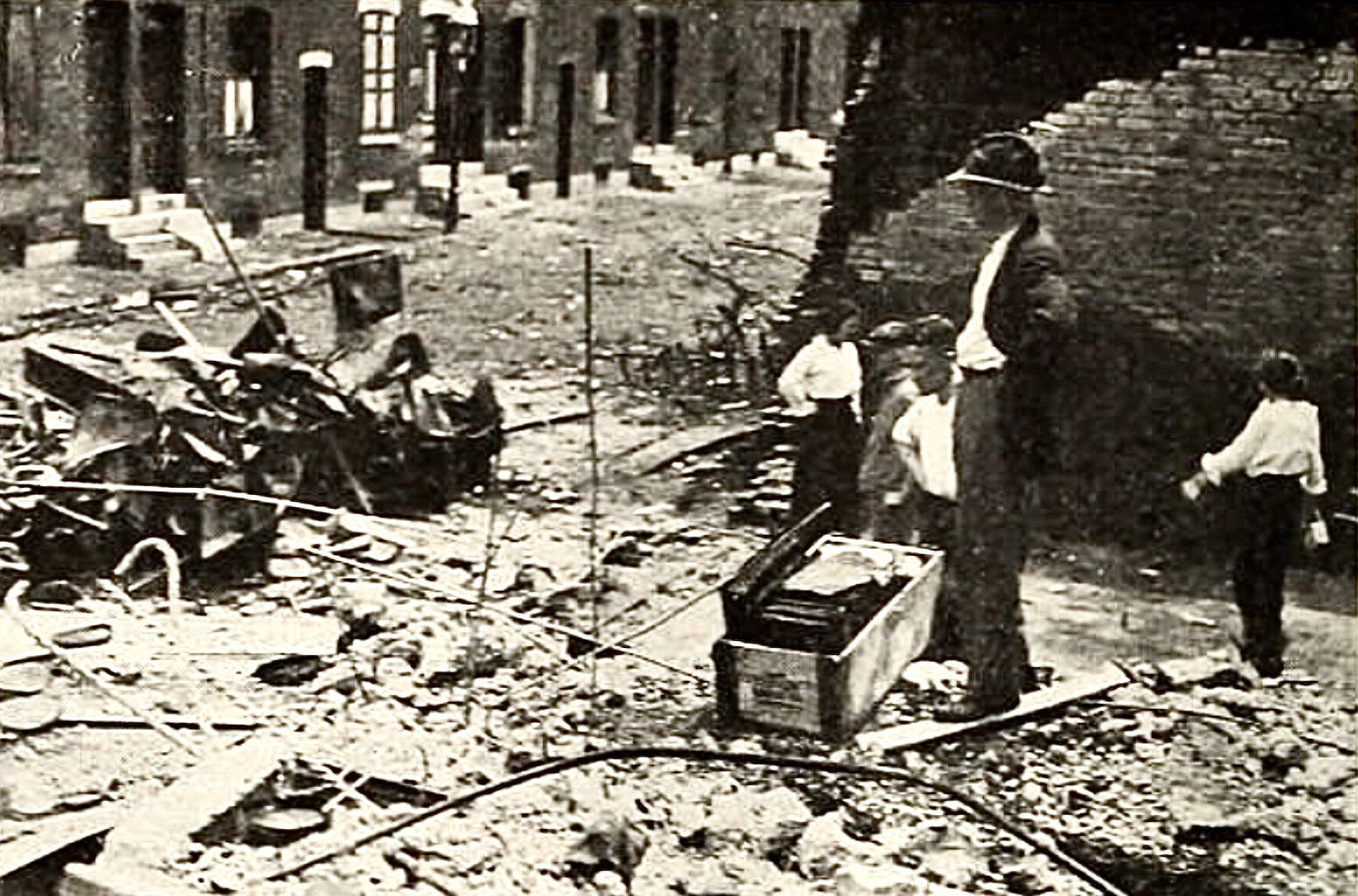
Lubin film vault custodian Stanley Lowry (foreground) surveys the rubble after fire and explosions, June 1914

The use of volatile nitrocellulose film for motion pictures led many cinemas to fireproof their projection rooms with wall coverings made of asbestos. Those additions intended to prevent or at least delay the migration of flames beyond the projection areas. A training film for projectionists included footage of a controlled ignition of a reel of nitrate film, which continued to burn even when fully submerged in water. Once burning, it is extremely difficult to extinguish. Unlike most other flammable materials, nitrocellulose does not need a source of air to continue burning, since it contains sufficient oxygen within its molecular structure to sustain a flame. For this reason, immersing burning film in water may not extinguish it, and could actually increase the amount of smoke produced. Owing to public safety precautions, the United Kingdom's Health and Safety Executive to this day forbids transportation of nitrate film by post or public transit, or disposal with household refuse.

Cinema fires caused by the ignition of nitrocellulose film stock commonly occurred as well. In Ireland in 1926, it was blamed for the Dromcolliher cinema tragedy in County Limerick in which 48 people died. Then in 1929 at the Glen Cinema in Paisley, Scotland, a film-related fire killed 69 children. Today, nitrate film projection is rare and normally highly regulated and requires extensive precautions, including extra health-and-safety training for projectionists. A special projector certified to run nitrate films has many modifications, among them the chambering of the feed and takeup reels in thick metal covers with small slits to allow the film to run through them. The projector is additionally modified to accommodate several fire extinguishers with nozzles aimed at the film gate. The extinguishers automatically trigger if a piece of film near the gate starts to burn. While this triggering would likely damage or destroy a significant portion of the projector's components, it would contain a fire and prevent far greater damage. Projection rooms may also be required to have automatic metal covers for the projection windows, preventing the spread of fire to the auditorium. Today, the Dryden Theatre at the George Eastman Museum is one of a few theaters in the world that is capable of safely projecting nitrate films and regularly screens them to the public. The BFI Southbank in London is the only cinema in the United Kingdom licensed to show Nitrate Film.

The use of nitrate film and its fiery potential were certainly not issues limited to the realm of motion pictures or to commercial still photography. The film was also used for many years in medicine, where its hazardous nature was most acute, especially in its application to X-ray photography. In 1929, several tons of stored X-ray film were ignited by steam from a broken heating pipe at the Cleveland Clinic in Ohio. That tragedy claimed 123 lives during the fire and additional fatalities several days later, when hospitalized victims died due to inhaling excessive amounts of smoke from the burning film, which was laced with toxic gases such as sulfur dioxide and hydrogen cyanide. Related fires in other medical facilities prompted the growing disuse of nitrocellulose stock for X-rays by 1933, nearly two decades before its use was discontinued for motion-picture films in favour of cellulose acetate film, more commonly known as "safety film".

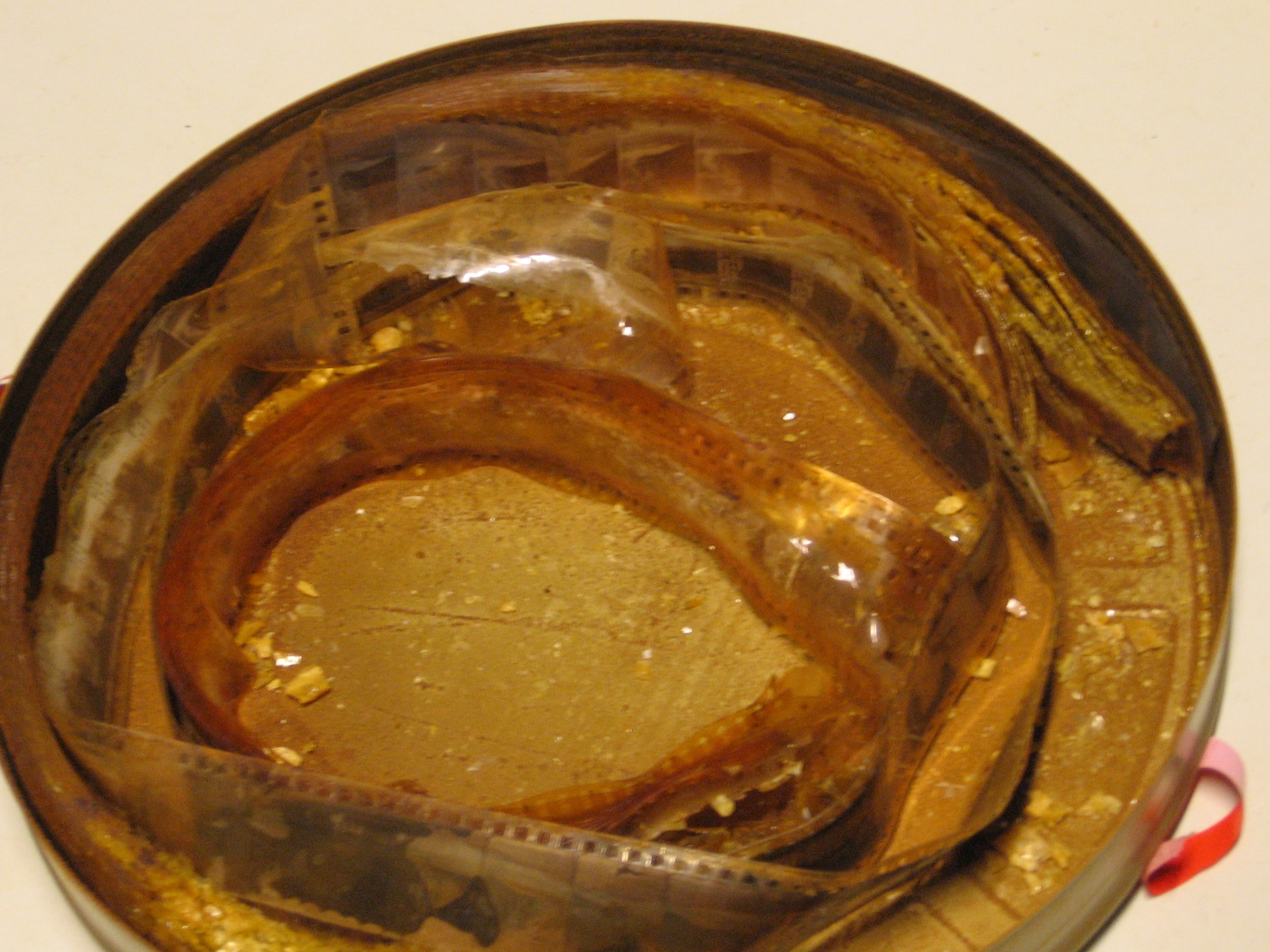
Decayed nitrate film, EYE Film Institute Netherlands

==== Safety stocks ====
Nitrocellulose was found to gradually decompose, releasing nitric acid and further catalyzing the decomposition (eventually into a flammable powder). Decades later, storage at low temperatures was discovered as a means of delaying these reactions indefinitely. Many films produced during the early 20th century were lost through this accelerating, self-catalyzed disintegration or through studio warehouse fires, and many others were deliberately destroyed specifically to avoid the fire risk. Salvaging old films is a major problem for film archivists (see film preservation).

Nitrocellulose film base manufactured by Kodak can be identified by the presence of the word "nitrate" in dark letters along one edge; the word only in clear letters on a dark background indicates derivation from a nitrate base original negative or projection print, but the film in hand itself may be a later print or copy negative, made on safety film. Acetate film manufactured during the era when nitrate films were still in use was marked "Safety" or "Safety Film" along one edge in dark letters. 8, 9.5, and 16 mm film stocks, intended for amateur and other nontheatrical use, were never manufactured with a nitrate base in the west, but rumors exist of 16 mm nitrate film having been produced in the former Soviet Union and China.

Nitrate dominated the market for professional-use 35 mm motion picture film from the industry's origins to the early 1950s. While cellulose acetate-based safety film, notably cellulose diacetate and cellulose acetate propionate, was produced in the gauge for small-scale use in niche applications (such as printing advertisements and other short films to enable them to be sent through the mails without the need for fire safety precautions), the early generations of safety film base had two major disadvantages relative to nitrate: it was much more expensive to manufacture, and considerably less durable in repeated projection. The cost of the safety precautions associated with the use of nitrate was significantly lower than the cost of using any of the safety bases available before 1948. These drawbacks were eventually overcome with the launch of cellulose triacetate base film by Eastman Kodak in 1948. Cellulose triacetate superseded nitrate as the film industry's mainstay base very quickly. While Kodak had discontinued some nitrate film stocks earlier, it stopped producing various nitrate roll films in 1950 and ceased production of nitrate 35 mm motion picture film in 1951.

The crucial advantage cellulose triacetate had over nitrate was that it was no more of a fire risk than paper (the stock is often referred to as "non-flam": this is true—but it is combustible, just not in as volatile or as dangerous a way as nitrate), while it almost matched the cost and durability of nitrate. It remained in almost exclusive use in all film gauges until the 1980s, when polyester/PET film began to supersede it for intermediate and release printing.

Polyester is much more resistant to polymer degradation than either nitrate or triacetate. Although triacetate does not decompose in as dangerous a way as nitrate does, it is still subject to a process known as deacetylation, often nicknamed "vinegar syndrome" (due to the acetic acid smell of decomposing film) by archivists, which causes the film to shrink, deform, become brittle and eventually unusable. PET, like cellulose mononitrate, is less prone to stretching than other available plastics. By the late 1990s, polyester had almost entirely superseded triacetate for the production of intermediate elements and release prints.

Triacetate remains in use for most camera negative stocks because it can be "invisibly" spliced using solvents during negative assembly, while polyester film is usually spliced using adhesive tape patches, which leave visible marks in the frame area. However, ultrasonic splicing in the frame line area can be invisible. Also, polyester film is so strong, it will not break under tension and may cause serious damage to expensive camera or projector mechanisms in the event of a film jam, whereas triacetate film breaks easily, reducing the risk of damage. Many were opposed to the use of polyester for release prints for this reason, and because ultrasonic splicers are very expensive, beyond the budgets of many smaller theaters. In practice, though, this has not proved to be as much of a problem as was feared. Rather, with the increased use of automated long-play systems in cinemas, the greater strength of polyester has been a significant advantage in lessening the risk of a film performance being interrupted by a film break.

Despite its self-oxidizing hazards, nitrate is still regarded highly as the stock is more transparent than replacement stocks, and older films used denser silver in the emulsion. The combination results in a notably more luminous image with a high contrast ratio.

=== Fabric ===
The solubility of nitrocellulose was the basis for the first "artificial silk" by Georges Audemars in 1855, which he called "Rayon".. However, Hilaire de Chardonnet was the first to patent a nitrocellulose fiber marketed as "artificial silk" at the Paris Exhibition of 1889. Commercial production started in 1891, but the result was flammable and more expensive than cellulose acetate or cuprammonium rayon. Because of this predicament, production ceased early in the 1900s. Nitrocellulose was briefly known as "mother-in-law silk".

Frank Hastings Griffin invented the double-godet, a special stretch-spinning process that changed artificial silk to rayon, rendering it usable in many industrial products such as tire cords and clothing. Nathan Rosenstein invented the "spunize process" by which he turned rayon from a hard fiber to a fabric. This allowed rayon to become a popular raw material in textiles.

=== Coatings ===
Nitrocellulose lacquer manufactured by (among others) DuPont, was the primary material for painting automobiles for many years. However the durability of finish, complexities of "multiple stage" modern finishes, and other factors including environmental regulation led manufacturers to choose newer finishing materials and technologies from the late 1950s onward. Regardless, nitrocellulose continues to be a favorite finish of automobile hobbyists for both historical reasons and for the ease with which a professional finish can be obtained. Most automobile "touch up" paints are still made from lacquer because of its fast drying, easy application, and superior adhesion properties that are compatible with many other types of finish. The guitar manufacturing industry also used nitrocellulose finishes for decades, with a number of guitar finishes sharing color codes with automobiles in the 1950s and 60s. However like automobiles, nitrocellulose fell out of favor for many of the same reasons, and shifted towards modern polyurethane finishes from the late 1960s. Nonetheless, Gibson still uses nitrocellulose lacquers on all of their guitars, and many large manufacturer custom shops such as Fender, as well as smaller manufacturing shops offer nitrocellulose finishes as a premium option to reproduce the "vintage" aesthetic.

== Hazards ==
'United States Inter-Agency Committee for Nitrate Film Vault Tests' – film transfer from 1948 about testing storage and flame suppression methods of nitrate film stock; runtime 00:08:41

Because of its explosive nature, not all applications of nitrocellulose were successful. In 1869, with elephants having been poached to near extinction, the billiards industry offered a US$10,000 prize to whoever came up with the best replacement for ivory billiard balls. John Wesley Hyatt created the winning replacement, which he created with a new material he invented, called camphored nitrocellulose—the first thermoplastic, better known as celluloid. The invention enjoyed a brief popularity, but the Hyatt balls were extremely flammable, and sometimes portions of the outer shell would explode upon impact. An owner of a billiard saloon in Colorado wrote to Hyatt about the explosive tendencies, saying that he did not mind very much personally but for the fact that every man in his saloon immediately pulled a gun at the sound. The process used by Hyatt to manufacture the billiard balls, patented in 1881, involved placing the mass of nitrocellulose in a rubber bag, which was then placed in a cylinder of liquid and heated. Pressure was applied to the liquid in the cylinder, which resulted in a uniform compression on the nitrocellulose mass, compressing it into a uniform sphere as the heat vaporized the solvents. The ball was then cooled and turned to make a uniform sphere. In light of the explosive results, this process was called the "Hyatt gun method".

An overheated container of dry nitrocellulose is believed to be the initial cause of the 2015 Tianjin explosions.

== See also ==
- Pentaerythritol tetranitrate (PETN), a related explosive.
- Cordite
- Nitroglycerine
- Nitrostarch
- RE factor
