= Grace Andrews =

Grace Andrews may refer to:

- Grace Andrews (mathematician) (1869–1951), American mathematician
- Grace Andrews, a schooner wrecked on Dog Island, Florida
- Grace Andrews (TOWIE), in The Only Way is Essex
- Grace Andrews, a character in the film The Hitcher and the remake
