= Edward Gayer Andrews =

American Bishop (1825–1907)

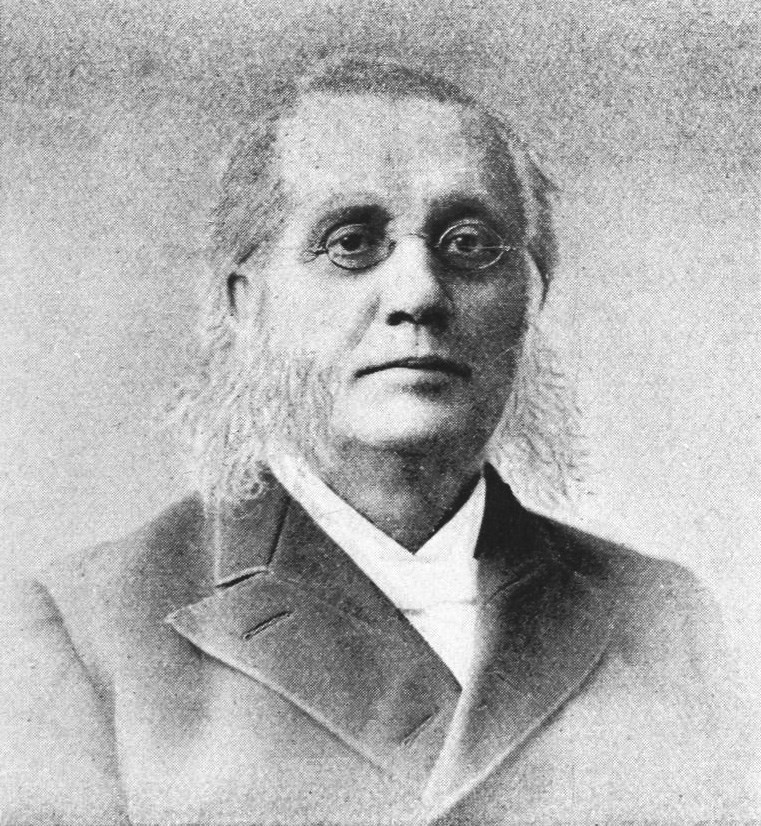
- Born: August 7, 1825; New Hartford, New York, U.S.
- Died: December 31, 1907 (aged 82); New York City, U.S.
- Burial place: Oakwood Cemetery
- Education: Cazenovia College; Wesleyan University
- Occupation: Bishop
- Family: Grace Andrews (daughter)

Edward Gayer Andrews (7 August 1825 – 31 December 1907) was a bishop of the Methodist Episcopal Church, elected in 1872.

== Biography ==
He was born in New Hartford, New York (Oneida County). He was educated at Cazenovia Seminary in Cazenovia, New York, and at Wesleyan University (B.A., 1847) (M.A. 1854), where he became a member of the Mystical Seven. He was ordained in the Central New York Annual Conference of the M.E. Church, serving various pastorates there from 1848 until 1854. He was then appointed teacher and Principal (i.e., President) of the Cazenovia Seminary, where he remained until 1864. He then became Pastor in Stamford, Connecticut (1864–67), and in Brooklyn, New York (1867–72) until his election to the episcopacy.

== Travels ==
As bishop he visited M.E. Missions in Europe and India (1876–77), in Mexico (1881) and in Japan, Korea and China (1889–90). He also was a delegate to the British and Irish Methodist Conference in 1894. Wesleyan conferred upon him the degree LL.D. in 1900. He retired from the active episcopacy in 1904.

His theology was described as holding to the faith of his denomination for essentials of doctrine, but with deference to the results of Biblical scholarship. He has published semi-centennial addresses delivered in 1875 and 1881.

Bishop Andrews died 31 December 1907 in Brooklyn.

== See also ==
- List of bishops of the United Methodist Church
- Grace Andrews, the daughter of Edward Gayer Andrews
