= Coal ball =

Stone of peat that did not turn into coal

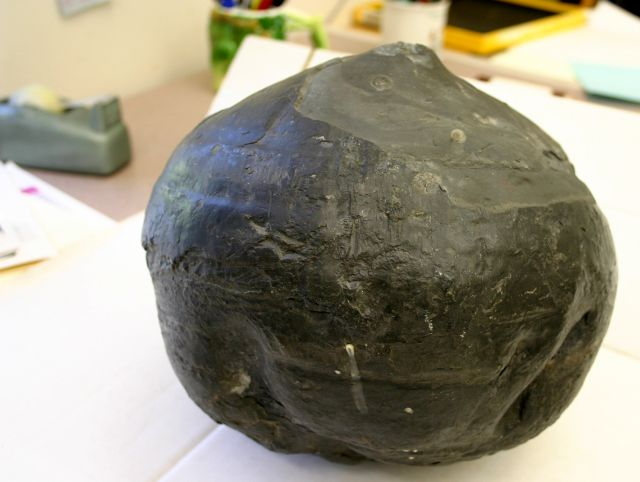
- A coal ball

Composition
- Permineralised plant remains

A coal ball is a type of concretion, varying in shape from an imperfect sphere to a flat-lying, irregular slab. Coal balls were formed in Carboniferous Period swamps and mires, when peat was prevented from being turned into coal by the high amount of calcite surrounding the peat; the calcite caused it to be turned into stone instead. As such, despite not actually being made of coal, the coal ball owes its name to its similar origins as well as its similar shape with actual coal.

Coal balls often preserve a remarkable record of the microscopic tissue structure of Carboniferous swamp and mire plants, which would otherwise have been completely destroyed. Their unique preservation of Carboniferous plants makes them valuable to scientists, who cut and peel the coal balls to research the geological past.

In 1855, two English scientists, Joseph Dalton Hooker and Edward William Binney, made the first scientific description of coal balls in England, and the initial research on coal balls was carried out in Europe. North American coal balls were discovered and identified in 1922. Coal balls have since been found in other countries, leading to the discovery of hundreds of species and genera.

Coal balls may be found in coal seams across North America and Eurasia. North American coal balls are more widespread, both stratigraphically and geologically, than those in Europe. The oldest known coal balls date from the Namurian stage of the Carboniferous; they were found in Germany and on the territory of former Czechoslovakia.

== Introduction to the scientific world, and formation ==
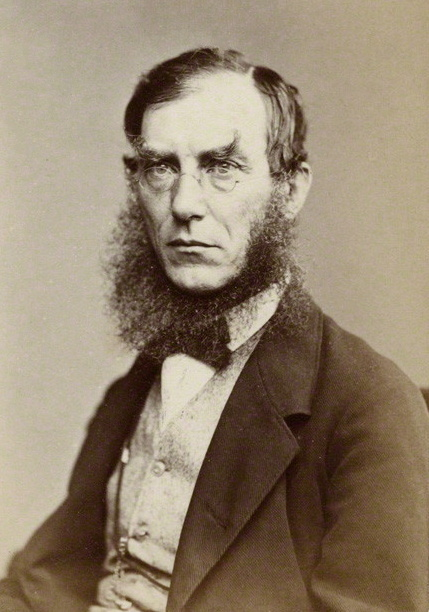
Sir Joseph Dalton Hooker, who along with Edward William Binney was the first to report on coal balls

The first scientific description of coal balls was made in 1855 by Sir Joseph Dalton Hooker and Edward William Binney, who reported on examples in the coal seams of Yorkshire and Lancashire, England. European scientists did much of the early research.

Coal balls in North America were first found in Iowa coal seams in 1894, although the connection to European coal balls was not made until Adolf Carl Noé (whose coal ball was found by Gilbert Cady) drew the parallel in 1922. Noé's work renewed interest in coal balls, and by the 1930s had drawn paleobotanists from Europe to the Illinois Basin in search of them.

There are two theories – the autochthonous (in situ) theory and the allochthonous (drift) theory – that attempt to explain the formation of coal balls, although the subject is mostly speculation.

Supporters of the in situ theory believe that close to its present location organic matter accumulated near a peat bog and, shortly after burial, underwent permineralisation – minerals seeped into the organic matter and formed an internal cast. Water with a high dissolved mineral content was buried with the plant matter in a peat bog. As the dissolved ions crystallised, the mineral matter precipitated out. This caused concretions containing plant material to form and preserve as rounded lumps of stone. Coalification was thus prevented, and the peat was preserved and eventually became a coal ball. The majority of coal balls are found in bituminous and anthracite coal seams, in locations where the peat was not compressed sufficiently to render the material into coal.

Marie Stopes and David Watson analysed coal ball samples and decided that coal balls formed in situ. They stressed the importance of interaction with seawater, believing that it was necessary for the formation of coal balls. Some supporters of the in situ theory believe that Stopes' and Watson's discovery of a plant stem extending through multiple coal balls shows that coal balls formed in situ, stating that the drift theory fails to explain Stopes' and Watson's observation. They also cite fragile pieces of organic material projecting outside some coal balls, contending that if the drift theory was correct, the projections would have been destroyed, and some large coal balls are large enough that they could never have been transported in the first place.

The drift theory holds that the organic material did not form in or near its present location. Rather, it asserts that the material that would become a coal ball was transported from another location by means of a flood or a storm. Some supporters of the drift theory, such as Sergius Mamay and Ellis Yochelson, believed that the presence of marine animals in coal balls proved material was transported from a marine to a non-marine environment. Edward C. Jeffrey, stating that the in situ theory had "no good evidence", believed that the formation of coal balls from transported material was likely because coal balls often included material formed by transport and sedimentation in open water.

=== Contents ===
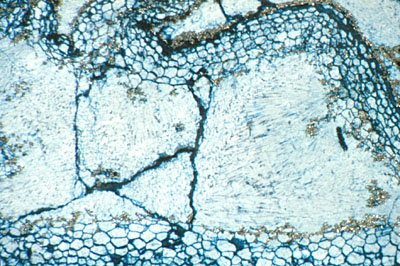
Calcite (middle) and dolomite (top and bottom) are common materials found in coal balls.

Coal balls are not made of coal; they are non-flammable and useless for fuel. Coal balls are calcium-rich permineralised life forms, mostly containing calcium and magnesium carbonates, pyrite, and quartz. Other minerals, including gypsum, illite, kaolinite, and lepidocrocite also appear in coal balls, albeit in lesser quantities. Although coal balls are usually about the size of a man's fist, their sizes vary greatly, ranging from that of a walnut up to 3 feet (1 m) in diameter. Coal balls have been found that were smaller than a thimble.

Coal balls commonly contain dolomites, aragonite, and masses of organic matter at various stages of decomposition. Hooker and Binney analysed a coal ball and found "a lack of coniferous wood ... and fronds of ferns" and noted that the discovered plant matter "appear[ed] to [have been arranged] just as they fell from the plants that produced them". Coal balls usually do not preserve the leaves of plants.

In 1962, Sergius Mamay and Ellis Yochelson analysed North American coal balls. Their discovery of marine organisms led to classification of coal balls were sorted into three types: normal (sometimes known as floral), containing only plant matter; faunal, containing animal fossils only; and mixed, containing both plant and animal material. Mixed coal balls are further divided into heterogeneous, where the plant and animal material was distinctly separated; and homogeneous, lacking that separation.

== Preservation ==
The quality of preservation in coal balls varies from no preservation to the point of being able to analyse the cellular structures. Some coal balls contain preserved root hairs, pollen, and spores, and are described as being "more or less perfectly preserved", containing "not what used to be the plant", but rather, the plant itself. Others have been found to be "botanically worthless", with the organic matter having deteriorated before becoming a coal ball. Coal balls with well-preserved contents are useful to paleobotanists. They have been used to analyse the geographical distribution of vegetation: for example, providing evidence that Ukrainian and Oklahoman plants of the tropical belt were once the same. Research on coal balls has also led to the discovery of more than 130 genera and 350 species.

Three main factors determine the quality of preserved material in a coal ball: the mineral constituents, the speed of the burial process, and the degree of compression before undergoing permineralisation. Generally, coal balls resulting from remains that have a quick burial with little decay and pressure are better preserved, although plant remains in most coal balls almost always show differing signs of decay and collapse. Coal balls containing quantities of iron sulfide have far lower preservation than coal balls permineralised by magnesium or calcium carbonate, which has earned iron sulfide the title "chief curse of the coal ball hunter".

== Distribution ==
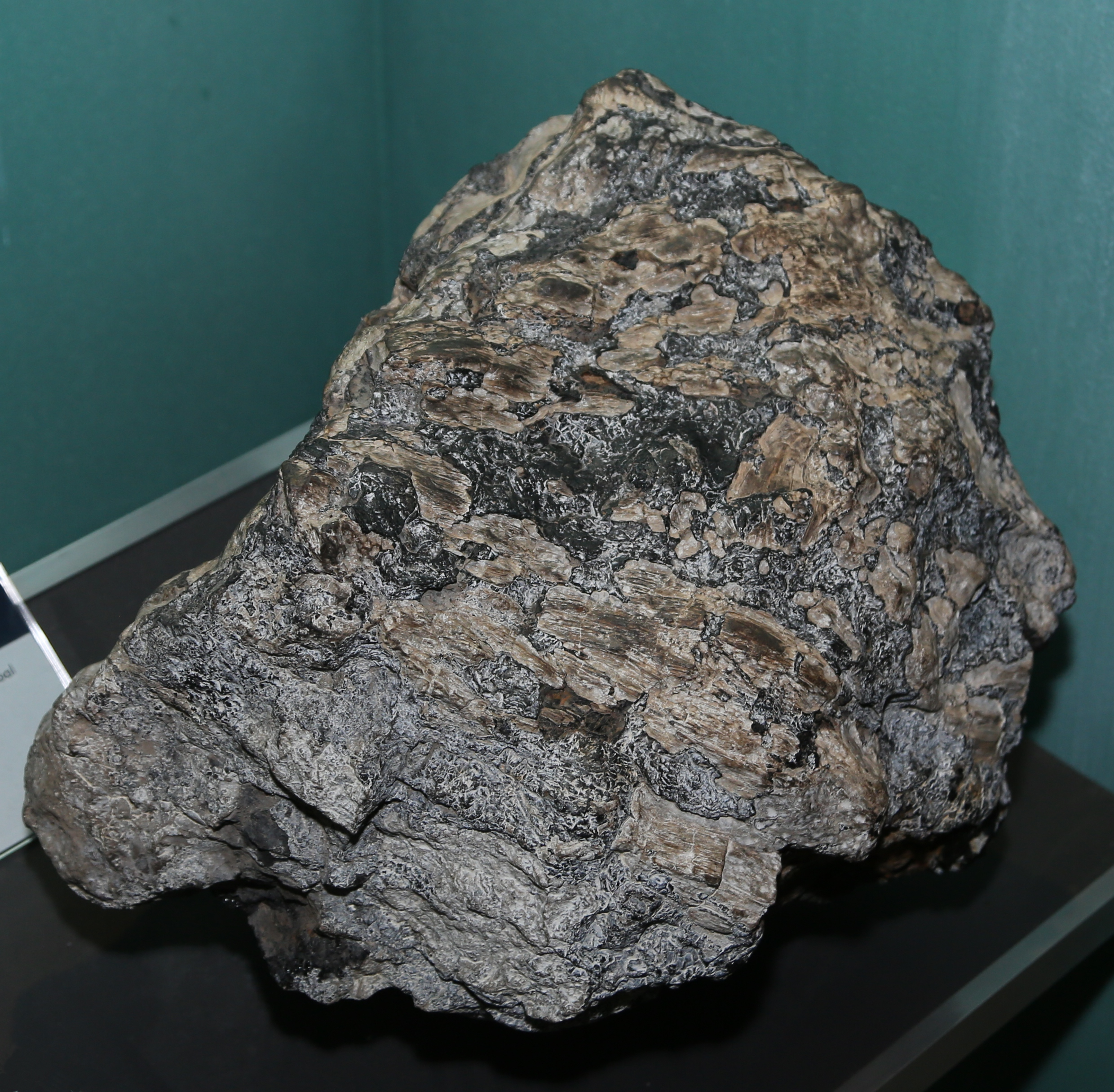
A coal ball from southern Illinois

Coal balls were first found in England, and later in other parts of the world, including Australia, Belgium, the Netherlands, the former Czechoslovakia, Germany, Ukraine, China, and Spain. They were also encountered in North America, where they are geographically widespread compared to Europe; in the United States, coal balls have been found from Kansas to the Illinois Basin to the Appalachian region.

The oldest coal balls were from the early end of the Namurian stage (326 to 313 mya) and discovered in Germany and former Czechoslovakia, but their ages generally range from the Permian (299 to 251 mya) to the Upper Carboniferous. Some coal balls from the US vary in age from the later end of the Westphalian (roughly 313 to 304 mya) to the later Stephanian (roughly 304 to 299 mya). European coal balls are generally from the early end of the Westphalian Stage.

In coal seams, coal balls are completely surrounded by coal. They are often found randomly scattered throughout the seam in isolated groups, usually in the upper half of the seam. Their occurrence in coal seams can be either extremely sporadic or regular; many coal seams have been found to contain no coal balls, while others have been found to contain so many coal balls that miners avoid the area entirely.

== Analytical methods ==
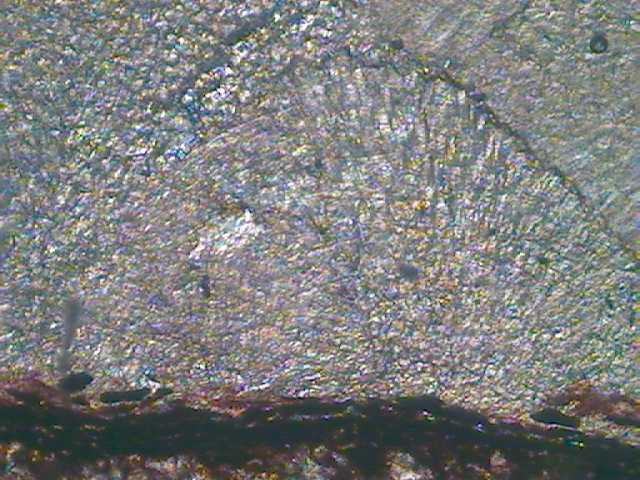
A thin section of a plant stem depicting calcite crystals.

Thin sectioning was an early procedure used to analyse fossilised material contained in coal balls. The process required cutting a coal ball with a diamond saw, then flattening and polishing the thin section with an abrasive. It would be glued to a slide and placed under a petrographic microscope for examination. Although the process could be done with a machine, the large amount of time needed and the poor quality of samples produced by thin sectioning gave way to a more convenient method.

The thin section technique was superseded by the now-common liquid-peel technique in 1928. In this technique, peels are obtained by cutting the surface of a coal ball with a diamond saw, grinding the cut surface on a glass plate with silicon carbide to a smooth finish, and etching the cut and the surface with hydrochloric acid. The acid dissolves the mineral matter from the coal ball, leaving a projecting layer of plant cells. After applying acetone, a piece of cellulose acetate is placed on the coal ball. This embeds the cells preserved in the coal ball into the cellulose acetate. Upon drying, the cellulose acetate can be removed from the coal ball with a razor and the obtained peel can be stained with a low-acidity stain and observed under a microscope. Up to 50 peels can be extracted from 2 millimetres (0.079 in) of coal ball with this method.

However, the peels will degrade over time if they contain any iron sulfide (pyrite or marcasite). Shya Chitaley addressed this problem by revising the liquid-peel technique to separate the organic material preserved by the coal ball from the inorganic minerals, including iron sulfide. This allows the peel to retain its quality for a longer time. Chitaley's revisions begin after grinding the surface of the coal ball to a smooth finish. Her process essentially entails heating and then making multiple applications of solutions of paraffin in xylene to the coal ball. Each subsequent application has a greater concentration of paraffin in xylene to allow the wax to completely pervade the coal ball. Nitric acid, and then acetone, are applied to the coal ball. Following that, the process merges back into the liquid peel technique.

X-ray powder diffraction has also been used to analyse coal balls. The X-rays of a predetermined wavelength are sent through a sample to examine its structure. This reveals information about the crystallographic structure, chemical composition, and physical properties of the examined material. The scattered intensity of the X-ray pattern is observed and analysed, with the measurements consisting of incident and scattered angle, polarisation, and wavelength or energy.

== See also ==
- Petrified wood

== Bibliography ==
- Andrews, Henry N. Jr (1951). "American Coal-Ball Floras". Botanical Review. 17 (6): 431–469. Bibcode:1951BotRv..17..431A. doi:10.1007/BF02879039. JSTOR 4353462. S2CID 28942723.
- Andrews, Henry N. (April 1946). "Coal Balls – A Key to the Past". The Scientific Monthly. 62 (4): 327–334. Bibcode:1946SciMo..62..327A. JSTOR 18958.
- Baxter, Robert W. (December 1951). "Coal Balls: New Discoveries in Plant Petrifactions from Kansas Coal Beds". Transactions of the Kansas Academy of Science. 54 (4): 526–535. doi:10.2307/3626215. JSTOR 3626215.
- Chitaley, Shya (1985). "A New Technique for Thin Sections of Pyritized Permineralizations". Review of Palaeobotany and Palynology. 45 (3–4): 301–306. Bibcode:1985RPaPa..45..301C. doi:10.1016/0034-6667(85)90005-3.
- Darrah, William Culp; Lyons, Paul C. (1995). Historical Perspective of Early Twentieth Century Carboniferous Paleobotany in North America. United States of America: Geological Society of America. ISBN 978-0-8137-1185-0.
- Demaris, Phillip J. (January 2000). "Formation and distribution of coal balls in the Herrin Coal (Pennsylvanian), Franklin County, Illinois Basin, USA". Journal of the Geological Society. 157 (1): 221–228. Bibcode:2000JGSoc.157..221D. doi:10.1144/jgs.157.1.221. S2CID 129037655.
- Evans, W. D.; Amos, Dewey H. (February 1961). "An Example of the Origin of Coal-Balls". Proceedings of the Geologists' Association. 72 (4): 445. Bibcode:1961PrGA...72..445E. doi:10.1016/S0016-7878(61)80038-2.
- Feliciano, José Maria (1 May 1924). "The Relation of Concretions to Coal Seams". The Journal of Geology. 32 (3): 230–239. Bibcode:1924JG.....32..230F. doi:10.1086/623086. JSTOR 30059936. S2CID 128663837.
- Gabel, Mark L.; Dyche, Steven E. (February 1986). "Making Coal Ball Peels to Study Fossil Plants". The American Biology Teacher. 48 (2): 99–101. doi:10.2307/4448216. JSTOR 4448216.
- Galtier, Jean (1997). "Coal-ball floras of the Namurian-Westphalian of Europe". Review of Palaeobotany and Palynology. 95 (1–4): 51–72. Bibcode:1997RPaPa..95...51G. doi:10.1016/S0034-6667(96)00027-9.
- Hooker, Joseph Dalton; Binney, Edward William (1855). "On the structure of certain limestone nodules enclosed in seams of bituminous coal, with a description of some trigonocarpons contained in them". Philosophical Transactions of the Royal Society. 145: 149–156. Bibcode:1855RSPT..145..149D. doi:10.1098/rstl.1855.0006. JSTOR 108514. S2CID 110524923. This article incorporates text from this source, which is in the public domain.
- Jeffrey, Edward C. (1917). "Petrified Coals and Their Bearing on the Problem of the Origin of Coals". Proceedings of the National Academy of Sciences of the United States of America. 3 (3): 206–211. Bibcode:1917PNAS....3..206J. doi:10.1073/pnas.3.3.206. PMC 1091213. PMID 16576220. This article incorporates text from this source, which is in the public domain.
- Jones, T. P.; Rowe, N. P. (1999). Fossil plants and spores: modern techniques. London: Geological Society. ISBN 978-1-86239-035-5.
- Kindle, E. M. (November 1934). "Concerning "Lake Balls," "Cladophora Balls" and "Coal Balls"". American Midland Naturalist. 15 (6): 752–760. doi:10.2307/2419894. JSTOR 2419894.
- Leighton, Morris W.; Peppers, Russel A. (16 May 2011). "ISGS – Our Heritage – A Memorial: Adolf C. Noé". University of Illinois Board of Trustees. Archived from the original on 4 December 2008.
- Lomax, James (1903). "On the occurrence of the nodular concretions (coal balls) in the lower coal measures". Report of the Annual Meeting. 72: 811–812. This article incorporates text from this source, which is in the public domain.
- Lyons, Paul C.; Thompson, Carolyn L.; Hatcher, Patrick G.; Brown, Floyd W.; Millay, Michael A.; Szeverenyi, Nikolaus; Maciel, Gary E. (1984). "Coalification of organic matter in coal balls of the Pennsylvanian (upper Carboniferous) of the Illinois Basin, United States". Organic Geochemistry. 5 (4): 227–239. Bibcode:1984OrGeo...5..227L. doi:10.1016/0146-6380(84)90010-X.
- Mamay, Sergius H.; Yochelson, Ellis L. (1962). "Occurrence and significance of marine animal remains in American coal balls". Shorter Contributions to General Geology: 193–224. Bibcode:1962usgs.rept....7M. doi:10.3133/pp354I. Geological Survey Professional Paper, Volume 354 at Google Books.
- Nelson, W. John (1983). "Geologic disturbances in Illinois coal seams" (PDF). 530. Illinois State Geological Survey. Archived from the original (PDF) on 17 April 2012.
- Noé, Adolph C. (June 1923b). "A Paleozoic Angiosperm". The Journal of Geology. 31 (4): 344–347. Bibcode:1923JG.....31..344N. doi:10.1086/623025. JSTOR 30078443. S2CID 129159972.
- Noé, Adolph C. (30 March 1923a). "Coal Balls". Science. 57 (1474): 385. Bibcode:1923Sci....57..385N. doi:10.1126/science.57.1474.385. JSTOR 1648633. PMID 17748916.
- Perkins, Thomas (1976). "Textures and Conditions of Formation of Middle Pennsylvanian Coal Balls, Central United States" (PDF). University of Kansas.
- Phillips, Tom; Avcin, Matthew J.; Berggren, Dwain (1976). "Fossil Peats from the Illinois Basin: A guide to the study of coal balls of Pennsylvanian age" (PDF). University of Illinois. Archived from the original (PDF) on 9 October 2011.
- Phillips, Tom L. "T L 'Tommy' Phillips, Department of Plant Biology, University of Illinois". University of Illinois. Archived from the original on 27 July 2011.
- Phillips, Tom L.; Pfefferkorn, Herman L.; Peppers, Russel A. (1973). "Development of Paleobotany in the Illinois Basin" (PDF). Illinois State Geological Survey. doi:10.5962/bhl.title.61485. hdl:2142/43012. Archived from the original (PDF) on 26 March 2012.
- Phillips, Tom L.; Peppers, Russel A. (February 1984). "Changing patterns of Pennsylvanian coal-swamp vegetation and implications of climatic control on coal occurrence". International Journal of Coal Geology. 3 (3): 205–255. Bibcode:1984IJCG....3..205P. doi:10.1016/0166-5162(84)90019-3.
- Scott, Andrew C.; Rex, G.M. (1985). "The formation and significance of Carboniferous coal balls" (PDF). Philosophical Transactions of the Royal Society. B 311 (1148): 123–137. Bibcode:1985RSPTB.311..123S. doi:10.1098/rstb.1985.0144. JSTOR 2396976.
- Seward, A. C. (2010). Plant Life Through the Ages: A Geological and Botanical Retrospect. Cambridge University Press. ISBN 978-1-108-01600-1.
- Seward, Albert Charles (1898). Fossil plants: a text-book for students of botany and geology. Cambridge University Press. pp. 84–87. This article incorporates text from this source, which is in the public domain.
- Stopes, Marie C.; Watson, David M. S. (1909). "On the Present Distribution and Origin of the Calcareous Concretions in Coal Seams, Known as 'Coal Balls'". Philosophical Transactions of the Royal Society. 200 (262–273): 167–218. Bibcode:1909RSPTB.200..167S. doi:10.1098/rstb.1909.0005. JSTOR 91931.
- "NMNH Paleobiology: Illustration Techniques". paleobiology.si.edu. Smithsonian Institution. 2007. Archived from the original on 26 August 2011.
- "Materials Research Lab – Introduction to X-ray Diffraction". Materials Research Lab. University of Santa Barbara, California. 2011. Archived from the original on 11 August 2011.
- "Ore Deposits Under Study – Chicago University professor to engage in research work". Evening Independent. 19 June 1923. p. 13.
- "Paleobotany". Cleveland Museum of Natural History. Archived from the original on 12 August 2011.
