= Walter Dearborn =

American educator and psychologist

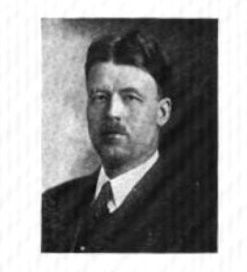
- Born: Walter Fenno Dearborn; July 19, 1878; Marblehead, Massachusetts
- Died: June 21, 1955 (aged 76); St. Petersburg, Florida
- Education: Phillips Exeter Academy; Wesleyan University
- Occupations: Educator, experimental psychologist

Walter Fenno Dearborn (July 19, 1878 – June 21, 1955) was a pioneering American educator and experimental psychologist who helped to establish the field of reading education. Dearborn, who approached the study of psychology from the perspective of an empirical scientist, is perhaps best known for using empirical research to design and refine teaching methods. Dearborn's research persuaded him that children develop at different rates and that schools should not ignore individual differences by teaching children in large groups or classes.

== Biography ==
Dearborn was born in Marblehead, Massachusetts. He attended Boston public schools and then Phillips Exeter Academy, graduating in 1896. He earned a bachelor's degree (1900) and a master's degree from Wesleyan University.

In 1903, Dearborn began studying for a doctorate at Columbia University where he was the student of James McKeen Cattell. His interest in the psychology of reading and human development promoted him to spend a year studying medicine at the University of Göttingen. He eventually returned to Germany to earn a Doctor of Medicine degree. Dearborn's dissertation was published under the title, The Psychology of Reading: An Experimental Study of the Reading Process and Eye-Movements (1906).

Dearborn's doctorate degree was quite important as it was an interest of his that remained consistent and provided for his greatest contributions to psychology. In a monograph entitled "Special Disabilities in learning to read and write" Dearborn contributed a section on "etiology of congenital and word blindness". Dearborn contributed a great deal to the function of the eye and "reading". He discovered that there were multiple type of readers including "part-word, whole word and mixed-type readers". Furthermore, Dearborn continued in producing a number of papers and research on reading disabilities.

After completing his doctoral studies, Dearborn joined the educational psychology faculty at the University of Wisconsin-Madison and then the faculty at the University of Chicago, where he was engaged in applied experimental psychology in solving practical problems. More specifically, as an educational psychologist Dearborn focused his interests in three main areas – reading problems, the relation between physical growth to intelligence, and intelligence tests. Dearborn pursued research in intelligence testing, predictors of academic success, and reading. In 1912, Dearborn accepted an invitation to join the faculty at Harvard University, where he became an associate professor in just seven years.

In 1917, Dearborn founded the Psycho-Educational Clinic at Harvard University and served as the director of the Harvard Growth Studies project, a major longitudinal study that provided data for many influential papers. These studies tracked physical measurements and "mental test findings" of approximately 3,500 subjects over a 12-year period beginning in the subject's first-grade year.

Dearborn's work was critical in disproving then-prevailing theories regarding strong correlations between physical and mental development. He also identified key developmental milestones that influence approaches to education and theories of human development to this day.

Dearborn retired from Harvard in 1942, then joined the education and psychology faculty at Lesley College, now Lesley University, in Cambridge, Massachusetts. At the time, Lesley College was operating several laboratory schools, including programs for students with special needs. These schools soon adopted methods that Dearborn had developed for teaching students of average to above average intelligence who were nonetheless struggling with reading and mathematics. The schools gave Dearborn and his students a real-life setting in which to experiment with instructional methods tailored to individual students. The success of these schools, which were consolidated and renamed the Walter F. Dearborn Academy, was one of Dearborn's proudest accomplishments.

Dearborn was made a trustee of various institutions. These included: the Massachusetts State Infirmary twice from 1913 to 1914 and 1915 to 1933, Walter E. Fernald School from 1942. He was also a member of the Council of American Psychological Association from 1918 to 1920.

Dearborn died in St. Petersburg, Florida, on June 21, 1955, from complications following a severe brain hemorrhage.

== Contributions to psychology and education ==
Dearborn's career included important contributions to the fields of reading education, cognitive psychology, educational assessment, and child development. Most significant has been his research in reading differences, eye-movement and visual fatigue, child development, intelligence testing, and the sociology of unemployment in young people.

Dearborn provided critical frameworks for understanding and treating reading difficulties and was among the first psychologists to refute the generally held view of "congenital word blindness" (now known as dyslexia). Recognizing the wide range of abilities and differences that normal children can have, Dearborn showed that reading difficulties and intellectual capacities were not always connected and that pupils with average and above average intelligence may process language in different ways, thus creating challenges in the way reading was taught. In describing the difficulties some students had with reading, Dearborn wrote, "There are quite possibly cases with no intellectual defect or shortcoming either general or specific, where a combination of unfortunate circumstances combined with faulty learning may result in a disability as grave as that for which the word 'blindness' has been commonly reserved." Dearborn later developed successful methods for teaching reading to students with dyslexia. The discrepancy model for the diagnosis of dyslexia is rooted in the work of Dearborn.

From observing the differences he observed in the ways individuals students' learned to read, Dearborn came to believe that there were many possible ways to learn reading and that no single approach would be best for every child. By 1925, in what would be a precursor to later debates about whole language versus phonics approaches to teaching reading, Dearborn noted that for some students the "look-say" approach to learning reading was more successful than phonetic or auditory approaches. He encouraged his students to observe classrooms where look-say was being used and suggested that teachers not focus exclusively on phonics and advocated a balanced literacy approach.

Dearborn's work on eye movements in reading is one of the most comprehensive studies in the literature. Richard L. Venezky has written that Dearborn "covered among other topics the number and duration of fixation pauses, re-fixations, and eye fatigue in reading." He raised questions about the relationships between the orthographic structure of words and their pronunciation——problems which remain unresolved. One of Dearborn's most interesting discoveries was that children who were left-eyed, were more likely to have reading difficulties than students who were right-eyed.

Dearborn's most widely cited publications also include Intelligence Tests: Their Significance For School And Society (Houghton Mifflin Co., Boston, 1928). At the time, intelligence testing was still in its infancy and there was not yet consensus in the field about goals of testing. A strong proponent of intelligence testing, Dearborn believed that tests could help uncover students' needs and guide teachers in their instruction. Dearborn shows that intelligence as measured by the tests of his day was not a constant, but varied based on the subject's learning and experience. "He has aimed a pointed and well-delivered attack against beliefs that the results of intelligence tests are due to nature solely. In fact he has gone further and minimized nature and emphasized nurture--boldly attacking many widely held theories and substituting others in keeping with his systematic point of view."

Dearborn's wide-ranging approach to the study of the process of reading also included a close study of typography and typographic conventions. He wrote an influential paper on type faces, which might be regarded as one of the earliest examples of work in the area of the psychology of industrial design.

A strong proponent of individualized instruction, Dearborn believed that the grade and classroom approach that characterizes much of American education did not serve ultimately students well. He challenged educators and school systems to think differently about what schools could be and how the process of education might be better carried out.

No problem of education is more important than that which involved the adaptation of instruments to the capacities and needs of the children who are to be educated. Every parent, for the same of his children, every citizen, for the sake of society, every teacher for the sake of her pupils, and every school officer as a measure of the education provided should ask these questions: Is the child in the school located in the grade and class best suited to him? Are the subject matter and methods of instruction properly adapted to his capacities and stage of progress? Is the school so organized that, within necessary limits each child may progress in his education at the rate demanded by his individual abilities and needs? Have all reasonably possible means been employed to classify pupils in instructional groups according to their various capacities?

== Publications ==
Walter F. Dearborn is the author of numerous books and articles on education, and reading, many of them still in print. He is also honored as a Reading Pioneer at the Reading Hall of Fame.

The following is a selection of works by Walter F Dearborn:

- The Psychology of Teaching Reading
- The Psychology of Reading: An Experimental Study of the Reading Pauses and Movements of the Eye (Paperback - Feb. 12, 2010)
- A Comparison Of The Intelligence And Training Of School Children In A Massachusetts Town: Series 1, No. 1, Studies In Educational Psychology And Educational Measurement (1922) Edwin Adams Shaw (Author), Edward Andrews Lincoln (Author), Walter F. Dearborn (Editor)
- School and University Grades (Paperback)
- Predicting The Child's Development
- The Psychological Researches Of James McKeen Cattell: A Review By Some Of His Pupils (1914) by Vivian Allen Charles Henmon, Walter Fenno Dearborn, and Frederic Lyman Wells (Hardcover - February 17, 2010)
- Reading and Visual Fatigue by Leonard and Dearborn, Carmichael (Hardcover - 1947)
- Research Within The Field Of Education, Its Organization And Encouragement (1911) by Ellwood Patterson Cubberley, Walter F. Dearborn, and Paul Monroe
