= Adolf Carl Noé =

American paleontologist

- Born: Adolf Carl Noé von Archenegg; October 28, 1873; Graz, Austria
- Died: April 10, 1939 (aged 65)
- Education: University of Chicago
- Known for: Coal ball and paleobotanical studies
- Spouse: Mary Evelyn Cullatin

Adolf Carl Noé (born Adolf Carl Noé von Archenegg; 28 October 1873 – 10 April 1939) was an Austrian-born paleobotanist. He is credited for identifying the first coal ball in the United States in 1922, which renewed interest in them. He also developed a method of peeling coal balls using nitrocellulose. Many of the paleobotanical materials owned by the University of Chicago's Walker Museum were provided by Noé, where he was also a curator of fossil plants. He was also a research associate at the Field Museum of Natural History, where he assisted with their reconstruction of a Carboniferous forest.

== Biography ==
=== Early years ===
From 1894 to 1897, Noé attended the University of Graz, studying paleobotany under Constantin von Ettingshausen. After Ettinghausen's death, Noé moved to Germany in 1897, having been transferred to the University of Göttingen. While a young man, Noé served briefly in the cavalry as a member of the 8th Austrian Hussars.

He studied there until 1899, when he moved to the United States. During that year, Noé began his work at the University of Chicago. He obtained a B. A. in 1900. Later in that year Noé married the former Mary Evelyn Cullatin. The pair had two daughters, Mary Helen Noé (who later married Nobel laureate Robert S. Mulliken) and Valerie Noé.

In 1901, he moved to California to teach German at Stanford University. Four years later, in 1905, Noé earned a Ph.D. in Germanic Languages and Literatures.

Noé taught at the University of Chicago from the 1910s, continuing his interest in the mounted soldiery as member of the 1st Illinois Cavalry in 1915 and 1916, during which he attended training camps at Fort Sheridan and Plattsburg.

Near the end of World War I, Noé removed "von Archenegg" from his name to avoid anti-German sentiment. Noé also stopped teaching German classes to research paleobotany, due to overstaffing and the public's disinterest in taking the German courses. Following the war, Noé participated in reconstruction efforts in his native Austria, work for which he was awarded a gold medal from the University of Vienna and the gold cross of honor from the government of the Republic of Austria.

=== Paleobotanical work ===
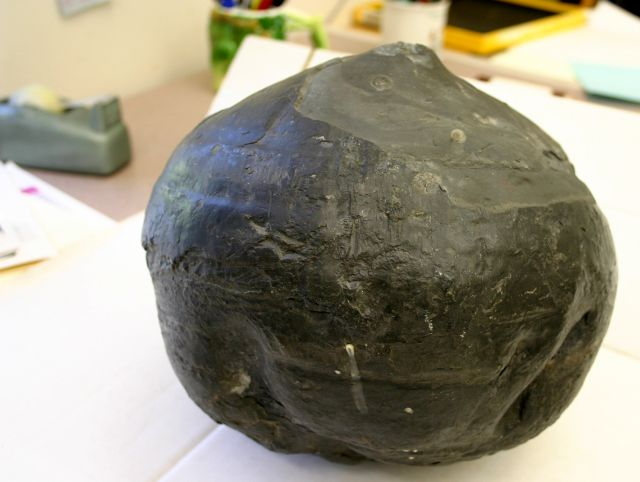
A coal ball

Noé became a geologist for the Allan and Garcia Coal Commission in the Soviet Union in 1927, ten years after the October Revolution. There, in the Donets coal basin, Noé did work as a mining geologist, where he fulfilled a contract granted by the Soviet government assessing the state of coal production in the region. Upon his return to the United States he published a memoir of his journey, Golden Days of Soviet Russia.

In 1934, Noé became the Field Museum of Natural History's research associate, and assisted in the construction of a Pennsylvanian coal swamp there.

=== Studies on coal balls ===
Coal balls in North America were found in Iowa coal seams since the 1890s, although the connection to European coal balls was not made until Noé (whose coal ball was actually found by Gilbert Cady) drew the parallel in 1922. There was some disbelief over Noé's discovery. For instance, in 1922, Noé was contacted by David White, who strongly believed that coal balls could not be found in North America. Noé later managed to convince him otherwise by showing him a wheelbarrow full of Illinois coal balls, after which White never spoke to Noé again.

=== Death ===
While translating the final chapter of a publication about coal in his office, Noé suffered a paralytic stroke on March 11, 1939. He died on the morning of April 10, five months before his planned retirement date of October 1939.
