= Richard Cattell =

Richard Cattell may refer to:

- Richard Cattell (rugby union) (1871–1948), English rugby union player
- Richard Cattell (surgeon) (1900–1964), American surgeon
