= The Scientific Monthly =

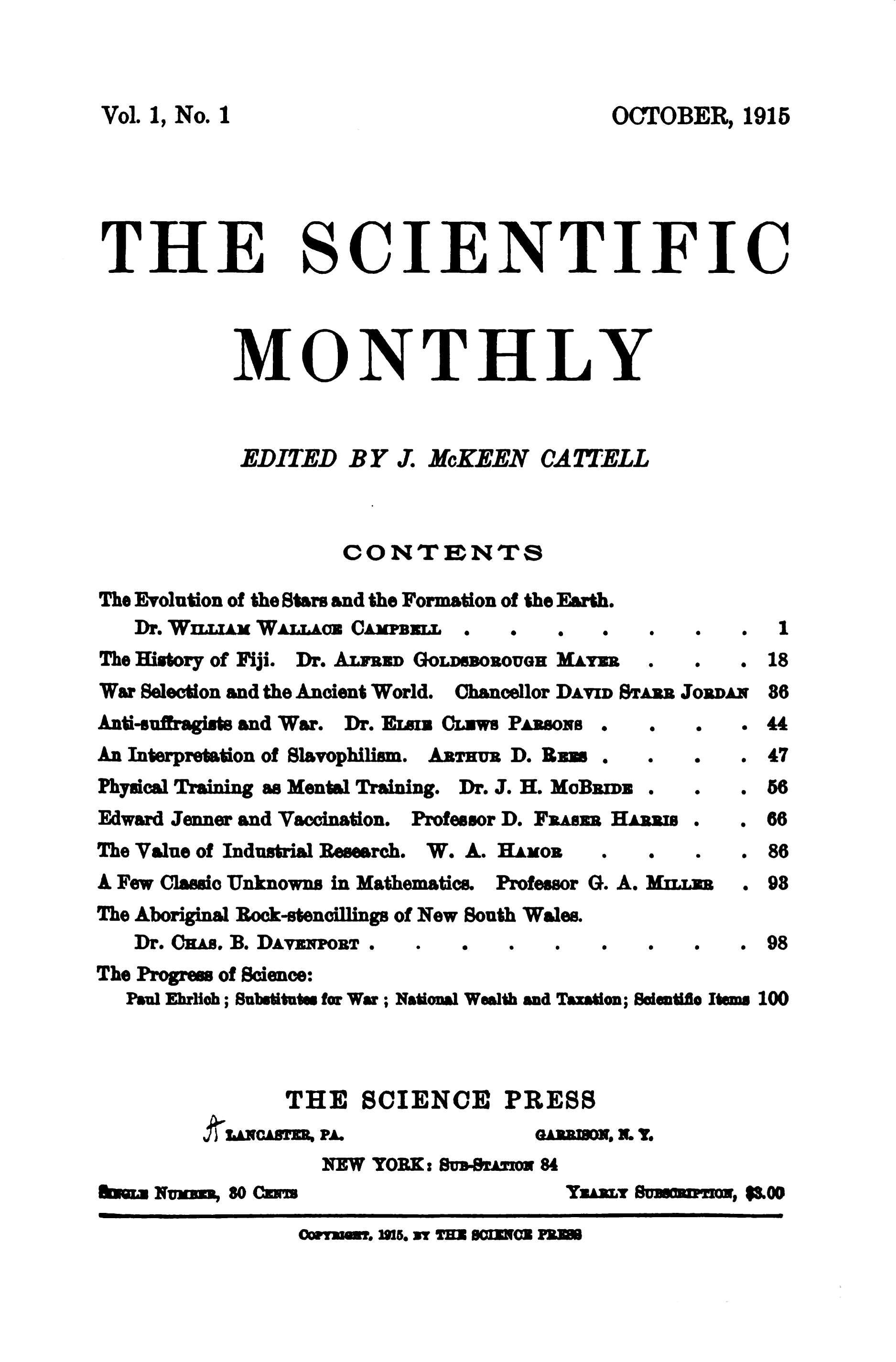
- First issue, October 1915
- Editor: James McKeen Cattell
- Categories: Science
- Frequency: Monthly
- Publisher: James McKeen Cattell
- First issue: October 1915
- Final issue: 1957
- Company: The Science Press
- Country: USA
- Based in: New York City
- Language: English
- ISSN: 0096-3771
- OCLC: 1765233

The Scientific Monthly was a science magazine published from 1915 to 1957. Psychologist James McKeen Cattell, the former publisher and editor of The Popular Science Monthly, was the original founder and editor. In 1958, The Scientific Monthly was absorbed by Science.
