= James McKeen Cattell =

American psychologist and educator (1860–1944)

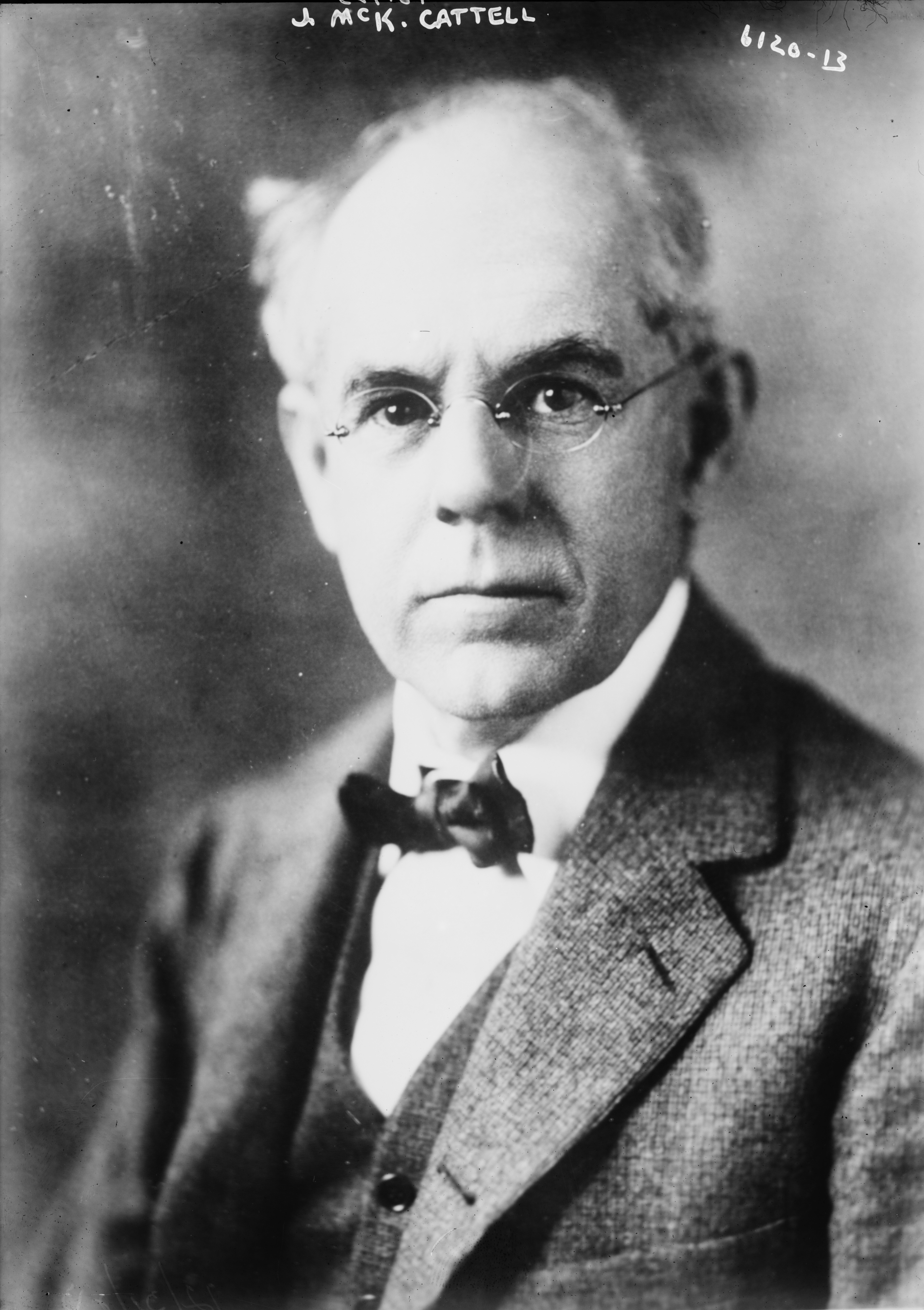
- Born: May 25, 1860; Easton, Pennsylvania, U.S.
- Died: January 20, 1944 (aged 83); Lancaster, Pennsylvania, U.S.
- Education: Lafayette College (BA, MA); University of Leipzig (PhD)
- Spouse: Josephine Owen (m. 1888)
- Children: 7, including Psyche
- Father: William Cassady Cattell
- Scientific career
- Fields: Psychology, psychometrics
- Workplaces: University of Cambridge; University of Pennsylvania; Columbia University
- Doctoral advisor: Wilhelm Wundt
- Doctoral students: John Dashiell; Walter Dearborn; Shepherd Ivory Franz; Harry L. Hollingworth; Edward Kellog Strong Jr. Edward Thorndike; Robert S. Woodworth

James McKeen Cattell (/kəˈtɛl/; May 25, 1860 – January 20, 1944) was the first professor of psychology in the United States, teaching at the University of Pennsylvania in Philadelphia. He was a long-time editor and publisher of scientific journals and publications, including Science, and served on the board of trustees for Science Service, now known as Society for Science from 1921 to 1944.

At the beginning of Cattell's career, many scientists regarded psychology as a minor field of study, or as a pseudoscience like phrenology. Cattell helped establish psychology as a legitimate science, worthy of study at the highest levels of the academy. At the time of his death, The New York Times credited him as "the dean of American science".

Cattell was uncompromisingly opposed to American involvement in World War I. His public opposition to the draft led to his dismissal from his position at Columbia University, which later led many American universities to establish academic tenure as a means of protecting unpopular beliefs.

== Early life and education ==
Cattell was born in Easton, Pennsylvania, on May 25, 1860, the eldest child of a wealthy and prominent family. His father, William Cassady Cattell, a Presbyterian minister, became president of Lafayette College in Easton shortly after James' birth. In 1859, William Cattell married Elizabeth "Lizzie" McKeen; together, they shared Lizzie's substantial inheritance. James' uncle Alexander G. Cattell represented New Jersey in the United States Senate.

Cattell entered Lafayette College in 1876 at the age of sixteen and graduated in four years with the highest honors. In 1883, the faculty at Lafayette awarded him an M.A., again with highest honors. At Lafayette, Cattell spent most of his time devouring English literature and also showed a gift for mathematics. Cattell said Francis March, a philologist, was a great influence during his time at Lafayette.

Cattell found his calling after arriving in Germany for doctoral studies, where he was supervised by Wilhelm Wundt at University of Leipzig. He also studied under Hermann Lotze at the University of Göttingen. An essay on Lotze won Cattell a fellowship at Johns Hopkins University in Baltimore.

In October 1882, Cattell left Germany for his fellowship in October 1882. The fellowship was not renewed, and Cattell returned to Leipzig the next year as Wundt's assistant.

The partnership between Wundt and Cattell proved highly productive; the two helped to establish the formal study of intelligence. Under Wundt, Cattell became the first American to publish a dissertation in the field of psychology. The title of his German dissertation was Psychometrische Untersuchungen (Psychometric Investigation); it was accepted by the University of Leipzig in 1886. Cattell tried to explore the interiors of his own mind through the consumption of the then-legal drug hashish. Under the influence of this drug, Cattell once compared the whistling of a schoolboy to a symphony orchestra.

== Career ==
=== Academia ===
After completing his Ph.D. with Wundt in Germany in 1886, Cattell took up a lecturing post at the University of Cambridge in England, and became a Fellow of St. John's College at the University of Cambridge. He made occasional visits to the U.S., where he gave lectures at Bryn Mawr College in Bryn Mawr, Pennsylvania, and the University of Pennsylvania in Philadelphia.

In 1889, he returned to the U.S. to become a professor of psychology at the University of Pennsylvania. In 1891, he moved to Columbia University, where he became department head of psychology, anthropology, and philosophy. In 1895, he was appointed president of the American Psychological Association. In 1888, he was elected a member of the American Philosophical Society.

From the beginning of his career, Cattell worked to establish psychology as a field as worthy of study as any of the physical sciences, such as chemistry or physics. He believed that further investigation would reveal that intellect itself could be parsed into standard units of measurements. He also established the methods of Wilhelm Wundt and Francis Galton, including mental testing, in the U.S.

In 1917, Cattell and English professor Henry Wadsworth Longfellow Dana, grandson of Henry Wadsworth Longfellow and Richard Henry Dana Jr., were fired from Columbia University for opposing the United States’ conscription policy during World War I. He later sued the university and won an annuity. In 1921, he used the money that he gained from the settlement to start The Psychological Corporation to foster his interest in applied psychology. Because he was never able to really explain how psychologists apply their work, the organization failed until it was taken over by other psychologists who had experience in applied psychology. Towards the end of his life, Cattell edited and published journals. To help himself in the process, he created the Science Press Printing Company in order to produce his journals. He continued his work on journals until his death in 1944.

=== Eugenicist beliefs ===
Like many eminent scientists and scholars of the time, Cattell's thought was influenced by belief in eugenics, defined as the "applied science or the bio-social movement which advocates the use of practices aimed at improving the genetic composition of a population, usually referring to human populations." Cattell's belief in eugenics was heavily influenced by the research of Charles Darwin, whose theory of evolution motivated Cattell's emphasis on studying “the psychology of individual differences”.

In connection with his eugenicist beliefs, Cattell's own research found that men of science were likely to have fathers who were clergymen or professors. Incidentally, Cattell's father was both.

Cattell believed that he had “inherited ability", but he also credited the influence of his environment, saying "it was my fortune to find a birthplace in the sun. A germplasm fairly well compounded [good genes] met circumstances to which it was unusually fit to react”. Cattell's belief in eugenics even motivated him to offer his own children monetary gifts of $1,000 if they married the offspring of a university professor or academic professional.

=== Mental tests ===
Cattell's research on individual differences played a significant role in introducing and emphasizing the experimental technique and importance of methodology in experimentation in America. Cattell's design of mental tests was influenced by Wundt's definition of psychology regarding the achievements of psychophysics and by Galton's view on the importance of the senses for judgement and intelligence. Regarding the beginnings of his mental tests, in Leipzig, Cattell independently began to measure “simple mental processes”

Between 1883 and 1886, influenced by Francis Galton, Cattell published nine articles on human reaction time rates and individual differences. As a professor at the University of Pennsylvania, Cattell administered a battery of ten tests to student volunteers, and for the first time introduced the term "mental tests" as a general term for his set of tests. These tests included measures of sensation, using weights to determine just-noticeable differences, reaction time, human memory span, and rate of movement. There are two types of perspectives on measuring intelligence. The first type was derived from Aristotle that asserts that it is only through the identification of intelligence that its measurement becomes possible; through identification does not necessarily imply a definition. Secondly, all measurement is based on comparison, and that different bases of comparison are possible. When Cattell moved to Columbia University, the battery of tests became compulsory for all freshmen. Cattell believed that his mental tests were measuring intelligence; however, in 1901 Clark Wissler, a student of Cattell, demonstrated that there was no statistical relationship between scores on Cattell's tests and academic performance. The tests were finally rendered irrelevant with the development of Alfred Binet’s intelligence measurements.

=== Journals ===
Cattell was well known for his involvement in creating and editing scientific journals. He was so involved in owning and publishing journals, that his research productivity declined. Along with James Mark Baldwin, he co-founded the journal Psychological Review. He also acquired the journal Science and, within five years of acquiring it, made it the official publication of the American Association for the Advancement of Science.

In 1900, Cattell purchased Popular Science Monthly from D. Appleton & Company. In 1915, the title was purchased from him and became Popular Science. He, in turn, founded and edited The Scientific Monthly, which went to the subscribers of the old Popular Science Monthly as a substitute.

Cattell was the editor of Science for nearly 50 years. During that time, he did much to promote psychology as a science by seeing to it that empirical studies in psychology were prominently featured in the journal. On Cattell's editorship of Science, Ludy T. Benjamin wrote "there is no denying that it significantly enhanced psychology’s visibility and status among the older sciences."

=== American Men of Science ===
In 1906, Cattell became the first compiler of American Men of Science. Despite the name, two women, Grace Andrews and Charlotte Angas Scott, were listed in this first edition of American Men of Science.

=== Skepticism ===
Cattell was skeptical of paranormal claims and spiritualism. He dismissed Leonora Piper as a fraud. He was involved in a debate over Piper with the psychologist William James in the Science journal. He took issue with James's support for psychical research. In a letter to James, Cattell wrote that the "Society for Psychical Research is doing much to injure psychology".

== Personal life ==
Cattell married Josephine Owen, the daughter of an English merchant, in 1888. Their seven children obtained their pre-college educations at home with their parents as instructors. The whole family shared in Cattell's editorial work. One daughter, Psyche Cattell (1893–1989), followed in her father's footsteps, establishing a small child psychology practice in Lancaster, Pennsylvania, and developing tests to assess the intelligence of infants.

== Death ==
Cattell died at Lancaster General Hospital in Lancaster, Pennsylvania, on January 20, 1944, at age 83.

== Legacy ==
The main street in the College Hill neighborhood of Easton, Pennsylvania, home to Lafayette College, Cattell's alma mater, is named after Cattell.
