= Psyche Cattell =

American child psychologist (1893–1989)

- Born: August 2, 1893; Garrison, New York, U.S.
- Died: April 17, 1989 (aged 95); Lititz, Pennsylvania, U.S.
- Known for: Cattell Infant Intelligence Scale
- Children: 2
- Parent: James McKeen Cattell

Academic background
- Education: Cornell University (MA); Harvard University (M.Ed., Ed.D.)

Psyche Cattell (/kəˈtɛl/; August 2, 1893 – April 17, 1989) was an American psychologist who studied children and aimed to develop intelligence tests for infants. She was Chief Psychologist at Lancaster Guidance Clinic in Lancaster, Pennsylvania from 1939 to 1963. She published a book on intelligence testing and established a nursery school in her home which operated from 1941 to 1974. She is best known for the Cattell Infant Intelligence Scale, a downward extension of IQ testing used to assess children's development.

== Early life and education ==
Cattell was born to James McKeen Cattell and Josephine Owen Cattell in Garrison, New York, on August 2, 1893. Her father was a notable psychologist and professor at the University of Pennsylvania and Columbia University.

As a psychologist, James Cattell actively shaped his children's educational environment. He home schooled them with the support of visiting educators and tutors. Psyche Cattell often fell behind her siblings, perhaps due to undiagnosed dyslexia. Because of her struggles, her father did not support her academic aspirations. As a result, she became a research assistant in order to save up money for college.

When she earned enough tuition money, she attended Barnard College from 1912 to 1914 and Sargent School of Physical Education from 1913 to 1917. She eventually gained admission to Cornell University but, without a high school diploma, she was denied an undergraduate degree. In 1925, she received a Master of Arts degree from Cornell and a Master of Education degree from Harvard University. She went on to receive a Doctor of Education degree from Harvard in 1927.

== Career ==
Cattell was a research assistant at Harvard University, starting in 1922, and Stanford University from 1925 to 1926. She remained a research assistant at Harvard until 1936. Her time at Harvard is what led her to further research on methods of testing infants' IQs. She went to California to work with Lewis Terman on the Stanford Achievement Test and the development of a masculinity-femininity test.

After her work at Stanford, she returned to Harvard in 1927. While working as a research assistant at Harvard she participated in and assisted with many tests regarding intelligence in children. While a research assistant, she discovered that many of these mental tests could be improved, as they pertained more to school aged children than to infants. By 1932, she was named a research fellow at Harvard and began developing a new testing method, which resulted in the Cattell Infant Intelligence Scale and was published in her book, The Measurement of Intelligence of Infants and Young Children in 1940. She was also an instructor in mental testing for the nursery training school of Boston. Throughout summers she attended many courses at institutions including Woods Hole Marine Biological Laboratory, the Mount Desert Island Biological Laboratory, and the University of Vienna.

Cattell moved to Lancaster, Pennsylvania, where her brother was living, in 1939 to become chief psychologist at the Lancaster Guidance Clinic. She spent the rest of her life in the area. She was also a psychologist at the Lancaster County Mental Health Clinic from 1939 to 1943. She established a school for young children in her house, known originally as West End Nursery School and West End Nursery School and Kindergarten, in 1941. It became known as The Cattell School, and was formally renamed in 1945. She continued to operate it after her 1963 retirement from Lancaster Guidance Clinic until her 80th birthday in 1974.

She wrote a book, Raising Children with Love and Limits, based on her experiences in 1972. She also wrote a column for the local newspaper Lancaster New Era titled "Children Under Eight".

=== Cattell Infant Intelligence Scale ===
While working at Harvard, she began performing research for her book, The Measurement of Intelligence of Infants and Young Children, and was led to develop better ways to evaluate brain development in infants. Cattell assisted with many developmental intelligence tests which revolved around the brain development of children and the impact of their environment on it. These tests aimed to examine the ability of children aged from 2–30 months old. She derived this test from the Stanford-Binet scale and the work she did at Harvard University. She identified the issue with the available tests at the time, and therefore attempted to implement a new method of testing which worked for younger children. The goal of these tests was to analyze brain development in young children as well as identify the ways in which birth conditions affect the central nervous system. Cattell administered these tests using a variety of toys for each age group tested; each age level had five different items. She created a standardized form of testing early mental ability through these tests, administering 1,346 examinations to 274 children.

The Cattell Infant Intelligence Scale was considered particularly impactful because of its younger age range, short administration time, and easy scoring methods. Cattell implemented significant changes to the test by taking into account the use of objects which may be influenced by home life, and removing them from the test in order to make the test more objective. She published her findings in her book, The Measurement of Intelligence of Infants and Young Children, and sold some kits to perform the scale commercially. The scale is useful because, while it is not able to identify specific problems in a child's development, it may catch that there is a problem early on.

The test primarily assesses motor control and also verbalisation. Later researchers have found that the test is poorly predictive but that "low scores on the scale appear to have greater predictive validity than high scores, particularly when the child has an unfavourable medical history or an impoverished social environment."

== Academic and professional work ==
- Research assistant, Harvard Growth Study, Harvard University (1922–1925)
- Research assistant in Psychology under Lewis Terman, Stanford University (1925–1926)
- Research Fellow, Harvard University School of Public Health (1932–1939)
- Instructor in Mental Testing, The Nursery Training School of Boston (1936–1938)
- Psychologist, Lebanon County Mental Health Clinic, Lebanon, Pennsylvania (1939–1942)
- Chief Psychologist, Guidance Clinic of Lancaster, Pennsylvania (1939–1963)
- Maintained Private Practice (1939–1972)
- Published the Cattell Infant Intelligence Scale (1940)
- Founder and Director of The West End Nursery School (later renamed The Cattell School), Lancaster, Pennsylvania (1941–1974)

== Notable works ==
Psyche Cattell is the author of various books and articles:

- The Eruption and Growth of the Permanent Teeth. Journal of Dental Research, 8, 279-287 (1928). doi:10.1177/00220345280080021001
- Dentition As a Measure of Maturity. (Harvard Monog. Educ. No.9). Cambridge: Harvard University Press. (1928). OCLC 492563835
- The Development of Intelligence and Motor Control in Infancy. Review of Educational Research. 6, 3–16. (1936). doi:10.2307/1167937
- The Development of Motor Functions and Mental Abilities in Infancy. Review of Educational Research. 9, 5–17. (1939). doi:10.3102/00346543009001005
- The Measurement of Intelligence of Infants and Young Children. NY: Psychological Corporation (1940) ISBN 0384079253
- Intelligence of Infants and Its Measurement. Transactions of the New York Academy of Science. 3,162-71. (1941). doi:10.1111/j.2164-0947.1941.tb00796.x
- Raising children with Love and Limits. Chicago: Nelson-Hall (1972). ISBN 0911012206

== Personal life ==
Cattell never married, but did adopt two children; a son, Hudson, in 1931 and a daughter, Jowain, in 1940.

== Later life and death ==
Cattell had a stroke in March 1987, which forced her to move from her Lancaster home. Cattell died on April 17, 1989, at Moravian Manor in Lititz, Pennsylvania.
