= Hansell Baugh =

American writer (1903–1995)

- Born: Robert Hansell Baugh; December 16, 1903; Pulaski, Tennessee, U.S.
- Died: January 8, 1995 (aged 91); Maitland, Florida, U.S.
- Education: Emory University (BA)
- Occupations: Writer and Librarian

Robert Hansell Baugh (December 16, 1903 – January 8, 1995) was an American writer and librarian.

== Biography ==
Robert Hansell Baugh was the son of Atha Thomas Baugh (1855–1934) and Margaret "Maggie" May McCord Baugh of Pulaski, Tennessee. The family moved to Atlanta, Georgia when Baugh was young, and he graduated as valedictorian and senior class president from the University School for Boys in 1921. He would then enroll at Emory University. In 1922, Baugh was recipient of the prestigious McCord Latin Prize from the Emory classics department.

From 1925 to 1930, Baugh worked for the United States Rubber Company as assistant editor in the publicity and publication department. As part of this job, he traveled to Sumatra and Malay making an educational film about the growing of rubber on rubber plantations.

Other jobs included secretary at Lawson General Hospital, an Army hospital in Atlanta, Georgia, and librarian for the College of Physicians in Philadelphia, Pennsylvania and the Institute of General Semantics in Connecticut. He was also a book reviewer and freelance writer. A close friend of author Frances Newman, Baugh edited her letters after Newman's death. He also served as editor of the little magazine The Figure in the Carpet: A Magazine of Prose.

Baugh died on January 8, 1995, in Maitland, Florida.

== Books ==
- Frances Newman's Letters. New York: Horace Liveright, 1929.
- Papers from the First American Congress for General Semantics. Chicago: Institute of General Semantics, 1938.

== Articles and essays ==
- "Art Lovers' Circle." The Courier-Journal Junior, vol. 131, no. 18582, 16 Nov. 1919, p. 3.
- "The Decade's Menace." The Reviewer, vol. 3, nos. 5-6, Oct. 1922, pp. 674–681.
- "Dr. Jekyll and Mrs. Hyde." The Reviewer, vol. 2, no. 6, Mar. 1922, pp. 328–333.
- "Emerson and the Elder Henry James." Bookman, vol. 68, no. 3, Nov. 1928, pp. 320–322.
- "Music and the Mediterranean." Musical Quarterly, vol. 12, no. 4, Oct. 1926, pp. 623–630.
- "Music Lovers Circle." The Courier-Journal Junior, vol. 131, no. 18561, 26 Oct. 1919, p. 4.
- "National Period." The Reviewer, vol. 3, nos. 11-12, Jul. 1923, pp. 948–951.
- "Nietzsche and His Music." Musical Quarterly, vol. 12, no. 2, Apr. 1926, pp. 238–247.
- "Palladio Adempto." The Reviewer, vol. 3, no. 4, Jul. 1922, pp. 563–567.
- "The 'Sensory' Element." 1924, vol. 1, no. 1, Jul. 1924, pp. 21–24.
- "Urbana, Ill." The Reviewer, vol. 2, no. 3, Dec. 1921, pp. 122–127.
- "What's Wrong with Authors!" [letter to the editor]. Saturday Review, vol. 23, no. 3, 9 Nov. 1940, p. 9.

== Book reviews ==
- "Americans by Stuart P. Sherman." Double Dealer, vol. 6, no. 31, Jan. 1924, pp. 35–36.
- "The Apple of the Eye by Glenway Wescott." The Guardian, vol. 1, no. 2, Dec. 1924, pp. 57–58.
- "Beasts, Men and Gods by Ferdinand Ossendowski." Atlanta Journal Magazine, vol. 41, no. 100, 3 Jun. 1923, p. 24.
- "Behind Moroccan Walls by Henriette Celarie." Bookman, vol. 74, no. 6, Mar. 1932, p. 688.
- "Du Cubisme au Classicisme by Gino Severini." The Freeman, vol. 7, no. 165, 9 May 1923, p. 212.
- "Dublin Days by L. A. G. Strong." Atlanta Journal Magazine, vol. 41, no. 79, 13 May 1923, p. 22.
- "Five Masters: A Study in the Mutations of the Novel by Joseph Wood Krutch." Sewanee Review, vol. 39, no. 4, Oct.-Dec. 1931, pp. 507-510.
- "The Flame of Islam by Harold Lamb." New Republic, vol. 66, no. 854, 15 Apr. 1931, pp. 244–245.
- "Henry James: Letters to A. C. Benson and Auguste Monod edited by E. F. Benson." Sewanee Review, vol. 39, no. 4, Oct.-Dec. 1931, pp. 504–507.
- "History of Contemporary French Literature by Rene Lalou." The Guardian, vol. 1, no. 6, Apr. 1925, pp. 264–266.
- "Innocence Abroad by Emily Clark." Sewanee Review, vol. 39, no. 4, Oct.-Dec. 1931, pp. 492–494.
- "Jessup by Newton Fuessle." Atlanta Journal Magazine, vol. 41, no. 58, 22 Apr. 1923, p. 22.
- "Letters of Giacomo Puccini edited by Giuseppe Adami." Bookman, vol. 74, no. 3, Nov. 1931, pp. 329-330.
- "The Life and Letters of Edmund Gosse by Evan Charteris. New Republic, vol. 68, no. 877, 23 Sep. 1931, p. 159.
- "Malaise by Henry Fauconnier." New Republic, vol. 69, no. 888, 9 Dec. 1931, pp. 108-109.
- "A Man from Maine by Edward W. Bok." Atlanta Journal, vol. 41, no. 107, 10 Jun. 1923, p. 28.
- "The Meaning of the Glorious Koran by Marmaduke Pickthall." Bookman, vol. 75, no. 2, May 1932, pp.191-192.
- "The Origin and Growth of Religion by W. Schmidt. Bookman, vol. 73, no. 5, p. 542.
- "Religions of the World by Carl Clemens, et. al." Bookman, vol. 73, no. 1, p. 98-99.
- "The Return of the Soldier by Rebecca West." New York Tribune, vol. 8, 3 Sep. 1922.
- "The Satyricon translated by J. M. Mitchell." The Freeman, vol. 7, no., 182, 5 Sep. 1923, pp. 622-623.
- "A Season in Hell: The Life of Arthur Rimbaud by Jean-Marie Carre, translated by Hannah and Matthew Josephson and Lettres de la Vie Litteraire D'Arthur Rimbaud by J M. Carre." The Symposium, vol. 3, no. 1, Jan. 1932, pp. 97-106.
- "Since Mrs. Eddy by Altman K. Swihart." Bookman, vol. 75, no. 1, Apr. 1932, pp.90-91.
- "Six Moral Tales from Jules Laforgue translated by Frances Newman." Bookman, vol. 68, no. 6, Feb. 1921, pp. 711-712.
- "The Three James: A Family of Minds by C. Hartley Grattan." The Symposium, vol. 4, no., 2, Apr. 1933, pp. 217-227.
- "The Two Carlyles by Osbert Burdett." New Republic, vol. 67, no. 863, 17 Jun. 1931, p. 132.
- "West and East by Clare Sheridan." Atlanta Journal Magazine, vol. 41, no. 72, 6 May 1923, p. 28.
- "The World in Falseface by George Jean Nathan." Atlanta Journal Magazine, vol. 41, no. 86, 20 May 1923, p. 28.

== Poems ==
- "Ambitions." The Courier-Journal Junior, vol. 132, no. 18827, 18 Jul. 1920, p. 1.
- "Approach of Spring." The Courier-Journal, vol. 130, no. 18316, 23 Feb. 1919, p. 8-2.
- "An Artistic Tragedy." The Courier-Journal Junior, vol. 132, no. 18743, 25 Apr. 1920, p. 3.
- "At Delaney's." The Courier-Journal Junior, vol. 132, no. 18722, 4 Apr. 1920, p. 3.
- "Autumn." The Courier-Journal Junior, vol. 132, no. 18694, 7 Mar. 1920, p. 4.
- "Hymn to the City." The Courier-Journal Junior, vol. 131, no. 18603, 7 Dec. 1919, p. 2.
- "Sonnet." The Courier-Journal Junior, vol. 132, no. 18904, 3 Oct. 1920, p. 4.
