= Lehigh Valley Association of Independent Colleges =

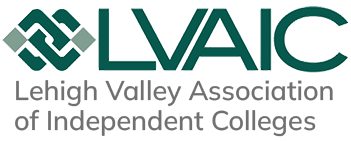
- Abbreviation: LVAIC
- Formation: 1969
- Type: Nonprofit
- Tax ID no.: 501(c)(3)
- Legal status: Tax-exempt nonprofit
- Purpose: Facilitate standardization and collaboration between colleges and universities in the Lehigh Valley
- Headquarters: 116 Research Drive
- Location: Bethlehem, Pennsylvania, U.S.
- Region served: Lehigh Valley
- Fields: Education
- Members: 6 (2024)
- Chairman: Dr. Kathleen E. Harring
- Board of directors: Treasurer Mark F. Reed; Assistant Treasurer Audra J. Kahr; Secretary Diane R. Dimitroff; Dr. Elizabeth M. Meade; Dr. Nicole Hurd; Dr Joseph J. Helble; Dr. Bryon L. Grigsby; Janet L. Baker
- Main organ: Audit Committee
- Affiliations: Pennsylvania Association of Nonprofit Organizations
- Revenue: $892,749 (2023)
- Expenses: $1,011,447 (2023)
- Funding: Contributions, Program Services
- Website: lvaic.org

The Lehigh Valley Association of Independent Colleges (LVAIC) is an academic consortium between six independent Colleges in the Lehigh Valley region of eastern Pennsylvania: Cedar Crest College, DeSales University, Lafayette College, Lehigh University, Moravian University, and Muhlenberg College.

== History ==
LVAIC was founded in 1969 following a meeting of the six presidents of its member institutions.

Moravian promotes LVAIC and its programs, mostly due to the school's close collaboration with Lehigh through the program. Due to the similarity of the school's schedules, and their close proximity, LVAIC allows many Moravian students to take classes at Lehigh that would otherwise be unavailable at Moravian.

In 1984, LVAIC created the Lehigh Valley Center for Jewish Studies to create a central Jewish studies institution to develop and administer courses across LVAIC member schools.

In 2011, LVAIC offered joint study abroad programs, sending students from various member schools to Italy as part of an Italian language class.

In 2012, LVAIC partnered with Lehigh university with a $275,000 grant from the U.S. Department of Commerce to support entrepreneurship in the Lehigh Valley.

In 2016, LVAIC's website was redesigned to better represent the LVAIC online, and make the website easier to use for students.

In 2017, LVAIC partnered with the Andrew W. Mellon Foundation to hold an art competition where students from the six member colleges could compete in an art consortium to "explore life" in the Lehigh Valley with a prize of $950,000. Lafayette would win the grant which would be used to build their William C. Buck Hall.

In 2019, LVAIC announced a minor in documentary story as a joint program between Lehigh University, Lafayette College, and Muhlenberg College, which would be cross listed with studies in American history, alongside German, Chinese, and English to promote a cross-disciplinary program. Additionally, the LVAIC announced a partnership with LANta to allow Lehigh and Lafayette students use their buses for free.

In 2020, during the height of the COVID-19 pandemic, LVAIC received criticism due to none of its member schools freezing tuition which became a standard practice for other schools in the northeast with some of the schools even increasing tuition instead.

In June 2024, LVAIC announced that they would be naming Janet Baker, the executive director of Institutional Effectiveness at Cedar Crest College, as their new executive director.

== Function ==
The core function of the LVAIC is to enable students from its member colleges to attend a course offered at another member college that isn't offered at their own. For example, Muhlenberg offers Italian language courses, but Moravian does not. A Moravian student can register with the LVAIC and take Muhlenberg’s Italian class while still being a full-time Moravian student. The LVAIC handles the registration and transfer of credits for no additional cost for the student, besides the cost of textbooks and supplies.

Each member college's president is a member of the LVAIC's board which promotes the colleges interacting and sharing resources with each other.

The LVAIC hosts the annual Bridging the Gap Student Leadership Conference which is supported by a Coalition of Diversity Administrators from the member schools. The Conference started life as an effort by the LVAIC to reduce The Rivalry tensions between students of color.

== Lehigh Valley Research Consortium ==
The LVAIC also organizes the subsidiary the Lehigh Valley Research Consortium (LVRC) which runs inter-collegiate research programs. The LVRC publishes a yearly State of the Lehigh Valley which studies the economic and cultural health of the valley.

In 2009, LVRC financed a study that highlight the increasing number of Hispanic students in the Lehigh Valley's primary and high-schools noting 22 percent of students enrolled in the Lehigh Valley were classified as Hispanic, compared to a statewide rate of 7 percent.

In 2013, LVRC filed a report that the Lehigh Valley was especially lagging in post great recession rebuilding and job growth noting a serious decline in individuals from the Valley seeking a higher education.

In 2014, LVRC filed a report that the Lehigh Valley had a higher proportion of STEM jobs, at 19% compared to the northeast's 16%, of the total workforce, and that many of these STEM jobs do not need a college degree.

In 2019, LVRC named Christine Carpino, an assistant professor of history, literature, and languages at Cedar Crest College as its director.

In 2022, LVRC worked with Lafayette College and Moravian University to research elder care solutions to develop strategies for a local retirement community.

== Membership ==
Institution	Location	Founded	Undergraduate enrollment	Endowment	Colors
Lehigh University	Bethlehem	1865	5,911	$2.20 billion	
Lafayette College	Easton	1826	2,729	$1.063 billion	
Cedar Crest College	Allentown	1867	953	$41.5 million	
Moravian University	Bethlehem	1863 (Note: Moravian University is the product of a 1954 merger of two separate seminaries, the all female Moravian Female Seminary which was founded in 1742, and Moravian College, often called Moravian College and Theological Seminary to prevent confusion, which was founded in 1807. However, both colleges started life as academies, and where only accredited as colleges in 1863.)	2,075	$177 million	
DeSales University	Upper Saucon Township	1964	2,398	$102.9 million	
Muhlenberg College	Allentown	1848	2,225	$308 million	

In addition to the six full time member institutions, a number of colleges are also associated with the LVAIC and some of its programs, including: (Note: The LVAIC does not openly report its associate schools due to varying degrees of association, providing numbers between 5 and 7 of them, however, these listed schools participate in the Steel Battalion, a pan-LVAIC ROTC program and represents the upper limit of associations.)

- Albright College
- Alvernia University
- Kutztown University of Pennsylvania
- Lehigh Carbon Community College
- Northampton Community College
- PennState Berks
- PennState Lehigh Valley
