= 1872 Georgia gubernatorial election =

- October 2, 1872
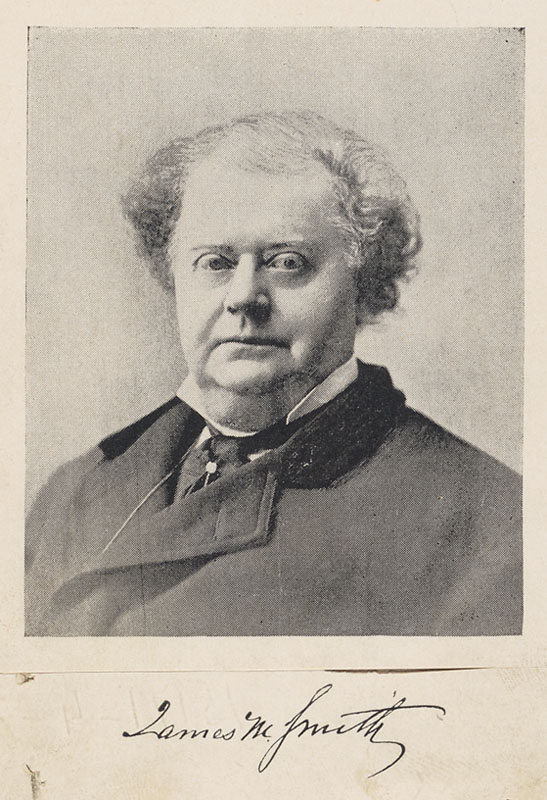

Nominee	James Milton Smith	Dawson A. Walker
Party	Democratic	Republican
Popular vote	104,256	45,812
Percentage	69.47%	30.53%
- Results by County: Smith: 50–60% 60–70% 70–80% 80–90% >90% Walker: 50–60% 60–70% 70–80% 80–90%
Governor before election
James Milton Smith
Democratic
Elected Governor
James Milton Smith
Democratic

The 1872 Georgia gubernatorial election was held on October 2, 1872, in order to elect the Governor of Georgia. Democratic nominee and incumbent Governor James Milton Smith defeated Republican nominee and former Justice of the Supreme Court of Georgia Dawson A. Walker.

== General election ==
On election day, October 2, 1872, Democratic nominee James Milton Smith won re-election by a margin of 58,444 votes against his opponent Republican nominee Dawson A. Walker, thereby holding Democratic control over the office of Governor. Smith was sworn in for his first full term on January 12, 1873.

=== Results ===
Georgia gubernatorial election, 1872
Party	Candidate	Votes	%
Democratic	James Milton Smith (incumbent)	104,256	69.47
Republican	Dawson A. Walker	45,812	30.53
Total votes		150,068	100.00
Democratic hold			
