= Poskanzer =

Poskanzer is a surname. Notable people with the surname include:

- Arthur M. Poskanzer (1931–2021), American physicist
- Jef Poskanzer (fl. 1993), American computer programmer
- Steven Poskanzer (fl. 2001), American university administrator
