= Wendy Raymond =

American college president

President of Haverford College
- Incumbent
- Assumed office July 1, 2019
- Preceded by: Kim Benston

Personal details
- Education: Cornell University (BA); Harvard University (PhD)

Wendy Raymond is an American biochemist and molecular biologist serving since 2019 as the 16th President of Haverford College. She was formerly Vice President for Academic Affairs/Dean of Faculty and a professor of biology at Davidson College. Her research focus is molecular genetics.

== Biography ==
Raymond is from Mequon, Wisconsin. In 1982 she earned an undergraduate degree from Cornell University, where she was elected to Phi Beta Kappa. In 1990 she received a Ph.D. in biochemistry and molecular biology from Harvard University.

=== Early career ===
After an American Cancer Society post-doctoral fellowship at the University of Washington, in 1994 Raymond became a professor of biology at Williams College, where she was later named Associate Dean for Institutional Diversity.

She became provost of Davidson College in 2013 and, in 2014, was appointed chair of the National Science Foundation's Committee on Equal Opportunities in Science and Engineering. She is also a member of the Executive Committee of the organization of Liberal Arts Diversity Officers.

=== Haverford College ===
In December 2018, Haverford College named Raymond as its 16th president. She took office on July 1, 2019.

On May 7, 2025, testifying at a hearing of the United States House Committee on Education and Workforce, Raymond was asked about her handling of antisemitism on campus, and was criticized in part because she repeatedly refused to answer questions about aggregate statistics on students the college had suspended or otherwise disciplined for antisemitic conduct. As a result, Representative Ryan Mackenzie of Pennsylvania threatened to withdraw federal funding from the college.

On November 20, 2025, Raymond announced her plan to retire from Haverford College, effective June 2027.
