= Robert A. Oden =

Robert Oden

10th President of Carleton College
- In office 2002–2010
- Preceded by: Stephen Lewis
- Succeeded by: Steven G. Poskanzer

22nd President of Kenyon College
- In office 1995–2002
- Preceded by: Philip H. Jordan
- Succeeded by: S. Georgia Nugent

Personal details
- Born: September 11, 1946 (age 80) Vermillion, South Dakota, United States
- Education: Harvard University; Cambridge University

Robert Allen Oden Jr. (/ˈoʊdin/; born September 11, 1946) is a former professor and college administrator. He was the president of Kenyon College from 1995 to 2002 and president of Carleton College from 2002 to 2010. He was also a significant professor in the early years of The Teaching Company, contributing several courses—God and Mankind: Comparative Religions, The Christian Religions and Religious Fundamentalism, and The Old Testament: An Introduction (2nd Edition)—as well as recruiting professors for the series Great World Religions (1st Edition).

== Biography ==
Oden was born in Vermillion, South Dakota. He graduated magna cum laude and Phi Beta Kappa from Harvard University. He then earned a second bachelor's degree and a master's from Cambridge University (where he was a Marshall Scholar) and a master's in theology and a Ph.D. in near Eastern languages and literatures from Harvard. He served on the faculty of Dartmouth College as a professor of religion from 1972 to 1989, where he was the first recipient of Dartmouth's Distinguished Teaching Prize.

Oden then served in administrative positions, first as headmaster of The Hotchkiss School in Lakeville, Connecticut from 1989 to 1995, and afterwards as president of Kenyon College from 1995 to 2002, when he accepted the presidency at Carleton College. While president he held a faculty appointment in the religion department at Carleton, and regularly taught a fly-fishing course at the college. He said of his decision to come to Carleton, referring to his childhood just across the border from Minnesota: "Perhaps all Americans have come to know parts of this great country in which we feel special comfort and a sense of being at home; it is this that has meant for [me and my wife] Carleton College's special appeal.

Oden is a recreational runner who used the trails of Northfield's Cowling Arboretum, and is a fly-fisherman.

After retiring from Carleton, Oden moved to Hanover, New Hampshire, where he served as chair of the Dartmouth-Hitchcock Medical Center board of trustees.
