= Alison Byerly =

American academic and university administrator

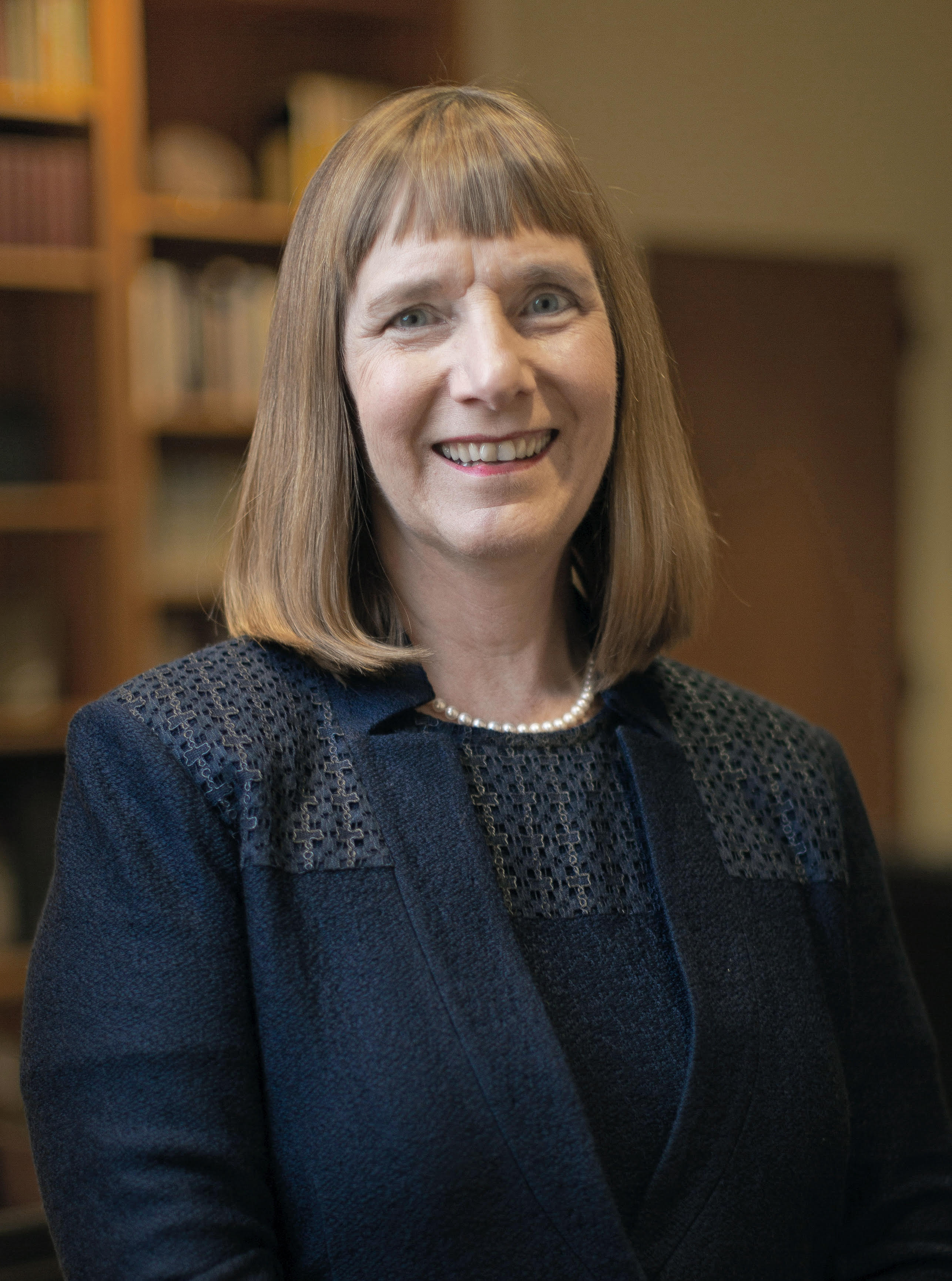
- Byerly in 2019

12th President of Carleton College
- Incumbent
- Assumed office August 1, 2021
- Preceded by: Steven G. Poskanzer

17th President of Lafayette College
- In office July 1, 2013 – July 1, 2021
- Preceded by: Daniel Weiss
- Succeeded by: Nicole Hurd

Personal details
- Born: 1961 (age 63–64)
- Spouse: Stephen Jensen
- Children: 1 daughter and son
- Education: Wellesley College (BA); University of Pennsylvania (MA, PhD)
- Website: Office of the President

Alison R. Byerly (born 1961) is an American academic, who is serving as the 12th president of Carleton College in Northfield, Minnesota. She was previously the 17th president of Lafayette College in Easton, Pennsylvania.

== Early life and education ==
Byerly was born in Glenside, Pennsylvania, in Montgomery County in 1961. She earned a Bachelor of Arts degree with honors in English at Wellesley College in 1983, a Master of Arts in English at the University of Pennsylvania in 1984, and a PhD in English from the university in 1989.

== Career ==
Byerly's area of specialty is the intersection of literature and other media, with research focus on Victorian literature, culture, and media; digital humanities; technology and the liberal arts.

Byerly was at Middlebury College in Vermont from 1989, serving as provost and executive Vice President from 2007 to 2012. She has been a visiting scholar at Massachusetts Institute of Technology, Stanford University, and Oxford University.

Byerly became president of Lafayette College in 2013, and in 2016 launched a 10-year plan to increase the student body by 16 percent, more than double the financial aid budget, and create 40 new faculty positions with a goal of allowing Lafayette to admit more students without regard for their ability to pay. By 2019, the aid budget had grown by 30 percent, the student body by 100 students, and the faculty by 11 positions. Under Byerly's leadership, Lafayette also launched and completed its largest-ever fund-raising effort, and opened its largest capital project ever, the Rockwell Integrated Sciences Center. On October 6, 2020, she announced her decision to retire at Lafayette effective the end of the school year.

In August 2021, Byerly became president of Carleton College.

== Personal life ==
Byerly is married to Stephen Jensen, a medical editor. They have a daughter and a son.

She is known to students at both Carleton and Lafayette Colleges as "Ally B."

== Published works ==
She has written Realism, Representation, and the Arts in Nineteenth-Century Literature (Cambridge, 1998), and Are We There Yet? Virtual Travel and Victorian Realism (U of Michigan, 2012).

Academic offices
Preceded by Daniel Weiss	17th President of Lafayette College; 1 July 2013 – 1 July 2021	Succeeded by Nicole Hurd
