= Henry Kent McCay =

American judge

Judge of the United States District Court for the Northern District of Georgia
- In office August 4, 1882 – July 30, 1886
- Appointed by: Chester A. Arthur
- Preceded by: Seat established by 22 Stat. 47
- Succeeded by: William Truslow Newman

Personal details
- Born: Henry Kent McCay; January 8, 1820 Northumberland County, Pennsylvania
- Died: July 30, 1886 (aged 66) Atlanta, Georgia
- Education: Princeton University (AB) read law

Henry Kent McCay (January 8, 1820 – July 30, 1886) was a lawyer, a Confederate States Army and Georgia militia officer, an associate justice of the Georgia Supreme Court, and a United States district judge of the United States District Court for the Northern District of Georgia.

== Education and career ==
Born in Northumberland County, Pennsylvania, on January 8, 1820, McCay was the son of Robert and Sarah (Read) McCay. McCay received an Artium Baccalaureus degree from Princeton University in 1839. He then moved to Georgia where his brother, Charles F. McCay, was a professor at the University of Georgia in Athens. He read law under Georgia Chief Justice Joseph Henry Lumpkin and was admitted to the bar in 1842. He was in private practice in Americus, Georgia from 1843 to 1861. Before the American Civil War, McCay opposed secession but when Georgia seceded, he joined the 12th Georgia Infantry Regiment. During the American Civil War, McCay was a lieutenant and captain in the Confederate States Army from June 15, 1861 to March 14, 1863, when he resigned. He was wounded at the Battle of Allegheny Mountain, Virginia, December 13, 1861. McCay served as a brigadier general in the Georgia militia in 1864 and fought at the battles of Griswoldville and Altamaha Bridge. After the war, McCay returned to private practice of law in Americus from 1865 to 1868. He was a justice of the Supreme Court of Georgia from 1868 to 1875, again returning to private practice in Atlanta, Georgia from 1875 to 1882.

== Federal judicial service ==
McCay was nominated by President Chester A. Arthur on August 3, 1882, to the United States District Court for the Northern District of Georgia, to a new seat authorized by 22 Stat. 47. He was confirmed by the United States Senate on August 4, 1882, and received his commission the same day. His service terminated on July 30, 1886, due to his death in Atlanta. McCay is buried in Oakland Cemetery in Atlanta.

== See also ==
- List of American Civil War generals (Acting Confederate)

== Sources ==
- Allardice, Bruce S. More Generals in Gray. Baton Rouge: Louisiana State University Press, 1995. ISBN 978-0-8071-3148-0.

Legal offices
Preceded by Seat established by 22 Stat. 47	Judge of the United States District Court for the Northern District of Georgia; 1882–1886	Succeeded by William Truslow Newman
Political offices
Preceded by Dawson A. Walker	Justice of the Supreme Court of Georgia; 1868–1875	Succeeded by Logan Edwin Bleckley
