= Doctortown, Georgia =

Ghost town in Wayne County, Georgia

Coordinates: 31°39′13″N 81°49′45″W

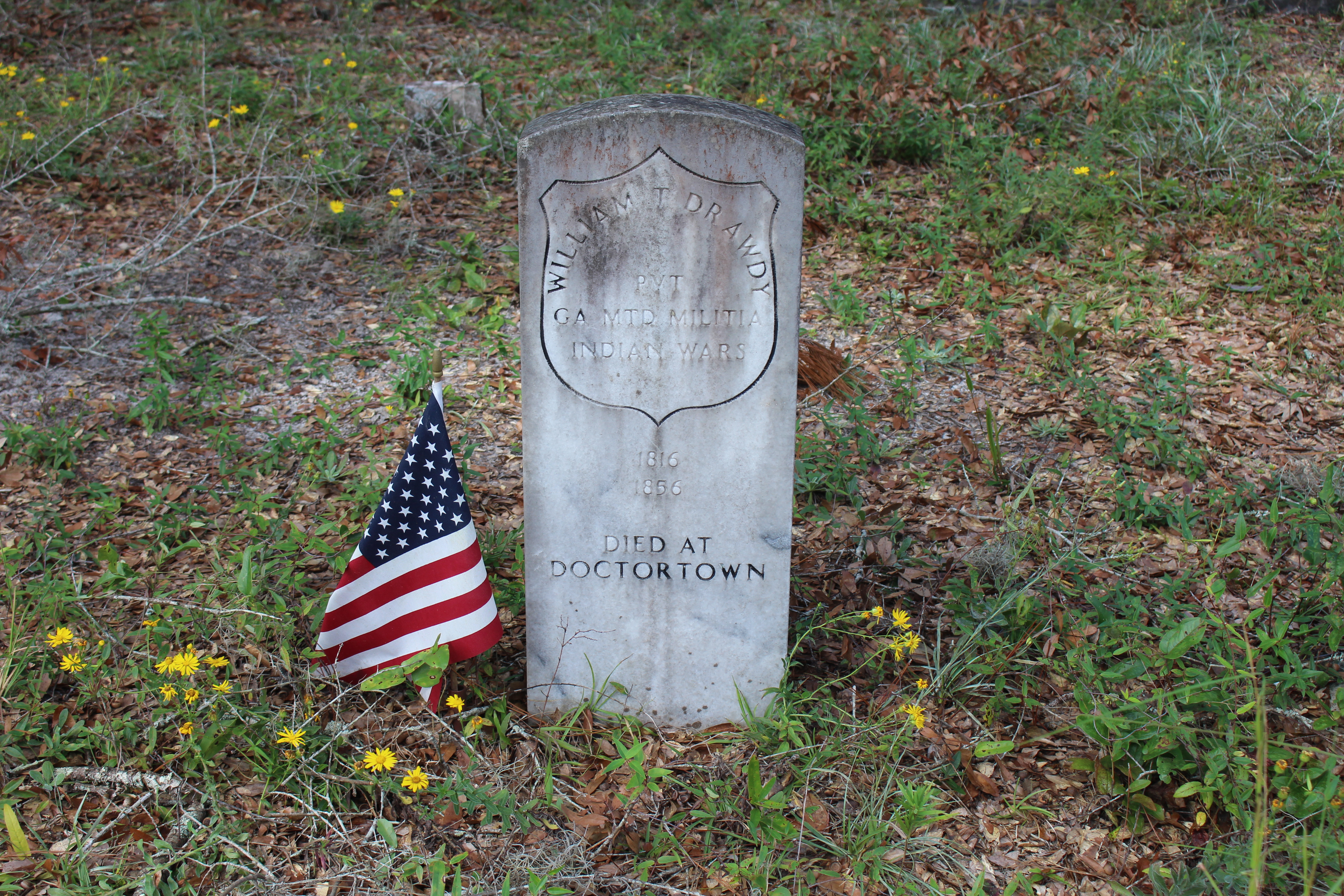
Grave still visible at Doctortown

Doctortown is a ghost town in Wayne County, Georgia. The GNIS classifies it as a populated place.

== History ==
The first white settlement at Doctortown was made in 1827, at the site where a Native American village once stood. A post office was established at Doctortown in 1857, and remained in operation until 1967. The community was named for the fact a medicine man once had lived near the original town site.

== See also ==
- Battle of Altamaha Bridge
