= Lafayette College =

Private college in Easton, Pennsylvania, US

- Motto: Veritas liberabit (Latin) Cur Non? (Latin)
- Motto in English: The truth shall set you free. Why Not?
- Type: Private liberal arts college
- Established: 1826; 200 years ago
- Academic affiliations: NAICU; CIC; LVAIC; Annapolis Group; CLAC; Oberlin Group
- Endowment: $1.2 billion (2025)
- President: Nicole Hurd
- Provost: Laura E. McGrane
- Faculty: 276 full-time members
- Undergraduates: 2,675 (fall 2025)
- Location: Easton, Pennsylvania, U.S. 40°41′55″N 75°12′29″W
- Campus: Suburban 110-acre (45 ha) main campus and additional 230-acre (93 ha) athletic complex.
- Colors: Maroon and white
- Nickname: Leopards
- Sporting affiliations: NCAA Division I – Patriot League
- Website: www.lafayette.edu
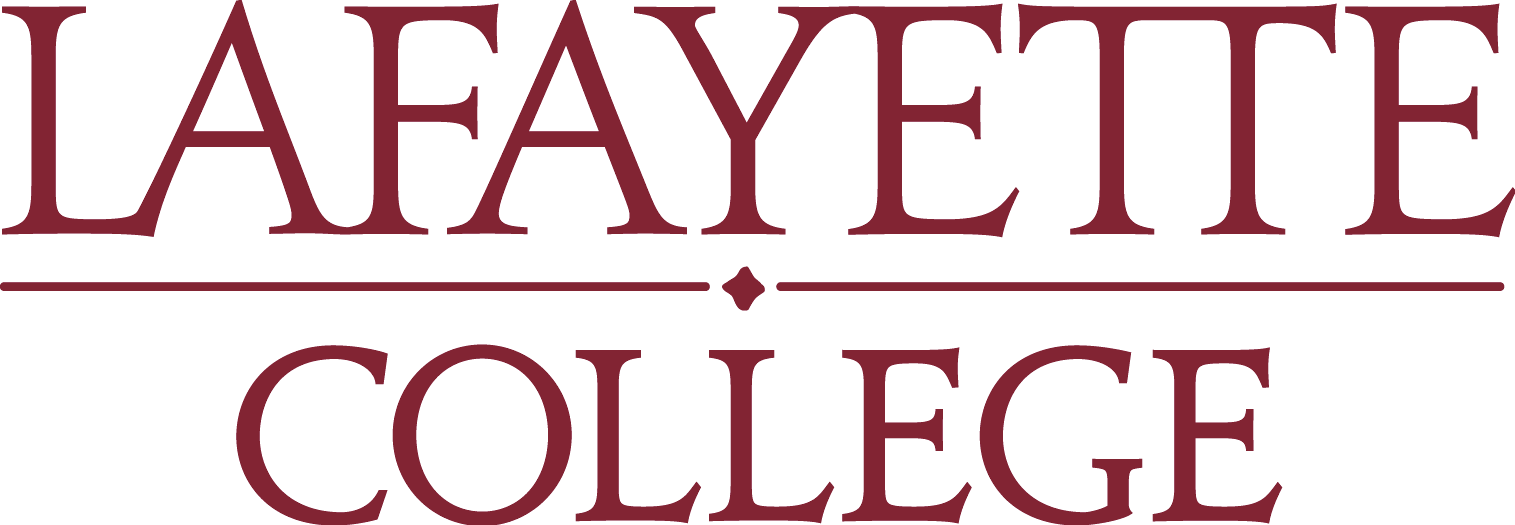

Lafayette College is a private liberal arts college in Easton, Pennsylvania, United States. Founded in 1826 by James Madison Porter and other citizens in Easton, the college first held classes in 1832. The founders voted to name the college after the Marquis de Lafayette, a hero of the American Revolution.

Located on College Hill in Easton, the campus overlooks the Delaware River and is situated in the Lehigh Valley, about 70 mi (110 km) west of New York City and 60 mi (97 km) north of Philadelphia. Lafayette enrolls approximately 2,700 undergraduate students and offers programs in the humanities, social sciences, natural sciences, and engineering. The college emphasizes small class sizes and undergraduate research, and it competes in NCAA Division I athletics as a member of the Patriot League. As of 2024, its endowment was valued at over $1 billion.

== History ==
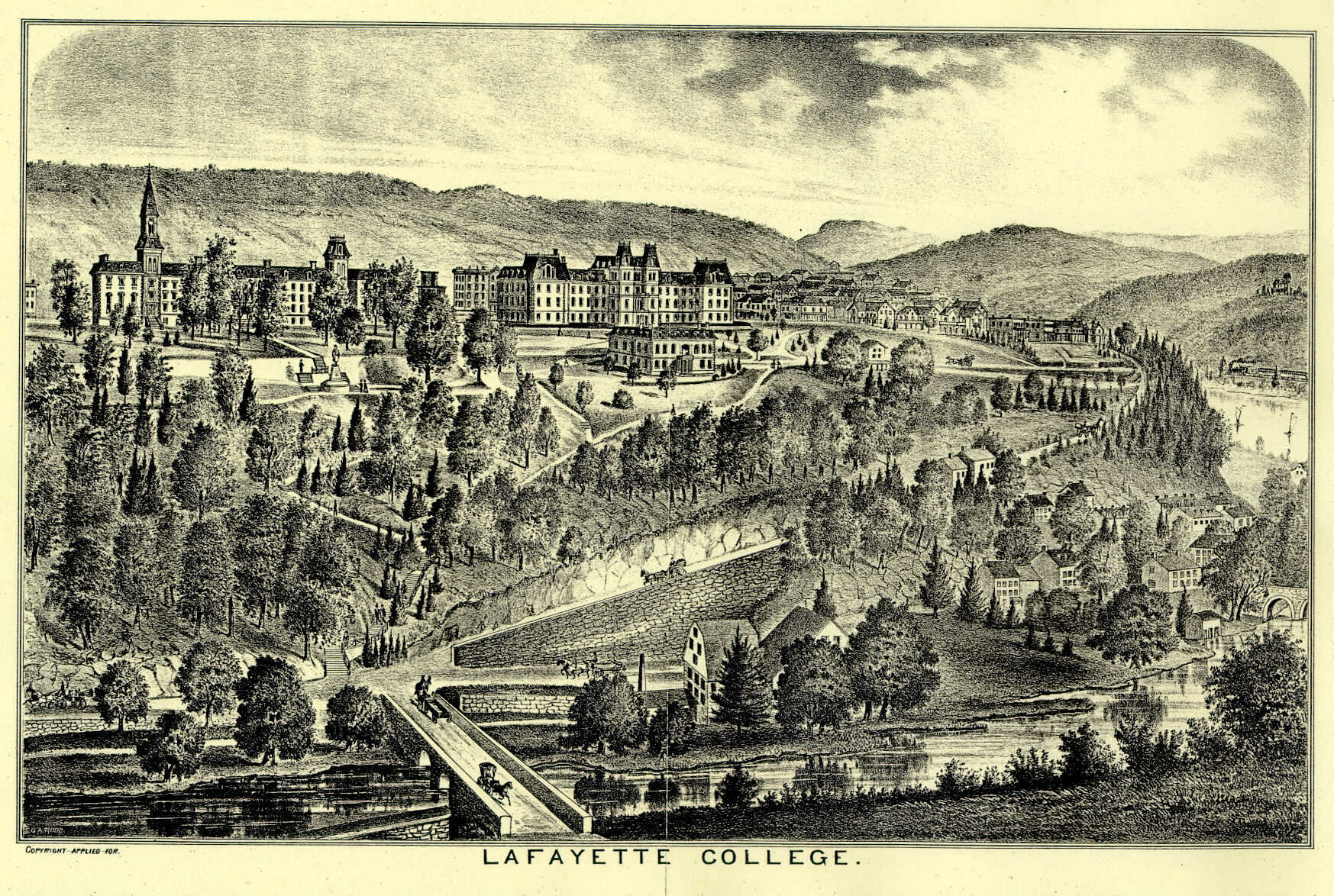
A lithograph of Lafayette College, c. 1875

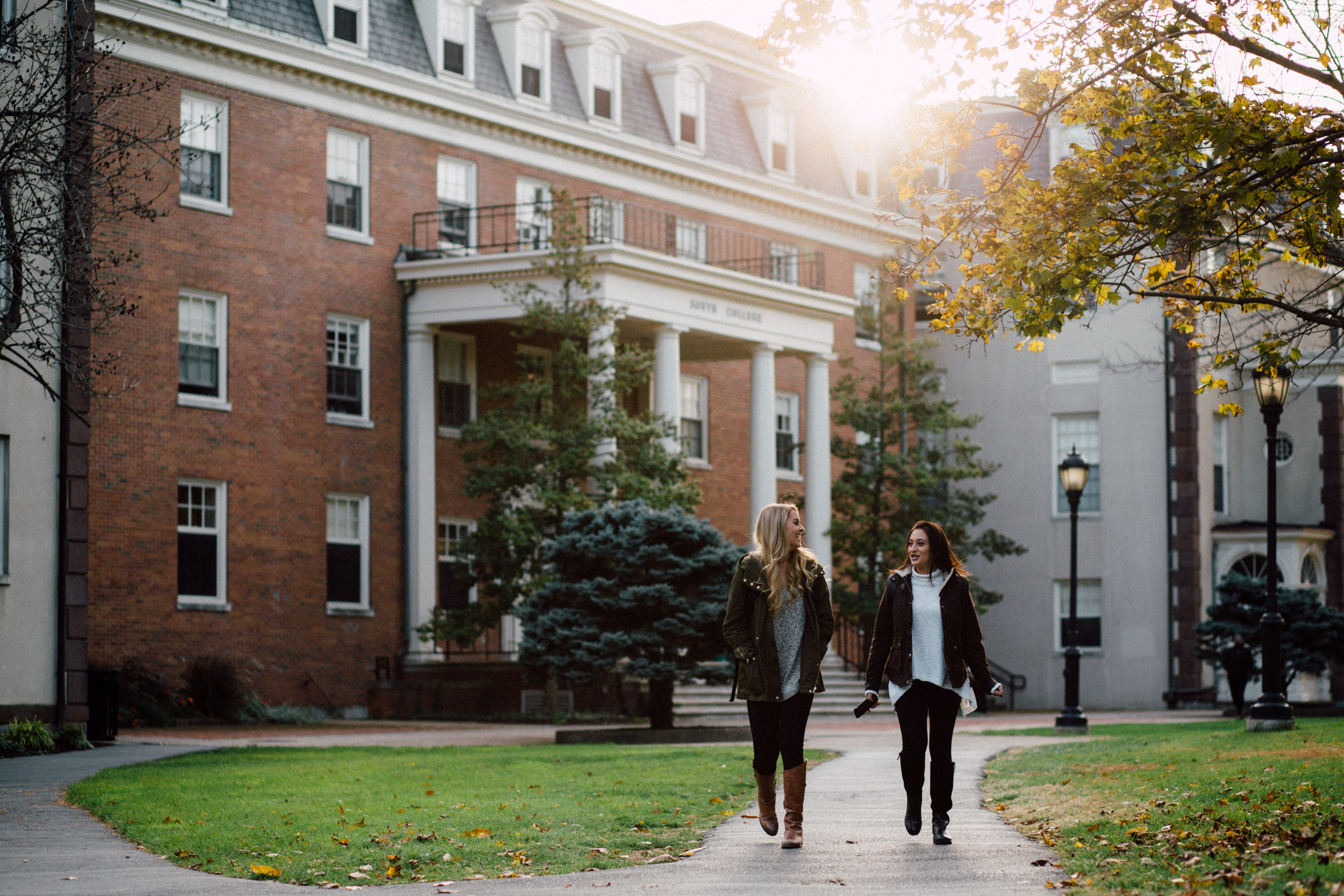
South College, one of Lafayette's largest residence halls, housing approximately 220 students in a coeducational setting

A group of Easton residents, led by James Madison Porter, son of General Andrew Porter of Norristown, Pennsylvania, met on December 27, 1824, at White's Tavern to discuss founding a college in town. The recent visit of General Lafayette to New York during his grand tour of the U.S. in 1824 and 1825 prompted the founders to name the college after the renowned French military officer, a hero of the American Revolutionary War, as "a testimony of respect for [his] talents, virtues, and signal services... in the great cause of freedom".

The group established a 35-member board of trustees, a system of governance that continues at the college to the present. They selected Porter, lawyer Jacob Wagener, and Yale-educated lawyer Joel Jones to come up with an education plan. The charter gained state approval from the legislature and, on March 9, 1826, Pennsylvania Governor John Andrew Shulze. Along with establishing Lafayette as a liberal arts college, the charter provided for religious equality among professors, students, and staff.

The board of trustees met on May 15, 1826, for the election of officers: Thomas McKeen as Treasurer, Joel Jones as Secretary, and James Madison Porter as the first president of the college. Over the next few years, the board met several times to discuss property and funding for the college's start-up. Six years after the first meeting, Lafayette began to enroll students.

The college opened on May 1, 1829, with four students under the guidance of John Monteith. At the start of the next year, George Junkin, a Presbyterian minister, was elected first official president of the college. He moved the all-male Manual Labor Academy of Pennsylvania from Germantown (near Philadelphia) to Easton to assist with the physical construction of the college's first building. Its first two professors were Charles F. McCay and James I. Coon. Classes began on May 9, 1832, with instruction of 43 students in a rented farmhouse on the south bank of the Lehigh River. Junkin supported colonization of Liberia by ex-slaves from the United States. He proposed Lafayette for educating free African Americans for missionary work in the new American colony established by the American Colonization Society. Between 1832 and 1844, ten black students were enrolled at Lafayette, four of whom later served as missionaries in Liberia.

During the college's first years, students were required to work in the fields and workshops to allow the college to earn money to support its programs. This manual labor was retained as part of the curriculum until 1839, as the college was focused on preparing students for Military and Civil Engineering. Later that year, Lafayette purchased property on what is now known as "College Hill" – nine acres of elevated land across Bushkill Creek. The college's first building was constructed two years later on the current site of South College.

A dispute, largely related to the financial well-being of the school, between Porter and Junkin led to the latter man's resignation from the presidency in 1841. The next decade was fraught with financial difficulties and a rotation of four new presidents of the college, including the return of Junkin for a brief period. In an effort to restore financial order to the institution, the trustees explored the potential of adding a religious affiliation.

In 1849, Lafayette College became affiliated with the Presbyterian Church via the Synod of Philadelphia. By relinquishing their control, the college was able to collect $1000 a year from the Presbyterian Church Board of Education as regularly as the latter could pay it. In the time from 1855 to 1856, Lafayette had a peak enrollment of 112 students in total. The class of 1857, a close-knit group of 27 men, worked in secrecy to establish charters in national fraternities, thus founding the first Greek-letter fraternities at Lafayette College. These fraternities remained secret until 1869, as they were initially discouraged by the college authorities.

=== World War I ===
In preparation for United States entry into the World War I, which had involved European nations since 1914, Lafayette announced that current students would be awarded their degrees in absentia if they enlisted or went to work on farms to support the war effort. Professor Beverly Kunkel organized The Lafayette Ambulance United, Section 61, United States Army Ambulance Corps. During the summer of 1917, MacCracken arranged to adapt the campus as a war camp for the War Department. Lafayette remained a war camp until January 2, 1919, when the regular course of study was re-established there.

On December 16, 1925, the nation's largest fraternity, Alpha Phi Omega, was founded at Lafayette.

=== Great Depression ===
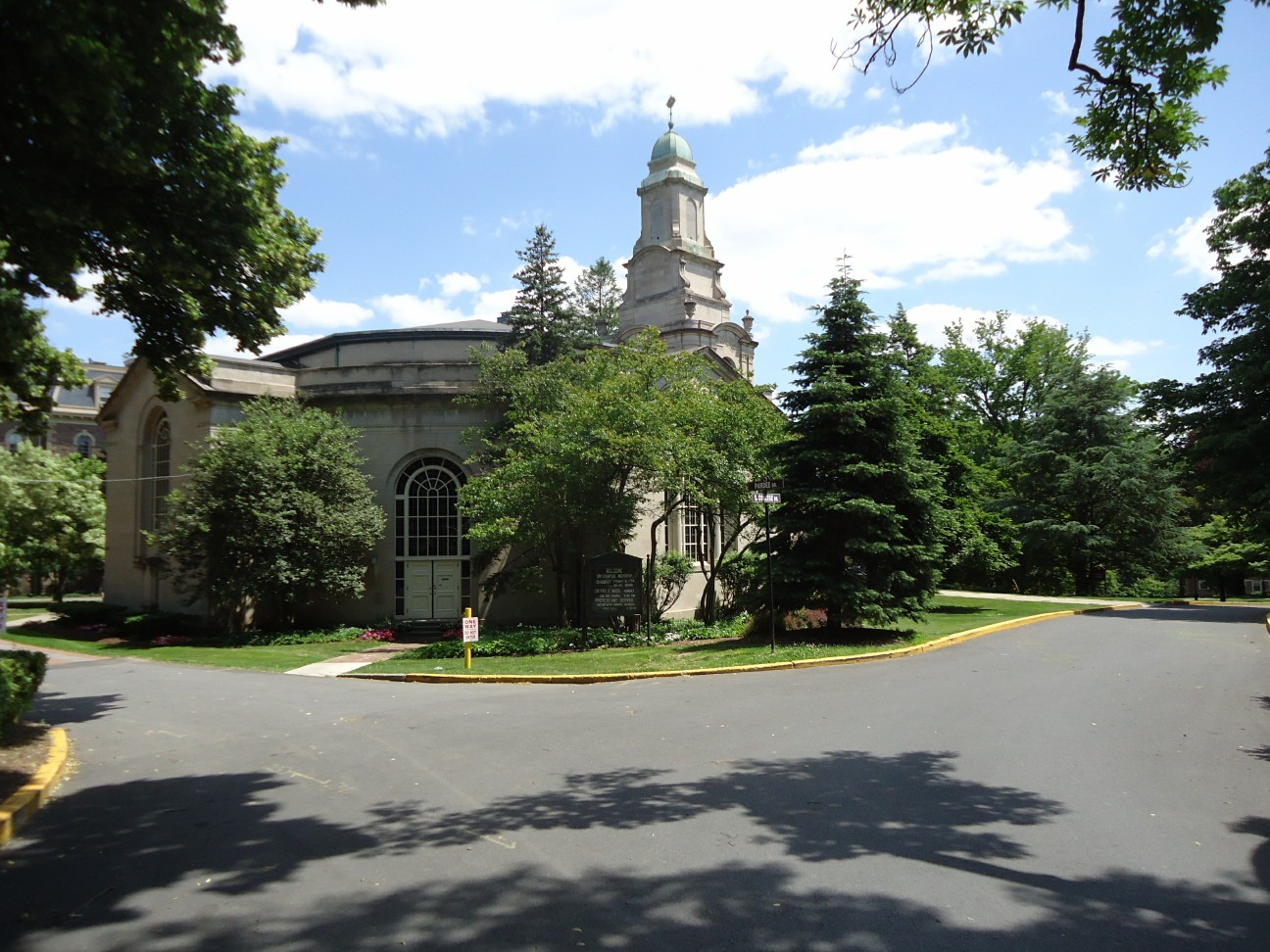
Colton Chapel

Between 1930 and 1934, during the Great Depression, the number of students declined dramatically. The college created new scholarships and scholarship loans to enable more students to attend. It also founded an Engineering Guidance Conference for boys. The conference was two weeks long and introduced twenty-one high school students to the concepts of engineering. This program continued until the outbreak of World War II in 1941. Though the college faced its own deficits during the Depression, it aided the larger community by offering a series of free classes to unemployed men, beginning in 1932. They also made athletic facilities available for free to unemployed members of the community. Enrollment began to rise again for the 1935–1936 academic year.

=== Decade of Progress campaign ===
As the college moved out of the Great Depression, the college's new president, William Mather Lewis, began what was called the Decade of Progress capital campaign, in order to fund delayed improvements. It started as a celebration of the 70th anniversary of Lafayette's engineering program. President Lewis regarded this 70-year span as a period which "covers the great development in American engineering which has now seemed to reach its peak." The goal of this campaign was to raise $500,000 for payments on Gates Hall, renovation of Van Wickle Memorial Library, and equipment upgrades in other departments. By the time the campaign closed in 1944, the college had received a total amount of $280,853.34.

=== World War II ===
Initially, most of the faculty and students at Lafayette wanted the U.S. to stay out of the conflict in Europe. When President Franklin D. Roosevelt addressed the Pan-American Congress, saying that the US had a duty to protect Americans' science, culture, freedom and civilization, thirty-seven Lafayette faculty members wired the president objecting to his speech. After the Japanese attack on Pearl Harbor and declaration of war by the US, the Northampton County Council of Defense organized a College Council of Defense at Lafayette. The college took official action as well. It bolstered its ROTC program and improved facilities to prepare for air raid tests. The college continued its academic programs until the US lowered the draft age from 20 to 18 in November 1942.

While more students enlisted, Lafayette College was one of 36 academic institutions selected by the United States Department of War to train engineering and aviation cadets. After the war, the Serviceman's Readjustment Act of 1944 (known as the GI Bill) resulted in a new wave of enrollment at Lafayette by veterans and by 1949 the college had approximately 2000 students.

=== Coeducational institution ===
In 1967, in consideration of cultural changes that included women seeking more participation in society, faculty requested that a special committee be formed to discuss making Lafayette a co-educational institution. That committee issued a formal recommendation the following year. In September 1970, Lafayette College welcomed its first official coeducational class with 146 women (123 freshmen, and 23 transfers).

=== 21st century ===
In 2004, a report on religious life at Lafayette College was compiled, recommending a review of the college's formal relationship with the Presbyterian church. The college has retained its affiliation, although it is not a member of the Association of Presbyterian Colleges and Universities.

In 2007, the college commemorated the 250th birthday of General Lafayette through a series of lectures and campus dedications. Major festivities were held on September 6, 2007, Lafayette's birthday. They were started the night before with a lecture by the historian David McCullough.

In October of 2011 former President of the Soviet Union, Mikhail Gorbachev spoke at Lafayette to an audience of over 3000 people.

On January 16, 2013, Alison Byerly was announced as Lafayette's 17th and first female president. She took office on July 1, 2013, replacing outgoing president Daniel Weiss. She was formerly a professor at Middlebury College. Under Byerly's administration, the college began to undertake plans for expansion of the student body to 2,900 students and the construction of new dorms and academic buildings, with the stated goal of raising funds for financial aid. The campaign was the most successful fundraising campaign in college history and resulted in the renovation of multiple campus landmarks and one new building for the study of global education.

Nicole Hurd, the founder of the College Advising Corps, was announced as Byerly's successor as president on May 15, 2021. In January 2025, she became the first president in the college's history to lose a faculty-led no-confidence vote.

Lafayette was selected as the site of the 2024 vice presidential debate, though the Commission on Presidential Debates (CPD) canceled the event after President Joe Biden's campaign refused to participate in CPD-sponsored debates.

== Academics ==
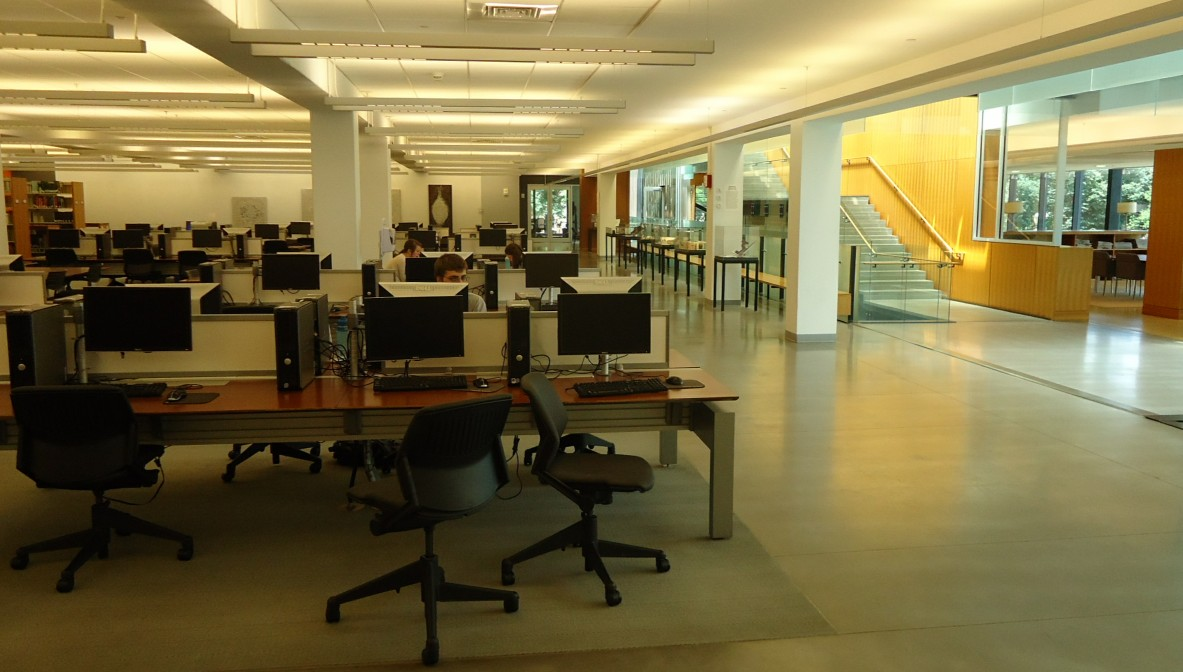
Skillman Library Computer Lab

Lafayette College offers a Bachelor of Arts (B.A.) and Bachelor of Science (B.S.) degrees. Its most popular majors, by 2021 graduates, were:

Economics (81)
Mechanical Engineering (60)
Neuroscience (39)
Political Science & Government (38)
Chemical Engineering (35)
Psychology (34)
Civil Engineering (32)
International Relations & Affairs (32)

Academic rankings

Liberal arts
- U.S. News & World Report: 30
- Washington Monthly: 21

National
- Forbes: 91
- WSJ/College Pulse: 56

Lafayette's team was undefeated in the academic College Bowl in 1962, retiring after beating the University of California, Berkeley for its fifth victory.

The college also offers merit-based academic scholarships: the Marquis Fellowship, a full-tuition scholarship, and the Marquis Scholarship, a half-tuition scholarship. As of 2021, Lafayette's endowment was more than $1.063 billion.

== Admissions ==
Lafayette uses the Common Application as the sole method for students to the apply to the school. Applicants may apply through early decision I or II for an earlier response, or through regular decision. For the class of 2029, the college received 10,547 applications, of which 3,108 were accepted, for an acceptance rate of 29.46%.

For the 2024–2025 academic year, the total cost of attendance at Lafayette's was $83,652, placing it among the most expensive private colleges by published cost. In 2022, Lafayette introduced a no-loan financial aid initiative for domestic students from families earning up to $150,000, replacing loans with grants and work-study; the program expanded in 2024 to include families earning up to $200,000.

Merit-based scholarships are available for some students, including the full-tuition Marquis Fellowship and the half-tuition Marquis Scholarship. The college also partners with the Posse Foundation to recruit students from the New York and Washington metropolitan areas, providing them with full-tuition scholarships.

== Campus ==
Lafayette College occupies College Hill in Easton, Pennsylvania, located in the Lehigh Valley. It is about 70 mi (110 km) west of New York City and 60 mi (97 km) north of Philadelphia. Its 340-acre campus houses 69 buildings, comprising approximately 1.76 million square feet. This includes a 230-acre athletic campus. Lafayette's campus buildings range in architectural style from Pardee Hall's Second Empire design and Hogg Hall's Collegiate Gothic, to the late modern architecture of the Williams Center for the Arts, the William E. and Carol G. Simon Wing of Skillman Library, and the Farinon College Center.

=== Academic facilities ===
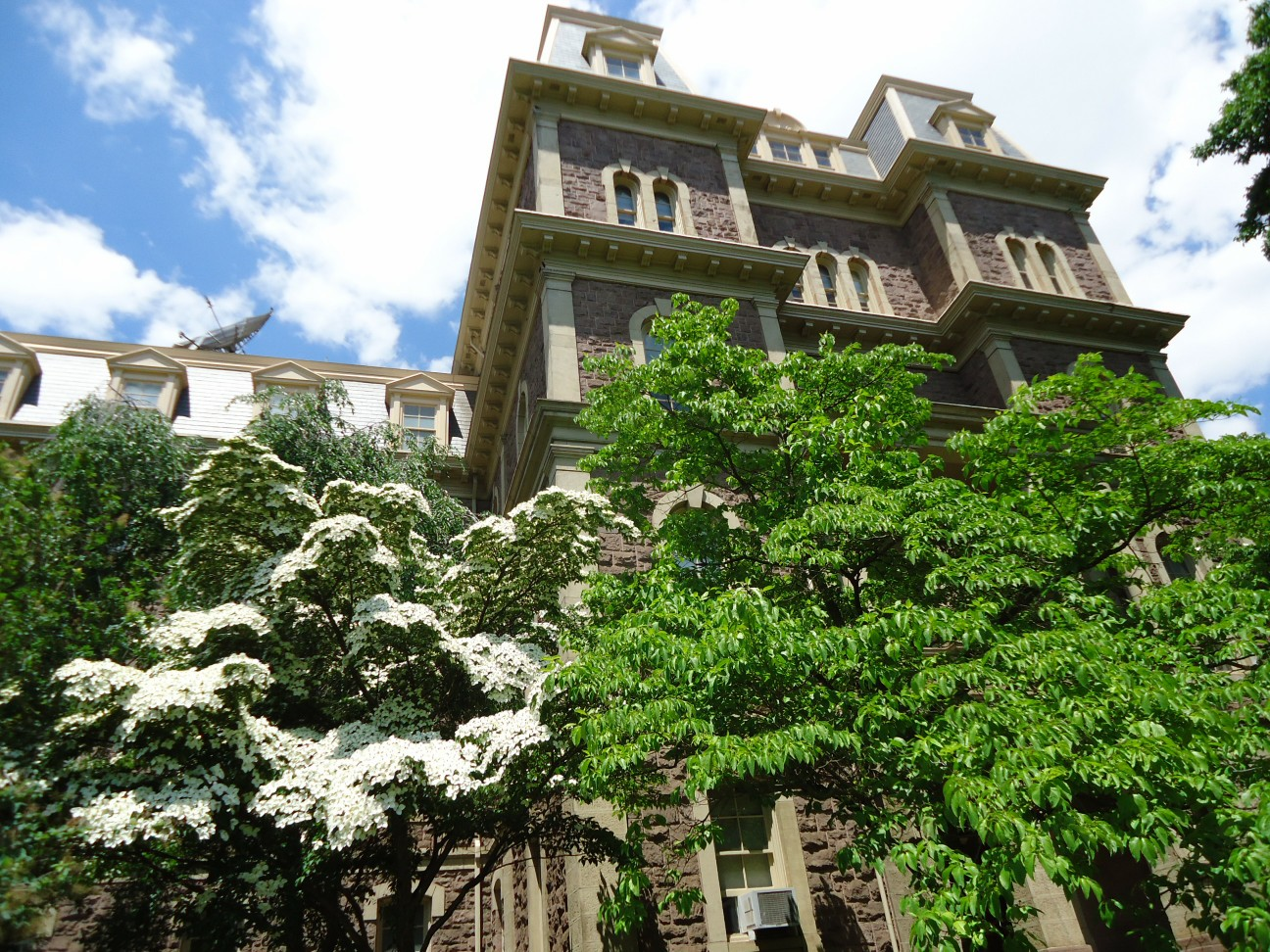
Pardee Hall on the Lafayette campus

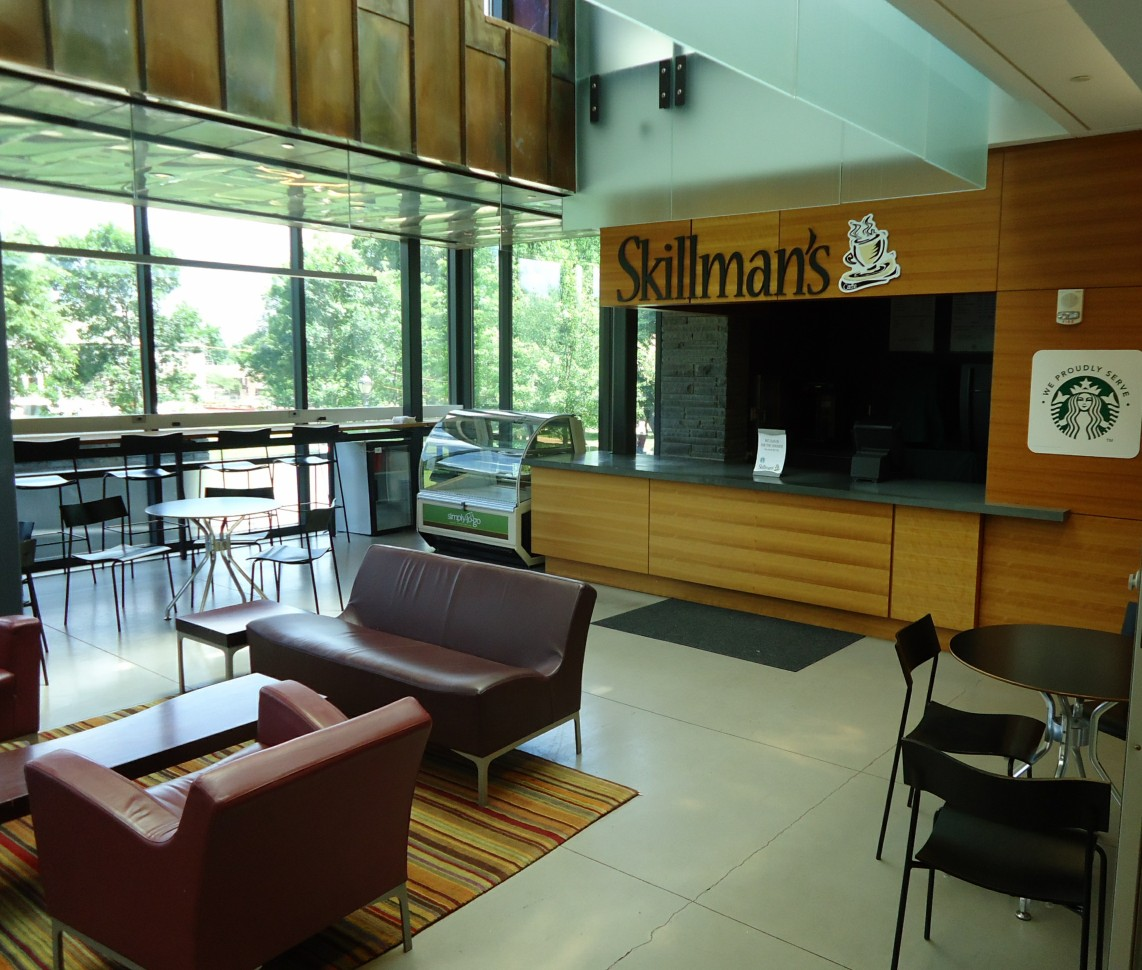
A coffee area within Skillman Library

Williams Center for the Arts is the college's performing arts center. Completed in 1983, the building houses the Performance Series, the Williams Art Gallery and College Collections, the departments of Art and Music, and the student-led Arts Society. The centerpiece of the Williams Center is the 400-seat theater/concert hall and also contains a versatile art gallery, recording studio, piano lab, practice rooms, and classrooms for music and art.

Pardee Hall, funded by Ario Pardee and completed in 1873, is one of the earliest buildings constructed at Lafayette College. When initially constructed, it was one of the largest academic buildings of its era. Pardee was designed to hold all of the science programs. Today it is used for a wide range of departments including languages and women and gender studies.

The Kirby Hall of Civil Rights was constructed in the late 1920s between World War I and the Great Depression. The cost of the building was donated by Kirby. The design was "rumored to be per square foot the most expensive building of its day." Lafayette selected the architectural firm Warren and Wetmore, known for their projects of designing the New York Yacht Club, the New York Biltmore Hotel, and Grand Central Station. The building's exterior embraces styles of Republic Rome, the Renaissance, 17th English classicism, and Beaux-Arts. The interior lobby area contains broad staircases and is constructed of travertine marble. The building currently houses the Government & Law department. Students have access to the Kirby Library, which has 20-foot ceilings and oak-paneled book cases.

Markle Hall, now the main administrative building, holding Offices of Admissions and Financial Aid, was designed as the Hall of Mining Engineering. The college's Special Collections maintains an online historical overview of all the campus buildings.

The David Bishop Skillman library, built in 1961, is the main library on campus; the Simon Wing was added in 1986, and a $22 million renovation and expansion was completed in 2004. The library contains over 500,000 volumes in its collections and subscribes to thousands of magazines, journals, and newspapers in the electronic and paper format. In addition, the college's Special Collections and College Archives holds materials and displays holdings related to the Marquis de Lafayette. Reading and study areas and computer labs are available to the students.

==== East Asia Image Collection ====
The East Asia Image Collection (EAIC) is an open-access digital repository of images from all areas of the history of the Empire of Japan. It is curated by the Digital Scholarship Services of Lafayette College. Rare materials include prewar picture postcards, high-quality commercial prints, and colonial era picture books.

=== Housing and student life facilities ===
Lafayette College guarantees campus housing to all enrolled students and requires them to live on campus unless approved as commuters or released seniors. On-campus housing options include traditional communal living halls, suite-style buildings, apartments, and Greek chapter houses. Some dormitories are single gender, while others are co-ed by floor, wing, room, or suite. Themed housing includes communities focused on international students, wellness, academic exploration, LGBTQ+ identity, tabletop gaming, music, and the arts. The college also offers a residence for Jewish life and for students from underrepresented racial and ethnic backgrounds.

== Athletics ==
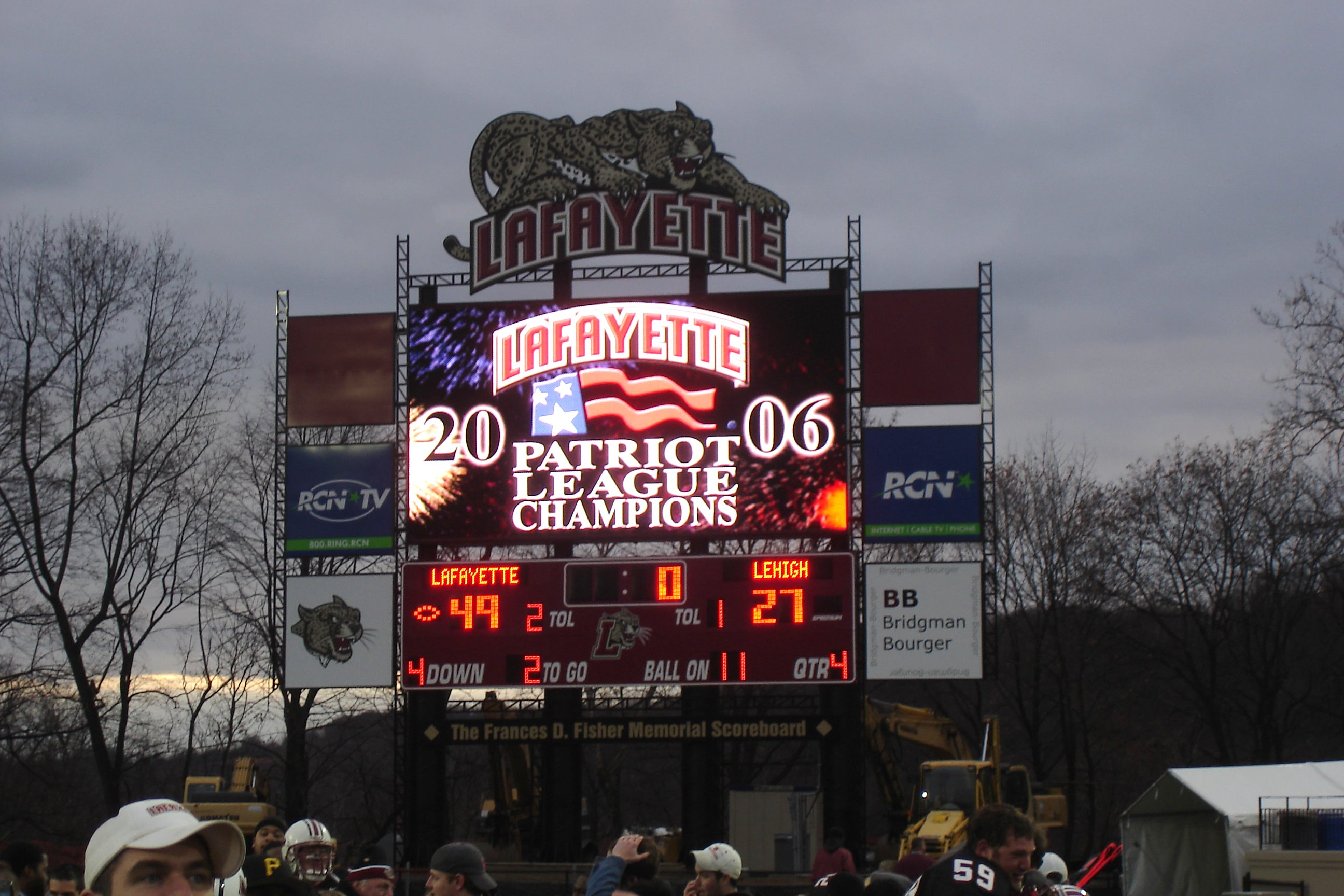
Fisher Stadium's scoreboard following Lafayette College's victory over Lehigh University in the 142nd edition of "The Rivalry" in 2006. The series between the two colleges, which are 17 miles (27 km) away from each other in the Lehigh Valley, is the most-played rivalry in college football history with 158 meetings since 1884.

The Lafayette Leopards compete in the Patriot League under the guidance of current Athletic Director Sherryta Freeman. Lafayette offers students participation in 23 NCAA Division I sports, 18 club sports, and over 30 intramural sports. Student-athletes are considered students first, and athletes second. Lafayette currently ranks third nationally in student-athlete graduation success rate, according to the most recent NCAA study.

In 1896, Lafayette was the first non-Ivy League school to win a national football championship. It was the first to use the "huddle", and the head harness, precursor to the football helmet.

=== Chief rivalry (Lafayette-Lehigh) ===
Lafayette College's athletic program is notable for "The Rivalry" with nearby Lehigh University. Since 1884, the two football teams have met 150 times. This rivalry has had the most games in the history of American college football. It is also one of the oldest (when including high school or secondary school contests). It is also the longest-running rivalry in college football, with the teams playing at least once every year since 1897. The Rivalry is considered to be one of the best in college athletics by ESPNU. It recently ranked as #8 among the Top Ten College Football Rivalries.

== Student life ==
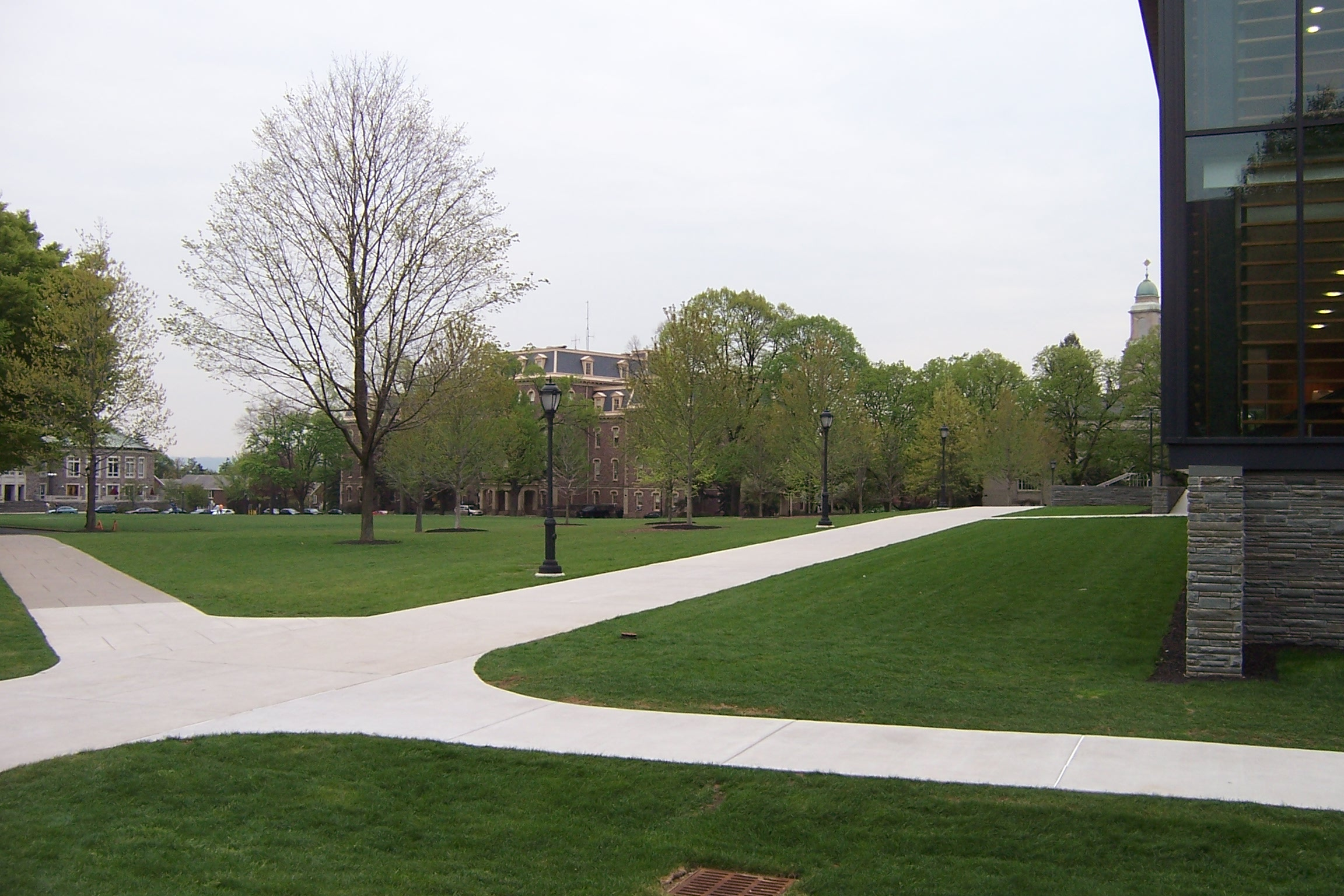
The Quad, the center of Lafayette's campus

Students at Lafayette are involved in over 200 clubs and organizations including athletics, fraternities and sororities, special interest groups, community service clubs and honor societies. The Lafayette College Student Government, consisting of 40 representatives, selected by 12 elected students, is responsible for chartering and supporting most of the student organizations on campus, and is responsible for allocating their budgets to allow these clubs to create programming and events for the campus community. Student Government collaborates with different administrative bodies on campus to improve the community, and is one component of the shared governance model with the faculty, administration, and Board of Trustees, which operates in order to best meet the needs of the students.

=== Greek life ===
Lafayette College has a significant Greek life community. Though students are not eligible to join these organizations until sophomore year, and some Division I athletes are not eligible either, approximately 39% of eligible students join the school's fraternities and sororities.

In addition to the social fraternities and sororities, there are also a number of academic honor societies on campus.

=== Newspaper ===
The Lafayette, Lafayette's weekly student newspaper, was founded in 1870 and is the oldest college newspaper in Pennsylvania. It is published every Friday during the academic year both in print and online. Print copies can be found in most buildings on campus. The newspaper has been published continuously since its creation, with the exception of during World War II, when operations were suspended between fall 1943 and March 1945, and during the start of the COVID-19 pandemic. Over 4,200 digitized issues of The Lafayette are available online in the college's archives. The newspaper publishes an annual satirical edition, called The Scoffayette, on the Friday before April Fools Day. The newsroom is located in the Farinon College Center.

=== Campus radio ===
The college radio station, which was founded in 1946, is WJRH and broadcasts to the campus and greater Lehigh Valley area at 104.9FM.

=== Student government ===
Lafayette College Student Government is composed of six executive officers (president, vice president, treasurer, communications officer, inclusivity officer, and parliamentarian), and 21 general body members who are chosen through an application process and vetted by the elected members. With 27 total members, the student government covers a wide range of topics and serves as a liaison and representation for the student body with college administration.

=== Alpha Phi Omega ===
Alpha Phi Omega, an international co-educational service fraternity, was founded at Lafayette in 1925 by Frank Reed Horton in Hogg Hall. The chapter regained its charter in 2018 and maintains a mission to provide service work on campus and in the Easton community.

=== Investment club ===
Founded in 1946, the club is the oldest student-run investment club in the country. The club made national news in 2016, when CNN profiled their investment skills that led to returns of over 175 times their initial investment over 70 years (from $3,000 in 1946 to $530,000 in 2016), thereby beating the S&P 500 Index. As of April 2023, the portfolio has a market value of over $1 million and contains over 50 stocks.

=== Engineers Without Borders ===
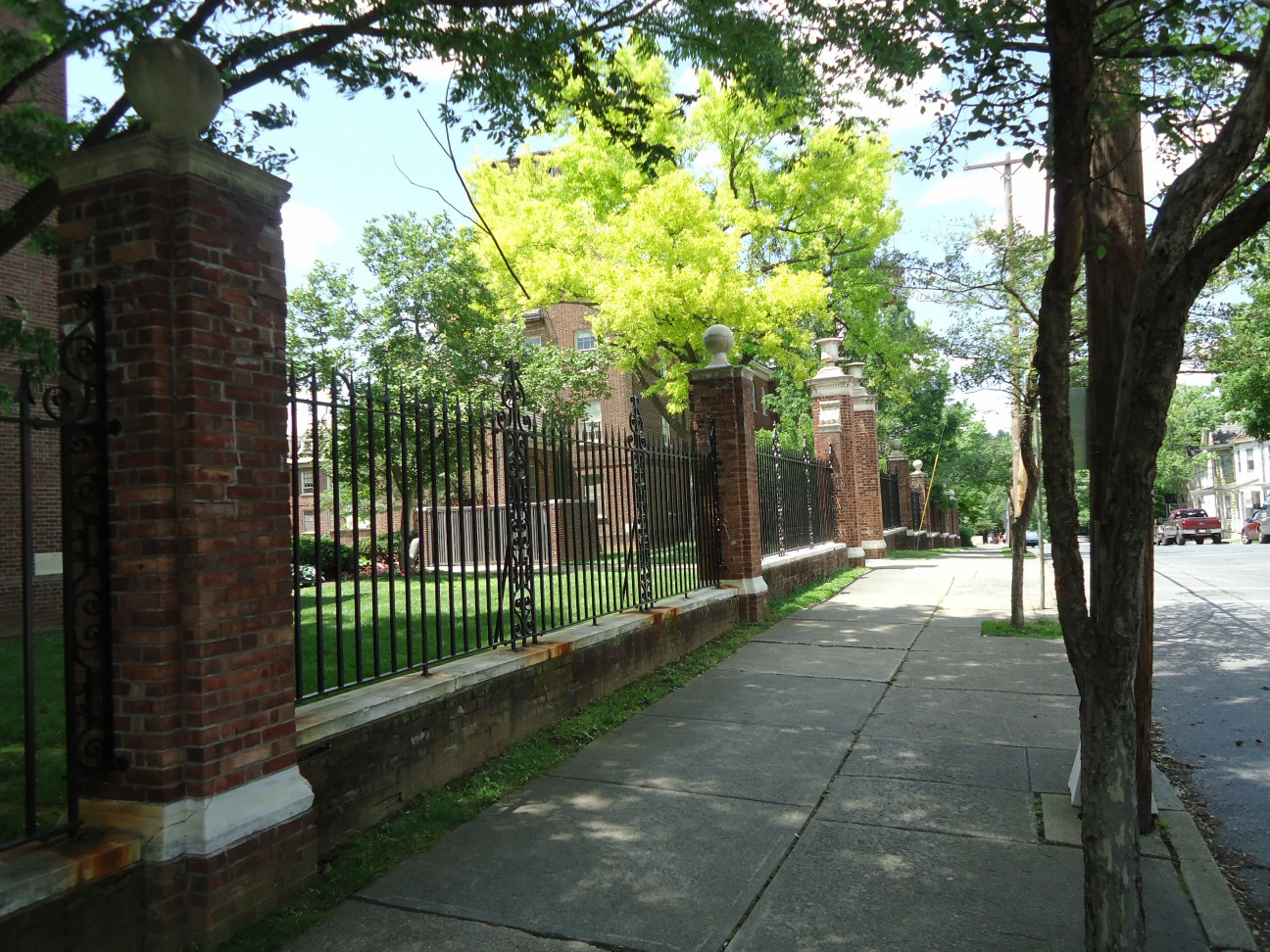
Campus view

The club was founded in 2003 and is a member of EWB-USA. Members of the club represent many disciplines in engineering and the liberal arts. Nationally, the club is linked with rural villages in the Yoro region of Honduras. EWB's mission is to design and implement projects in these villages that help promote better life. The club has focused its efforts on water treatment systems.

El Convento, which is located in the Yoro district of central Honduras, will be the third sustainable water project EWB-LC students have worked on in the country since 2003 when the club was founded. The group has implemented gravity-fed water systems in neighboring Lagunitas and La Fortuna. In La Fortuna, the group utilized a slow sand filter in its system. The group's previous work garnered national media exposure for being one of six national institutions to receive a $75,000 grant from the U.S. Environmental Protection Agency.

At Lafayette, the club mainly focuses on implementing service projects in the community, including a community food bank and volunteering with local high school robotics teams.

=== Lafayette Activities Forum ===
The Lafayette Activities Forum (LAF) is a student-run organization to "promote campus interaction and student relations by incorporating programs and entertainment that reflect the interests of the general student body." LAF is made up of five committees: Class Year Experience, Culture, Media, & Entertainment, Traditions, Music & Coffeehouse, and Marketing. They are in charge of planning events such as the Spring Concert, Fall Fest, the Spot Underground, Open Mic nights, and Live Comedy.

== Notable people ==
Alumni
Name	Class	Notability	Ref.
Alexander Ramsey	1834‡	U.S. Senator, 2nd Governor of Minnesota	
Charles A. Wikoff	1855	United States Army Colonel	
John W. Griggs	1868	43rd U.S. Attorney General, 29th Governor of New Jersey	
Peyton C. March	1884	Chief of Staff of the United States Army	
Stephen Crane	1894‡	Author of The Red Badge of Courage	
Philip S. Hench	1916	Nobel Prize laureate in Physiology or Medicine	
A. Mitchell Palmer	1919‡	50th U.S. Attorney General	
Haldan K. Hartline	1923	Nobel Prize laureate in Physiology or Medicine	
George Decker	1924	Chief of Staff of the United States Army	
S. Donald Stookey	1938	Inventor of CorningWare	
Pete Carril	1952	Basketball coach	
William E. Simon	1952	63rd United States Secretary of the Treasury	
Dominique Lapierre	1952	French author	
Jay Weiss	1962	MacArthur fellow	
Barry Wellman	1963	Sociologist	
Joe Maddon	1976	2x MLB World Series Manager	
Bruce Castor	1983	Acting Attorney General of Pennsylvania	
^{‡} Did not graduate from Lafayette

Faculty
Name	Active tenure	Notability	Ref.
Francis March	1857–1907	Founder of modern comparative linguistics	
William Sebring Kirkpatrick	1875–1877	U.S. House of Representatives	
Eugene C. Bingham	1916–1939	Pioneer of Rheology	
Clement Eaton	1931–1942	Historian	
Theodore Roethke	1931–1935	Pulitzer Prize winning poet	
Donald L. Miller	1978–Present	Author	
Robert Higgs	1983–1989	Developer of Ratchet effect theory	
Guy Consolmagno	1985–1989	Astronomer	
Bruce Allen Murphy	1998–Present	Judicial biographer	

== Works cited ==
- Skillman, David Bishop, The Biography of a College: Being the History of the First Century of the Life of Lafayette College Volume 1. Easton, Pennsylvania, 1932.
- Skillman, David Bishop, The Biography of a College: Being the History of the First Century of the Life of Lafayette College Volume 2. Easton, Pennsylvania, 1932.
- Gendebien, Albert W., The Biography of a College: A History of Lafayette College 1927 - 1978. Easton, Pennsylvania, 1986.
