= Battle of Altamaha Bridge =

Military engagement in the American Civil War

Coordinates: 31°39′18″N 81°49′39″W

- Part of the American Civil War
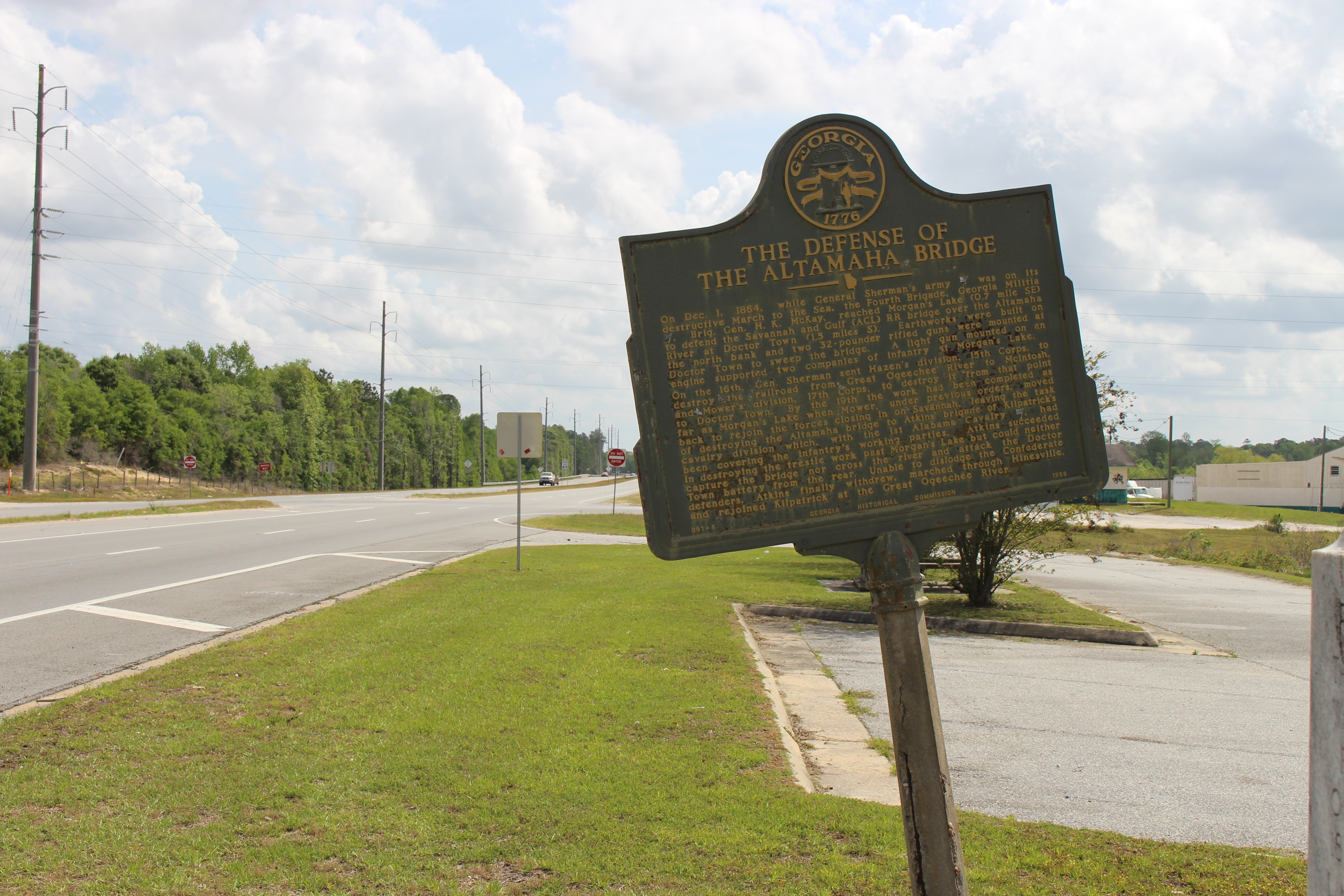
- Historical marker
Date	December 19, 1864
Location	Doctortown, Georgia
Result	Confederate victory

Belligerents
United States	Confederate States

Commanders and leaders
Colonel Smith D. Atkins	Gen. Henry Kent McCay

Strength
2,000	1,000

Casualties and losses
Unknown	Unknown

The Battle of Altamaha Bridge, also known as the Battle for the Doctortown Railroad Trestle, was an American Civil War engagement fought December 19, 1864, in Wayne County, Georgia, during Sherman's March to the Sea. The Confederate victory prevented Federal forces from destroying a vital railroad bridge during Maj. Gen. William T. Sherman's siege of Savannah, keeping open Confederate supply lines to the city.

On December 1, 1864, the Fourth Brigade Georgia Militia under Brig. Gen. Henry Kent McCay arrived in Wayne County to prepare a defense of the Atlantic and Gulf Railroad bridge over the Altamaha River. The Confederates built earthworks on the north bank of Morgan's Lake, which was bisected by the railroad and located just north of the river. On the southern side of the river, two 32-pounder rifled guns were mounted at Doctortown (also spelled Doctor Town), to sweep the bridge if attacked. A light gun mounted on an engine supported two companies of Confederate militia at Morgan's Lake.

On December 16, General Sherman, stalled outside Savannah, sent Union troops to destroy the railroad from the Ogeechee River all the way to the bridge. A brigade of Maj. Gen. Judson Kilpatrick's cavalry under Col. Smith D. Atkins attacked the bridge and destroyed a trestlework past Morgan's Lake, but was unable to capture the bridge or seize the Confederate battery at Doctortown on December 19. The Federals withdrew to the Ogeechee River.
