= Kimberly Benston =

American historian

15th President of Haverford College
- In office July 1, 2015 – June 30, 2019
- Preceded by: Daniel Weiss
- Succeeded by: Wendy Raymond

Personal details
- Born: Kimberly W. Benston; January 18, 1953 (age 73)
- Education: Yale University (BA, MA, PhD)
- Occupation: historian

Academic work
- Discipline: English
- Sub-discipline: Literary history
- Institutions: Yale University; Princeton University; Haverford College

Kimberly W. Benston (born January 18, 1953) is an American literary historian and academic administrator.

== Career ==
Benston earned his bachelor's, master's, and doctoral degree from Yale University.

He taught at his alma mater and Princeton University before joining the Haverford College faculty in 1984. Benston was appointed Francis B. Gummere Professor of English in 2002 and served as provost between 2012 and 2015. He was named president of Haverford College later that year and took office on July 1, 2015. Benston stepped down from the presidency and returned to teaching in 2019.
