= William Truslow Newman =

American judge (1843–1920)

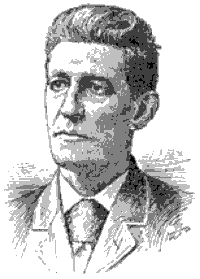

Judge of the United States District Court for the Northern District of Georgia
- In office August 13, 1886 – February 14, 1920
- Appointed by: Grover Cleveland
- Preceded by: Henry Kent McCay
- Succeeded by: Seat abolished

Personal details
- Born: William Truslow Newman; June 23, 1843 Knoxville, Tennessee
- Died: February 14, 1920 (aged 76) Atlanta, Georgia
- Education: read law

William Truslow Newman (June 23, 1843 – February 14, 1920) was a United States district judge of the United States District Court for the Northern District of Georgia.

== Education and career ==
Born on June 23, 1843, near Knoxville, Tennessee, Newman read law to enter the bar in 1866. He was a captain in the Confederate States Army during the American Civil War, from 1861 to 1865. During the war, he was taken prisoner in battle at Johnson's Ferry. Shortly afterwards, he was released in exchange. He returned to fight and lost his right arm in the Battle of Jonesborough. He was in private practice in Atlanta, Georgia from 1866 to 1871. He was the city attorney of Atlanta from 1871 to 1883, thereafter returning to private practice until 1886.

== Federal judicial service ==
Newman received a recess appointment from President Grover Cleveland on August 13, 1886, to a seat on the United States District Court for the Northern District of Georgia vacated by Judge Henry Kent McCay. He was nominated to the same position by President Cleveland on December 9, 1886. He was confirmed by the United States Senate on January 13, 1887, and received his commission the same day. On or about July 31, 1919, President Woodrow Wilson certified Newman involuntarily as disabled in accordance with the act of February 25, 1919, 40 Stat. 1156, which entitled the president to appoint an additional judge for the court and provided that no successor to the judge certified as disabled be appointed. Samuel Hale Sibley was appointed to the additional seat. Newman's service terminated on February 14, 1920, due to his death in Atlanta.

== Family ==
Newman's fifth child was critic, translator, and novelist Frances Newman.

== See also ==
- List of United States federal judges by longevity of service

== Sources ==
Legal offices
Preceded by Henry Kent McCay	Judge of the United States District Court for the Northern District of Georgia; 1886–1920	Succeeded by Seat abolished
