= Charles F. McCay =

American professor and college administrator

Charles F. McCay (1810–1889) was an American professor and college administrator.

Charles McCay was born in Northumberland County, Pennsylvania; his brother, Henry Kent McCay, later became a Federal judge. He attended Jefferson College where George Junkin was one of his classmates, and graduated in 1829. After graduation, he was the tutor for Margaret Junkin Preston, the precocious ten-year-old daughter of his college friend.

In 1832 he began teaching at Lafayette College in Easton, Pennsylvania, as a professor of mathematics, natural philosophy, and astronomy, until 1833. At that time, the school only had a charter; George Junkin started the college as an actual institution, with McCay and James I. Coon as the first two professors. He moved to Georgia and at the University of Georgia, he taught civil engineering, and mathematics. In 1856, he became president of the South Carolina College.

McCay received his Ll.d. degree from the College of New Jersey Law School in 1857.

His papers are held in Special Collections of the University of Georgia.
