= Jay Weiss =

American psychologist

Jay Michael Weiss is an American psychologist.

He graduated from Lafayette College with a B.A. in Psychology in 1962, and Yale University with a Ph.D. in Psychology in 1967. In 1994, he received an honorary doctorate of science from Lafayette College.

== Awards ==
- 1984 MacArthur Fellows Program
- Society of Behavioral Medicine Fellow

== Works ==
- "Effects of Coping Responses on Stress." Journal of Comparative and Physiological Psychology. Vol 65(2), Apr 1968, 251-260.
- "Psychological Factors in Stress and Disease", Scientific American, June 1972: 104-13
- "Does decreased sucrose intake indicate loss of preference in CMS model?", Journal Psychopharmacology, Springer Berlin / Heidelberg, ISSN 0033-3158 Issue Volume 134, Number 4 / December, 1997
- "Effects of chronic antidepressant drug administration and electroconvulsive shock on locus coeruleus electrophysiologic activity", Biological Psychiatry, Volume 49, Issue 2, Pages 117-129 (15 January 2001)
