= Daniel Weiss (art historian) =

American art historian

Dan Weiss
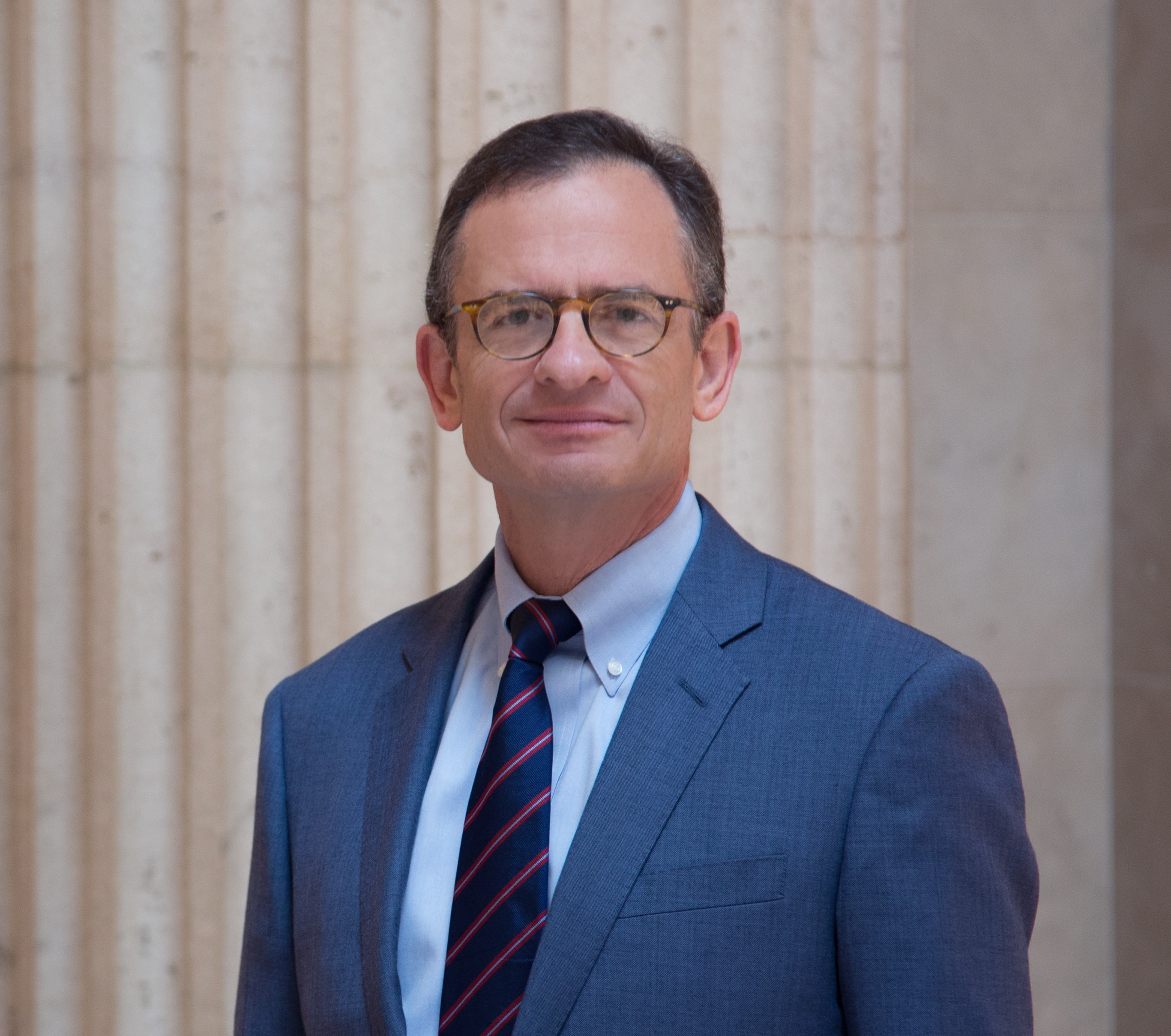
- Weiss in 2018

Director and CEO of the Philadelphia Museum of Art
- Incumbent
- Assumed office December 1, 2025
- Preceded by: Alexandra Suda

CEO of the Metropolitan Museum of Art
- In office February 28, 2017 – July 2023
- Preceded by: Thomas P. Campbell
- Succeeded by: Max Hollein

President of the Metropolitan Museum of Art
- In office March 10, 2015 – July 2023
- Preceded by: Emily Kernan Rafferty

President of Haverford College
- In office 2013–2015
- Preceded by: Joanne V. Creighton
- Succeeded by: Kimberly W. Benston

President of Lafayette College
- In office 2005–2013
- Preceded by: Arthur Rothkopf
- Succeeded by: Alison Byerly

Personal details
- Education: George Washington University (BA); Yale University (MBA); Johns Hopkins University (MA, PhD)

Daniel H. Weiss is an American art historian who has been the president and chief executive officer of the Philadelphia Museum of Art since 2025. He served previously as the president and CEO of the Metropolitan Museum of Art in New York City for eight years.

== Early life and education ==
Weiss was born in Newark, New Jersey and grew up on Long Island, New York. He graduated from the Wheatley School in 1975, George Washington University's Columbian College of Arts and Sciences with a B.A. in psychology in 1979. In 1982 he graduated with a master's in medieval and modern art from Johns Hopkins University and subsequently, in 1985, obtained an MBA from the Yale School of Management. In 1992, he returned to Johns Hopkins and obtained a PhD in Western Medieval and Byzantine Art and a minor in classical Greek art and architecture. His dissertation discussed the Arsenal Old Testament, and was written under the direction of Herbert Kessler.

== Career ==
After obtaining his MBA he joined the management consultancy Booz, Allen & Hamilton in New York. He left in 1989, to obtain his PhD degree and afterwards started working at Johns Hopkins University in Baltimore, where he served as history of art professor and department head from 1992 to 2001 and as dean of faculty from 2001 to 2002.

From 2002 to 2005, Weiss was dean of Johns Hopkins University's Krieger School of Arts and Sciences.

=== College president ===
From 2005 to 2013, he then served as president of Lafayette College. In 2016, the college named their new black box theater in William C. Buck Hall for Weiss and his wife, Sandra. From 2013 to 2015, he served as the president of Haverford College.

=== Metropolitan Museum ===
Weiss was appointed the president of the Metropolitan Museum of Art in 2015, and the president and CEO in 2017. At the time of the announcement, Weiss was quoted, "The Met is a place that strives in everything it does to set a world standard, including its administration."

During the first years of his tenure, Weiss navigated budget issues, and was “widely considered a stabilizing force who has led the Met through a period of financial struggle and low morale.” Then leading through a time of COVID, economic uncertainty, and societal unrest, the Met under Weiss was a leader on several high profile topics (including Sackler philanthropic funding, progress on diversity and inclusion within museums, and the return of museum visitors and financial stability).

Weiss faced high operating deficits when he arrived, which led to staff cuts, and led the museum to improved revenue, fundraising records, and on a path track to a balanced budget by 2020. Part of Weiss's efforts included sequencing large capital projects the museum was planning. He moved ahead with renovations of the skylights over the European Paintings galleries, and paused renovation of the modern wing. After the Met made progress on balancing the budget, Weiss announced moving ahead with major renovation of galleries covering art from Africa, Oceania and the Americas. Steady progress has been made on those and additional building and capital projects, including skylights project completed on schedule; the Children's library renovation; the announcement of renovation of the galleries for Ancient Near East and Cypriot galleries; and the gift of $125 million for the Modern and Contemporary Tang Wing and the selection of Frida Escobedo as its architect.

In 2017, Weiss was named as the museum's president and chief executive officer. His appointment as the Met's top leader received attention in the museum community, as the higher-ranking role in a museum is traditionally the Director.

Weiss advocated for changing the Met's admissions policy for the first time in 50 years—which was controversial, and has ended up being described as highly successful. During Weiss' tenure, the museum set attendance records for three years straight, topping seven million visitors annually.

When the COVID-19 pandemic struck in 2020, under Weiss's leadership, the Met was the first cultural institution to close in New York City, to protect staff and visitors, with others following soon after. Facing the temporary elimination of revenue from areas like admissions, retail and events, as well as the predicted reduction of visitors once the museum could reopen, the Met estimated that it would lose at least $100 million in revenue. Navigating budget crisis included actions such as a hiring freeze and cuts to museum programs, creating an emergency fund, redirecting earnings available from the museum's endowment, and executive pay cuts, including Weiss's. By summer 2020, after five months of closure, the museum was facing $150 million in lost revenue and after keeping nearly all of its staff employed for the duration of the closure, the museum announced layoffs in August 2020. The museum also announced plans to reopen five days a week in August 2020. Attendance increased over ensuing months, and the museum added a sixth day to the schedule in September 2021 and has since offered jobs back to all of the security staff that had been laid off.

In the summer of 2020, the Met issued 13 commitments to anti-racism, diversity, and strengthening the Met community, which addressed a range of areas, including how the museum would be hiring staff to how the museum builds and oversee its collection and programming, to how the museum structures its governance, and engages its community. The museum's commitment to this work has dramatically increased in 2020 and 2021. In August 2021, Museum announced that going forward all Met internships will be paid, as opposed to volunteer. Additionally, funds have been committed to support initiatives, exhibitions, and acquisitions to broaden art-historical narratives; and a $10 million acquisitions endowment was created to increase the amount of works by BIPOC artists in its 20th- and 21st-century collections. The museum also hired its first Chief Diversity Office.

Weiss was the first leader to speak out on several important issues touching museums, including the Trump administration decision to pull out of UNESCO. On October 12, 2017, Weiss voiced, on behalf of the museum:

"President Trump's decision to withdraw from UNESCO undermines the historic role of the United States as a leader in this effort and weakens our position as a strong advocate for cultural preservation. Although UNESCO may be an imperfect organization, it has been an important leader and steadfast partner in this crucial work."

Weiss has also taken positions on Saudi funding in the wake of the assassination of Washington Post journalist Jamal Khashoggi, and the desecration of the U.S. Capitol building in 2021.

Weiss also led the museum's response to concerns over funding from the Sackler family, announcing in 2019 that the Met would turn down financial support from the family and deciding in 2021 to remove the Sackler name from the Met's galleries. The museum's move was described as causing other museums across the field to follow the Met's lead.

== Awards ==
In 2016, Weiss received a Distinguished Alumni Achievement Award from George Washington University.

In 2018, Weiss received an honorary degree from Ithaca College, the Leadership and Society Award from the Yale School of Management, and the Centennial Medal from the Foreign Policy Association. He also holds honorary degrees from Lafayette College (2013) and Randolph Macon College (2017).

In 2021 Weiss was elected to the American Academy of Arts & Sciences.

Weiss was also one of the inaugural recipients of George Washington University's Monumental Alumni Award in 2021. It is the highest form of recognition given by the university to a GW graduate, honoring living alumni who have made an impact on the world through their work and service.

In January 2022 City and State New York honored Weiss with a lifetime achievement recognition in their "50 Over 50" list, which "extols the accomplishments and experience of 50 individuals who are over the age of 50."

== Additional affiliations and memberships ==
Weiss serves on the board of the Samuel H. Kress Foundation. He is also a member of the board of directors of the Posse Foundation, Wallace Foundation, the Library of America, the University Council at Yale, and of the advisory board of the Yale School of Management.

== Works ==
Weiss has published books on several subjects. In June 2017, signed a contract with PublicAffairs for In That Time: A Story of Loss and Reconciliation in the Era of Vietnam. The book was published in November 2019 and well received by critics. In Why the Museum Matters, released in November 2022, "Weiss contemplates the idea of the universal art museum alongside broad considerations about the role of art in society and what defines a cultural experience."

=== Books ===
- Art and Crusade in the Age of Saint Louis. Cambridge University Press, 1998. ISBN 978-0-521-62130-4
- The Book of Kings: Art, War, and the Morgan Library's Medieval Picture Bible. Third Millenium, 2006. ISBN 978-1-903942-16-1
- The Morgan Crusader Bible. Faksimile Verlag Luzern, 1998–1999.
- France and the Holy Land: Frankish Culture at the End of the Crusades. Johns Hopkins University Press, 2004. ISBN 978-0-8018-7823-7
- Remaking College: Innovation and the Liberal Arts. Johns Hopkins University Press, 2013. ISBN 978-1-4214-1134-7
- In That Time: Michael O'Donnell and the Tragic Era of Vietnam. Public Affairs, 2019. ISBN 978-1-5417-7390-5
- Why the Museum Matters. Yale University Press, 2024. ISBN 978-0-300-27685-5

Academic offices
Preceded by Arthur Rothkopf	President of Lafayette College; 2006–2013	Succeeded by Alison Byerly
Preceded by Joanne V. Creighton	President of Haverford College; 2013-2015	Succeeded by Kimberly W. Benston
Cultural offices
Preceded by Emily Kernan Rafferty	President of the Metropolitan Museum of Art; 2015–2023	Succeeded by Position vacant
Preceded by Thomas P. Campbell	CEO of the Metropolitan Museum of Art; 2017–2023	Succeeded by Max Hollein
