= Richard F. Lyon (judge) =

American judge (1819–1893)

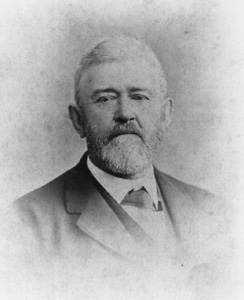
Richard F. Lyon Sr.

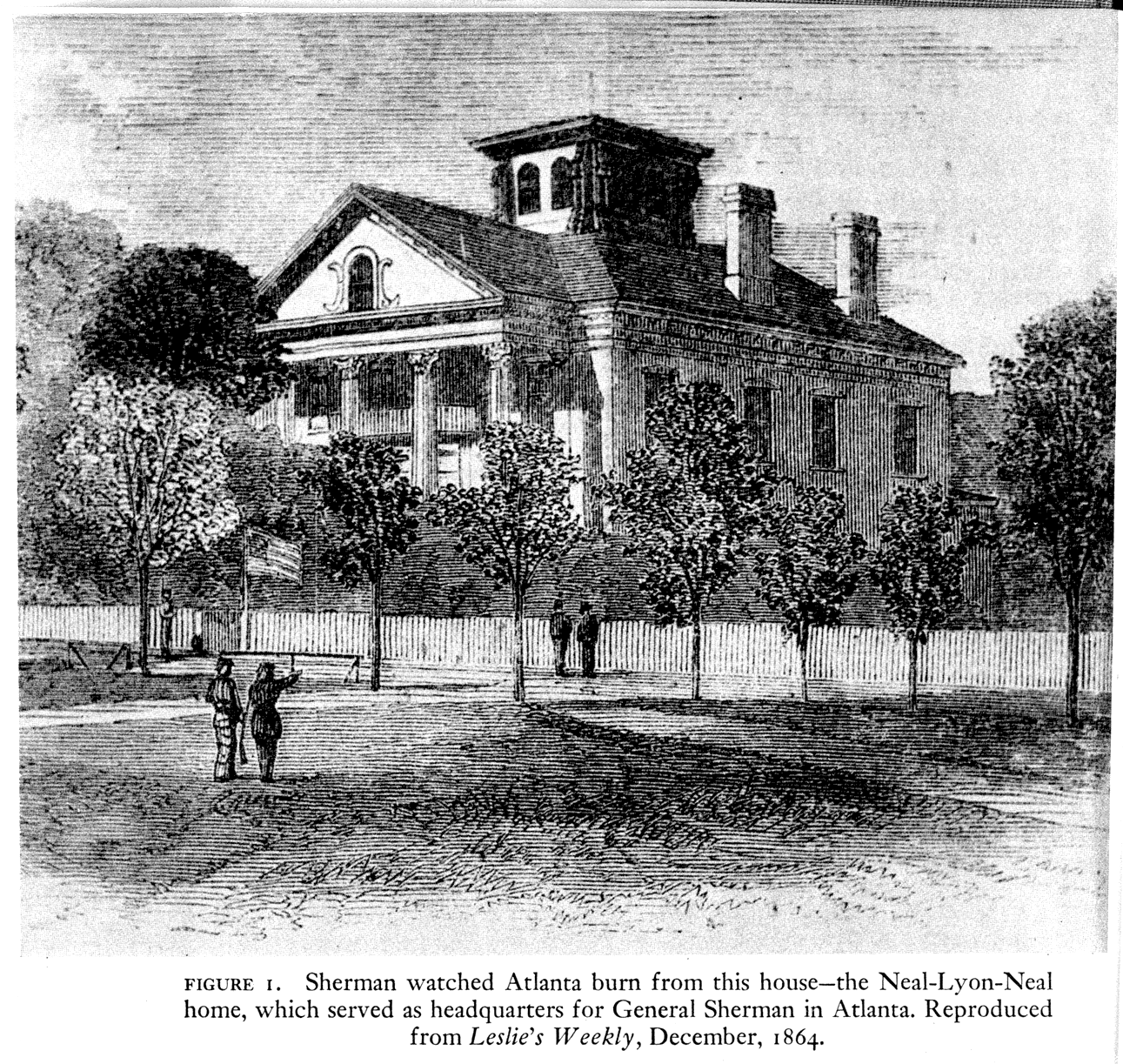
Lyon's home in Atlanta

Richard Francis Lyon (1819–1893) was an American attorney and jurist before and during the Confederacy. He was the mayor of Albany, Georgia, from 1858 to 1859 and an associate justice of the Supreme Court of Georgia from 1859 to 1865.

== Family ==
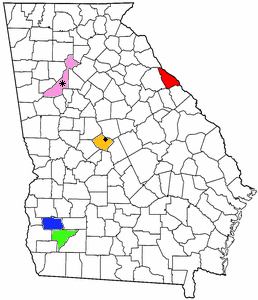
Lincoln County (red), Dougherty County (blue), Baker County (green), Atlanta, Fulton County (pink) and Macon, Bibb County (orange), Georgia

The oldest son of Thomas Pickett Lyon and Mary Winn Lyon (1823–1895), born September 9, 1819, in Lincoln County, Georgia, Lyon married Ruth Esther Knowles on June 17, 1841; they had eight children: Emily, Julia, Kitty, Richard, Lafayette, Roland, John, and William. He is sometimes called Richard F. Lyon Sr., since he had a son Richard F. Lyon Jr. (1850–1906), and a grandson Richard F. Lyon III (1884–1964).

Richard Lyon and his brother John were both attorneys in Dougherty County, Georgia.

Lyon owned the house that Gen. Sherman took as his headquarters during his occupation of Atlanta, Fulton County, between his Atlanta campaign and his March to the Sea in 1864. The current Atlanta City Hall stands on the site of this house.

After the Civil War, Lyon moved his family to Macon, Bibb County, Georgia, where he lived until his death. His nephew, Thomas R. Lyon, was also a resident of Albany, Georgia, being active in political and social life.

== Political and professional ==
Photo from reference 1

As the Whig party candidate, Lyon narrowly lost a bitter race against the Democratic party candidate Nelson Tift for the house seat from Baker County, Georgia, in 1847.

In 1856 Lyon was living in Albany, Dougherty County, Georgia, where he joined the Albany Guards. He was Albany's mayor from 1858 to 1859, and was an associate justice of the Supreme Court of Georgia from 1859 to 1865.

Lyon served under Georgia's first chief justice, Joseph Henry Lumpkin, due to a Georgia law that said "The oldest Judge in commission is the Chief Justice, or President thereof, but without greater powers than his associates." He lost the election in the state senate for a second six-year term to Dawson A. Walker.

In an 1860 opinion:

Justice Richard F. Lyon ruled that the duties of the railroad to safeguard slaves were its duties toward passengers rather than freight: "The carrier has not, and can not have, the same absolute control over [a slave] that he has over inanimate matter. ... He is, in fact, a passenger, paid for as a passenger and so treated and held, not only by defendant but by plaintiff."

From 1872 to 1874 he represented Dougherty County in the Georgia state legislature. He also served as attorney for the city of Albany, and for the Central of Georgia Railroad.

His local Daughters of the American Revolution chapter called Lyon "one of the most brilliant lawyers the state has ever produced."

In a memorial published by the Supreme Court of Georgia, Lyon was described as a superior lawyer for southwestern Georgia who was "irascible, dogmatic and combative", but also "a mere child of impulse...a very peculiar character, full of contrasts and contradictions, and difficult to describe". The memorial concluded that "He was better fitted for the bar than the bench, but his decisions as a judge are characterized by clearness and force, and held in high esteem by the bar."
