= Steven G. Poskanzer =

American academic administrator

Steven Poskanzer
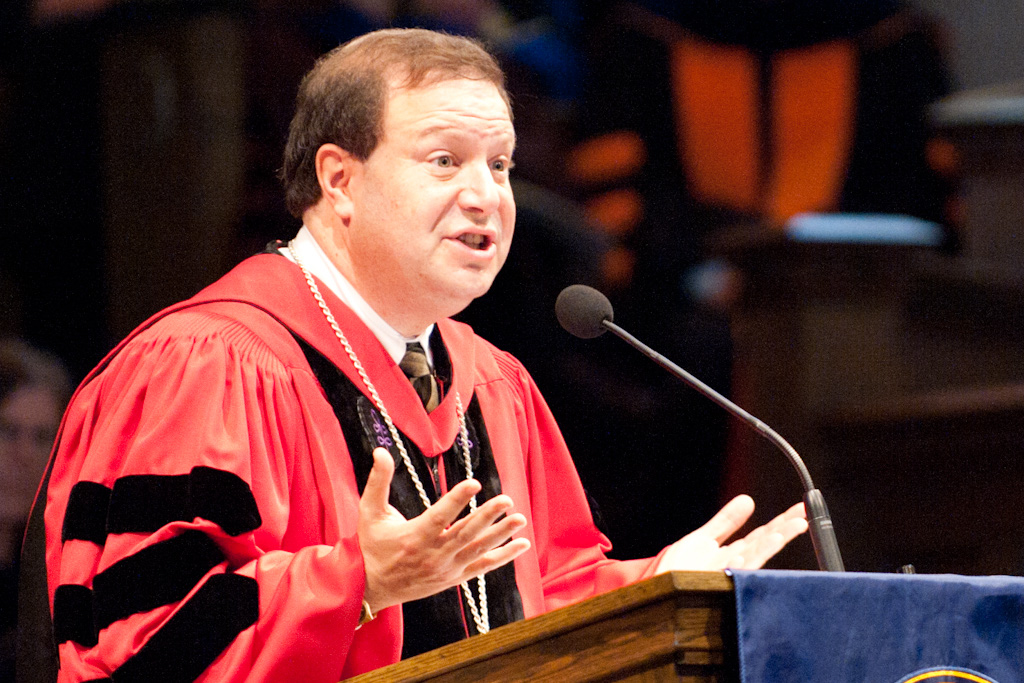
- Poskanzer at his 2010 inauguration

11th President of Carleton College
- In office 2010–2021
- Preceded by: Robert A. Oden
- Succeeded by: Alison Byerly

6th President of State University of New York at New Paltz
- In office 2001–2010
- Preceded by: Roger Bowen
- Succeeded by: Donald Christian

Personal details
- Education: Princeton University; Harvard Law School (J.D.)

Steven Poskanzer is an American academic who served as the 11th president of Carleton College in Northfield, Minnesota. Previously, he was chief of staff to the president at the University of Chicago for four years, then spent 12 years at the State University of New York at New Paltz where he served as president from 2001 until 2010, when he became Carleton's president.

== Biography ==
Poskanzer has served as a commissioner of the Middle States Commission on Higher Education and on the boards of directors for Mid-Hudson Pattern for Progress, the Mohonk Mountain House, the Mohonk Preserve, and St. Luke's Cornwall Hospital.

Poskanzer began his academic career as a lawyer in the general counsel's office at the University of Pennsylvania, and his research activities have included academic freedom and other issues of higher education law. His book entitled Higher Education Law: the Faculty was published in 2002 by the Johns Hopkins University Press.

He graduated cum laude from Princeton University in 1980, with a degree from the Woodrow Wilson School of Public and International Affairs and a concentration in African studies; he went on to earn his J.D. from Harvard University in 1983.

Poskanzer became Carleton's 11th president in August, 2010.

On August 28, 2020, Poskanzer announced that the 2020–2021 academic year would be his final year as Carleton's president. Poskanzer officially left his role as president in July 2021, staying at Carleton as a professor of political science.
