= Dawson A. Walker =

American judge (c. 1820–1881)

Dawson Armstrong Walker (c. 1820 – February 5, 1881) was a justice of the Supreme Court of Georgia from 1866 to 1868.

Walker was "a prominent Republican". In 1866, he was elected by the state senate to a seat on the state supreme court, defeating incumbent Justice Richard F. Lyon. In 1872, he was the Republican nominee for Governor of Georgia, but was defeated by James Milton Smith. An 1874 testimonial written in favor of Walker by Jonathan W. H. Underwood identified Walker as being 54, formerly a judge of the superior and supreme courts; the author attested, "I have known D. A. Walker thirty years as an upright, able, and painstaking lawyer". He was noted as being "regarded as one of the best lawyers in Georgia... often consulted by the bar upon vexed and intricate questions".

Walker died at his home in Atlanta.

Political offices
Preceded by Richard F. Lyon	Justice of the Supreme Court of Georgia; 1866–1868	Succeeded by Henry Kent McCay
