= Frances Newman =

American novelist

Frances Percy Newman
- Born: September 30, 1883; Atlanta, Georgia, U.S.
- Died: October 22, 1928 (aged 45); New York City, New York, U.S.
- Occupation: Novelist
- Writing career
- Genre: Non-fiction

Frances Percy Newman (1883–1928) was a Modernist novelist, translator, and librarian who critically examined the difficulties faced by women in the American South. Although her career was extremely short, she drew the attention and support of notable novelists and critics like H. L. Mencken, Sherwood Anderson, and James Branch Cabell.

== Early life, education, librarianship ==
Frances Percy Newman was born September 13, 1883, in Atlanta, Georgia, to a socially prominent family. Her father, William Truslow Newman, was a judge and Confederate war hero, while her mother, Fanny Perry (Alexander) Newman, was a member of an old Tennessee family. She had four sisters and a brother, and would later take in a nephew after one of her sisters died.

Newman was educated at schools in Atlanta, Washington, D.C., and New York City before attending Agnes Scott College briefly. She received a degree in library science from the Atlanta Carnegie Library (later the Emory University School of Library Science) in 1912.

After graduating, she worked as a librarian first at Florida State College for Women and then at the Atlanta Carnegie Library, where she stayed until 1923. She left to pursue further studies at the Sorbonne in Paris. On her return in 1924, she accepted a new position as head librarian at the Georgia Institute of Technology but took a leave the following year to devote more time to her writing.

== Writing ==
Newman began her career writing essays on contemporary novelists for the Carnegie Library bulletin and book reviews for newspapers in Atlanta and New York; witty and astute, these drew the attention of critic H. L. Mencken and novelist James Branch Cabell. Her first published book was a short story anthology translated from five languages entitled The Short Story's Mutations: From Petronius to Paul Morand (1924). In 1924, she also won an O. Henry Memorial Award for her short story "Rachel and Her Children."

Recommendations from Mencken and novelist Sherwood Anderson helped her get a residency in 1926 at the MacDowell Colony in New Hampshire, where she completed her first published novel, The Hard-Boiled Virgin (1926). It was a bestseller despite (or because of) being banned in Boston due to sexual content, and its success enabled Newman to devote herself to writing full-time. Cabell called it a "shining minor masterpiece."

A year later, she returned to the MacDowell Colony to work on her second novel, Dead Lovers Are Faithful Lovers (1928), which was also banned in Boston for erotic content.

During a second European sojourn in 1928, Newman began to suffer from serious vision problems. She returned to New York for treatment, and while seeing a series of neurologists was found unconscious in her hotel room on October 19. She died three days later, with the initial cause of death reported as a cerebral hemorrhage; later the cause was changed to a drug overdose. Earlier that year humorist Corey Ford (under the pseudonym John Riddell) had published a parody of her writing style titled "Dead Novelists are Good Novelists" in which the writer, dismayed by critical rejection, leaps from the window of her apartment.

Newman left behind some unpublished works, including her first novel—a comedy of manners entitled The Gold-Fish Bowl (1921)—and a translation of short fiction by the French poet Jules Laforgue. The latter, her last completed project, was published posthumously not long after her death as Six Moral Tales from Jules Laforgue. In 1929, her collected letters were published as Frances Newman Letters edited by Hansell Baugh with a preface by Cabell.

Newman was a satirical writer with an experimental streak, and a rare feminist voice in the Southern literature of her era. Cabell memorably described "the inexpressibly tired voice of Frances Newman speaking in shrewd malice very plaintively." Her novels are disguised morality tales or modern fables, and they shocked many Southern readers with their candid critique of the educational, social, and career restrictions that distorted the lives of women. As they were openly critical of Southern racism and patriarchal values, they were denounced by the group of writers known as the Southern Agrarians, who excluded her from their canon of Southern Renaissance writers.

Newman's papers—including manuscripts, correspondence, a scrapbook, and miscellaneous printed matter—are held by the Georgia Institute of Technology.

== Books ==
- The Short Story's Mutations (1924)
- The Hard-Boiled Virgin (1926)
- Dead Lovers Are Faithful Lovers (1928)
- Six Moral Tales from Jules Laforgue (1928)
