= Nicole Hurd =

American academic and university administrator

18th President of Lafayette College
- Incumbent
- Assumed office July 1, 2021
- Preceded by: Alison Byerly

Personal details
- Born: 1970 (age 54–55)
- Children: 2
- Education: University of Notre Dame (BA); Georgetown University (MA); University of Virginia (PhD)

Nicole Hurd (born 1970) is an American academic who became the 18th president of Lafayette College in Easton, Pennsylvania, on July 1, 2021. She is the founder and CEO of College Advising Corps (CAC), the largest college access program in the country which aims to aid low-income, first-generation, and underrepresented high school students to enter and complete higher education.

== Education ==
Hurd attended Marlborough School in Los Angeles, and then went on to graduate from the University of Notre Dame with a bachelor's degree. She then went on to Georgetown University to earn her master's degree and afterwards earned a PhD in religious studies from the University of Virginia.

== Career ==
Hurd began her career at the University of Virginia where she served as an Assistant Dean and as the Director of the Center for Undergraduate Excellence. It was at the University of Virginia where she created the College Guide Program which was the precursor to the College Advising Corps. Due to its initial success the College Guide Program received a $10 million grant from the Jack Kent Cooke Foundation which allowed it to expand into ten other states.

After the expansion of the College Guide Program, Hurd moved to the University of North Carolina at Chapel Hill to develop the College Advising Corps. Since its inception in 2005, it has helped an estimated 300,000 students enroll in college. Its goal of 1 million students is hoped to be reached by 2025. Due to its success, Hurd was honored at the White House in 2016 as a "Champion of Change for College Opportunity".

In 2018, Hurd was awarded an Honorary Doctorate from Franklin and Marshall College, and was recognized as one of Time Magazine's Top 31 People Who Are Changing the South. She has also been recognized on The Chronicle of Higher Education's Influence List, and Washington Monthly's list of most innovative people in higher education.

On July 1, 2021, Hurd became the 18th president of Lafayette College in Easton, Pennsylvania. In January 2025, she became the first president in the college's history to lose a no-confidence vote from the faculty.

== Personal life ==
Hurd's husband, Bill, previously worked at Georgetown University in the athletics department. Together they have two children.

Academic offices
Preceded by Alison Byerly	President of Lafayette College; 2021–present	Succeeded by Incumbent
