= International Anti-Corruption Court =

Proposed international tribunal

The International Anti-Corruption Court (IACC) is a proposed international court that would strengthen the enforcement of criminal laws against corrupt leaders. The effort to establish the court was first proposed by Judge Mark L. Wolf, a Senior Judge of the United States District Court for the District of Massachusetts, at the 2012 St. Petersburg International Legal Forum, the 2014 World Forum on Global Governance, and in articles for the Brookings Institution and The Washington Post in 2014.

The IACC proposal was further developed in a 2018 paper published in Daedalus, the journal of the American Academy of Arts and Sciences, titled "The World Needs an International Anti-Corruption Court." In 2022, the American Academy of Arts and Sciences published a paper by Judge Mark L. Wolf, Justice Richard Goldstone and Professor Robert Rotberg, titled "The Progressing Proposal for An International Anti-Corruption Court."

The campaign to create the IACC has been led by Integrity Initiatives International (III), an NGO that Judge Mark L. Wolf founded in 2016 with Judge Richard Goldstone, former Justice of the Supreme Court of South Africa and chief prosecutor of the International Criminal Tribunal for the Former Yugoslavia and the International Criminal Tribunal for Rwanda, and other colleagues. III's mission is to "strengthen the enforcement of criminal laws in order to punish and deter leaders who are corrupt and regularly violate human rights, and to create opportunities for the democratic process to replace them with leaders dedicated to serving their citizens." Establishing the IACC, supporting national anti-corruption measures, and forging a network of young people committed to fighting grand corruption in their own countries are some of its main priorities.

== Structure ==
Grand corruption – the abuse of public power for private gain by a nation's leaders (kleptocrats) – is a major barrier to responding effectively to pandemics, fighting climate change, promoting democracy and human rights, meeting the UN Sustainable Development Goals, establishing international peace and security, and securing a more just, rules-based global order.

Grand corruption does not endure due to a lack of laws. The 189 countries that are party to the United Nations Convention Against Corruption (UNCAC) each have laws criminalizing corrupt conduct. Yet kleptocrats enjoy impunity because they control the administration of justice in the countries that they rule.

The IACC would fill a crucial gap in the international framework for combatting grand corruption. The IACC would enforce existing national anti-corruption laws, or a new international counterpart to them, against kleptocrats and their conspirators. The IACC would be a court of last resort. Operating on the principle of complementarity, it would only prosecute if a member state were unwilling or unable to prosecute a case itself. In this way, the IACC may act as incentive for domestic governments to establish adequate anti-corruption processes while ensuring that corrupt leaders are held accountable where the effective processes do not yet exist.

Prosecution in the IACC would, in many cases, result in the incarceration of convicted kleptocrats and thus create the opportunity for the democratic process to replace them with honest leaders. It is also foreseeable that kleptocrats will not permit the countries they rule to join a court that would prosecute them. In order to be effective, the IACC would need 20 to 25 representative countries to be effective as long as they include some major financial centers through which kleptocrats often launder the proceeds of corruption, and attractive countries in which kleptocrats invest and spend their wealth. The IACC would have jurisdiction to prosecute crimes if any or all elements of the crime were committed within the territory of a member state or by a national of a member state, and could therefore tackle transnational criminal networks.

Not only would successful prosecution of a kleptocrat result in his or her incarceration, but it would also result in an order of restitution or disgorgement of illicit assets or gains for the benefit of victims. The IACC would also have the potential to recover, repurpose, and repatriate stolen assets through sentences that include orders of restitution in criminal cases and possibly judgments in civil cases brought by whistleblowers, a small portion of which would be used to fund the Court itself.

The IACC's expert investigators, prosecutors, and judges would be valuable resources for strengthening their counterparts in countries striving to improve their capacity, and it would provide a forum for evidence raised by whistleblowers. In these respects, the IACC is similar to, but distinct from, the International Criminal Court (ICC), and may be designed in a way that draws on the strengths of the ICC model while avoiding some of its weaknesses.

== Support ==
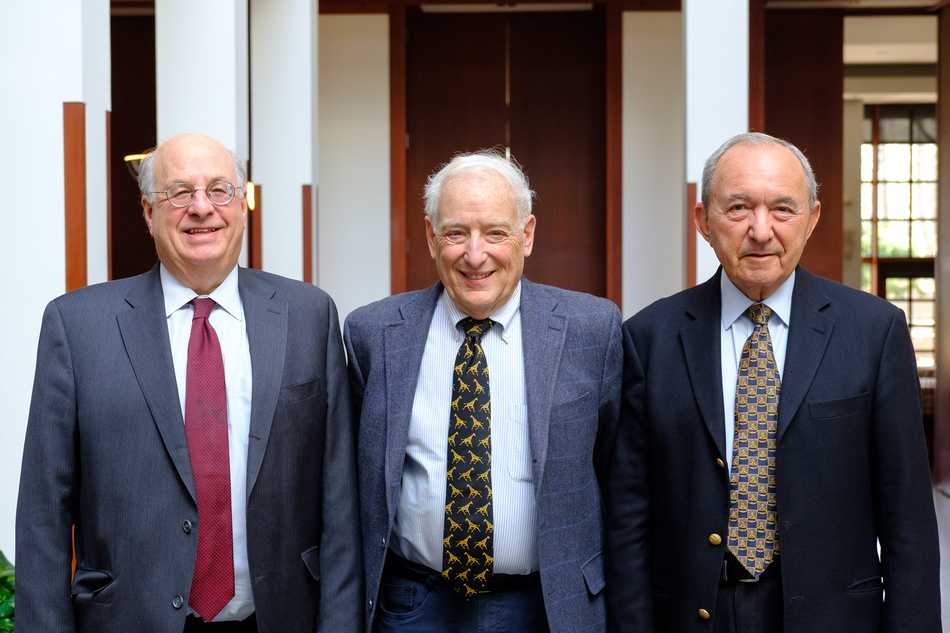
Mark L. Wolf, Robert Rotberg, and Richard Goldstone meeting at the American Academy of Arts and Sciences to discuss the International Anti-Corruption Court (2019).

Support for the IACC is growing. In June 2021, more than 125 world leaders from over 45 countries signed the Declaration in Support of the Creation of the IACC, including Nobel laureates, former heads of state and government, high court justices, former cabinet ministers, business leaders, and representatives of civil society. The Declaration was drafted by Integrity Initiatives International, a non-profit organization working to support and advance anti-corruption efforts including the IACC.

Many more prominent leaders continue to sign the Declaration in support of the IACC. In May 2022, Integrity Initiatives International announced that the Declaration has now been signed by nearly 300 eminent individuals from over 80 countries, including 32 Nobel laureates and 45 former presidents and prime ministers.

Supporters include Gordon Brown, former Prime Minister of the United Kingdom, who published an op-ed in March 2022 titled "An international anti-corruption court would bring Putin to justice". The Declaration in support of the IACC has also been signed by José Ramos-Horta, current president of Timor-Leste.

For the 2021 parliamentary elections in Canada, the platforms of both the Liberal and Conservative parties included support for the IACC. At the Summit for Democracy convened by President Biden in December 2021, Canada committed to convening "a national high level, multi-sectoral roundtable to explore options to strengthen the international legal framework and architecture to combat corruption globally." Also in December 2021, supporting the creation of the IACC became an official foreign policy of Canada when the new Canadian Foreign Minister was given the mandate to "[work] with international partners to help establish an International Anti-Corruption Court, to prevent corrupt officials and authoritarian governments from impeding development that should benefit their citizens."

In April 2022, Dutch Foreign Minister Wopke Hoekstra announced his commitment to work towards establishing an International Anti-Corruption Court and asked his European Union counterparts to join this effort. Integrity Initiatives International is working with partners in Canada and the Netherlands to assist the foreign ministries in this endeavor.

There is also high-level interest in the IACC in Colombia, which was the first country to endorse the IACC, Moldova, Spain, and Sweden, among other countries. A growing coalition of civil society networks in many countries, including Chile, Colombia, Nigeria, North Macedonia, South Korea, and Zambia, are now urging their governments to support the creation of the IACC.

The campaign to establish the IACC is emulating other successful civil society-led international campaigns, such as International Campaign to Ban Landmines (ICBL) and the International Campaign to Abolish Nuclear Weapons (ICAN). The International Coordinating Committee for the IACC campaign, which is staffed by Integrity Initiatives International, is building a global coalition of civil society organizations to advocate for the IACC.

== Criticisms ==
In a report published by The Heritage Foundation in October 2014, "Why the U.S. Should Oppose the Creation of an International Anti-Corruption Court," Brett D. Schaefer, Steven Groves, and James M. Roberts outlined a number of arguments against the establishment of an International Anti-Corruption Court.

In a post for the Global Anticorruption Blog titled, "Is an International Anti-Corruption Court a Dream or a Distraction?" Matthew Stephenson argued that the IACC was idealistic. In a U4 Brief, he and Sofie Arjon Schütte questioned whether the IACC would divert resources away from other, more effective, ways of combatting grand corruption.

== Select Speeches and Publications ==
- Wolf, Mark L. (2014). "The Case for an International Anti-Corruption Court". The Brookings Institution.
- Wolf, Mark L. (2014). "We need an international court to stamp out corruption". The Washington Post.
- Ganesan, Arvind (2014). Oral Testimony of Arvind Ganesan, Business and Human Rights Director, Human Rights Watch, Tom Lantos Human Rights Commission Briefing: An International Anti-Corruption Court (IACC) to Mitigate Grand Corruption and Human Rights Abuses (Speech). Human Rights Watch.
- Tom Lantos Human Rights Commission (2015). An International Anti-Corruption Court (IACC) to Mitigate Grand Corruption and Human Rights Abuses (Speech). Lantos Commission Hearing.
- Wolf, Mark L. (2016). Rule of Law Initiative Inaugural Lecture (Speech). Woodrow Wilson Center.
- Wolf, Mark L. (2016). An International Anti-Corruption Court for Grad Corruption (Speech). International Anti-Corruption Summit in London.
- Wolf, Mark L. (2018). How do you stop prime ministers and presidents lining their own pockets with the country's wealth? An International Anti-Corruption Court (Speech). BBC Hardtalk.
- Wolf, Mark L. (2018). "The World Needs an International Anti-Corruption Court". Daedalus. 147 (3): 144–156. doi:10.1162/daed_a_00507. S2CID 57571237.
- Roach, Brendan, and Erik Mortensen (2019). "An International Anti-Corruption Court." American Academy of Arts and Sciences.
- Antony, Joseph (2020). Anti-Graft War: Stakeholders at UNGA 74 Call for Establishment of International Anti-Corruption Court (Speech). Herald Nigeria. Archived from the original on June 25, 2020.
- Goldstone, Richard J., and Mark L. Wolf (2020). "Coronavirus presents bonanza for kleptocrats." The Boston Globe.
- Axworthy, Lloyd, and Allan Rock (2020). "Let's hold the kleptocrats to account." The Globe and Mail.
- Glavin, Terry (2021). "Canadians are leading the push for a global anti-corruption court". MacLean's Magazine.
- Rohani, Farid (2021). "World needs Canada to champion an international anti-corruption court". Toronto Star.
- Escobar Mejia, Claudia (2021). "The Case for an International Anti-Corruption Court". Americas Society Council of Americas.
- Dezenski, Elaine (2021). "An international anti-corruption court is needed to deter kleptocrats". Financial Times.
- Green, Ruth (2021). "Covid-19: Pandemic heightens calls for international court to tackle grand corruption." International Bar Association.
- Malcorra, Susan, and Ian J. Lynch (2021). "Deterring Kleptocracy Demands an International Anti-Corruption Court." Global Governance Forum.
- Axworthy, Lloyd, and Fen Osler Hampson (2021). "Canada should lead in creating an international court to fight corruption." Toronto Star.
- Lynch, Ian J., and Maja Groff (2021). “Taking the Climate Crisis Seriously Requires Ambitious Anti-Corruption Solutions.” The Diplomat.
- MacKay, Peter (2022). “An international court to crack down on corruption.” National Post.
- Wolf, Mark L. (2022). "The Progressing Proposal for An International Anti-Corruption Court." American Academy of Arts and Sciences.

== See also ==
- Anti-corruption
