= Mark L. Wolf =

American judge (born 1946)

Mark Lawrence Wolf
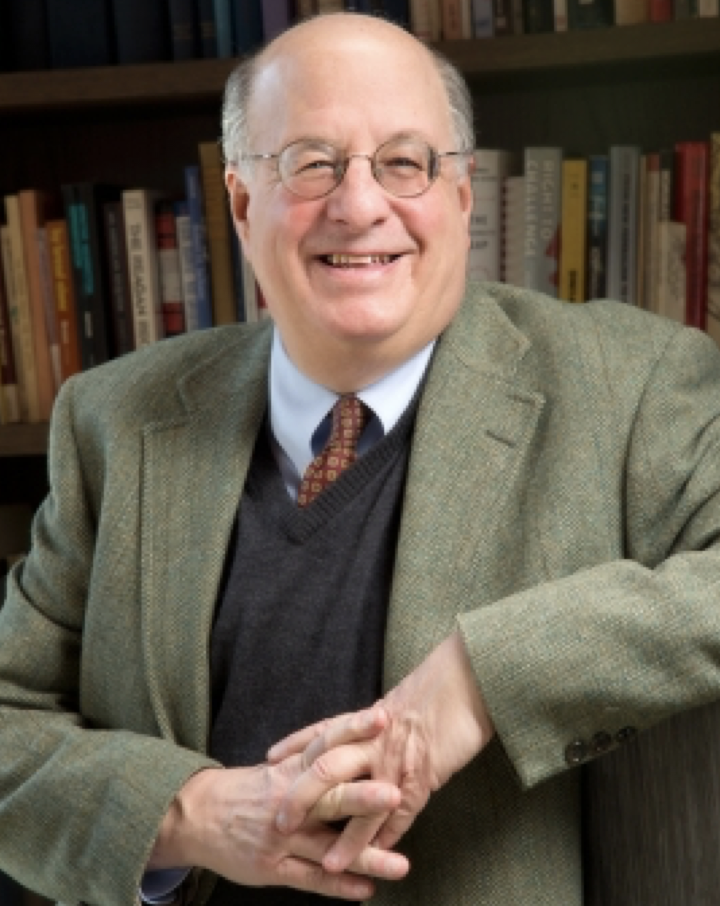

Senior Judge of the United States District Court for the District of Massachusetts
- In office January 1, 2013 – November 7, 2025

Chief Judge of the United States District Court for the District of Massachusetts
- In office 2006–2012
- Preceded by: William G. Young
- Succeeded by: Patti B. Saris

Judge of the United States District Court for the District of Massachusetts
- In office April 4, 1985 – January 1, 2013
- Appointed by: Ronald Reagan
- Preceded by: Seat established by 98 Stat. 333
- Succeeded by: Indira Talwani

Personal details
- Born: Mark Lawrence Wolf; November 23, 1946 (age 79) Boston, Massachusetts, U.S.
- Education: Yale University (BA); Harvard University (JD)

Mark Lawrence Wolf (born November 23, 1946) is a former U.S. district judge of the United States District Court for the District of Massachusetts. He is the founder and CEO of Integrity Initiatives International.

Wolf was nominated to the U.S. District Court by President Ronald Reagan and confirmed by the Senate in 1985. In 2006, he became Chief Judge of the court, and served in that position until 2013. He was also a member of the Judicial Conference of the United States, having previously served on its committees on Criminal Law, the Rules of Criminal Procedure, and Codes of Conduct. On January 1, 2013, Wolf took Senior Status.

== Early life and education ==
Mark Wolf was born in Boston, Massachusetts. He graduated from Yale University in 1968 and from Harvard Law School in 1971.

== Career ==
Prior to his appointment as judge in 1985, Wolf served in the United States Department of Justice as a Special Assistant to United States Deputy Attorney General Laurence Silberman (1974) and as a Special Assistant to United States Attorney General Edward Levi (1975-1977) after the Watergate scandal. During his time at the Department of Justice, he received a Certificate of Appreciation from President Gerald Ford for his service in the resettlement of Indochinese refugees. Wolf also worked in private practice in Washington, D.C., with Surrey, Karasik & Morse, and in Boston with Sullivan & Worcester.

From 1981 to 1985, Wolf was Deputy United States Attorney and Chief of the Public Corruption Unit in the District of Massachusetts. In the first three years, Wolf's unit achieved more than 40 consecutive convictions, which included corrupt officials close to Boston Mayor Kevin White. In 1984, he received the Attorney General's Distinguished Service Award for exceptional success in prosecuting public corruption.

In 1985, Mark Wolf was appointed to serve as United States district judge for the District of Massachusetts. When Wolf announced that he would become a Senior Judge in 2013, the Boston Globe published a summary of the most notable cases of his judicial career. He was awarded the Boston Bar Association's Citation for Judicial Excellence (2002 and 2007), and similar citations from the Boston Chapter of the Federal Bar Association (2009), and the Massachusetts Bar Association (2012). On January 1, 2013, Wolf took senior status. After more than 40 years as a U.S. District Judge, Wolf retired on November 7, 2025 at the age of 78.

In a November 2025 essay for The Atlantic magazine, Wolf explained that he had relinquished his senior judicial status in order to publicly speak out against the "assault on the rule of law" under President Donald Trump, which he termed an "existential threat to democracy", speech that would otherwise be precluded under judicial rules. Wolf's resignation ended a secret judicial investigation into allegations that he was abusive toward a law clerk and perhaps created a hostile work environment for other court personnel.

== Notable rulings ==
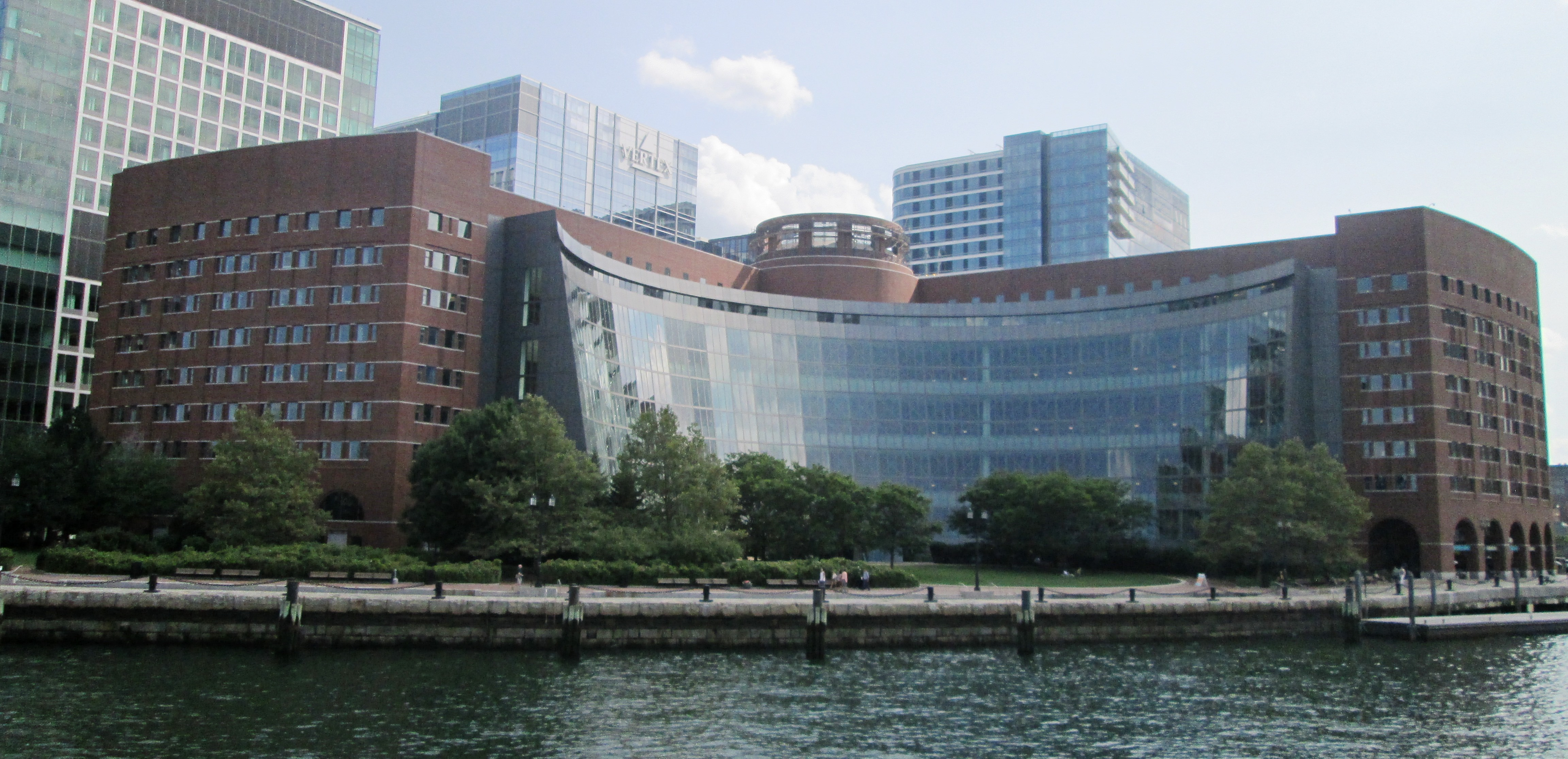
The John Joseph Moakley United States Courthouse as seen from Boston Harbor.

=== South Boston Allied War Veterans Council v. Boston (1995) ===
From 1901 until 1947, the city of Boston, Massachusetts, sponsored public celebrations of St. Patrick's Day and Evacuation Day, which marks the departure of British troops from the city in 1776. In 1947, Mayor James Michael Curley gave authority for organizing the parade over to the South Boston Allied War Veterans Council, a group of unincorporated private citizens selected from a variety of Boston veterans' groups – the only group to apply for a permit until 1992. That year, the Irish-American Gay, Lesbian and Bisexual Group of Boston (GLIB) requested that it be allowed to march in the parade alongside the usual participating groups. GLIB argued that it was not a group primarily aimed at conveying a "gay, lesbian, and bisexual message." In 1995, Judge Wolf ruled that the South Boston Allied War Veterans Council could prohibit participation by those who endorsed that political stance as an exercise of the organizers' free speech under the First Amendment, and encouraged GLIB to organize its own parade. He ordered the city of Boston to issue the parade permit, which it had been threatening to withhold, to South Boston Allied War Veterans Council. In a related case, The Supreme Court of the United States unanimously agreed with Wolf's decision in a landmark judgement on free speech, specifically the right of groups to determine what message their activities convey to the public. The Court ruled in Hurley v. Irish-American Gay, Lesbian, and Bisexual Group of Boston that private organizations, even if they had permits for a public demonstration, may exclude groups if those groups presented a message contrary to the one the organizing group wanted to convey.

=== United States v. Salemme (1998) – The Whitey Bulger Case ===
Judge Wolf's judicial work exposed corruption in the Federal Bureau of Investigation's handling of matters involving notorious criminals James “Whitey” Bulger and Stephen Flemmi. In 1998, Wolf ordered the FBI to divulge that Bulger and Flemmi were top echelon FBI informants. Following nine months of hearings, Wolf issued a 661-page decision finding that the FBI had not investigated Bulger and Flemmi for serious crimes, including murder; it had warned Bulger and Flemmi when other federal agencies were investigating them; it told Bulger and Flemmi of informants against them who were, as a result, killed; and it told Bulger and Flemmi that they were about to be charged so they could flee, which Bulger did. Although Flemmi had not been granted immunity from FBI prosecution, Wolf decided that the information he had provided could not be used against him. The ruling was reversed by the Court of Appeals, but the defendants, except Bulger who was a fugitive, eventually pled guilty. Several years later, investigators found a grave in Boston with the bodies of three of Bulger’s victims. Bulger was finally apprehended in 2011, convicted, and sentenced to serve life in prison, where he was murdered. In an editorial, The New York Times credited "Judge Wolf's courage and persistence" in the case. Since then, the government has paid out more than $100 million in claims to the families of people murdered by informants shielded by the FBI, an FBI agent was later sentenced to 50 years in prison, and there were Congressional hearings into the FBI's use of murderers as informants.

=== Sampson v. United States (2003) ===
In July 2001, Gary Lee Sampson carjacked and murdered two people: Philip McCloskey (aged 69 of Taunton, Massachusetts), Jonathan Rizzo (aged 19 of Kingston, Massachusetts), and later killed a third, Robert Whitney (aged 58 of Concord, New Hampshire). The murders of McCloskey and Rizzo were federal offenses. Sampson pled guilty. Wolf acknowledged that "Sampson's motion to dismiss present[ed] a serious question whether the Federal Death Penalty Act (FDPA) is unconstitutional because of the mounting evidence that innocent individuals have been sentenced to death, and undoubtedly executed, more often than previously understood." Nevertheless, Wolf held that declaring the FDPA unconstitutional was not legally justified. In sentencing Sampson to life in prison, Wolf said: "You personify the wisdom of [the poet Auden who wrote] “Evil is unspectacular and always human … And shares our bed and eats at our own table.”" He later added that "By committing horrific crimes that virtually compelled decent people in this community to condemn you to die, you have diminished, if not degraded, us all." After discovering that a juror had lied to be selected to serve, Judge Wolf vacated Sampson's sentence and ordered a new trial.

=== Parker v. Hurley (2007) ===
In 2007, Judge Wolf ruled that religiously motivated parents do not have a constitutional right to exempt their elementary school children from teaching on homosexuality and same-sex marriage, finding that there was no evidence of extreme indoctrination that might constitute a form of coercion. In his opinion he wrote that "public schools are entitled to teach anything that… helps students become engaged in democracy… reduces future discrimination… teaches young children to understand and respect others… [and] makes homosexual students feel more comfortable."

=== United States v. DiMasi (2011) ===
In 2009, Salvatore DiMasi, the former speaker of the Massachusetts House of Representatives, and three others were charged with conspiracy, honest services fraud, mail fraud, and wire fraud. Federal prosecutors later added an extortion charge against DiMasi. DiMasi was convicted after a seven-week trial. Wolf sentenced him to serve eight years in prison for extortion and honest services fraud. At the time, Wolf said he hoped that DiMasi's sentence would put a stop to Beacon Hill, Boston’s "culture of arrogance."

=== Kosilek v. O'Brien (2012) ===
Michelle Kosilek, a pre-operative transsexual who had been convicted of murdering her partner, sued the Massachusetts Department of Corrections (DOC), arguing that its refusal to provide sex reassignment surgery constituted "cruel and unusual punishment" under the Eighth Amendment to the United States Constitution. In September 2012, Judge Wolf ordered the DOC to provide Kosilek with sex reassignment surgery, which the DOC's medical personnel determined was medically necessary as a treatment for Kosilek's gender dysphoria. In 2006, The Boston Globe had opposed Kosilek's surgery because "private insurers rarely pay for sex-change operations" and "hormone treatment and expert therapy" are "sufficient". However, in 2012, The Boston Globe wrote that Wolf's decision made a persuasive case that the surgery was "medically necessary, not an elective procedure," however "distasteful." In his ruling, Wolf found that "Michelle Kosilek, who lives as a woman in a male prison facility, had experienced "intense mental anguish," and said there was a serious medical need" for her to have the procedure. Wolf’s decision was initially affirmed but ultimately reversed on appeal.

=== Calderon v. Nielsen (2018) ===
In 2018, five undocumented immigrants and their spouses filed a lawsuit against the US government alleging that they were unlawfully arrested and detained by U.S. Immigration and Customs Enforcement (ICE). Some were detained after interviews, at which they demonstrated that they were truly married. Wolf rejected the government's argument that the case should be dismissed, repeatedly finding that ICE was illegally detaining the aliens pending resolution of their immigration case.

== Integrity Initiatives International ==
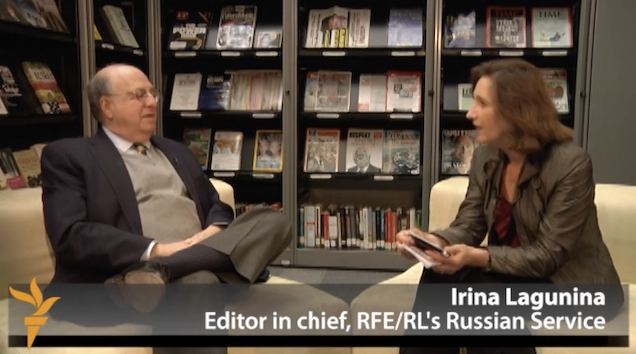
Wolf speaks to Radio Free Europe/Radio Liberty's Russia Service, May 30, 2013.

In 2016, Judge Wolf, South African Justice Richard Goldstone, and colleagues founded Integrity Initiatives International (III) to combat grand corruption, also known as "kleptocracy." The mission of III is to "strengthen the enforcement of criminal laws in order to punish and deter leaders who are corrupt and regularly violate human rights, and to create opportunities for the democratic process to replace them with leaders dedicated to serving their citizens."

In order to achieve this, III advocates for the creation of an International Anti-Corruption Court (IACC), a concept which Wolf first proposed in articles for the Brookings Institution and The Washington Post in 2014. The IACC proposal was further developed in a paper Wolf published in 2018 in Daedalus, the journal of the American Academy of Arts and Sciences, entitled “The World Needs an International Anti-Corruption Court.” In 2022, the American Academy of Arts and Sciences published a paper by Wolf, Goldstone and Professor Robert Robert I. Rotberg, titled “The Progressing Proposal for An International Anti-Corruption Court.”

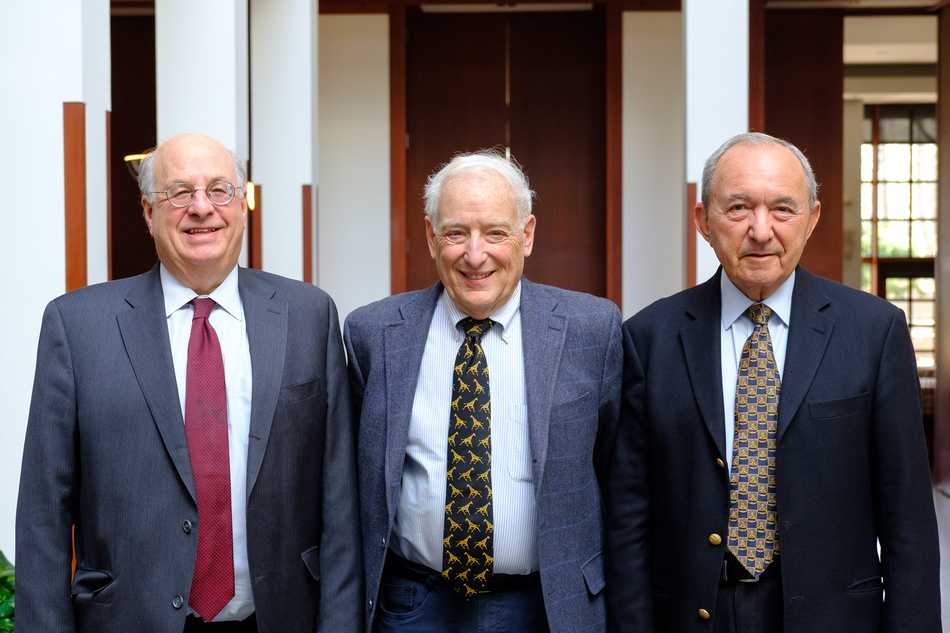
Wolf, Robert Rotberg, and Richard Goldstone meet with distinguished judges, attorneys, and academics to discuss the International Anti-Corruption Court at the American Academy of Arts and Sciences, March 20, 2019.

In 2016, President Juan Manuel Santos declared Colombia the first country to endorse the IACC. His successor President Iván Duque Márquez of Colombia also endorsed the IACC.

In May 2022, nearly 300 world leaders, including more than 30 Nobel laureates, more than 40 former presidents and prime ministers, from over 80 countries, signed a Declaration in support of establishing the IACC. The proposed IACC would enforce existing national anti-corruption laws, or a new international counterpart to them, against kleptocrats and their conspirators. The IACC would be a court of last resort. Operating on the principle of complementarity, it would only prosecute if a member state were unwilling or unable to prosecute a case itself.

Prosecution in the IACC would, in many cases, result in the incarceration of convicted kleptocrats and thus create the opportunity for the democratic process to replace them with honest leaders. The IACC would also have the potential to recover, repurpose, and repatriate stolen assets through sentences that include orders of restitution in criminal cases and judgments in civil cases brought by whistleblowers, a small portion of which would be used to fund the Court itself. The IACC would need 20 to 25 representative countries to be effective as long as they include some financial centers through which kleptocrats often launder the proceeds of corruption, and countries in which kleptocrats invest and spend their wealth.

In addition to the IACC, Wolf and III have supported national anti-corruption efforts, such as the High Anti-Corruption Court in Ukraine, for which Wolf has provided expert recommendations and mentored Ukrainian judges.

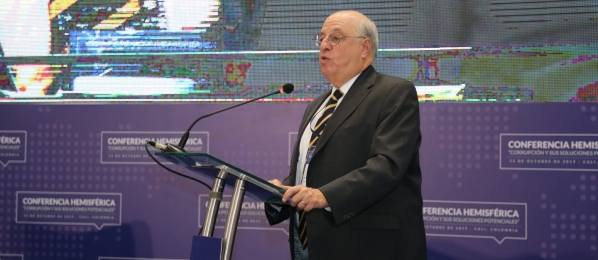
Wolf speaking at the Global Hemispheric Anti-Corruption Conference in Cali, Colombia in October 2019.

== Outside activities ==
Judge Wolf has been: a non-resident fellow at the Woodrow Wilson International Center for Scholars; an adjunct lecturer in public policy at the Harvard Kennedy School, where he taught a seminar on Combatting Corruption Internationally; a Fellow at the Harvard Institute of Politics; and a Senior Fellow at the Carr Center for Human Rights Policy at Harvard Kennedy School. He is a member of the Council on Foreign Relations. He taught courses on the role of the judge in American democracy at Harvard Law School, Boston College Law School, New England Law Boston School, and the University of California-Irvine Law Schools.

Wolf is also chairman emeritus of the John William Ward Public Service Fellowship, chairman emeritus of the Albert Schweitzer Fellowship, and former chair of the Judge David S. Nelson Fellowship.

Legal offices
Preceded by Seat established by 98 Stat. 333	Judge of the United States District Court for the District of Massachusetts; 1985–2013	Succeeded by Indira Talwani
Preceded by William G. Young	Chief Judge of the United States District Court for the District of Massachusetts; 2006–2012	Succeeded by Patti B. Saris
