= Hania Morsi Fadl =

Sudanese radiologist

Hania Morsi Fadl OBE
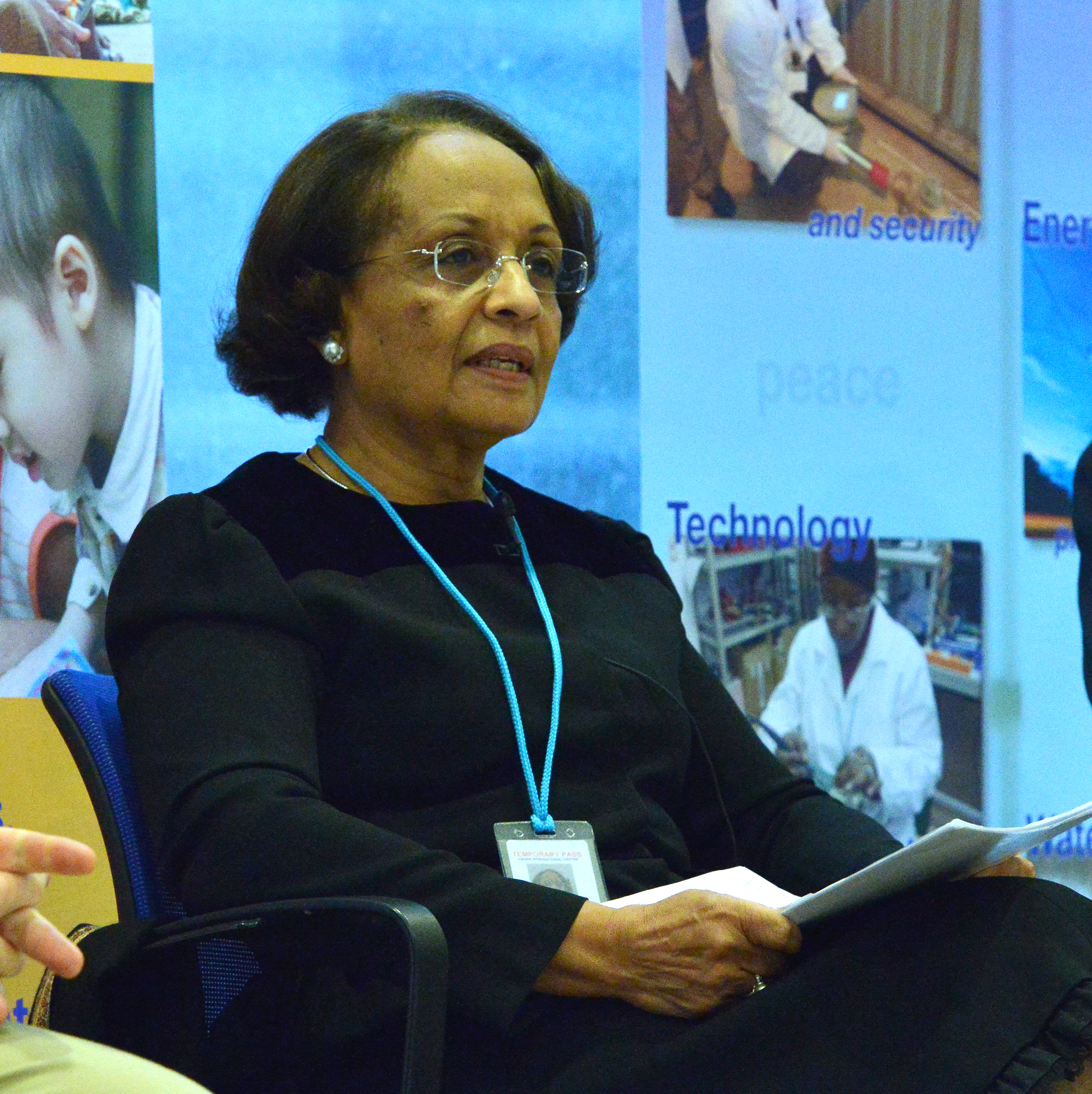
- Education: Alexandria University
- Occupation: Diagnostic radiology
- Known for: Women's health activism
- Spouse: Mo Ibrahim (m. 1973, divorced)
- Children: 3, including Hadeel Ibrahim
- Honours: Fellow of the Royal College of Radiologists

Hania Morsi Fadl OBE is a Sudanese-British radiologist and the founder and Chief Executive Officer of the Khartoum Breast Cancer Centre.

== Early life and education ==
Fadl graduated from Alexandria University in 1970.

== Career ==
Fadl practised medicine in Sudan for four years before moving to the United Kingdom on a government scholarship. She specialised in diagnostic radiology, working for several years at St Bartholomew's Hospital. In 1987 she was appointed as a consultant in radiology in Birmingham. She joined the National Breast Cancer Screening Program as a consultant in Charing Cross Hospital in 1990, and remained there until 2008. She is a Fellow of the Royal College of Radiologists.

=== Health activism in Sudan ===
In 2008 Fadl established the Khartoum Breast Cancer Centre, a not-for-profit facility that provides screening and diagnostic services to vulnerable women. She was one of the first radiologists in Sudan, and the first to diagnose breast cancer. The centre was supported by the Mo Ibrahim Foundation. The centre is the only one of its kind in the Horn of Africa, and offers subsidised and often free treatment. Staff from the centre go to schools and universities to raise awareness, giving lectures and teaching young women how to self-examine. They use medical equipment purchased from General Electric, which was impacted by America's economic sanctions on Sudan. In 2015, the US embargo against Sudan resulted in Fadl lobbying the US government for ten weeks to repair the only digital mammography machine in the country. The sanctions impact the types of chemotherapy drugs that the centre can offer and result in surgeons relying on non-calibrated anesthesia machines.

== Honours ==
Fadl was appointed an Officer of the Order of the British Empire in the 2015 Birthday Honours, "For services to improving healthcare for women in Sudan". That year she was also awarded an Order of Distinction from Omer Hassan Al-Bashir. Fadl was awarded a Social Leadership Award at the London Arabia Organization's Arab Women of the Year 2017 awards. In 2018 she was interviewed by the World Association for Sustainable Development. In February 2018 OkayAfrica recognised Fadl as one of Africa's Top 100 women.
