= Program on Intrastate Conflict and Conflict Resolution =

The Program on Intrastate Conflict and Conflict Resolution is a program of the Belfer Center for Science and International Affairs at Harvard Kennedy School at Harvard University. The program analyzes the causes of ethnic, religious, and other intercommunal conflict, and seeks to identify practical ways to prevent and limit such conflict. It is concerned with the vulnerability of weak and failed states, with good governance, with improving leadership, with peace building and peace enforcement capabilities in Africa, Asia, and the Caribbean, and with the role of truth commissions in conflict prevention and conflict resolution. The program was established 1 July 1999.

One of the more recent aims of the program, headed by its director, Robert I. Rotberg, is to develop an Index of African Governance. The Index evaluates the governance of 48 African nations as a continuation of the program's ongoing efforts to assist Africans in strengthening governance and leadership throughout the continent.

The Program on Intrastate Conflict has published a number of books including Building a New Afghanistan; When States Fail; and Worst of the Worst: Dealing with Repressive and Rogue Nations.

The program supports and sponsors an international group of fellows whose research focuses on all aspects of conflict within states; ethnic/religious/linguistic conflict; peacekeeping and peace building; conflict prevention in general; conflict resolution, especially in divided states; all aspects of state failure and the prevention of state failure.
