= Hadeel Ibrahim =

Sudanese-British philanthropist

- Born: September 1983 (age 42–43)
- Education: University of Bristol
- Occupations: Philanthropist, CEO of Mo Ibrahim Foundation
- Board member of: Clinton Foundation
- Parents: Mohammed Ibrahim (father); Hania Morsi Fadl (mother)

Hadeel Ibrahim (born September 1983) is a Sudanese-British philanthropist.

== Early life ==
Hadeel Ibrahim was born in September 1983. Her father, Mohammed Ibrahim, is a Sudanese billionaire businessman. Her mother, Hania Morsi Fadl, is a radiologist and founder of the Khartoum Breast Cancer Clinic. She has a bachelor's degree in Politics and Philosophy from the University of Bristol.

== Philanthropy ==
Ibrahim has served as the founding executive director of the Mo Ibrahim Foundation since 2006. She serves on the board of directors of the Clinton Foundation, the Mary Robinson Foundation for Climate Justice and the Synergos Institute. She also serves as the co-chair of the board of directors of The Africa Center, and on the council of advisors of Refugees International. She is a patron of Restless Development.

== Personal life ==
Ibrahim resides in London, UK, and New York City, but spends much of her time in Africa.
