= Kaba Rougui Barry =

Guinean politician and entrepreneur

Minister Delegate for Guineans Abroad
- In office 30 December 2010 – February 2014
- President: Alpha Condé
- Prime Minister: Mohamed Said Fofana
- Succeeded by: Sanoussy Bantama Sow

Minister of Pre-University, Technical, Vocational Education and Civic Education
- In office January 2009 – February 2010
- President: Moussa Dadis Camara; Sékouba Konaté
- Prime Minister: Kabiné Komara
- Preceded by: Aïcha Bah Diallo
- Succeeded by: Amadou Lélouma Diallo

Mayor of Matam
- In office 1991–2000

Personal details
- Born: 23 September 1953 Mamou, French Guinea (now the present-day Guinea)
- Died: 13 March 2016 (aged 62) Morocco
- Party: URF; RPG
- Education: Paris-Panthéon-Assas University
- Occupation: Politician

Kaba Rougui Barry (23 September 1953 – 13 March 2016) was a Guinean politician and entrepreneur.

== Early life and education ==
Barry was born on 23 September 1953 in Mamou to the local noble family. She was the second child of 10 siblings. She then moved to Conakry in an unknown year and attended primary education at school in the Coléah neighborhood of Conakry from 1962 to 1968. Afterward, she enrolled at CER de Coléah and received the Certificate of Secondary Education (BEPC) with honors in 1972. She then studied at Lycée 02 octobre and earned a Baccalauréat certificate in Mathematics and Physics in 1975.

Barry continued her higher education by taking a pre-training course in civil engineering. After that, she enrolled at Paris-Panthéon-Assas University and earned a degree in economics in 1981.

== Entrepreneurial career ==
She began her career as a businesswoman. In 1986, she became the first female coffee exporter in Guinea. Her entrepreneurial career continued while serving as the Mayor of Matam. In 1993, she founded a battery manufacturing plant that employed 400 workers.

== Political career ==
=== Mayor of Matam ===
In 1990, Barry decided to run for the Matam mayoral election after being persuaded by a group of young people. She was elected mayor of Matam in 1991, making her the first female mayor in Guinea. She was re-elected in 1996. However, Lansana Conté did not endorse Barry and prevented her from being inaugurated as a mayor for seven months. In 2000, she joined the opposition party, URF, after the passing of a regulation stipulated that mayoral candidates had to become members of a political party. Nevertheless, she could not participate in the 2000 Matam Mayor Election after Lansana Conté invalidated her mayoral candidacy for being part of the opposition.

Under her tenure, she constructed footbridges overlooking the Fidel Castro highway. Apart from that, she encouraged women to take jobs in dyeing and soap making and created a framework that allowed the jobless youth to encounter business leaders. While serving as mayor, she also joined the African Managers Club from 1991 to 2000.

=== Post-mayoral era (2000-2009) ===
Upon stepping down as mayor in 2000, Barry moved to Saint-Denis and worked as a trader by erecting her business company. She also got involved in several humanitarian actions. She founded NGOs that provided jobs to the youth. She became the leader of the NGO Aid for Sustainable Development (ADD) in 2006. On 29 March 2004, Barry was arrested and put into detention for 44 days under the accusation of conspiracy to overthrow the government. During the detention, she went on a nine-day hunger strike to protest the injustice. Previously, she was banned from leaving the country when she boarded a plane to Paris on 24 March. She announced her candidacy for the commune election in 2005. Nevertheless, the government rejected it.

=== Political career (2019-2016) ===
In January 2009, Moussa Dadis Camara appointed Barry as the Secretary-General of the Ministry of Transport for two days, then promoted to Minister of Pre-University, Technical, Vocational Education, and Civic Education, replacing Aisha Bah. Barry was requested to participate in the preparation for the 2010 Guinean presidential election on 8 March 2010. She announced her presidential candidacy from the Guinean Party for Renaissance and Progress for the 2010 presidential election. She was then appointed the National Coordinator of the RPG leader election in November 2010.

Condé assigned Barry as the minister delegate for Guineans Abroad on 30 December 2010. Guinean deportees from Libya who had arrived in the country accused Barry of embezzling the Saudi and Belgium-funded integration assistance of $300,000 as the fund never reached them. Apart from that, a computer merchant named Moussa Diallo denounced Barry for not paying the debt of computers and laptops that she purchased for the Ministry of Guineans abroad office equipment. However, she denied that the ministry purchased the computer with Moussa Diallo but with Joly Decor company instead, and she claimed that the ministry had paid the purchase to the company.

In 2014, she stepped down from the ministerial position when she was designated as the president's advisor on 4 February. Conakry faced violence during the 2015 Guinean presidential election campaign and she called the Guineans to " remain calm and show restraint."

== Death ==
Barry died in Morocco on 13 March 2016 due to an illness. Her body was flown to Guinea, and the funeral was held on 18 April 2016. She is buried in Cameroon Cemetery, Conakry.

== Personal life ==
Barry belongs to Fulani and she was a Muslim. She got married in 1988 to the deputy director of customs in Conakry, Mamady Kaba and had five children.

== Legacy ==
In 2018, a foundation named after Barry was founded, MME Kaba Rougui Barry & Babies Foundation aiming to assist the poor and needy.
