= Mo Ibrahim =

Sudanese-British businessman

Sir Mo Ibrahim KCMG
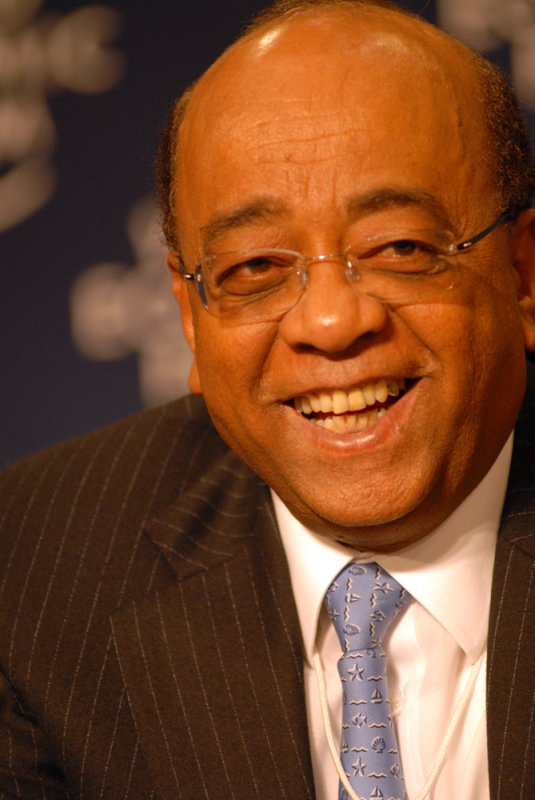
- Ibrahim in 2007
- Born: Mohammed Fathi Ahmed Ibrahim; 3 May 1946 (age 80); Sudan
- Citizenship: British
- Education: Alexandria University (BSc); University of Bradford (MSc); University of Birmingham (PhD)
- Occupations: Businessman, engineer
- Spouse(s): Hania Morsi Fadl (m. 1973, divorced), Jane Ibrahim (before 2020)
- Children: 3, including Hadeel Ibrahim

Sir Mohammed Fathi Ahmed Ibrahim KCMG (Arabic: محمد إبراهيم; born 3 May 1946) is a Sudanese-British billionaire businessman. He worked for several telecommunications companies, before founding Celtel, which, when sold, had over 24 million mobile phone subscribers in 14 African countries. After selling Celtel in 2005 for $3.4 billion, he set up the Mo Ibrahim Foundation to encourage better governance in Africa, as well as creating the Ibrahim Index of African Governance, to evaluate nations' performance. He is also a member of the Africa regional advisory board of London Business School.

In 2007 he initiated the Mo Ibrahim Prize for Achievement in African Leadership, which awards $5 million to African heads of state who deliver security, health, education and economic development to their constituents and democratically transfer power to their successors. Ibrahim has pledged to give at least half of his wealth to charity by joining The Giving Pledge.

According to the Forbes 2011 Billionaire List, Ibrahim was worth US$1.8 billion. He was also selected for the TIME magazine's "Top 100" list in 2008 and was ranked first in the annual Powerlist of influential Black Britons.

== Early life and education ==
Mo Ibrahim was born on 3 May 1946 in Sudan, of Nubian descent, the second of five children, four of whom were boys. His family moved to Alexandria, Egypt, when he was young, and father Fathi was employed there by a cotton company, and his mother Aida was very keen that they all get a good education.

Ibrahim has a bachelor's degree from Alexandria University in electrical engineering. In 1974, he returned to Sudan and started working for the telephone company, Sudan Telecom. He moved to England and earned a master's degree from the University of Bradford in Electronics and Electrical Engineering, and a PhD from the University of Birmingham in Mobile Communications.

== Career ==
Before funding the Mo Ibrahim Foundation in 2006, Ibrahim was employed by British Telecom and later worked as the technical director for Cellnet (now O2), a subsidiary of British Telecom, where he launched the first cellular network in the UK. In 1989 he founded MSI, a consultancy and software company, which in 2000 was bought by the Marconi Company.

In 1998, MSI spun off MSI-Cellular Investments, later renamed Celtel, as a mobile phone operator in Africa. Celtel was largely financed by equity rather than international banks, which were averse to investment in Africa at the time.

In 2004, Ibrahim announced that he planned to take Celtel public through the London Stock Exchange. Ibrahim and his team decided to sell Celtel in 2005 to Kuwait-based the Mobile Telecommunications Company (now Zain). At the time of sale, Celtel had over 24 million mobile phone subscribers in 14 African countries. The company had 4,000 employees, of whom 98 per cent were African. Mobile telephones have brought wide reaching economic and social benefits in Africa and Ibrahim was credited with "transforming a continent". In 2008, he was ranked first in the annual Powerlist of the most influential Black Britons.

Ibrahim is the funding chairman of Satya Capital Limited, a private investment firm primarily focused on Africa.

Since 2010, Ibrahim has lent his support to the Broadband Commission for Digital Development, a UN initiative that aims to spread the full benefits of broadband services to unconnected peoples.

== Mo Ibrahim Foundation ==
In 2006, Ibrahim founded the Mo Ibrahim Foundation, which is headquartered in London and Dakar. In 2007, the Foundation inaugurated the Mo Ibrahim Prize for Achievement in African Leadership, to recognise outstanding political leadership on the continent, with the first recipient former president Joaquim Chissano of Mozambique.

Nelson Mandela was named an Honorary Laureate in 2007. The Prize has been awarded a further five times, most recently in 2021 to former president of Niger, Mahamadou Issoufou.

Every two years, the Foundation publishes the Ibrahim Index of African Governance, which ranks the governance performance of all 54 African countries. The Foundation defines governance as "the provision of political, social and economic public goods and services that every citizen has the right to expect from their government, and that a government has the responsibility to deliver to its citizens."

The Foundation hosts a biennial event, the Ibrahim Governance Weekend (IGW), which brings together prominent players from across Africa and globally, to discuss issues of importance to Africa's progress.

The Foundation offers scholarships at University of Birmingham, SOAS, and London Business School. These scholarships are on topics of International Development at University of Birmingham, Governance of Development in Africa at SOAS, and an MBA at London Business School. The scholarships are initiated for African students, both master students and postgraduates.

== Other activities ==
Ibrahim contributes to the leadership and activities of numerous other organisations, including the B Team, Council on Foreign Relations, Commission on State Fragility, Global Alliance Foundation, ONE, Open Government Partnership, School of Transnational Governance at the European University Institute, the World Bank ID4D, Crisis Group and the World Justice Project.

Ibrahim is the co-founder and co-chair of the Africa-Europe Foundation, which was established in 2020 to strengthen Africa-Europe relations.

Ibrahim has been a member of the Africa Regional Advisory Board of London Business School and on the board of trustees of the American University of Cairo

== Awards and honours ==
Ibrahim has received multiple awards in recognition of his business and philanthropic activities, including: the GSM Association Chairman’s Award for Lifetime Achievement (2007), The Economist Innovation Award for Social and Economic Innovation (2007), the BNP Paribas Prize for Philanthropy (2008), the Clinton Global Citizen Award (2010), the Eisenhower Medal for Distinguished Leadership and Service (2014), the Foreign Policy Association Medal (2014) and the David Rockefeller Bridging Leadership Award (2012, 2017).

He was made Commander of the Order of the Lion by President Macky Sall of Senegal (2014) and Commander of the Wissam Arch by King Mohammed VI of Morocco (2014).

Ibrahim has been featured in Time magazine's 100 Most Influential People in the World (2008), the New African's list of Most Influential Africans (2014), Bloomberg Market's 50 Most Influential (2015), and the Jeune Afrique list of 100 Most Influential Africans (2019). He is a member of the Hall of Fame for the Powerlist of influential black Britons.

Ibrahim has received honorary degrees, doctorates and fellowships from a range of academic institutions, including the University of Birmingham, Bradford University, Cornell University, De Montfort University, Imperial College London, London Business School, the University of Oxford, Royal Academy of Engineering, SOAS University of London, University of Pennsylvania, and Lancaster University.

Ibrahim was appointed Knight Commander of the Order of St Michael and St George (KCMG) in the 2023 New Year Honours for services to charity and philanthropy.

== Personal life ==
In 1973, Ibrahim married Hania Morsi Fadl, an Alexandria University graduate from the year above him, whom he had known since childhood. They are now divorced. Fadl is a Sudanese-born British radiologist, running the only breast cancer clinic in Sudan.

They have two children, Hosh Ibrahim and Hadeel Ibrahim. Hadeel Ibrahim was a board member of the Clinton Foundation.

Ibrahim is married to Jane Ibrahim. They have a son, Sami Ibrahim.

Ibrahim resides between London and Monaco.
