= David Ellis (consultant) =

American consultant

David Wertz Ellis

President and Director of the Museum of Science (Boston)
- In office 1990–2002
- Succeeded by: Jane Pickering

President of Lafayette College
- In office 1978–1990
- Preceded by: K. Roald Bergethon
- Succeeded by: Robert I. Rotberg

Personal details
- Born: February 8, 1936 (age 90) Huntingdon, Pennsylvania, US
- Spouse: Marion Elizabeth Schmitt
- Education: Haverford College (B.A.); MIT (Ph.D)
- Occupation: Management consulting
- Awards: Albert Nelson Marquis Lifetime Achievement Award, 2018

David Wertz Ellis (born February 8, 1936) is an American consultant who previously worked as the president and director of the Museum of Science (Boston), interim president of the Boston Children's Museum, and the president of Lafayette College. Since 2002, he has worked in the greater Boston area as a non-profit organization management consultant working mostly with museums and science centers.

In 2018, Ellis was presented with the Albert Nelson Marquis Lifetime Achievement Award by Marquis Who's Who.

== Early life ==
Ellis was born in Huntingdon, Pennsylvania, to parents Calvert Nice and Elizabeth Oller Ellis (née Wertz). His father was at one time the president of Juniata College. He attended Haverford College and graduated with a bachelor's degree in chemistry in 1958. He then went on to pursue his PhD at the Massachusetts Institute of Technology, where he graduated in 1962.

== Career ==
Ellis began his career working as an assistant professor of chemistry at the University of New Hampshire, a position he held from 1962 to 1967. For the next 11 years he held a variety of faculty and administrative at the university, his last position being vice provost for academic affairs, which he held from 1971 to 1978.

On March 4, 1978, Ellis was selected by the trustees of Lafayette College to become the school's 13th president. He was inaugurated on October 20 of that year and subsequently received letters of advice from many individuals, including president Jimmy Carter who wrote, "you bring to Lafayette an admirable leadership ability and a special sensitivity to the challenges now facing American higher education... I wish you a long and successful administration." In October 1981, Ellis mounted a $50 million fundraising campaign which was met by June 30, 1985. The money raised in this effort went largely towards the construction of several buildings on campus, one of which being a $16 million student center which required a controversial removal of a pre-World War 1 fraternity house. Also while president, Ellis helped form the Colonial League (now known as the Patriot League) with help from the president of Lehigh University. Ellis left the Lafayette presidency in 1990. Under his administration the college endowment grew from slightly under $50 million to $202 million. A trustee of the college claimed, "he has raised more money than any other president of the college - more, probably, than all his predecessors combined."

In 1989, Ellis attended a six-week Advanced Management Program at Harvard Business School, and the following year became the president and director of the Museum of Science in Boston, Massachusetts. He worked at the museum from 1990 to 2002, and after retirement was an interim director of the Harvard Museum of Natural History, and interim president of the Boston Children's Museum.

== Honors and awards ==
In 2018, Ellis was the recipient of the Marquis Who's Who Albert Nelson Marquis Lifetime Achievement Award.

He has also been the recipient of many honorary degrees:

- Honorary Doctor of Science, Northeastern University
- Honorary Doctor of Civil Law, The University of the South
- Honorary Doctor of Laws, Lafayette College
- Honorary Doctor of Humane Letters, Juniata College
- Honorary Doctor of Science, Ursinus College
- Honorary Doctor of Science, Susquehanna University
- Honorary Doctor of Laws, Lehigh University

== Works cited ==
- Gendebien, Albert W. (1986). The Biography of a college: A History of Lafayette College 1927 - 1978. Easton, PA: Lafayette College.

Academic offices
Preceded by K. Roald Bergethon	President of Lafayette College; 1978–1990	Succeeded by Robert I. Rotberg
