= Michelle Kosilek =

American murderer

Michelle Lynne Kosilek
- Born: Robert Kosilek; April 10, 1949; Chicago, Illinois, U.S.
- Known for: Lawsuits to obtain treatment for gender dysphoria, while in prison
- Spouse: Cheryl McCaul (m. 1983; murdered 1990)
- Status: Incarcarated
- Conviction: Murder
- Penalty: Life imprisonment without the possibility of parole

Details
- Imprisoned at: Massachusetts Correctional Institution at Norfolk

Michelle Lynne Kosilek (born April 10, 1949) is an American convicted murderer. Kosilek was convicted of the 1990 murder of wife Cheryl McCaul and sentenced to life in prison. While incarcerated, Kosilek became the first person to access gender-affirming care while incarcerated, by suing the Massachusetts Department of Correction (MDOC).

== Early life ==
Kosilek, given the birth name Robert, was born in Chicago, Illinois in 1949. In 1952, she and her older sister were abandoned by their alcoholic mother, while their father was serving a lengthy prison sentence for mail fraud. The siblings were raised in an orphanage run by the Catholic Church at St. Hedwig’s Parish, where Kosilek was reportedly punished by staff for cross-dressing. Their mother returned to take them back in 1959. Kosilek later told a journalist that, starting at age ten, she was repeatedly raped by her maternal grandfather, and began abusing alcohol. She also related that, on one occasion, she showed her breasts, which were swollen due to gynecomastia, to her mother. Her stepfather became infuriated by this, shattered a window in a rage, and stabbed Kosilek with a broken piece of glass, before her mother beat her with a frying pan.

Kosilek eventually ran away from home as a teenager, simultaneously dropping out of high school. While living on the streets, she developed an addiction to heroin and resorted to earning money by committing burglary, shoplifting, and engaging in child prostitution. As a young adult, Kosilek worked several jobs, including as a dishwasher, a truck driver, a garbage collector, a construction worker, a furniture restorer, a warehouse manager, a packer at a condiment factory and a school bus driver. as then as a private in the U.S. Army, before being discharged for going AWOL and cross-dressing.

=== Transgender identity ===
According to Kosilek, she had experienced dysphoria since she was age three, and she first developed the desire to transition after seeing a magazine featuring Christine Jorgensen, the first American to undergo gender-affirming surgery.

From 1967 to 1968, starting when Kosilek was about 18 years old, a doctor allegedly exploited Kosilek's difficulty in obtaining medical treatment for her gender dysphoria by providing hormone therapy for Kosilek in exchange for sex. Kosilek later said that, while she was on hormone therapy, she "felt normal" for the first time in her life. Kosilek also took hormones for several months in 1971 and 1972, but abruptly stopped each time, first after she was gang raped by fellow inmates while serving time for drug possession and robbery, and the second time when she was assaulted at a gay bar by two patrons, who disagreed with her plans to transition to female.

== Relationship with Cheryl McCaul ==
After relapsing into drug abuse, Kosilek entered a drug rehabilitation facility for addiction treatment in 1983, where Kosilek met Cheryl McCaul, who was working there as a volunteer counselor. McCaul was a divorcee with two children and believed that if she were to marry Kosilek, that Kosilek would identify as a man; Kosilek recalled McCaul saying that all Kosilek needed was "a good woman". They were married in 1984, but Kosilek's female gender identity did not change. Kosilek later commented that she believes that she had been "seduced" by McCaul.

== Murder of Cheryl McCaul ==
Kosilek murdered McCaul in May, 1990. On the day of the murder, McCaul had returned home to the couple's condominium in Mansfield, Massachusetts, and discovered Kosilek wearing McCaul's clothing. Kosilek claimed that the female clothing of Kosilek stirred McCaul with transphobic rage, leading McCaul to throw boiling tea at Kosilek's face, causing Kosilek to knock McCaul down. Kosilek said that McCaul then grabbed a butcher's knife and chased Kosilek into another room, threatening to kill her. Kosilek said she picked up a piece of wire that had been on a table, and that the next thing she remembered was awakening, days later, in the psychiatric unit of a hospital. Kosilek gave a series of recorded interviews to a reporter in October 1992. Kosilek stated that she "probably, because of the trauma of it ... went into a blackout at that moment." while committing the murder, adding: "Apparently, I did take her life. It was probably in self-defense". McCaul was 36 years old when she died.

=== Discovery of the body ===
On May 20, 1990, Cheryl McCaul's body was discovered in the back seat of her car. Her car was found in the parking lot of the Emerald Square Mall in North Attleborough, after the mall had closed for the night. McCaul's body was nude, and she had died by strangulation. Kosilek had strangled her with a rope and with a piece of piano wire, pulling so tightly that McCaul was nearly decapitated.

=== Investigation and arrest ===
That evening, Kosilek called the North Attleborough police department, stated that her wife Cheryl had not come home that evening, and asked whether there had been any report of a car accident in which she might have been involved. The police told Kosilek that they had found Cheryl's car, and they asked Kosilek to come to the police station. Kosilek agreed, requesting that an officer pick her up.

Kosilek was twice taken in for questioning, once that day, and once on Monday, May 21. During this second visit, the police informed Kosilek that she was a suspect in the murder, and that they had spoken with her step-son, Timothy. Kosilek informed the police that she was going to get a lawyer, and left.

Later that evening, on May 22, 1990, shortly after midnight, Kosilek crashed her car in Bedford. Police observed Kosilek in the driver's seat, dressed in women's clothing, having crashed into a stop sign and some bushes. The officer administered field sobriety tests, determined that Kosilek was not intoxicated, and called her a cab. On May 24, while being stopped for speeding, Kosilek asked the officer for psychiatric services, and was transported to the psychiatric unit of a New York hospital, and subsequently was brought back to Massachusetts by the Massachusetts State Police.

=== Trial and conviction ===
Kosilek was indicted for murder on May 30, 1990. After unsuccessfully contesting her extradition from New York where she had been apprehended, she pleaded not guilty on October 3 and was ordered held without bail. In November 1992, while awaiting trial, she ran a write-in campaign for the office of Bristol County Sheriff after unsuccessfully suing the current sheriff for violations of her civil rights by "the denial of medically prescribed treatment for ... gender dysphoria." Also while awaiting trial, she took female hormones in the form of birth control pills, twice attempted suicide, and once attempted self-castration.

The trial began on January 14, 1993, with jury selection at which no potential juror expressed any difficulty with the judge's statement that "the defendant is physically a male but may emotionally and psychologically be a female, and will be wearing what may be described as female clothing and may exhibit mannerisms and behavior considered to be female or that he may be referred to by female pronouns." At trial, Kosilek's attorney did not dispute that Kosilek strangled McCaul, but said Kosilek had no memory of the events because of a four-day blackout that began shortly before the killing. She said: "My client [Kosilek] now believes, though [Kosilek] has no memory of this, that [Kosilek] must have been the one to use that wire in self defense." The prosecution described how Kosilek hid McCaul's body, tried to disguise McCaul's death as "a sex crime", and fled to New York.

During the court proceedings, a cab driver testified that he had picked up Kosilek from that same mall, on that same afternoon, and had driven her to a store located about half a mile from her house in Mansfield.

Kosilek's step-son, Timothy, who was 15 years old at the time of the murder, testified that that evening, Kosilek had cooked steak for their dinner, and that they had talked about everyday things. Timothy also stated that Kosilek shaved off her beard on the day of the killing, the first time she had done so in at least a year.

Kosilek was convicted of first degree murder of McCaul and sentenced to life in prison without the possibility of parole.

On appeal, the Massachusetts Supreme Judicial Court ruled on August 8, 1996, that the trial judge's errors were insufficient to overturn the conviction.

== Incarceration and medical lawsuits ==
Kosilek is incarcerated in Framingham, Massachusetts, at the Massachusetts Correctional Institution at Framingham, a medium security female prison. Kosilek has been diagnosed with gender dysphoria and identifies as female. While in prison, Kosilek has presented herself as a woman, as one court decision later said, "to the maximum extent possible", and had her first and middle names legally changed to Michelle Lynne.

=== Lawsuits ===
- In 2000, Kosilek sued the Massachusetts Department of Corrections (MDOC), claiming "violation of rights" under the Eighth Amendment. Kosilek won that suit in 2002 and obtained hormone replacement therapy and psychotherapy for her condition.
- Kosilek briefly received electrolysis treatments in 2008.
- In 2009, Kosilek lost her eighth lawsuit, attempting to force the DOC to provide electrolysis to remove facial hair.

=== Sex reassignment surgery ===
In May 2006, Kosilek sued the DOC, arguing that its refusal to provide sex reassignment surgery constituted "cruel and unusual punishment" under the Eighth Amendment.

On September 4, 2012, U.S. District Judge Mark Wolf ruled that the MDOC had violated Kosilek's constitutional rights by denying sex reassignment surgery, noting that former Corrections Commissioner Kathleen Dennehy had engaged in "pretense, pretext, and prevarication" to deny the treatment. He wrote that Dennehy had "testified untruthfully on many matters" while supporting legislation to prevent him from providing sex reassignment surgery to inmates. Wolf ordered the DOC to provide Kosilek with the surgery. In October 2012, Judge Wolf ordered the DOC to hire an independent expert to determine whether electrolysis was a necessary part of Kosilek's treatment for gender dysphoria. Judge Wolf announced in December that, pending the outcome of the case on appeal, he was prepared to require the state to reimburse Koselek's attorneys for their work on the case, estimated at more than $700,000. Kosilek's attorneys offered to forgo that payment if the state would cover the cost of Kosilek's surgery and forgo its appeal.

Congressman Barney Frank, who was gay, supported the decision of Massachusetts Governor Deval Patrick to appeal Wolf's decision. He said "I think it should be clear he has a right to present himself as a woman, and that should be honored by the prison system" but he thought that Kosilek's advocates were wrong to describe his case "as a general trans[gender rights] issue". U.S. Senator Scott Brown and his 2012 election opponent Elizabeth Warren both objected to the use of "taxpayer dollars" for Kosilek's surgery. Relatives of Cheryl McCaul objected to the court-ordered surgery and one cousin suggested it would lead someone unable to afford such surgery to commit murder in order to receive it at government expense.

In 2006, the editors of the Boston Globe had opposed Kosilek's surgery because "[p]rivate insurers rarely pay for sex-change operations" and "hormone treatment and expert therapy" are "sufficient". In 2012, the Globe said that Wolf's decision made a persuasive case that the surgery was "medically necessary, not an elective procedure", however "distasteful". The paper had also stopped deadnaming Kosilek by her birth name "Robert" and adopted feminine pronouns. An editorial in the Los Angeles Times noted that cost was not the issue, since the cost of the surgery would be offset by the lesser expense of housing Kosilek in a women's prison and avoid the costs associated with Kosilek's attacks on her own body. It nevertheless thought that sex reassignment surgery was "medical attention that is above and beyond the community standard of care", noting that private insurance companies and Medicare do not cover it. It offered the "generally recognized standard of insurance coverage" as the standard to be used in providing medical services to the incarcerated.

The DOC appealed Wolf's decision about sex reassignment surgery, Kosilek v. Spencer, to the First Circuit Court of Appeals, which heard arguments on April 2, 2013. On January 17, 2014, a three-judge panel of that Court ruled 2–1 for Kosilek. The majority, Judges O. Rogeriee Thompson and William J. Kayatta, Jr., said that Kosilek's Eighth Amendment rights included "receiving medically necessary treatment ... even if that treatment strikes some as odd or unorthodox". In dissent Judge Juan R. Torruella said that denying the medical care in question did not violate Kosilek's Eighth Amendment rights because it did not "fall below society's minimum standards of decency" and "illustrate{d} neither an intent to harm nor the obstinate and unwarranted application of clearly imprudent care". However, the full First Circuit Court ruled against Kosilek 3–2 in December 2014. In May 2015, after continued litigation and appeals, the Supreme Court chose not to hear the appeal, and by doing so denied Kosilek's request for sex reassignment surgery.

== Personal life ==
In January 2012, Kosilek self-published an autobiography while serving time in prison, Grace's Daughter.

== See also ==
- Beate Schmidt
- Skylar Deleon
- LGBT people in prison

== Additional sources ==
- Nathaniel Penn, "Should This Inmate Get a State-Financed Sex Change Operation?", New Republic, October 30, 2013
- James Phillips, "Gender Identity Disorder in Prison: Depending on a Diagnosis That Is Soon to Disappear?", Psychiatric Times, September 28, 2012
- Jennifer Levi "Transgender Exceptionalism Should Not Cloud Legal Analysis," Jurist, October 16, 2012
