= Robert I. Rotberg =

American academic

Robert Irwin Rotberg
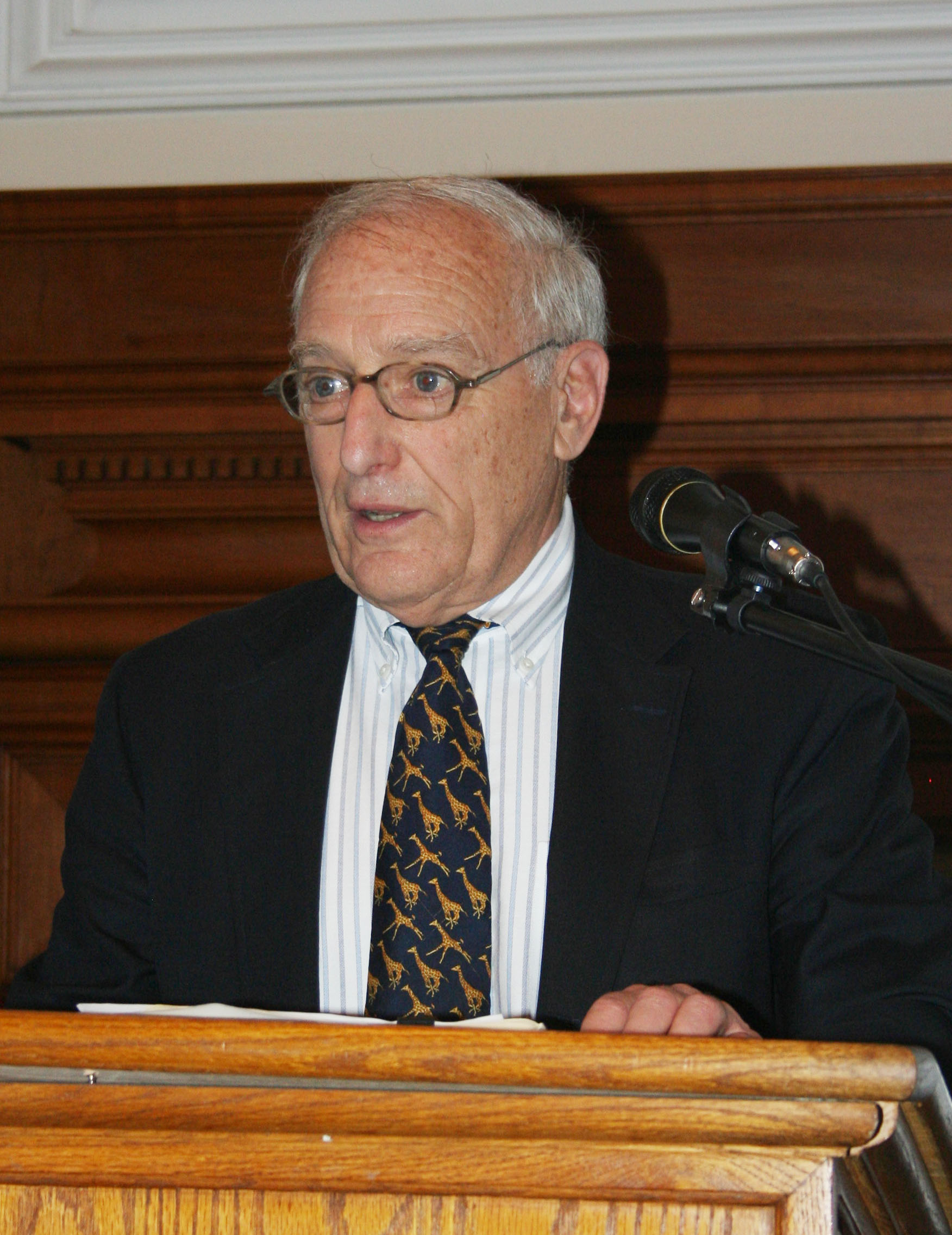
- Born: April 11, 1935 (age 91)

Education
- Education: Oberlin College (B.A.); Oxford University (Ph.D.); Princeton University (Graduate studies)

Philosophical work
- Main interests: International relations theory

Robert Irwin Rotberg (born April 11, 1935) is an academic from the United States who served as President of the World Peace Foundation (1993–2010). A professor in governance and foreign affairs, he was director of the Program on Intrastate Conflict, Conflict Prevention, and Conflict Resolution at Harvard University's John F. Kennedy School of Government (1999–2010), and has served in administrative positions at Tufts University and Lafayette College.

In 2003–2004, he served as a member of the Secretary of State's Advisory Panel on Africa, and was a Presidential appointee to the Council of the National Endowment for the Humanities. In 2007 at the Kennedy School, he directed the establishment of the Index for African Governance, to help evaluate leaders for the Mo Ibrahim Prize for Achievement in African Leadership, awarded annually by the Mo Ibrahim Foundation. A trustee of Oberlin College, Rotberg is a visiting professor at the College of Europe in Bruges, Belgium. In 2013 Rotberg became the Fulbright Research Chair in Political Development at the Balsillie School of International Affairs in Waterloo, Ontario, Canada.

== Early life and education ==
Rotberg earned his undergraduate degree in history at Oberlin College in 1955. He obtained his doctorate at St Antony's College, Oxford University while on a Rhodes Scholarship. He also did graduate studies at Princeton University.

== Career ==
His academic career in United States institutions has included Professor of Political Science and History, MIT; Academic Vice President of Tufts University; and President of Lafayette College. In 1970, he was a founding co-editor of the Journal of Interdisciplinary History and continues in that position. At the turn of the twentieth century, Rotberg was director of the Program on Intrastate Conflict, Conflict Prevention, and Conflict Resolution (1999–2010) at Harvard University's John F. Kennedy School of Government. He was director of the World Peace Foundation from 1993 to 2010 and later given the title of emeritus president.

In 2014, Rotberg was defeated by Suzie Barry in his bid to become Selectman of Lexington, Massachusetts.

In February 2016, he crafted local legislation that would "prohibit the manufacture, sale, ownership, or possession of assault weapons and high capacity ammunition magazines in the Town of Lexington". This measure was unanimously opposed by the town's Board of Selectmen, Chief of Police, and Town Counsel.

== Bibliography ==
Rotberg is the author and editor of numerous books and articles on US foreign policy, Africa, Asia, and the Caribbean, most recently:

- Africa Emerges (2013)
- Transformative Political Leadership: Making a Difference in the Developing World (2012)
- Worst of the Worst: Dealing with Repressive and Rogue Nations (2007)
- A Leadership for Peace: How Edwin Ginn Tried to Change the World (2007)
- Building a New Afghanistan (2007)
- Governance and Leadership in Africa (2007)
- Israeli And Palestinian Narratives of Conflict: History's Double Helix (2006)
- Battling Terrorism in the Horn of Africa (2005)
- When States Fail: Causes and Consequences (2004)
  - The Failure and Collapse of Nation-States: Breakdown, Prevention, and Repair (PDF; 690 KB)
- State Failure and State Weakness in a Time of Terror (2003)
  - Failed States, Collapsed States, Weak States: Causes and Indicators (PDF; 90 KB)
- Ending Autocracy, Enabling Democracy: The Tribulations of Southern Africa 1960–2000 (2002)
- Peacekeeping and Peace Enforcement in Africa: Methods of Conflict Prevention (2001)
- Truth v. Justice: The Morality of Truth Commissions (2000)
- Creating Peace in Sri Lanka: Civil War and Reconciliation (1999)
- Burma: Prospects for a Democratic Future (1998)
- War and Peace in Southern Africa: Crime, Drugs, Armies, and Trade (1998)
- Haiti Renewed: Political and Economic Prospects (1997)
- Vigilance and Vengeance: NGOs Preventing Ethnic Conflict in Divided Societies (1996)
- From Massacres to Genocide: The Media, Public Policy and Humanitarian Crises (1996)
- The Founder: Cecil Rhodes and the Pursuit of Power (1988, new ed. 2002)
- Africa and its Explorers: Motives, Methods and Impacts (editor, 1970)
- Christian Missions and the Creation of Northern Rhodesia (1965)
- The Rise of Nationalism in Central Africa (1965)

== Index of African Governance ==
Under the direction of Professor Rotberg and supported by the Mo Ibrahim Foundation, an Index of African Governance was created in 2007. It ranks all 48 sub-Saharan African countries according to quality of governance. In conjunction, Mo Ibrahim has created the Ibrahim Prize for Achievement in African Leadership, a prize larger in monetary value than the Nobel Prize and thought to be the largest monetary prize awarded worldwide at $5 million initial payment plus an additional $200,000 per year for the lifetime of the recipient.

The results of the Index, which since 2009 has been compiled by African researchers and institutions, will help the Ibrahim Prize selection committee choose winners. The Prize will provide recognition, awards and pensions for "honest, capable African heads of state" after they leave office. Awards were made in 2007 and 2008.

Academic offices
| Preceded by David Ellis | President of Lafayette College; 1990–1993 | Succeeded by Arthur J. Rothkopf |
