= Indira Talwani =

American federal judge (born 1960)

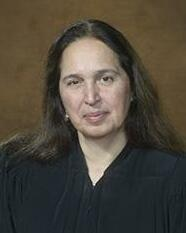

Judge of the United States District Court for the District of Massachusetts
- Incumbent
- Assumed office May 12, 2014
- Appointed by: Barack Obama
- Preceded by: Mark L. Wolf

Personal details
- Born: 1960 (age 65–66) Englewood, New Jersey, U.S.
- Education: Radcliffe College (BA); University of California, Berkeley (JD)

Indira Talwani (born October 6, 1960) is an American lawyer and jurist serving as a U.S. district judge of the United States District Court for the District of Massachusetts. She was appointed in 2014 by President Barack Obama.

== Biography ==
Talwani graduated from Phillips Exeter Academy in 1978 and received a Bachelor of Arts degree, cum laude, in 1982 from Radcliffe College. She received a Juris Doctor in 1988 from UC Berkeley School of Law, graduating Order of the Coif.

Talwani began her legal career as a law clerk to Judge Stanley Alexander Weigel of the United States District Court for the Northern District of California, from 1988 to 1989. She served as an associate at the San Francisco, California, law firm of Altshuler Berzon LLP, from 1989 to 1995 and as a partner at that law firm, from 1996 to 1999. From 1999 to 2014, she served as a partner at the Boston, Massachusetts, law firm of Segal Roitman LLP, where she focused her practice on civil litigation at the state and federal trial court and appellate levels.

=== Federal judicial service ===
On September 24, 2013, President Barack Obama nominated Talwani to serve as a United States district judge of the United States District Court for the District of Massachusetts, to the seat vacated by Judge Mark L. Wolf, who assumed senior status on January 1, 2013. On February 6, 2014, her nomination was reported out of committee. Cloture was filed on her nomination on May 6, 2014. On May 8, 2014, the Senate invoked cloture on her nomination by a 55–41 vote. Later that day, her nomination was confirmed by a 94–0 vote. She received her judicial commission on May 12, 2014.

Talwani presided over the sentencing of many parents involved in the Operation Varsity Blues college admissions scandal, including actress Felicity Huffman. Talwani sentenced Huffman to 14 days in prison, 1 year supervised release, a $30,000 fine, and 250 hours of community service after Huffman pleaded guilty to conspiracy to commit mail fraud, and honest services mail fraud for her role in the scandal. Huffman served 11 out of her 14 days.

On July 28, 2025, Talwani ordered the Trump administration to continue Medicaid funding for Planned Parenthood, blocking enforcement of that provision of the "One Big Beautiful Bill" signed earlier that month. Talwani's ruling kept Planned Parenthood funded for six weeks, until the 1st Circuit permitted the Trump administration to end Planned Parenthood funding in September.

Talwani blocked Trump administration from revoking immigration parole by issuing a temporary restraining order that extends the “family reunification parole” status of immigrants who were set to see it expire on January 14, 2026 as part of the administration’s broad crackdown on immigration.

On June 25, 2026 Talwani blocked Trump's attempt to force individual States to release their voting rolls, using the post office to threaten to refuse delivery of votes by mail. In a 37 page ruling she stated that "The Constitution does not grant the President any specific powers over elections".

On July 17, 2026 Talwani ruled that the Office of Management and Budget and the Trump administration can’t change grant terms after the fact, and can't use an obscure clause relating to agency priorities to make billions of dollars in funding cuts. She granted a summary judgment preventing the administration from relying on the clause to make cuts and denied a motion by the government to dismiss the case.

On August 28, 2026 Talwani issued a Temporary Restraining Order to pause the Trump administration plan to control the delivery of mail-in ballots pursuant to Executive Order 14399. On September 14, 2026, the Supreme Court declined to lift Talwani's stay, meaning the Trump administration's executive order will not take effect for the 2026 midterm elections.

== See also ==
- List of Asian American jurists
- List of first women lawyers and judges in Massachusetts

Legal offices
Preceded by Mark L. Wolf	Judge of the United States District Court for the District of Massachusetts; 2014–present	Incumbent
