= K. Roald Bergethon =

American academic administrator (1918–2004)

- Born: June 18, 1918; Tromso Norway
- Died: December 17, 2004 (aged 86); Bethlehem, Pennsylvania, US
- Citizenship: American
- Education: DePauw University, B.A. Cornell University, M.A., Ph.D.
- Occupations: College president and academic
- Years active: 1945 to 1988
- Employer(s): Brown University; Lafayette College; New England College

K. Roald Bergethon (June 18, 1918 – December 17, 2004) was a Norwegian-American academic administrator. He was president of the Lafayette College for twenty years. He was also president of New England College and a dean of the college at Brown University.

== Early life ==
Bergethon was born on June 18, 1918 in Tromso, Norway. His parents were Petra Ruud-Olsen and Maximillian Bergethon, Baptist minister. When he was eight years old in 1926, he came to the United States and went to school in New York City. He became a naturalized U.S. citizen in 1930. In 1932, he returned to Norway to attend high school.

Bergethon returned to the United States when he was sixteen years old and enrolled in DePauw University, graduating with a Bachelor of Arts degree. Bergethon the attended Cornell University, graduating with a Master of Arts and an Ph.D.

During World War II, Bergethon oversaw the construction of military installations. In 1943, he received the Meritorious Civilian Service Award.

== Career ==
In 1945, Bergethon became an instructor at Brown University. He was promoted to assistant professor of German in 1947 and associate professor in 1953. Bergethon was the author of Grammar for Reading German, published in 1950, with revised editions in 1963 and 1974. He became acting dean of the college at Brown University in 1956, leaving in 1958 when he became president of Lafayette College.

At Lafayette College, Bergethon oversaw the transition from all-male to coed and the admission of the first African American student. During his tenure, the college's endowment grew from $20 million to $50 million. He retired as president emeritus in 1978.

Bergethon was the interim president and president of New England College from 1981 to 1985. He was interim president of Bloomfield College from 1986 to 1987 and of Wells College from 1987 to 1988. He was president of the Presbyterian College Union, the Middle States Association of Colleges and Secondary Schools, and the Pennsylvania Association of Colleges and Universities.

== Personal life ==
Bergethon married Katherine Lind. They had two sons.

Bergethon was a member of Beta Theta Pi and an honorary member of Alpha Phi Omega. He was a board member of the Delaware Valley Area Council of the Boy Scouts of America, the Charlotte W. Newcombe Foundation, the Greater Lehigh Valley Hospital and Health Planning Council, the Lehigh-Delaware Development Council, the Northampton County Community Council, the United Fund of Easton, and WLVT-TV.

Bergethon died in Easton Hospital on December 17, 2004, in Bethlehem, Pennsylvania.
