= Ibrahim Prize =

Annual prize awarded to former African heads of state for respect of democracy

The Ibrahim Prize
- Awarded for: Excellence in African leadership
- Sponsored by: Mo Ibrahim Foundation
- Presented by: Independent Prize Committee
- Reward: $5 million
- Established: 2007
- Final award: 2020
- Website: moibrahimfoundation.org

The Ibrahim Prize for Achievement in African Leadership, also known as the Ibrahim Prize, is an annual prize awarded to a former African executive head of state or government on criteria of good governance, democratic election and respect of terms limits. Since its inception, the Prize has been awarded 7 times. It has often not been offered, with no leader being found worthy of the award on a given year.

== Background ==
Established by the Mo Ibrahim Foundation in 2007, the Ibrahim Prize celebrates excellence in African leadership. It is awarded to a former Executive Head of State or Government by an independent Prize Committee composed of eminent figures, including two Nobel Laureates. Prize winners are referred to as Ibrahim Laureates.

The Ibrahim Prize

- Recognises and celebrates African leaders who have developed their countries, lifted people out of poverty and paved the way for sustainable and equitable prosperity
- Highlights exceptional role models for the continent
- Ensures that Africa continues to benefit from the experience and expertise of exceptional leaders when they leave national office, by enabling them to continue in other public roles on the continent

Criteria

- Former African head of government
- Left office in the last three years
- Democratically elected
- Served their constitutionally mandated term
- Demonstrated exceptional leadership

=== Award ===
Prize recipients are awarded US$5 million, divided into annual instalments of US$500,000 paid out over 10 years, followed by US$200,000 annually, thereafter.

With a US$5 million payment, the Ibrahim Prize, is believed to be the world's largest, exceeding the $1.5m Nobel Peace Prize. Former South African President Nelson Mandela, former United States President Bill Clinton, and former United Nations Secretary-General Kofi Annan are among those who have welcomed the initiative.

The Ibrahim Prize for Achievement in African Leadership has been awarded in 2007, 2008, 2011, 2014, 2017 and 2020. Former South African president Nelson Mandela was named an honorary laureate in 2007. Desmond Tutu was awarded a Special Prize for speaking truth to power in 2012.

== Prize Committee ==
- Festus Mogae (Chair), former President of Botswana
- Aicha Bah Diallo, former Education Minister of Guinea
- Mohamed ElBaradei, Director General Emeritus, International Atomic Energy Agency
- Horst Köhler, former President of Germany
- Graça Machel, Former Education Minister of Mozambique
- Mary Robinson, former President of Ireland

Former Committee Chairs:

- Kofi Annan (2007-2011), former Secretary-General of the United Nations
- Salim Ahmed Salim (2007-2020), former Prime Minister of Tanzania and Secretary General of the Organisation of African Unity

Former Committee members:

- Ngozi Okonjo-Iweala (2007-2008), Director-General of the World Trade Organization and former Finance Minister of Nigeria
- Martti Ahtisaari (2007-2019), former President of Finland

== Laureates ==
Year	Laureate	Country	Rationale
2007	Joaquim Chissano	Mozambique	"President Chissano's achievements in bringing peace, reconciliation, stable democracy and economic progress to his country greatly impressed the committee."
2007	Nelson Mandela (honorary)	South Africa	"Nelson Mandela stands as an inspiration, in South Africa and throughout the world, to all who share his devotion to democracy and equality. In presenting this Laureate, the Foundation would like to celebrate his extraordinary achievements and support the important work of the foundations he established."
2008	Festus Mogae	Botswana	"President Mogae's outstanding leadership has ensured Botswana's continued stability and prosperity in the face of an HIV/AIDS pandemic which threatened the future of his country and people."
2009	No award given		
2010	No award given		
2011	Pedro Pires	Cabo Verde	"The prize committee ha[d] been greatly impressed by President Pedro Pires's vision in transforming Cape Verde into a model of democracy, stability, and increased prosperity." and, "President Pires embodies the type of leadership the prize is designed to recognise."
2012	No award given		
2013	No award given		
2014	Hifikepunye Pohamba	Namibia	"President Pohamba's focus on forging national cohesion and reconciliation at a key stage of Namibia's consolidation of democracy and social and economic development impressed the committee" and, "During the decade of Hifikepunye Pohamba's Presidency, Namibia's reputation has been cemented as a well-governed, stable and inclusive democracy with strong media freedom and respect for human rights."
2015	No award given		
2016	No award given		
2017	Ellen Johnson Sirleaf	Liberia	"Ellen Johnson Sirleaf took the helm of Liberia when it was completely destroyed by civil war and led a process of reconciliation that focused on building a nation and its democratic institutions. In very difficult circumstances, she helped guide her nation towards a peaceful and democratic future, paving the way for her successor to follow."
2018	No award given		
2019	No award given		
2020	Mahamadou Issoufou	Niger	"For his efforts to economic development of his country while working for regional stability, as well as his engagement to limit himself to two terms, leading to the first ever democratic transition of power in Niger. In the face of the most severe political and economic issues, President Issoufou has led his people on a path of progress."
2021	No award given		
2022	No award given		
2023	No award given		
2024	No award given		

== See also ==
- List of awards for contributions to society
