= Ibrahim Index of African Governance =

Annual assessment of African countries

2016 Edition of the Ibrahim Index on African Governance

The Ibrahim Index of African Governance (IIAG), established in 2007, provides an assessment of the quality of governance in African countries. The most recent published edition, the 2024 IIAG, comprises 96 indicators constructed from 322 variables collected from data publications produced by 49 independent African and international data sources. Published every two years, the IIAG is one of the world’s most comprehensive collections of data on African governance.

The IIAG provides a framework for citizens, governments, institutions, academics and business to assess the delivery of public goods and services, and policy outcomes, across Africa.

The Foundation defines governance as the provision of the political, social, economic and environmental goods that a citizen has the right to expect from their state, and that a state has the responsibility to deliver to its citizens. The IIAG assesses progress under four main conceptual categories: Security & Rule of Law, Participation, Rights & Inclusion, Foundations for Economic Opportunity, and Human Development.

Scholars, development professionals, analysts, and policymakers have used the IIAG to benchmark governance performance across a number of dimensions at national, regional and continental levels. Scores and ranks are available for the latest 10-year period, enabling the analysis of trends over time. All underlying data used in the construction of the IIAG is freely available and transparently published alongside a comprehensive methodology.

== History ==
The Ibrahim Index of African Governance (IIAG) is a key initiative of the Mo Ibrahim Foundation that was first published in 2007. The most recent iteration, the 2024 IIAG, was published on October 2024 and covers the period 2014-2023.

The index was initially produced in association with Harvard University; academic and technical assistance has subsequently been provided by a range of African academics and research bodies.

The IIAG is published every two years and receives extensive media attention from across the African continent and in the international media. The Ibrahim Index has been used by civil society and government bodies across the continent to monitor governance. One example is in, where political opponents of President Uhuru Kenyatta used the 2022 IIAG to challenge his administration’s record on governance.

In 2007, critics suggested that the IIAG was limited by its focus on the 48 Sub-Saharan African countries, ignoring Morocco, Algeria, Tunisia, Libya and Egypt. Aside from these five additions, the IIAG first included South Sudan, which became a separate country in 2011, in its 2015 iteration.

== Methodology ==
The Ibrahim Index of African Governance (IIAG) is a composite Index that is published every two years and provides a statistical measure of governance performance in 54 African countries.

The IIAG governance framework comprises four dimensions (categories):

- Security & Rule of Law
- Participation, Rights & Inclusion
- Foundations for Economic Opportunity
- Human Development

These categories are made up of 16 sub-categories, consisting of 96 indicators. The framework for the forthcoming 2026 IIAG consists of 319 underlying variables drawn from 59 datasets published by 50 sources and institutions.

The IIAG is refined and revised on a biannual basis to continually improve its measurement of governance. Improvements are a result of either methodological changes, or based on the inclusion of new data. Equally, if previously included measures undergo fundamental methodological changes or do not meet the criteria for inclusion anymore, it may be necessary to exclude them from future iterations. It is also necessary to update previously published data if retrospective revisions are made to data at source.

As a result of these changes, the entire IIAG dataset is re-calculated with each new iteration, in accordance with best practices. The retrospective revision means that score and rank comparisons between years should be made entirely within the latest available IIAG iteration.

Ahead of the 2020 IIAG, the structure of the Index was changed so that the vast majority of indicators are now composed of more than one single variable collected from source. This is based on the understanding that composite scores constitute the key value added of the IIAG dataset, and aims to provide a clearer, more complete and more stable framework.

=== How to read the results ===
The IIAG provides score, rank and 10-year trends for all governance measures included in the dataset, and these are available for each country, as well as for multinational groupings such as the continent, African geographical regions and Regional Economic Communities (RECs).

==== Scores ====
Each governance measure is given a score out of 100.0 to quantify a country’s performance for each data year. Scores are rounded to one decimal point and show each country’s performance in relation to the other 54 African countries.

==== Ranks ====
The 54 countries represented in the IIAG are ranked for each governance measure based on their respective scores and countries are sorted by performance. If two or more countries share the same score, they are given the same place in the ranking table.

==== 10-year trends ====
10-year trends offer additional insights into the scores and ranks by showing the change in score between the last and the first data years of the given period. For example, the 2022 IIAG 10-year trends compare each country’s performance for each governance measure in 2021 and 2012.

== Indicators ==
The framework for the forthcoming 2026 IIAG comprises 96 indicators, grouped into four broad categories: Security & Rule of Law, Participation, Rights & Inclusion, Foundations for Economic Opportunity, and Human Development. The Overall Governance score is arrived at by calculating the unweighted average of the four IIAG categories.

=== Security and Rule of Law ===
Scores on the safety and rule of law category based on report from 2009: 100 / 75 / 50; 25 / 0 / no data

The 25 indicators in the Security & Rule of Law category are divided into four sub-categories: Security & Safety, Rule of Law & Justice, Accountability & Transparency and Anti-Corruption.

The Security & Safety sub-category includes six indicators measuring Absence of Armed Conflict, Absence of Violence against Civilians, Absence of Forced Migration, Absence of Human Trafficking & Forced Labour, Absence of Crime and Public Perception of Security & Safety.

The Rule of Law & Justice sub-category includes seven indicators measuring Executive Compliance with the Rule of Law, Impartiality of the Judicial System, Judicial Process, Equality before the Law, Law Enforcement, Property Rights, and Public Perception of the Rule of Law

The Accountability & Transparency sub-category includes six indicators measuring Institutional Checks & Balances, Absence of Undue Influence on Government, Civic Checks & Balances, Disclosure of Public Records, Accessibility of Public Records, and Public Perception of Accountability.

The Anti-Corruption sub-category includes six indicators measuring Anti-Corruption Mechanisms, Absence of Corruption in State Institutions, Absence of Corruption in the Public Sector, Public Procurement Procedures, Absence of Corruption in the Private Sector and Public Perception of Anti-Corruption.

=== Participation, Rights and Inclusion ===
Scores on the participation and human rights category based on report from 2009: 100 / 75 / 50; 25 / 0 / no data

The 24 indicators in the Participation, Rights & Inclusion category are divided into four sub-categories: Participation, Rights, Inclusion & Equality and Women’s Equality.

The Participation sub-category includes six indicators measuring Freedom of Association & Assembly, Political Pluralism, Civil Society Space, Democratic Elections, Deliberative & Participatory, Governance, and Public Perception of Political Participation.

The Rights sub-category includes six indicators measuring Personal Liberties, Freedom of Expression & Belief, Media Freedom, Digital Rights, Protection against Discrimination, and Public Perception of Freedom of Speech.

The Inclusion & Equality sub-category includes six indicators measuring Equal Political Power, Equal Political Representation, Equal Civil Liberties, Equal Socioeconomic Opportunity, Equal Access to Public Services, and Public Perception of Inclusion & Equality.

The Women’s Equality sub-category includes six indicators measuring Political Power & Representation of Women, Equal Rights & Civil Liberties for Women, Socioeconomic Opportunity for Women, Equal Access to Public Services for Women, Laws on Violence against Women, and Public Perception of Female Leadership.

=== Foundations for Economic Opportunity ===
Scores on the sustainable economic opportunity category based on report from 2009: 100 / 75 / 50; 25 / 0 / no data

The 23 indicators in the Foundations for Economic Opportunity category are divided into four sub-categories: Public Administration, Business & Labour Environment, Infrastructure and Rural Economy.

The Public Administration sub-category includes six indicators measuring Civil registration, Capacity of the Statistical System, Tax & Revenue Mobilisation, Budgetary & Financial Management, Effective Administration, and Public Perception of Easiness to Obtain an Identity Document.

The Business & Labour Environment sub-category includes seven indicators measuring Regional Integration, Economic Diversification, Business & Competition Regulations, Access to Banking Services, Labour Relations, Secure Employment Opportunities, and Public Perception of Economic Opportunities.

The Infrastructure sub-category includes six indicators measuring Transport Network, Access to Energy, Mobile Communications, Internet & Computers, Shipping & Postal Network, and Public Perception of Infrastructure.

The Rural Economy sub-category includes four indicators measuring Rural Land & Water Access, Rural Market Access, Rural Economy Support and Rural Representation & Participation.

=== Human Development ===
Scores on the human development category based on report from 2009: 100 / 75 / 50; 25 / 0 / no data

The 24 indicators in the Human Development category are divided into four sub-categories: Health, Education, Social Protection & Welfare and Sustainable Environment.

The Health sub-category includes seven indicators measuring Access to Healthcare, Access to Water & Sanitation, Control of Communicable Diseases, Control of Non-Communicable Diseases, Child & Maternal Health, Health Quality, and Public Perception of Health Provision.

The Education sub-category includes six indicators measuring Equality in Education, Education Enrolment, Education Completion, Human Resources in Education, Education Quality, and Public Perception of Education Provision.

The Social Protection & Welfare sub-category includes six indicators measuring Social Safety Nets, Poverty Reduction Policies, Socioeconomic Inequality Mitigation, Decent Housing, Food Security, and Public Perception of Social Protection & Lived Property.

The Sustainable Environment sub-category includes five indicators measuring Promotion of Environmental Sustainability, Enforcement of Environmental Policies, Air Quality, Sustainable Use of Land & Forests and Land & Water Biodiversity Protection.

== Criticism ==
Some scholars have questioned the effectiveness of the Index and particularly the need for civil society to engage with its results, pointing out that there does not often exist in Africa a strong and effective civil society.

== 2022 Ibrahim Index of African Governance Overall Governance rankings ==
Rank/54	Country	Score/100	Change 2012-2021
1	Mauritius	74.9	▼ -2.2
2	Seychelles	73.4	▲ +9.3
3	Tunisia	70.9	▲ +3.1
4	Cape Verde	70.7	▼ -1.2
5	Botswana	68.1	▲ +0.8
6	South Africa	67.7	▲ +0.9
7	Ghana	64.8	▲ +1.1
8	Namibia	64.1	▲ +1.0
9	Senegal	62.4	▲ +1.5
10	Morocco	61.5	▲ +4.9
11	São Tomé and Príncipe	59.5	▲ +1.6
12	Rwanda	59.1	▲ +2.0
13	Kenya	58.7	▲ +3.1
14	Benin	56.1	▼ -0.3
15	Algeria	55.6	▲ +2.1
16	Gambia	55.3	▲ +9.5
17	Lesotho	54.9	▼ -0.5
18	Burkina Faso	54.6	▲ +0.2
19	Malawi	54.6	▲ +1.4
20	Côte d'Ivoire	54.3	▲ +5.4
21	Tanzania	53.4	▲ +0.6
22	Sierra Leone	52.2	▲ +4.3
23	Togo	50.5	▲ +3.8
24	Zambia	50.0	▼ -3.1
25	Liberia	48.8	▲ +1.7
26	Mozambique	48.6	▼ -0.8
27	Egypt	48.4	▼ -1.5
28	Gabon	48.4	▲ +2.1
29	Zimbabwe	48.1	▲ +3.1
30	Nigeria	47.7	▼ -0.5
31	Uganda	47.5	▼ -2.2
31	Ethiopia	46.0	▲ +5.1
33	Niger	46.0	▼ -2.6
34	Madagascar	44.2	▲ +3.0
35	Eswatini	43.9	▲ +0.9
36	Cameroon	43.2	▼ -0.7
37	Mali	43.1	▼ -3.3
38	Comoros	42.5	▼ -4.9
39	Djibouti	42.2	▲ +3.3
40	Angola	41.5	▲ +5.4
41	Mauritania	41.3	▲ +2.2
42	Guinea	41.2	▲ +0.1
43	Burundi	40.4	▼ -1.3
44	Guinea-Bissau	40.2	▲ +1.7
45	Libya	35.7	▼ -8.5
46	Republic of the Congo	35.1	▼ -1.8
47	Chad	34.5	▲ +2.8
48	Sudan	34.5	▲ +5.1
49	Democratic Republic of the Congo	32.7	▼ -0.7
50	Central African Republic	30.6	▼ -2.0
51	Equatorial Guinea	27.3	▲ +1.2
52	Eritrea	25.9	▲ +1.9
53	Somalia	23.2	▲ +5.3
54	South Sudan	18.5	▼ -5.7

== Previous IIAG Indexes ==
=== 2019 IIAG Index ===
Rank/54	Country	Score/100	Change 2010-2019
1	Mauritius	77.2	▼ -0.5
2	Cape Verde	73.1	▲ +0.2
3	Seychelles	72.3	▲ +7.8
4	Tunisia	70.4	▲ +8.2
5	Botswana	66.9	▲ +0.8
6	South Africa	65.8	▼ -0.9
7	Namibia	65.1	▲ +3.4
8	Ghana	64.3	▲ +0.1
9	Senegal	63.2	▲ +3.3
10	Morocco	61.0	▲ +5.3
11	Rwanda	60.5	▲ +3.7
12	São Tomé and Príncipe	60.4	▲ +2.8
13	Benin	58.6	▲ +1.1
14	Kenya	58.5	▲ +3.7
15	Algeria	56.2	▲ +3.3
16	Gambia	55.9	▲ +9.2
17	Burkina Faso	54.0	▲ +1.0
18	Côte d'Ivoire	53.9	▲ +9.0
19	Tanzania	53.0	▲ +0.2
20	Lesotho	52.3	▼ -0.5
21	Zambia	52.0	▼ -0.8
22	Uganda	51.8	▲ +0.7
23	Malawi	51.5	▼ -1.3
24	Sierra Leone	51.0	▲ +4.8
25	Togo	50.1	▲ +4.8
26	Mozambique	49.0	▼ -0.2
27	Liberia	47.9	▲ +1.2
28	Niger	47.8	▲ +0.4
29	Gabon	47.7	▲ +1.0
30	Egypt	47.4	▲ +0.5
31	Ethiopia	46.6	▲ +6.7
31	Mali	46.6	▼ -2.5
33	Zimbabwe	46.1	▲ +7.4
34	Nigeria	45.5	▼ -1.6
35	Madagascar	44.4	▲ +1.7
36	Eswatini	43.8	▲ +2.5
37	Cameroon	43.5	▼ -0.6
38	Comoros	43.2	▼ -2.6
39	Guinea	42.5	▲ +1.3
40	Mauritania	41.6	▲ +2.0
41	Guinea-Bissau	41.4	▲ +2.8
42	Djibouti	41.3	▲ +2.0
43	Angola	40.0	▲ +5.4
44	Burundi	36.9	▼ -3.6
45	Republic of the Congo	36.1	▼ -0.2
46	Libya	35.2	▼ -5.5
47	Chad	33.9	▲ +3.7
48	Sudan	32.5	▲ +2.5
49	Democratic Republic of the Congo	31.7	▼ -2.8
50	Central African Republic	30.7	▼ -0.9
51	Equatorial Guinea	28.7	▼ -0.3
52	Eritrea	25.8	▼ -0.8
53	South Sudan*	20.7	0.0
54	Somalia	19.2	▲ +5.7
x	Average	48.8	▲ +1.2

=== 2013 IIAG Index ===
Rank	Country	Overall	12 Year Change
1	Mauritius	82.9	▲7.3
2	Botswana	77.6	▲5.6
3	Cape Verde	76.7	▲6.0
4	Seychelles	75.0	▲5.5
5	South Africa	71.3	▲0.6
6	Namibia	69.5	▲2.3
7	Ghana	66.8	▲5.3
8	Tunisia	66.0	▲4.4
9	Lesotho	61.9	▲7.7
10	Senegal	61.0	▲4.3
11	São Tomé and Príncipe	59.9	▲3.2
12	Zambia	59.6	▲8.6
13	Benin	58.7	▲2.5
14	Morocco	58.0	▲5.1
15	Rwanda	57.8	▲10.9
16	Malawi	56.9	▲5.2
17	Tanzania	56.9	▲1.4
18	Uganda	56.0	▲5.5
19	Egypt	55.0	▲0.4
20	Mozambique	54.8	▲2.3
21	Kenya	53.6	▲1.5
22	The Gambia	53.6	▲4.0
23	Burkina Faso	53.0	▲1.2
24	Gabon	52.8	▲6.4
25	Algeria	52.5	▲1.3
26	Eswatini	50.8	▲4.3
27	Mali	50.7	0.0
28	Niger	50.4	▲7.6
29	Liberia	50.3	▲24.8
30	Djibouti	48.2	▲1.7
31	Sierra Leone	48.0	▲14.8
32	Comoros	47.8	▲6.9
33	Ethiopia	47.6	▲5.1
34	Mauritania	47.3	▲0.7
35	Cameroon	47.0	▲5.2
36	Togo	45.8	▲8.2
37	Madagascar	45.7	▼ -11.7
38	Libya	45.3	▼ -0.4
39	Angola	44.5	▲18.1
40	Burundi	43.8	▲8.8
41	Nigeria	43.4	▲0.8
42	Guinea	43.2	▲6.2
43	Republic of the Congo	43.0	▲8.0
44	Ivory Coast	40.9	▲1.8
45	Equatorial Guinea	40.9	▲8.8
46	Guinea-Bissau	37.1	▼ -1.8
47	Zimbabwe	35.4	▲1.5
48	Chad	33.0	▲1.2
49	Central African Republic	32.7	▲3.8
50	Eritrea	31.9	▼ -5.5
51	Democratic Republic of the Congo	31.3	▲7.3
52	Somalia	8.0	▼ -1.7

*Sudan and South Sudan are not included in the IIAG.

=== 2014 IIAG Index ===
Rank	Country	Overall	5 Year Change
1	Mauritius	81.7	▲1.3
2	Cape Verde	76.6	▲1.3
3	Botswana	76.2	▲1.3
4	South Africa	73.3	▲0.5
5	Seychelles	73.2	▲2.7
6	Namibia	70.3	▲1.1
7	Ghana	68.2	▲1.6
8	Tunisia	66.0	▲2.2
9	Senegal	64.3	▲4.6
10	Lesotho	62.3	▲3.8

=== 2015 IIAG Index ===
Rank	Country	Overall	Change since 2011
1	Mauritius	79.9	▼0.7
2	Cape Verde	74.5	▼1.9
3	Botswana	74.2	▼1.8
4	South Africa	73.0	▲0.9
5	Namibia	70.4	▲2.0
6	Seychelles	70.3	▼0.8
7	Ghana	67.3	▼1.6
8	Tunisia	66.9	▲2.6
9	Senegal	62.4	▲4.5
10	Lesotho	61.1	▲2.2
