= Aïcha Bah Diallo =

Guinean education minister and activist

Minister of Education
- In office 1989–1996

Personal details
- Born: 1942 (age 83–84) Kouroussa, Guinea
- Relations: Thierno Aliou Bhoubha Ndian (great-grandfather)
- Education: Pennsylvania State University (BS); Gamal Abdel Nasser University of Conakry

Aïcha Bah Diallo (born 1942 in Kouroussa) is a Guinean education minister and women's rights activist, who served as Minister of Education from 1989 to 1996, and was responsible for implementing major reforms improving education among young girls.

== Early life and education ==
A paternal great-granddaughter of Thierno Aliou Bhoubha Ndian, Diallo has said of her early life and development as a leader: "I was empowered as a leader from a very young age, and I kept on going. I was the first girl born after three boys, and my parents would say to me, 'You are a leader. You have to be good at school, not second, but always be first, because we know that you can do it'". Diallo graduated with a Bachelor of Science degree in chemistry from Pennsylvania State University and received a postgraduate diploma in biochemistry from Guinea's Gamal Abdel Nasser University of Conakry.

== Career ==
During her terms as Minister of Education from 1989 to 1996, the number of girls enrolled in schools in Guinea increased from 113,000 to 233,000. In 1992, she helped established the Forum for African Women Educationalists (FAWE), and from 1996 to 2005 she served as a senior education leader at UNESCO, where she was appointed to help improve enrollment in female education in some of the least developed countries. In 2005, she helped set up the Association for Strengthening Higher Education for Women in Africa (ASHEWA) and was appointed Special Advisor to the Director General of UNESCO for Africa, a position which she held until 2009. She sits on the Liaison Committee of NGOs, which is partnered with UNESCO, the Mo Ibrahim Foundation's Prize Committee for Good Governance and Leadership in Africa, and is a member of the Islamic Development Bank President Advisory Panel (PAP/IDB).

Diallo has been outspoken on violence facing women in Africa, and has been quoted as saying in 2008: "Among all the obstacles that impede the path of girls to learning is gender violence: explicit gender violence such as sexual harassment, intimidation, abuse, assault and rape, and implicit gender violence such as corporal punishment, bullying, verbal and psychological abuse. We must fight against all these forms of violence inside and outside the classroom".

== Acclaim ==
Diallo has received significant accolades for her work in African education, including the French Ordre des Palmes Académiques, the Ivorian Officier de I'Ordre national, and the Chevalier de l'Ordre du mérite and Médaille d'Honneur du Travail of Guinea. New African magazine named her one of the 100 Most Influential Africans in 2013 and 2014. In 2015 and 2017, she received the WISE Prize for Education. Several private and public schools are named after her in Guinea, and there is also a school in her name in Senegal.
