= Daedalus (journal) =

Dædalus
- Journal of the American Academy of Arts and Sciences
- Discipline: Humanities
- Language: English
- Edited by: Phyllis Bendell

Publication details
- Former names: Proceedings of the American Academy of Arts and Sciences
- History: 1846–present
- Publisher: MIT Press for the American Academy of Arts and Sciences (United States)
- Frequency: Quarterly
- Open access: Yes
- Impact factor: 1.7 (2022)

Standard abbreviations
- ISO 4: Dædalus

Indexing
- ISSN: 0011-5266 (print); 1548-6192 (web)
- LCCN: 12030299
- JSTOR: 00115266
- OCLC no.: 1565785

Links
- Journal homepage; Online access

Dædalus is a quarterly peer-reviewed academic journal that was established in 1846 as the Proceedings of the American Academy of Arts and Sciences, obtaining its current title in 1958. The journal is published by MIT Press on behalf of the American Academy of Arts and Sciences and only accepts submissions on invitation.

In January 2021, the journal moved to an open access model.
