= Mo Ibrahim Foundation =

Foundation focusing on leadership in Africa

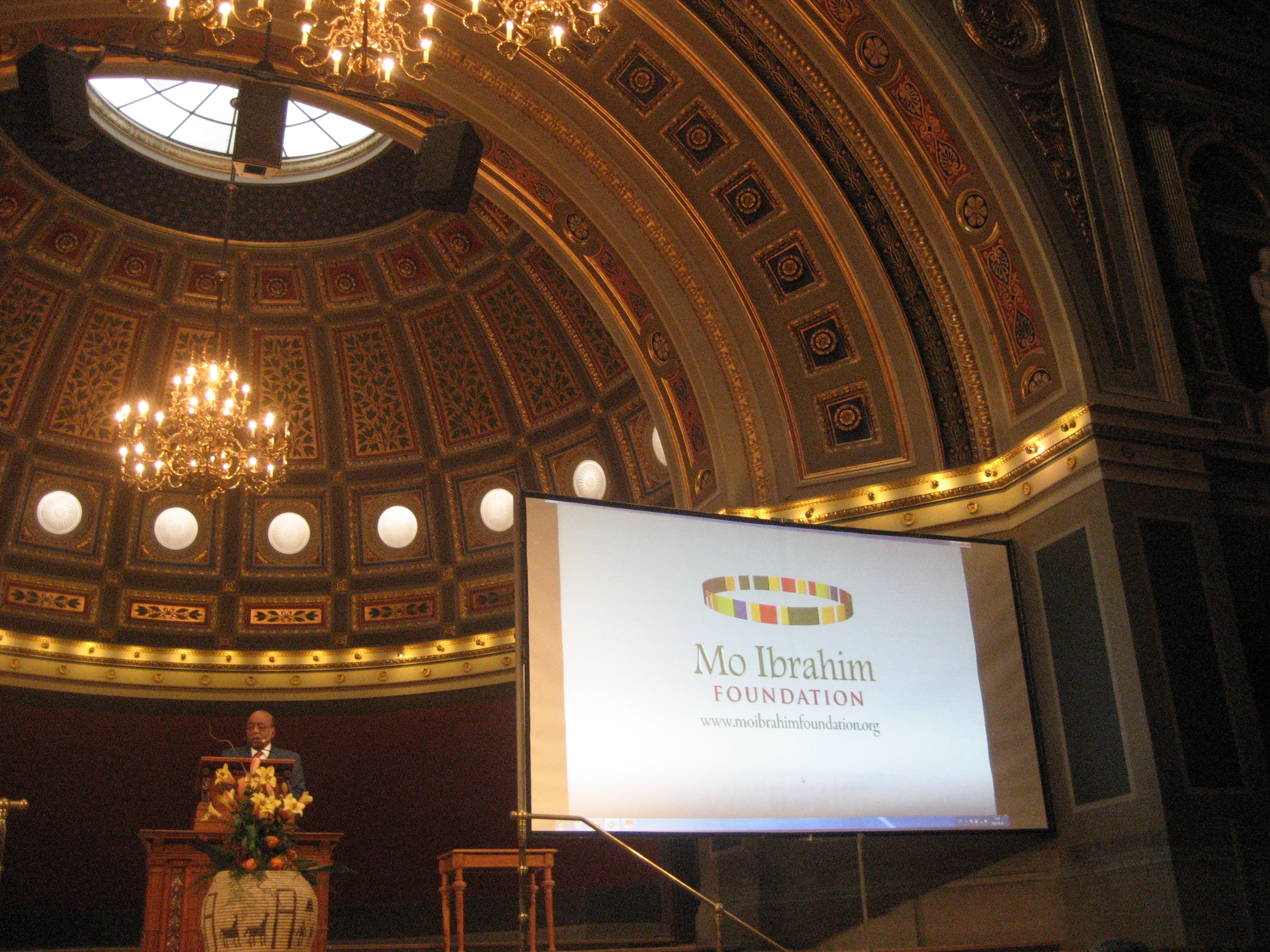
Mo Ibrahim (Uppsala, September 2014)

The Mo Ibrahim Foundation is an African non-grant foundation founded in 2006 by businessman Mo Ibrahim. Headquartered in London, United Kingdom, and Dakar, Senegal, it works to recognise achievement within leadership in Africa through initiatives including:

- Ibrahim Index of African Governance
- Ibrahim Prize for Achievement in African Leadership
- Ibrahim Governance Weekend
- Ibrahim Fellowships and Scholarships and the Now Generation Network

The Foundation is chaired by Mo Ibrahim. Other council members include Masood Ahmed, Valerie Amos, Josep Borrell, Jin-Yong Cai, Nathalie Delapalme, Moussa Faki Mahamat, Jendayi Frazer, Tsega Gebreyes, Arancha González, Dr Ali Hadi, Abdalla Hamdok, Hosh Ibrahim, Abdoulie Janneh, Donald Kaberuka, Pascal Lamy, Graça Machel, Mark Malloch-Brown, Ibrahim Mayaki, Yemi Osinbajo, Paul Polman, Mary Robinson, Nasi Rwigema, Macky Sall, Vera Songwe, Ngaire Woods, and Zeinab Badawi.

== The Ibrahim Prize for African Leadership ==
In 2007, the Foundation inaugurated the Ibrahim Prize for Achievement in African Leadership, to recognise outstanding political leadership on the continent and encourages good governance. The prize is awarded to a former African Executive Head of State or Government by an independent Prize Committee.

The Ibrahim Prize celebrates African leaders who, under challenging circumstances, have developed their countries and strengthened democracy and human rights, for sustainable and equitable prosperity. The prize is not necessarily awarded every year.

Prize criteria includes:

- Former African Executive Head of State or Government
- Left office in the last three years
- Democratically elected
- Served his/her constitutionally mandated term
- Demonstrated exceptional leadership

Award:

- US$5 million over ten years

Current members of the Committee include Mohamed ElBaradei, Mary Robinson, Aïcha Bah Diallo, Graça Machel, Josep Borrell, Moussa Faki Mahamat, and Ellen Johnson Sirleaf.

Previous Prize Committee Chairs:

- Kofi Annan, 2007–2011
- Salim Ahmed Salim, 2011–2020
- Festus Mogae, 2020 - 2026

Previous Prize Committee Members:

- Martti Ahtisaari, 2007–2019
- Ngozi Ikonjo-Iweala, 2007–2008
- Horst Köhler

The prize has previously been awarded:

- In 2007, the inaugural Prize was awarded to former president Joaquim Chissano of Mozambique, for "his role in leading Mozambique from conflict to peace and democracy." Nelson Mandela was also made an Honorary Laureate in recognition of his extraordinary leadership qualities and achievements.
- In 2008, Festus Mogae, former leader of Botswana, won the Ibrahim Prize. Kofi Annan stated: "President Mogae's outstanding leadership has ensured Botswana's continued stability and prosperity in the face of an HIV/AIDS pandemic, which threatened the future of his country and people." Both awards ceremonies were held in the Egyptian city of Alexandria.
- In 2009, the Prize Committee did not select a winner. The controversial decision came following the consideration of "credible candidates" and was interpreted by many as a laudable act in establishing a standard of credibility for the Prize.
- In 2010, the Prize Committee decided not to award the prize.
- In 2011, the Prize was awarded to Pedro Pires, former president of Cape Verde. Salim Ahmed Salim, Chair of the Prize Committee, presented President Pires with the award at a prize ceremony in Tunis, Tunisia.
- In 2014, to Hifikepunye Pohamba, former president of Namibia.
- In 2015 and 2016, the Prize Committee decided not to award the prize.
- In 2017, to Ellen Johnson Sirleaf, former president of Liberia.
- In 2018 and 2019, the Prize Committee decided not to award the prize.
- In 2020, to Mahamadou Issoufou, former president of Niger.

Nelson Mandela was also awarded an honorary Ibrahim Prize in 2007 and Desmond Tutu was awarded a Special Prize for speaking truth to power in 2012.

== The Ibrahim Index of African Governance ==
Launched in 2007, the Ibrahim Index of African Governance (IIAG) assesses governance performance in all 54 African countries over the latest available 10-year period. It provides a dashboard to assess the delivery of public goods and services and public policy outcomes in African countries.

The IIAG provides scores and trends at the continental, regional, and national levels, for different governance dimensions including security, justice, rights, economic opportunity and health. It aims to provide biennial data from multiple independent African and global institutions to assess the quality of governance in African countries.

== Ibrahim Governance Weekend ==
The Foundation hosts the Ibrahim Governance Weekend (IGW), a biennial three-day event that convenes African political and business leaders, representatives from civil society, multilateral and regional institutions, and some of Africa's international partners to debate challenges Africa face, such as climate change, migration, and urbanisation. Within this event, there is the Ibrahim Forum, a discussion forum that focuses on a specific issue of importance to Africa.

The event also includes the Now Generation Forum, where the Foundation convenes emerging African leaders and young professionals, to gather perspectives from the continent’s youth to be discussed across the weekend. The key ideas and takeaways from this event are shared at the Ibrahim Forum by representatives from the group, and some of these are included in an Ibrahim Forum Report published by the Foundation.

The event is held in a different African city each year, with previous IGW’s having taken place in Alexandria, Dar es Salaam, Port Louis, Tunis, Dakar, Addis Ababa, Accra, Marrakech, Kigali, Nairobi and Abidjan. In 2020 and 2021, due to COVID-19, the IGW was virtual.

== The Ibrahim Leadership Fellowships and Scholarships ==
The Ibrahim Leadership Fellowships were established in 2011 to identify and mentor the future generation of African leaders over a 12-month period. Each year three fellows have an opportunity to work in the executive offices of the African Development Bank (Abidjan), United Nations Economic Commission for Africa (Addis Ababa) or the International Trade Committee (Geneva), with a stipend of US$100,000. Over this period, Fellows contribute to research and policy and are mentored by heads of the Foundation.

The Ibrahim Scholarships were established in 2007, to support and develop the talent of young Africans in selected disciplines. The Ibrahim Scholarships support aspiring African leaders different academic institutions, including the London Business School, SOAS University of London, the University of Birmingham and Chatham House. All those who graduate from a Fellowship or Scholarship programme are automatically enrolled in the Foundation's Now Generation Network, a network of young and mid-career Africans, with members from all 54 African countries.

== The Now Generation Network ==
The Now Generation Network (NGN) currently consists of the Ibrahim alumni of Fellows and scholars and the participants of the annual Now Generation Forum (NGF). It is a pan-African network, comprising members from all African countries and from various sectors and disciplines.

The NGN includes different initiatives, including an In conversation with… series, which consists of an hour long ‘intergenerational dialogue’ between the Foundation’s leadership, partners of the Foundation, and a selection of NGN members.

In 2020, the Foundation also produced the first NGN survey, titled COVID-19 in Africa: what does it mean for young people? The report analyses youth perspectives on the challenges Africa faces as a direct result of COVID-19.
