= 2023 Charlotte mayoral election =

- November 7, 2023
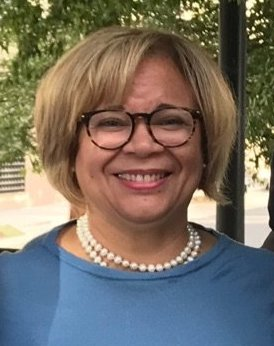

Nominee	Vi Lyles	Misun Kim
Party	Democratic	Republican
Popular vote	64,263	18,644
Percentage	73.3%	21.4%
- Lyles: 50–60% 60–70% 70–80% 80–90% ≥90% Kim: 40–50% 60–70% No data
Mayor before election
Vi Lyles
Democratic
Elected Mayor
Vi Lyles
Democratic

The 2023 mayoral election in Charlotte, North Carolina was held on November 7, 2023. The primary election for the Democratic Party was held on September 12, 2023, while only one candidate each filed for the Republican Party and Libertarian Party.

The incumbent Mayor, Democrat Vi Lyles, was first elected in 2017 and re-elected in 2019 and 2022. She was eligible to seek re-election for a fourth term and won.

== Democratic primary ==
=== Nominee ===
- Vi Lyles, incumbent Mayor

=== Eliminated in primary ===
- Lucille Puckett, nonprofit director and candidate for this office in 2013, 2017, 2019, and 2022

=== Primary results ===
Democratic primary results by precinct Lyles: 50–60%; 60–70%; 70–80%; 80–90%; ≥90%; Puckett: ≥90%; No data: No data

Democratic primary results
Party	Candidate	Votes	%
Democratic	Vi Lyles (incumbent)	20,109	85.36
Democratic	Lucille Puckett	3,449	14.64

== Republican primary ==
=== Nominee ===
- Misun Kim

== Libertarian primary ==
=== Nominee ===
- Rob Yates

== General election ==
=== Results ===
2023 Charlotte mayoral election
Party	Candidate	Votes	%
Democratic	Vi Lyles (incumbent)	64,623	73.62
Republican	Misun Kim	18,644	21.36
Libertarian	Rob Yates	4,062	4.65
Write-in		316	0.36
Total votes		87,285	100.00
