= 2015 Charlotte mayoral election =

- November 3, 2015
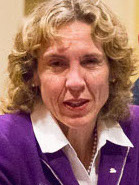

Nominee	Jennifer Roberts	Edwin Peacock III
Party	Democratic	Republican
Popular vote	41,498	37,905
Percentage	52.0%	48.0%
- Precinct results Roberts: 50–60% 60–70% 70–80% 80–90% >90% Peacock: 50–60% 60–70% 70–80% 80–90% >90% No data
Mayor before election
Dan Clodfelter
Democratic
Elected mayor
Jennifer Roberts
Democratic

The 2015 Charlotte mayoral election took place on November 3, 2015, to elect the Mayor of Charlotte, North Carolina. Mayoral elections in Charlotte are biennial, with the winner being sworn in in December.

Primary elections were held on September 15, 2015, with primary runoffs held on October 6 since no candidate took more than 40% of the vote.

Incumbent Democratic Party Mayor Dan Clodfelter has been in office since April 2014. He was appointed by the Charlotte City Council after Mayor Patrick Cannon, who was elected in 2013, resigned in March 2014 after being arrested for corruption. Cannon was later convicted and sentenced to 44 months in prison.

In December 2014, Clodfelter filed to run in the 2015 election. He lost the Democratic primary in a runoff to Jennifer Roberts, who went on to win the general election.

== Democratic primary ==
=== Candidates ===
==== Declared ====
- Michael Barnes, Charlotte City Councilmember, Mayor Pro Tem and former acting Mayor
- Dan Clodfelter, incumbent Mayor
- Roderick Davis
- David Howard, Charlotte City Councilmember
- DeJawon Joseph
- Jennifer Roberts, former Mecklenburg County Commissioner and nominee for North Carolina's 9th congressional district in 2012

=== Results ===
==== Round One ====
Candidates		Democratic Primary Election - Sept. 15	
Candidate	Party	Votes	Percent
Jennifer Roberts	Democratic	11,070	35.77%
Dan Clodfelter	Democratic	7,978	25.78%
David L. Howard	Democratic	7,335	23.70%
Michael D. Barnes	Democratic	4,326	13.98%
Roderick Davis	Democratic	150	0.48%
DeJawon W. Joseph	Democratic	86	0.28%

Roberts won the Sept. 15 primary but she did not receive 40 percent of the vote, and in such cases, North Carolina law allows for a "second primary," or runoff, between the top two vote-getters. The runner-up, Clodfelter, requested a runoff which will was held on October 6.

==== Round Two ====
Candidates		Democratic Primary Election Runoff - Oct. 6	
Candidate	Party	Votes	Percent
Jennifer Roberts	Democratic	12,811	54.3%
Dan Clodfelter	Democratic	10,784	45.7%

== Republican primary ==
=== Candidates ===
==== Declared ====
- Scott Stone, businessman and nominee for Mayor in 2011
- Edwin Peacock III, former Charlotte City Councilmember and nominee for Mayor in 2013 announced he would be running on May 19.

=== Results ===
Candidates		Republican Primary Election - Sept. 15	
Candidate	Party	Votes	Percent
Edwin Peacock III	Republican	8,357	66.15%
Scott Stone	Republican	4,277	33.85%

== General election ==
Candidates		General Election - Nov. 3	
Candidate	Party	Votes	Percent
Jennifer Roberts	Democratic	41,749	52.2%
Edwin Peacock III	Republican	38,019	47.6%

== See also ==
- United States elections, 2015
