= 2025 Charlotte mayoral election =

- November 4, 2025
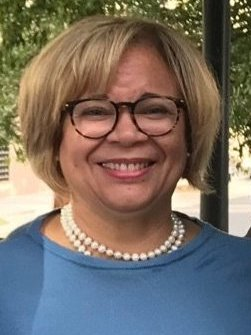

Candidate	Vi Lyles	Terrie Donovan
Party	Democratic	Republican
Popular vote	92,537	33,533
Percentage	70.45%	25.53%
- Precinct results Lyles: 40–50% 50–60% 60–70% 70–80% 80–90% ≥90% Donovan: 40–50% 50–60% No data
Mayor before election
Vi Lyles
Democratic
Elected mayor
Vi Lyles
Democratic

The 2025 Charlotte mayoral election was held on November 4, 2025, to elect the Mayor of Charlotte, North Carolina to a two-year term. The primary election was held on September 9, 2025. Incumbent Mayor Vi Lyles was re-elected to a fifth consecutive term.

== Democratic primary ==
=== Candidates ===
==== Nominee ====
- Vi Lyles, incumbent mayor

==== Eliminated in primary ====
- Jaraun "Gemini" Boyd, community activist
- Delter Guin III, banker
- Brendan Maginnis, candidate for U.S. representative in 2024
- Tigress McDaniel, perennial candidate

==== Declined ====
- Jennifer Roberts, former mayor (2015–2017)

=== Endorsements ===
Vi Lyles

Individuals

- Hugh McColl, former CEO of Bank of America

Organizations

- Black Political Caucus of Charlotte-Mecklenburg
- EMILYs List
- LGBTQ+ Democrats of Mecklenburg County

Newspapers

- The Charlotte Observer (Democratic primary only)
Brendan Maginnis

Trade unions

- Fraternal Order of Police Charlotte-Mecklenburg

=== Fundraising ===
Campaign finance reports as of August 26, 2025
Candidate	Raised	Spent	Cash on hand
Gemini Boyd (D)	$2,422	$1,952	$470
Vi Lyles (D)	$88,975	$52,745	$99,712
Source: Mecklenburg County Board of Elections

=== Results ===
Democratic primary results by precinct Lyles: 40–50%; 50–60%; 60–70%; 70–80%; 80–90%; No votes: No votes

Democratic primary
Party	Candidate	Votes	%
Democratic	Vi Lyles (incumbent)	27,592	70.74
Democratic	Brendan Maginnis	4,751	12.18
Democratic	Jaraun "Gemini" Boyd	3,922	10.05
Democratic	Tigress McDaniel	1,635	4.19
Democratic	Delter Guin III	1,107	2.84
Total votes		39,009	100.00

== Republican primary ==
=== Candidates ===
==== Nominee ====
- Terrie Donovan, real estate businesswoman

==== Withdrawn ====
- Matthew Grasela

=== Fundraising ===
Campaign finance reports as of August 26, 2025
Candidate	Raised	Spent	Cash on hand
Terrie Donovan (R)	$967 (Note: $100 of this total was self-funded by Donovan.)	$536	$431
Source: Mecklenburg County Board of Elections

== Third-party and independent candidates ==
=== Libertarian Party ===
- Rob Yates, nominee for mayor in 2023

== General election ==
=== Post-primary endorsements ===
Vi Lyles (D)

Newspapers

- The Charlotte Observer

=== Fundraising ===
Campaign finance reports as of October 20, 2025
Candidate	Raised	Spent	Cash on hand
Terrie Donovan (R)	$42,474	$23,889	$18,585
Vi Lyles (D)	$110,059	$65,127	$108,414
Source: Mecklenburg County Board of Elections

=== Results ===
2025 Charlotte mayoral election
Party	Candidate	Votes	%
Democratic	Vi Lyles (incumbent)	92,537	70.45
Republican	Terrie Donovan	33,533	25.53
Libertarian	Rob Yates	4,717	3.59
Write-in		555	0.42
Total votes		131,342	100.00
