= 2022 United States Senate election in North Carolina =

- November 8, 2022
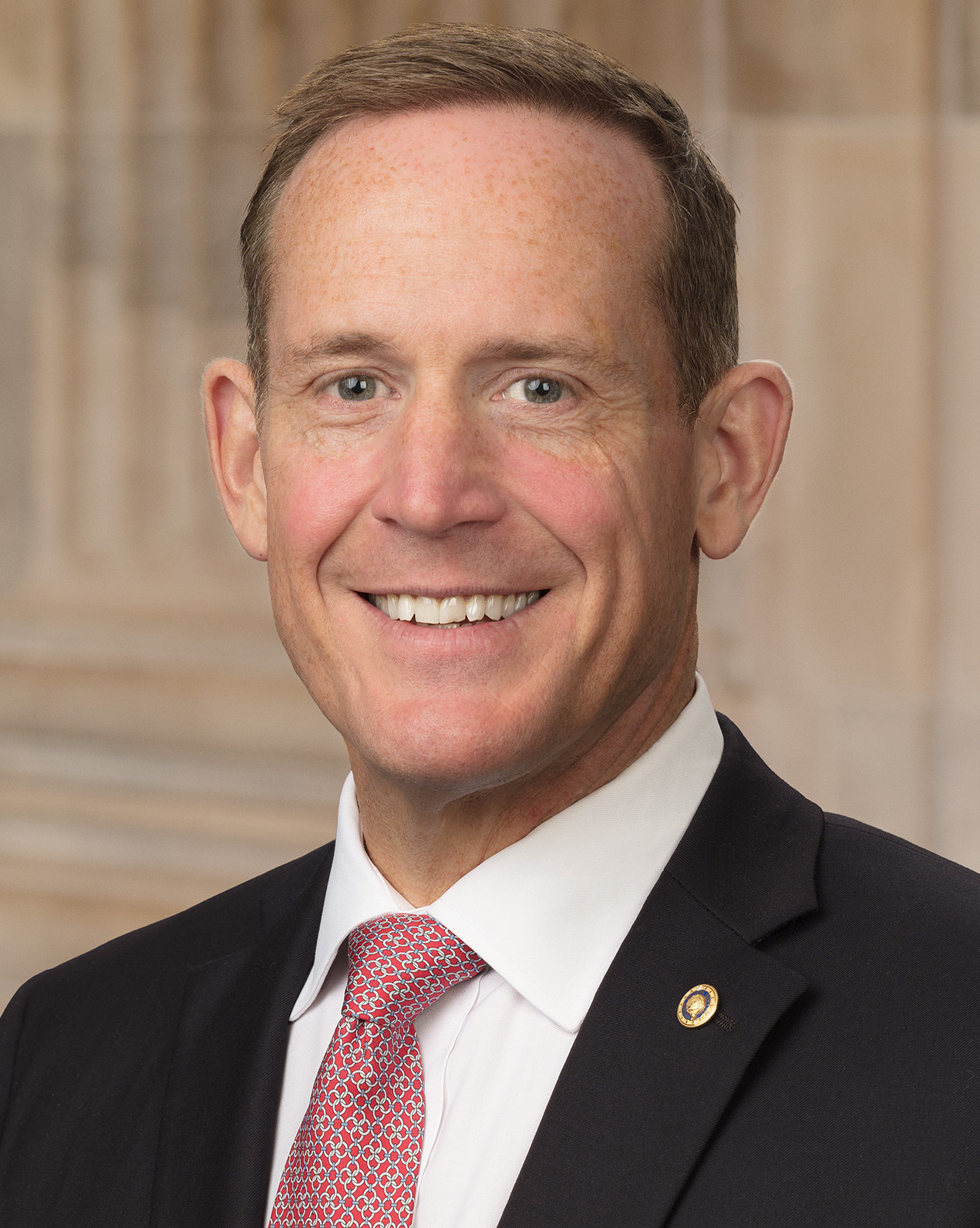

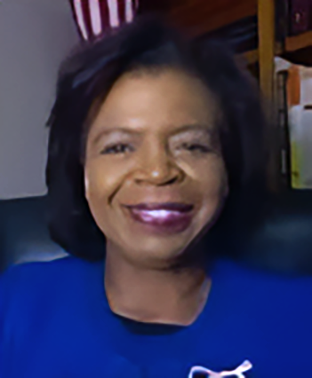
Nominee	Ted Budd	Cheri Beasley
Party	Republican	Democratic
Popular vote	1,905,786	1,784,049
Percentage	50.50%	47.27%
- Budd: 40–50% 50–60% 60–70% 70–80% 80–90% >90% Beasley: 40–50% 50–60% 60–70% 70–80% 80–90% >90% Tie: 40–50%
U.S. senator before election
Richard Burr
Republican
Elected U.S. senator
Ted Budd
Republican

The 2022 United States Senate election in North Carolina was held on November 8, 2022, to elect a member of the United States Senate to represent the State of North Carolina. Republican Congressman Ted Budd won his first term in office, defeating Democratic nominee Cheri Beasley. Primary elections were scheduled for March 8, 2022, but were delayed by the North Carolina Supreme Court and rescheduled for May 17.

Incumbent three-term Republican U.S. Senator Richard Burr announced in 2016 that he would not seek reelection in 2022. Former chief justice of the North Carolina Supreme Court Cheri Beasley and U.S. Representative Ted Budd won the Democratic and Republican primaries, respectively. The race was considered competitive, with Budd narrowly leading in polls. Budd ultimately won with 50.5% of the vote to Beasley's 47.3%—a margin of 3.2%.

Despite ultimately winning the election, Budd's performance marked the lowest share of the vote received by any Republican running for North Carolina's Class III Senate seat since 1998.

As of 2026, this is the last time Republicans won a U.S. Senate race in North Carolina.

== Republican primary ==
Former Governor Pat McCrory from Charlotte finished second in the primary.

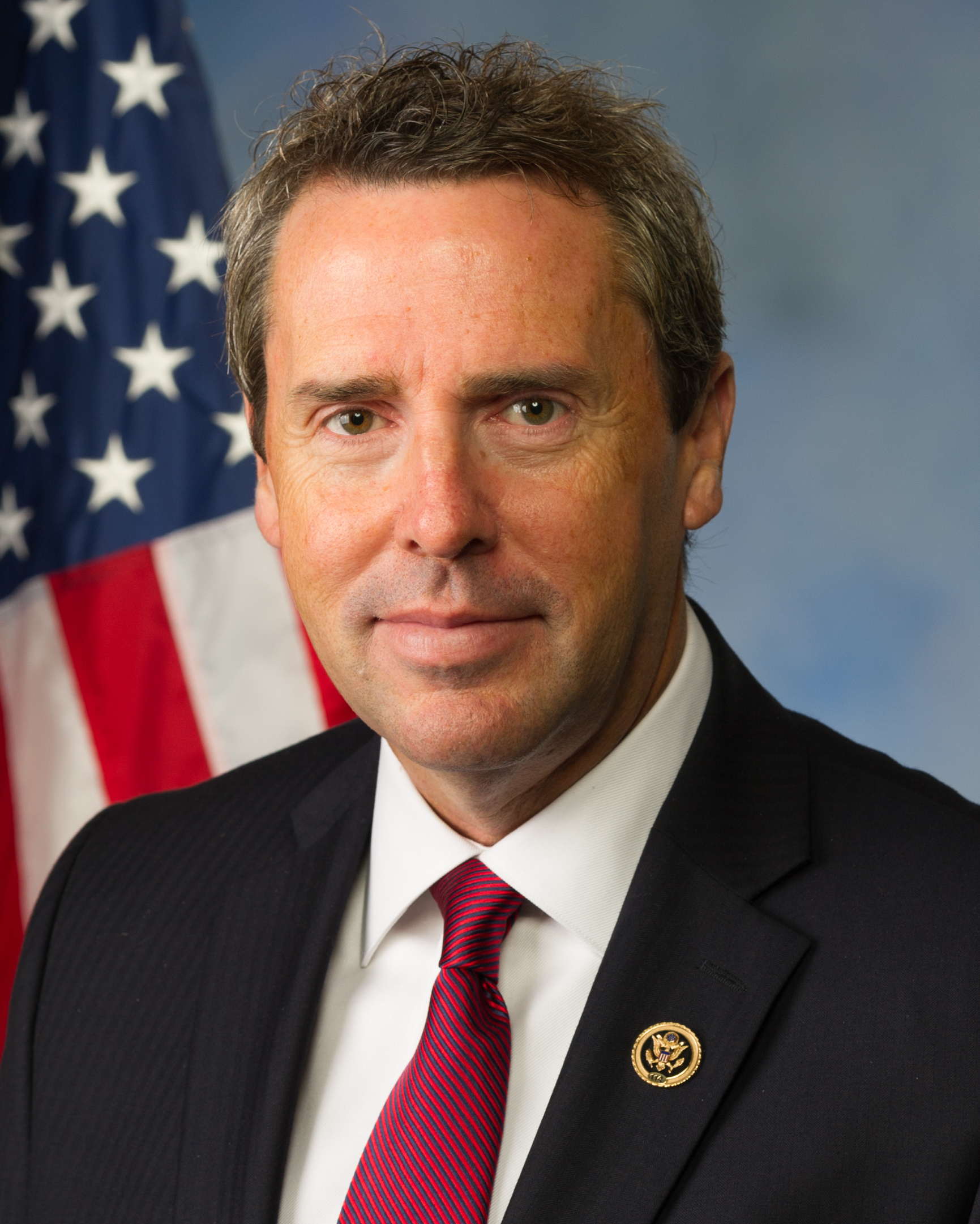
Former U.S. Representative Mark Walker from Summerfield finished third in the primary.

With Burr's retirement, this primary was expected to be very competitive. Former U.S. Representative Mark Walker was the first major candidate to announce his candidacy, on December 1, 2020. Walker opted to retire from the House and not run for reelection in 2020 because his district was made much more favorable to the Democratic Party after redistricting. Former president Donald Trump's daughter-in-law Lara Trump was widely speculated as a possible candidate for this seat. She received encouragement and support from U.S. Senator Lindsey Graham and Kellyanne Conway, a former Trump White House official. Early opinion polls suggested she would perform well against other prospective candidates in the primary. On April 14, 2021, former governor Pat McCrory announced his candidacy. U.S. Representative Ted Budd announced his candidacy on April 28, 2021.

Opinion polls taken during April 2021 showed McCrory with a wide lead over Walker and Budd. McCrory was aided by a high degree of name recognition because of his several statewide campaigns.

On June 5, 2021, the North Carolina Republican Party held a convention in Greenville. At the convention, former president Trump announced that he was endorsing Budd for the U.S. Senate seat. Lara Trump announced that she would not be running, and joined her father-in-law in endorsing Budd. The former president also took a shot at McCrory, saying, "You can't pick people that have already lost two races, that do not stand for our values." McCrory lost both the 2008 and 2016 gubernatorial elections. Budd was reportedly unaware of Trump's intentions until 15 minutes before he took the stage. Both Walker and McCrory stated their intentions to stay in the race.

Meanwhile, North Carolina redrew its congressional maps, making Walker's house seat more favorable to Republicans than it had been before 2020. After that, Trump met with Walker and promised to endorse him if he left the Senate race to instead run for his old House seat, newly numbered as the 7th district. Walker filed to switch races, but later decided against it in favor of staying in the Senate race.

The first primary debate was held on February 26 in Raleigh. It was sponsored by the John Locke Foundation, a conservative think tank based in North Carolina. McCrory, Walker and Eastman participated. Budd was invited, but did not attend, leaving an empty podium. The first televised debate was held by WRAL-TV on April 14 and featured McCrory and Walker, with Budd once again declining to attend. A third debate was held on April 20 on Spectrum News 1. McCrory, Walker, and Eastman participated. A fourth debate, sponsored by Nexstar Media Group, was held on April 26 and aired on television stations across North Carolina, including WJZY, WNCN, WGHP, and WNCT-TV. McCrory and Walker participated. Budd declined and Eastman was not invited.

Budd won the primary overwhelmingly with over 58% of the vote. McCrory finished second with almost 25%, and Walker third with 9%. Budd won a plurality in every county in the state except for Mecklenburg, which McCrory won by under 100 votes. After the results were released, McCrory declared his political career over. He did not endorse Budd for the general election.

=== Candidates ===
==== Nominee ====
- Ted Budd, U.S. representative for NC-13 (2017–2023)

==== Eliminated in primary ====
- Jen Banwart, Department of Defense employee (2001–2020), and legislative staffer on Capitol Hill (1994–1996)
- Lee Brian, videographer and withdrawn candidate for NC-04 in 2018
- Leonard Bryant, senior religious affairs advisor for the United States Army
- Drew Bulecza, businessman
- Marjorie Eastman, author and veteran
- David Flaherty, former state representative
- Benjamin Griffiths
- Kenneth Harper, business owner
- Pat McCrory, former governor of North Carolina (2013–2017), former mayor of Charlotte (1995–2009)
- Charles Kenneth Moss, radio evangelist and former member of the Randolph County Soil & Water Board
- Lichia Sibhatu, daycare owner
- Debora Tshiovo
- Mark Walker, former U.S. representative for NC-06 (2015–2021)

==== Withdrawn ====
- Marty Cooke, Brunswick County commissioner (since 2008)

==== Declined ====
- Richard Burr, incumbent U.S. senator (endorsed Pat McCrory)
- Dan Forest, former lieutenant governor of North Carolina (2013–2021) and nominee for governor in 2020
- Virginia Foxx, U.S. representative for NC-5 (2005–present)
- Mark Meadows, former White House chief of staff, former U.S. representative for NC-11 and former chairman of the Freedom Caucus (2013–2020) (endorsed Ted Budd)
- Tim Moore, speaker of the North Carolina House of Representatives (2015–2025) (running for reelection)
- Mark Robinson, lieutenant governor of North Carolina (2021–2025)
- Lara Trump, television producer, senior advisor to Donald Trump's 2020 presidential campaign, and daughter-in-law of former President Donald Trump (endorsed Ted Budd)
- Michael Whatley, chair of the North Carolina Republican Party

=== Endorsements ===
Ted Budd

Executive branch officials

- John Bolton, U.S. national security advisor (2018–2019), United States ambassador to the United Nations (2005–2006)
- Donald Trump, 45th president of the United States (2017–2021)

U.S. senators

- Marsha Blackburn, U.S. senator from Tennessee (2019–present)
- Ted Cruz, U.S. senator from Texas (2013–present)

U.S. representatives

- Dan Bishop, U.S. representative for NC-9 and Freedom Caucus member (2019–2025)
- Newt Gingrich, former speaker of the U.S. House of Representatives (1995–1999), former U.S. representative for Georgia's 6th congressional district (1979–1999)
- George Holding, former U.S. representative for NC-2 (2017–2021), NC-13 (2013–2017), and US attorney for the Eastern District of North Carolina (2006–2011)
- Jim Jordan, U.S. representative for OH-4 (2007–present)

State officials

- John M. Alexander Jr., state senator from District 18 (2019–2021) and District 15 (2015–2019)
- W. Ted Alexander, state senator from District 44 (2019–present)
- Tom Apodaca, state senator from District 48 (2003–2016)
- Kristin Baker, state representative from District 82 (2020–2025)
- Patrick J. Ballantine, state senator from District 18 (1995–2004)
- James L. Boles Jr., state representative from District 52 (2009–2023)
- Danny Britt, state senator from District 13 (2017–present)
- Jim Burgin, state senator from District 12 (2019–present)
- Warren Daniel, state senator from District 46 (2013–present) and District 44 (2011–2013)
- Carl Ford, state senator from District 33 (2019–present)
- Holly Grange, state representative from District 20 (2016–2021)
- Julia C. Howard, state representative from District 77 (2019–present), District 79 (2003–2019), District 74 (1999–2003) and District 37 (1989–1993)
- Frank Iler, state representative from District 17 (2009–present)
- Jake Johnson, state representative from District 113 (2019–present)
- Keith Kidwell, state representative from District 79 (2019–present)
- Joyce Krawiec, state senator from District 31 (2014–2024)
- Michael Lazzara, state senator from District 6 (2021–present)
- Tom McInnis, state senator from District 25 (2015–present)
- Jeffrey McNeely, state representative from District 84 (2019–present)
- Grey Mills, state representative from District 95 (2021–2025, 2009–2013)
- Paul Newton, state senator from District 36 (2017–2025)
- Ray Pickett, state representative from District 93 (2021–present)
- Larry Pittman, state representative from District 83 (2019–2023) and District 82 (2011–2019)
- Larry Potts, state representative from District 81 (2017–present)
- Mark Robinson, lieutenant governor (2021–2025)
- Bob Rucho, state senator from District 39 (2008–2017, 2003–2005) and District 35 (1997–2003)
- Jason Saine, state representative from District 97 (2011–2024)
- Mitchell S. Setzer, state representative from District 89 (2003–present) and District 43 (1999–2003)
- Fred Smith, state senator from District 12 (2003–2009)
- Jeff Tarte, state senator from District 41 (2013–2019)
- Harry J. Warren, state representative from District 76 (2019–present) and District 77 (2011–2019)
- Sam Watford, state representative from District 80 (2021–present, 2015–2019)
- Jeff Zenger, state representative from District 74 (2021–present)

Organizations

- Club for Growth
- Dairy Farmers of America
- FreedomWorks
- Gun Owners of America
- National Border Patrol Council
- North Carolina Troopers Association
- North Carolina Values Coalition
- Senate Conservatives Fund
Marjorie Eastman

U.S. senators

- Joni Ernst, U.S. senator from Iowa (2015–present)
Pat McCrory

U.S. senators

- Richard Burr, U.S. senator from North Carolina (2005–2023)

U.S. governors

- Jim Martin, 70th governor of North Carolina (1985–1993) and former U.S. representative for NC-09 (1973–1985)
Mark Walker

Executive branch officials

- Mick Mulvaney, former White House chief of staff (2019–2020), former director of the Office of Management and Budget (2017–2020), and former U.S. representative from SC-05

U.S. governors

- Mike Huckabee, 44th governor of Arkansas (1996–2007) and candidate for president of the United States in 2008 and 2016

U.S. senators

- James Lankford, U.S. senator from Oklahoma (2015–present)
- Tim Scott, U.S. senator from South Carolina (2013–present)

U.S. representatives

- Madison Cawthorn, U.S. representative for NC-11 (2021–2023)
- Paul Ryan, former speaker of the U.S. House of Representatives (2015–2019), former U.S. representative for WI-01 (1999–2019), and nominee for vice president of the United States in 2012

=== Polling ===
==== Graphical summary ====
Aggregate polls

Source of poll aggregation	Dates administered	Dates updated	Ted Budd	Marjorie Eastman	Pat McCrory	Mark Walker	Other (Note: Calculated by taking the difference of 100% and all other candidates combined.)	Margin
Real Clear Politics	April 1 – May 5, 2022	May 12, 2022	40.3%	2.8%	22.3%	8.5%	26.1%	Budd +18.0

Poll source	Date(s) administered	Sample size (Note: Key: A – all adults RV – registered voters LV – likely voters V – unclear)	Margin of error	Ted Budd	Marjorie Eastman	Pat McCrory	Mark Walker	Other	Undecided
Emerson College	May 7–9, 2022	467 (LV)	± 4.5%	43%	2%	16%	12%	12% (Note: Harper with 3%; Flaherty and Bulecza with 2%; Banwart, Bryant, Griffiths, Sibhatu, and Tshiovo with 1%; Brian and Moss with 0%)	16%
co/efficient (R)	May 4–5, 2022	1,089 (LV)	± 3.0%	48%	3%	20%	13%	5%	11%
Atlantic Polling Strategies (R)	April 25–28, 2022	534 (LV)	± 4.9%	45%	3%	21%	9%	2%	20%
Meredith College	April 25–27, 2022	588 (LV)	± 4.0%	33%	3%	26%	7%	6%	34%
WPA Intelligence (R) (Note: Poll conducted for Club for Growth Action, which has endorsed Budd's campaign.)	April 24–26, 2022	500 (LV)	± 4.4%	43%	4%	23%	9%	1%	20%
The Trafalgar Group (R)	April 23–25, 2022	1,049 (LV)	± 3.0%	53%	6%	29%	8%	–	4%
Spry Strategies (R)	April 6–10, 2022	600 (LV)	± 4.0%	40%	2%	27%	8%	3%	20%
SurveyUSA	April 6–10, 2022	593 (LV)	± 5.0%	33%	2%	23%	7%	2% (Note: Brian and Moss with 1%; Banwart, Bryant, Bulecza, Flaherty, Griffiths, Harper, Sibhatu, and Tshiovo with 0%)	33%
WPA Intelligence (R)	April 3–5, 2022	510 (LV)	± 4.4%	44%	3%	31%	11%	1%	11%
Emerson College	April 2–4, 2022	508 (LV)	± 4.3%	38%	1%	22%	9%	8% (Note: Griffiths with 2%; Brian, Bulecza, Flaherty, Harper, Moss, and Sibhatu with 1%; Banwart with 0%)	23%
Cygnal (R)	April 1–3, 2022	600 (LV)	± 4.0%	32%	1%	21%	7%	1% (Note: Banwart, Brian, Bryant, Bulecza, Flaherty, Griffiths, Harper, Moss, Sibhatu, and Tshiovo with 0%)	39%
Cygnal (R)	April 1–3, 2022	600 (LV)	± 4.0%	34%	3%	24%	10%	–	30%
Vitale & Associates (R) (Note: Poll conducted for the North Carolina Values Coalition)	March 22–23, 2022	504 (LV)	± 4.4%	32%	2%	29%	12%	–	25%
Meeting Street Insights (R) (Note: Poll conducted for Budd's campaign)	February 26 – March 1, 2022	500 (LV)	± 4.4%	25%	4%	31%	16%	–	23%
Ingress Research Group (R) (Note: Poll conducted for Awake Carolina, which supports Walker)	February 27, 2022	864 (LV)	± 3.3%	18%	4%	29%	11%	–	35%
Remington Research Group (R) (Note: Poll conducted for Walker's campaign)	February 2022	– (LV)	–	24%	3%	35%	17%	–	21%
Cygnal (R)	January 7–9, 2022	600 (LV)	± 4.0%	19%	1%	24%	7%	1% (Note: Bishop with 1%, Banwart with 0%)	49%
Strategic Partners Solutions (R) (Note: Poll conducted for McCrory's campaign committee)	January 5, 2022	800 (LV)	± 3.5%	21%	1%	30%	8%	<1% (Note: Cooke with <1%; Banwart and Harper with 0%)	41%
WPA Intelligence (R)	November 1–3, 2021	500 (LV)	± 4.4%	33%	–	36%	13%	–	18%
Public Opinion Strategies (R)	October 16–19, 2021	500 (LV)	± 4.4%	25%	–	40%	8%	–	–
WPA Intelligence (R)	June 22–24, 2021	509 (LV)	± 4.4%	21%	–	45%	13%	–	21%
Meeting Street Insights (R)	June 9–10, 2021	500 (LV)	± 4.4%	19%	–	45%	12%	–	23%
Spry Strategies (R)	April 21–24, 2021	700 (LV)	± 4.4%	5%	–	40%	11%	–	44%
Public Opinion Strategies (R)	April 6–8, 2021	500 (LV)	± 4.4%	9%	–	48%	13%	–	–

Hypothetical polling

Poll source	Date(s) administered	Sample size	Margin of error	Ted Budd	Dan Forest	George Holding	Pat McCrory	Tim Moore	Mark Robinson	Lara Trump	Mark Walker	Other	Undecided
Spry Strategies (R)	April 6–10, 2022	600 (LV)	± 4.0%	50%	–	–	30%	–	–	–	–	–	20%
Cygnal (R)	January 7–9, 2022	600 (LV)	± 4.0%	34%	–	–	33%	–	–	–	–	–	33%
WPA Intelligence (R)	December 19–21, 2021	504 (LV)	± 4.4%	47%	–	–	43%	–	–	–	–	–	10%
Cardinal Point Analytics (R)	April 20, 2021	500 (LV)	± 6.2%	2%	–	–	36%	–	–	36%	10%	–	15%
Cygnal (R)	April 2021	500 (LV)	± 4.4%	–	13%	–	14%	–	20%	32%	3%	–	–
Meredith College	March 12–15, 2021	217 (LV)	± 6.3%	6%	–	–	17%	–	–	27%	7%	4%	39%
UNLV Lee Business School	November 30 – December 2, 2020	221 (RV)	± 7.0%	–	–	3%	23%	2%	–	24%	7%	3%	39%

=== Debates ===
2022 North Carolina US Senate election Republican primary debates
No.	Date	Host	Moderator	Link	Participants			
Key: P Participant A Absent N Non-invitee I Invitee W Withdrawn								
Key: P Participant A Absent N Non-invitee I Invitee W Withdrawn					Ted Budd	Marjorie Eastman	Pat McCrory	Mark Walker
1	February 16, 2022	John Locke Foundation; Carolina Journal	Jonah Kaplan	Video	A	P	P	P
2	April 14, 2022	WRAL-TV	Lena Tillett	Video	A	N	P	P
3	April 20, 2022	Spectrum News 1	Tim Boyum	Video	A	P	P	P
4	April 26, 2022	Nexstar Media Group	Bob Buckley; Rod Carter	Video	A	N	P	P

=== Results ===
Results by county Budd: 40–50%; 50–60%; 60–70%; 70–80%; McCrory: 40–50%

Republican primary results
Party	Candidate	Votes	%
Republican	Ted Budd	448,128	58.61%
Republican	Pat McCrory	188,135	24.60%
Republican	Mark Walker	70,486	9.22%
Republican	Marjorie Eastman	22,535	2.95%
Republican	David Flaherty	7,265	0.95%
Republican	Kenneth Harper Jr.	7,129	0.93%
Republican	Jen Banwart	3,088	0.40%
Republican	Charles Kenneth Moss	2,920	0.38%
Republican	Leonard Bryant	2,906	0.38%
Republican	Benjamin E. Griffiths	2,870	0.38%
Republican	Debora Tshiovo	2,741	0.36%
Republican	Lee A. Brian	2,232	0.29%
Republican	Lichia Sibhatu	2,191	0.29%
Republican	Drew Bulecza	2,022	0.26%
Total votes		764,648	100.0%

== Democratic primary ==
After losing the 2020 Democratic primary for U.S. Senate, Erica Smith teased a campaign for the other Senate seat in 2022. She officially launched her campaign in March 2021. Jeff Jackson, who had represented the 37th district in the North Carolina Senate since 2014, was widely speculated as a potential candidate for Senate in 2020, but he decided to run for reelection to the State Senate instead. In fall 2020, Jackson said he would discuss a potential 2022 campaign with his family over the holiday season. In January 2021, Jackson officially launched his campaign, and began a tour of the state, holding town hall events in all 100 counties. Cheri Beasley narrowly lost her election to a full term as chief justice in 2020. In February 2021, it was reported that she had hired a campaign consultant and was preparing to enter the U.S. Senate race. Beasley officially launched her campaign on April 27.

In November 2021, Smith filed papers to run for North Carolina's 1st congressional district in 2022 after Representative G. K. Butterfield announced he would not seek reelection. On November 23, Smith officially launched her House campaign and ended her Senate campaign. She endorsed Beasley on November 30.

On December 16, 2021, Jackson withdrew from the race and endorsed Beasley, making Beasley the presumptive nominee.

Beasley easily won the nomination with over 81% of the vote.

=== Candidates ===
==== Nominee ====
- Cheri Beasley, former justice of the North Carolina Supreme Court (2012–2020); chief justice 2019–2020)

==== Eliminated in primary ====
- Greg Antoine, physician
- Chrelle Booker, Tryon city councillor (2019–present)
- James L. Carr Jr.
- Robert Colon
- Alyssia Rose-Katherine Hammond
- Constance Johnson, perennial candidate
- Tobias LaGrone, business owner, pastor, and counselor
- B. K. Maginnis
- Rett Newton, former mayor of Beaufort (2017–2021)
- Marcus Williams, attorney and perennial candidate

==== Withdrawn ====
- Jeff Jackson, state senator (2014–2023) and major in the North Carolina National Guard (running for NC-14) (endorsed Beasley)
- Erica D. Smith, former state senator (running for NC-01) (endorsed Beasley)
- Richard Watkins III, scientist and candidate for NC-04 in 2018 (running for NC-04)

==== Declined ====
- Sydney Batch, state senator (2021–present)
- Mandy Cohen, secretary of the North Carolina Department of Health and Human Services (2017–2021)
- Roy Cooper, governor of North Carolina (2017–2025)
- Anita Earls, associate justice of the North Carolina Supreme Court (2019–present)
- Terence Everitt, state representative
- Anthony Foxx, former United States secretary of transportation (2013–2017) and former mayor of Charlotte (2009–2013)
- Joan Higginbotham, electrical engineer and former NASA astronaut
- Vi Lyles, mayor of Charlotte (2017–present) (running for re-election)
- Grier Martin, state representative (2005–2022)
- Deborah K. Ross, U.S. representative from NC-2
- Heath Shuler, former U.S. representative for NC-11 (2007–2013)

=== Endorsements ===
Tobias LaGrone

Organizations

- Democrats for Life of America
Cheri Beasley

U.S. senators

- Cory Booker, U.S. senator from New Jersey
- Kirsten Gillibrand, U.S. senator from New York

U.S. representatives

- Alma Adams, U.S. representative from NC-12
- G. K. Butterfield, U.S. representative from NC-1
- David Price, U.S. representative from NC-4

State officials

- Roy Cooper, governor of North Carolina (2017–2025), 49th attorney general of North Carolina (2001–2017), majority leader of the North Carolina Senate (1997–2001)
- Jeff Jackson, North Carolina state senator
- Erica D. Smith, former North Carolina state senator and candidate for U.S. Senate in 2020 and 2022

Local officials

- Harvey Gantt, former mayor of Charlotte, North Carolina

Organizations

- Climate Hawks Vote
- Congressional Black Caucus PAC
- Council for a Livable World
- Democracy for America
- EMILY's List
- End Citizens United
- Feminist Majority PAC
- Giffords
- Human Rights Campaign
- Jewish Democratic Council of America
- League of Conservation Voters
- Let America Vote
- NARAL Pro-Choice America
- National Education Association
- Natural Resources Defense Council Action Fund
- Planned Parenthood Action Fund
- Population Connection Action Fund
- Sierra Club

Newspapers and publications

- Indy Week

=== Polling ===
==== Graphical summary ====
Poll source	Date(s) administered	Sample size	Margin of error	Cheri Beasley	Jeff Jackson	Rett Newton	Erica Smith	Richard Watkins	Other	Undecided
Meredith College	April 25–27, 2022	392 (LV)	± 4.9%	49%	–	–	–	–	16% (Note: Williams with 9%, "Someone else" with 6%)	35%
SurveyUSA	April 6–10, 2022	523 (LV)	± 5.3%	37%	–	2%	–	–	13% (Note: Williams with 4%; Booker, Carr, and Hammond with 2%; Antoine, Johnson, and LaGrone with 1%; Colon and Maginnis with 0%)	49%
	December 16, 2021	Jackson withdraws from the race.								
	November 23, 2021	Smith withdraws from the race.								
	November 17, 2021	Watkins withdraws from the race.								
Global Strategy Group (D) (Note: Poll conducted for Beasley's campaign)	November 1–7, 2021	800 (LV)	± 3.5%	39%	25%	–	–	–	–	36%
Public Policy Polling (D) (Note: Poll conducted for EMILY's List which endorsed Beasley prior to the poll's sampling period)	August 31 – September 1, 2021	700 (LV)	± 3.7%	33%	24%	–	–	–	–	43%
Cardinal Point Analytics (R)	April 20, 2021	500 (LV)	± 6.2%	32%	26%	8%	16%	3%	–	14%
Meredith College	March 12–15, 2021	312 (LV)	± 5.3%	13%	13%	–	11%	4%	3%	57%

=== Results ===
Results by county Beasley: 40–50%; 50–60%; 60–70%; 70–80%; 80–90%; 90–100%

Democratic primary results
Party	Candidate	Votes	%
Democratic	Cheri Beasley	501,766	81.09%
Democratic	James L. Carr Jr.	21,903	3.54%
Democratic	Alyssia Rose-Katherine Hammond	21,005	3.39%
Democratic	Marcus W. Williams	17,446	2.82%
Democratic	Constance Johnson	12,500	2.02%
Democratic	Rett Newton	10,043	1.62%
Democratic	Chrelle Booker	9,937	1.61%
Democratic	B. K. Maginnis	7,044	1.14%
Democratic	Robert Colon	6,904	1.12%
Democratic	Greg Antoine	5,179	0.84%
Democratic	Tobias LaGrone	5,048	0.82%
Total votes		618,775	100.0%

== Independents and third-party candidates ==
=== Libertarian Party ===
==== Declared ====
- Shannon W. Bray, author, U.S. Navy veteran, candidate for NC-03 in 2019 and nominee for U.S. Senate in 2020

=== Green Party ===
==== Declared ====
- Matthew Hoh, activist and veteran

=== Independents ===
==== Write-in candidates ====
- Michelle Lewis, activist

==== Failed to make general election ballot ====
- Kimrey Rhinehardt, University of North Carolina Wilmington faculty member, former lobbyist for the University of North Carolina system, and former staffer for incumbent U.S. Senator Richard Burr
- Brenda Rodriguez, veteran

== General election ==
=== Debates ===
2022 North Carolina Senate general election debates (Note: Minor candidates that aren't invited to any of the debates are omitted.)
No.	Date	Organizer	Location	Key: P Participant A Absent N Non-invitee I Invitee W Withdrawn		Source
No.	Date	Organizer	Location	Cheri Beasley	Ted Budd	Source
1	October 7, 2022	Spectrum News 1 North Carolina	Raleigh	P	P	

=== Predictions ===
Source	Ranking	As of
The Cook Political Report	Lean R	February 25, 2022
Inside Elections	Tilt R	October 7, 2022
Sabato's Crystal Ball	Lean R	August 2, 2022
Politico	Lean R	April 1, 2022
RCP	Lean R	October 26, 2022
Fox News	Lean R	May 12, 2022
DDHQ	Lean R	October 6, 2022
538	Likely R	August 3, 2022
The Economist	Lean R	September 7, 2022

=== Post-primary endorsements ===
Ted Budd (R)

Executive branch officials

- Nikki Haley, U.S. ambassador to the United Nations (2017–2018)
- Mike Pence, vice president of the United States (2017–2021)
- Mike Pompeo, United States secretary of state (2018–2021) and director of the Central Intelligence Agency (2017–2018)

U.S. senators

- John Kennedy, U.S. senator from Louisiana (2017–present)
- Tim Scott, U.S. senator from South Carolina (2013-present)

U.S. representatives

- Brian Mast, U.S. representative for FL-18 (2017–2023)

State officials

- Steve Troxler, agriculture commissioner of North Carolina (2005–present)

State legislators

- Jay Adams, state representative from District 96 (2015–present)
- Mike Clampitt, state representative from District 119 (2021–2026, 2017–2019)
- Jimmy Dixon, state representative from District 4 (2021–present, 2017–2019)
- Jeffrey Elmore, state representative from District 94 (2021–2024, 2017–2019)
- Karl Gillespie, state representative from District 120 (2021–present, 2017–2019)
- Bobby Hanig, state senator from District 6 (2022–present) and state representative from District 120 (2019–2022)
- Kathy Harrington, majority leader of the North Carolina Senate (2021–2023) and state senator from District 43 (2011–2023)
- Brenden Jones, state representative from District 46 (2017–present)
- Donny Lambeth, state representative from District 75 (2013–present)
- Charlie Miller, state representative from District 19 (2021–present)
- Cleta Mitchell, Oklahoma state representative from District 44 (1977–1985) and adviser to Donald Trump
- Ben Moss, state representative from District 66 (2021–present)
- Mark Pless, state representative from District 118 (2021–present)
- Bill Rabon, state senator from District 8 (2011–present)
- David Rogers, state representative from District 112 (2016–2023)
- Wayne Sasser, state representative from District 67 (2019–2025)
- John I. Sauls, state representative from District 51 (2017–present, 2003–2007)
- Sarah Stevens, speaker pro tempore of the North Carolina House of Representatives (2017–2025) and state representative from District 90 (2009–present)
- Matthew Winslow, state representative from District 7 (2021–present)

Local officials

- Donnie Harrison, former sheriff of Wake County (2002–2018)

Newspapers

- Rhino Times

Organizations

- American Principles Project
- Campaign for Working Families
- The Conservative Caucus
- Family Research Council Action PAC
- Home School Legal Defense Association
- Huck PAC
- National Federation of Independent Business
- National Republican Senatorial Committee
- National Right to Life Committee
- NRA Political Victory Fund
- Republican Jewish Coalition
- Tea Party Express
- United States Chamber of Commerce
Cheri Beasley (D)

U.S. presidents

- Barack Obama, 44th president of the United States (2009–2017)

U.S. senators

- Doug Jones, former U.S. senator from Alabama
- Jon Ossoff, U.S. senator from Georgia
- Debbie Stabenow, U.S. senator from Michigan

U.S. representatives

- Jim Clyburn, U.S. representative for SC-6
- Deborah K. Ross, U.S. representative for NC-2

State officials

- Don Davis, state senator from District 5

Local officials

- Harvey Gantt, former mayor of Charlotte, North Carolina

Individuals

- Oprah Winfrey, businesswoman and talk show host

Organizations

- Equality North Carolina
- National Wildlife Federation
- National Women's Political Caucus
- North Carolina AFL–CIO

Newspapers

- The Charlotte Observer
- The Daily Tar Heel
Michelle Lewis (write-in)

Political parties

- Reform Party of the United States of America
Declined to endorse

State officials

- Pat McCrory, former governor of North Carolina and runner-up in the Republican primary (Republican)

=== Fundraising ===
In the first quarter of 2022, Beasley raised $3.6 million. In the second quarter of 2022, Beasley reported raising $7.42 million, narrowly beating a second quarter record set by Cal Cunningham in 2020.

=== Polling ===
Aggregate polls

Source of poll aggregation	Dates administered	Dates updated	Ted Budd (R)	Cheri Beasley (D)	Undecided (Note: Calculated by taking the difference of 100% and all other candidates combined.)	Margin
Real Clear Politics	October 20 – November 6, 2022	November 7, 2022	51.0%	45.0%	4.0%	Budd +6.0
FiveThirtyEight	November 10, 2021 – November 6, 2022	November 7, 2022	49.5%	45.2%	5.3%	Budd +4.3
270toWin	November 2–7, 2022	November 7, 2022	50.5%	45.5%	4.0%	Budd +5.0
Average			50.3%	45.2%	4.4%	Budd +5.1

Graphical summary

Poll source	Date(s) administered	Sample size	Margin of error	Ted Budd (R)	Cheri Beasley (D)	Other	Undecided
The Trafalgar Group (R)	November 4–6, 2022	1,098 (LV)	± 2.9%	51%	45%	2%	1%
Data for Progress (D)	November 2–6, 2022	1,322 (LV)	± 2.0%	51%	45%	3% (Note: Bray (L) with 2%; Hoh (G) with 1%)	–
East Carolina University	November 1–3, 2022	1,183 (LV)	± 3.3%	52%	47%	1% (Note: Bray (L) with 1%; Hoh (G) with <1%; "Write-in candidate" with <1%)	–
ActiVote	August 5 – November 3, 2022	250 (LV)	± 6.0%	48%	47%	5% (Note: Hoh (G) with 4%; Bray (L) with 1%)	–
Remington Research Group (R)	November 1–2, 2022	1,140 (LV)	± 2.9%	50%	43%	2% (Note: Bray (L) with 1%; Hoh (G) with 1%)	5%
Civiqs	October 29 – November 2, 2022	674 (LV)	± 4.9%	49%	49%	2% (Note: "Someone else" with 2%)	1%
Meredith College	October 27–30, 2022	724 (RV)	± 3.4%	44%	43%	7% (Note: Bray (L) with 4%; Hoh (G) with 1%; "Someone else" with 2%)	7%
Emerson College	October 27–29, 2022	1,000 (LV)	± 3.0%	50%	45%	3% (Note: Bray (L) with 1%; Hoh (G) with 1%; "Someone else" with 1%)	2%
Emerson College	October 27–29, 2022	1,000 (LV)	± 3.0%	51%	46%	4% (Note: Bray (L) with 2%; Hoh (G) with 1%; "Someone else" with 1%)	–
Cygnal (R) (Note: Poll conducted for the John Locke Foundation, a conservative think tank.)	October 20–22, 2022	600 (LV)	± 4.0%	47%	43%	2% (Note: Bray (L) with 2%; Hoh (G) with <1%)	7%
Marist College	October 17–20, 2022	1,130 (RV)	± 3.8%	44%	44%	2% (Note: "Another party's candidate" with 2%)	10%
Marist College	October 17–20, 2022	899 (LV)	± 4.2%	49%	45%	1% (Note: "Another party's candidate" with 1%)	5%
The Trafalgar Group (R)	October 16–19, 2022	1,081 (LV)	± 2.9%	48%	44%	3% (Note: Bray (L) with 2%; Hoh (G) with 1%)	5%
East Carolina University	October 10–13, 2022	902 (LV)	± 3.8%	50%	44%	2% (Note: Bray (L) with 1%; Hoh (G) with 1%; "Write-in candidate" with <1%)	5%
Wick Insights	October 8–13, 2022	1,009 (LV)	± 3.1%	49%	44%	2% (Note: "Someone else" with 2%)	5%
Public Policy Polling (D) (Note: Poll sponsored by Carolina Forward, which supports Beasley)	October 7–8, 2022	606 (LV)	± 4.0%	46%	45%	–	9%
SurveyUSA	September 28 – October 2, 2022	677 (LV)	± 4.4%	43%	42%	2% (Note: Bray (L) with 2%; Hoh (G) with <1%)	13%
Cygnal (R)	September 24–26, 2022	650 (LV)	± 3.79%	44%	44%	2% (Note: Bray (L) with 1%; Hoh (G) with 1%)	10%
Meredith College	September 20–23, 2022	731 (LV)	± 3.3%	41%	41%	4% (Note: Bray (L) with 2%; Hoh (G) with 2%)	14%
Civiqs	September 17–20, 2022	586 (LV)	± 5.5%	48%	49%	1% (Note: "Someone else" with 1%)	2%
Global Strategy Group (D)	September 12–20, 2022	800 (LV)	± 3.5%	46%	46%	–	–
Emerson College	September 15–16, 2022	1,000 (LV)	± 3.0%	46%	43%	3% (Note: Bray (L) with 1%; Hoh (G) with 1%, "Someone else" with 1%)	9%
East Carolina University	September 7–10, 2022	1,020 (LV)	± 3.6%	49%	46%	1% (Note: Hoh (G) with 1%; Bray (L) with <1%)	4%
The Trafalgar Group (R)	September 1–4, 2022	1,079 (LV)	± 2.9%	47%	44%	4% (Note: Bray (L) with 2%; Hoh (G) with 1%; "Other" with 1%)	6%
Public Policy Polling (D)	August 29–30, 2022	601 (V)	± 4.0%	41%	42%	6% (Note: Bray (L) with 5%; Hoh (G) with 1%)	12%
Cygnal (R)	August 13–15, 2022	615 (LV)	± 3.9%	42%	42%	3% (Note: Bray (L) with 2%; Hoh (G) with 1%)	13%
Blueprint Polling (D)	August 4–6, 2022	656 (LV)	± 3.8%	42%	46%	–	12%
PEM Management Corporation (R) (Note: Poll conducted for John Bolton Super PAC)	July 22–24, 2022	300 (LV)	± 5.7%	40%	43%	2%	15%
The Trafalgar Group (R)	June 29 – July 1, 2022	1,068 (LV)	± 2.9%	48%	45%	4% (Note: Bray (L) with 2%; "Other" with 2%)	3%
Cygnal (R)	June 17–19, 2022	600 (LV)	± 4.0%	45%	40%	4% (Note: Bray (L) with 3%; Hoh (G) with 1%)	11%
SurveyUSA	June 8–12, 2022	650 (LV)	± 5.1%	40%	44%	2% (Note: Bray (L) with 2%)	14%
Cygnal (R)	May 21–22, 2022	600 (LV)	± 4.0%	44%	42%	3% (Note: Bray (L) with 2%; Hoh (G) with 1%)	12%
East Carolina University	May 19–20, 2022	635 (RV)	± 4.5%	49%	42%	2%	7%
Meeting Street Insights (R) (Note: Poll sponsored by the Carolina Partnership for Reform)	May 12–16, 2022	500 (RV)	± 4.4%	46%	45%	–	10%
Emerson College	May 7–9, 2022	1,000 (RV)	± 3.0%	48%	41%	–	10%
Global Strategy Group (D)	April 28 – May 4, 2022	800 (LV)	± 3.5%	45%	45%	–	10%
Emerson College	April 2–4, 2022	1,047 (RV)	± 3.0%	50%	43%	–	8%
Cygnal (R)	March 30–31, 2022	513 (LV)	± 4.3%	45%	43%	–	12%
Redfield & Wilton Strategies	November 10, 2021	777 (RV)	± 3.5%	37%	36%	3%	18%
Redfield & Wilton Strategies	November 10, 2021	757 (LV)	± 3.6%	40%	39%	3%	16%

Hypothetical polling

Marjorie Eastman vs. Cheri Beasley

Poll source	Date(s) administered	Sample size	Margin of error	Marjorie Eastman (R)	Cheri Beasley (D)	Undecided
Emerson College	April 2–4, 2022	1,047 (RV)	± 3.0%	44%	44%	12%

Pat McCrory vs. Cheri Beasley

Poll source	Date(s) administered	Sample size	Margin of error	Pat McCrory (R)	Cheri Beasley (D)	Other	Undecided
Emerson College	May 7–9, 2022	1,000 (RV)	± 3.0%	39%	44%	–	17%
Global Strategy Group (D)	April 28 – May 4, 2022	800 (LV)	± 3.5%	45%	44%	–	11%
Emerson College	April 2–4, 2022	1,047 (RV)	± 3.0%	41%	43%	–	17%
Cygnal (R)	March 30–31, 2022	513 (LV)	± 4.3%	41%	41%	–	18%
Redfield & Wilton Strategies	November 10, 2021	777 (RV)	± 3.5%	39%	37%	3%	15%
Redfield & Wilton Strategies	November 10, 2021	757 (LV)	± 3.6%	42%	40%	3%	13%

Mark Walker vs. Cheri Beasley

Poll source	Date(s) administered	Sample size	Margin of error	Mark Walker (R)	Cheri Beasley (D)	Undecided
Emerson College	April 2–4, 2022	1,047 (RV)	± 3.0%	47%	42%	11%

Generic Republican vs. generic Democrat

Poll source	Date(s) administered	Sample size	Margin of error	Generic Republican	Generic Democrat	Other	Undecided
Cygnal (R)	March 30–31, 2022	513 (LV)	± 4.3%	50%	44%	–	7%
Spry Strategies (R)	August 17, 2021	303 (LV)	± 5.6%	46%	34%	5%	15%
Cygnal (R)	May 6–8, 2021	600 (LV)	± 4.0%	47%	46%	–	6%
Cygnal (R)	March 2021	600 (LV)	± 4.0%	47%	46%	–	7%

=== Results ===
2022 United States Senate election in North Carolina
Party	Candidate	Votes	%	±%
Republican	Ted Budd	1,905,786	50.50%	−0.56%
Democratic	Cheri Beasley	1,784,049	47.27%	+1.90%
Libertarian	Shannon W. Bray	51,640	1.37%	−2.20%
Green	Matthew Hoh	29,934	0.79%	N/A
Write-in		2,515	0.07%	N/A
Total votes		3,773,924	100.0%	
Republican hold				

==== By county ====
County	Ted Budd Republican		Cheri Beasley Democratic		Various candidates Other parties		Margin		Total
County	#	%	#	%	#	%	#	%	Total
Alamance	32,866	54.8%	25,866	43.1%	1,281	2.2%	7,000	11.7%	50,013
Alexander	11,833	77.5%	3,031	19.9%	401	2.6%	8,802	57.6%	15,265
Alleghany	3,648	72.7%	1,249	24.9%	124	2.4%	2,399	47.8%	5,021
Anson	3,711	51.8%	3,324	46.4%	128	1.8%	387	5.4%	7,163
Ashe	8,371	70.8%	3,172	26.8%	274	2.4%	5,199	44.0%	11,817
Avery	5,089	74.5%	1,595	23.3%	150	2.2%	3,494	51.2%	6,834
Beaufort	12,338	65.0%	6,245	32.9%	393	2.0%	6,093	32.1%	18,976
Bertie	2,781	43.7%	3,492	54.9%	87	1.3%	-711	-11.2%	6,360
Bladen	6,745	57.2%	4,799	40.7%	239	2.1%	1,946	16.5%	11,783
Brunswick	44,911	61.4%	26,685	36.5%	1,497	2.1%	18,226	24.9%	73,093
Buncombe	43,222	36.0%	73,807	61.4%	3,097	2.6%	-30,585	-25.4%	120,126
Burke	20,456	68.2%	8,847	29.5%	675	2.2%	11,609	38.7%	29,978
Cabarrus	41,468	54.8%	32,372	42.8%	1,841	2.4%	9,096	12.0%	75,681
Caldwell	20,900	74.9%	6,404	22.9%	604	2.2%	14,496	52.0%	27,908
Camden	3,127	73.1%	1,006	23.5%	147	3.5%	2,121	49.6%	4,280
Carteret	22,709	70.4%	8,827	27.4%	704	2.2%	13,882	43.0%	32,240
Caswell	4,867	60.0%	3,121	38.4%	130	1.5%	1,746	21.6%	8,118
Catawba	38,252	68.8%	16,076	28.9%	1,238	2.3%	22,176	39.9%	55,566
Chatham	16,275	41.2%	22,493	57.0%	701	1.8%	-6,218	-15.8%	39,469
Cherokee	9,493	77.9%	2,448	20.1%	349	2.1%	7,045	57.8%	12,190
Chowan	3,360	60.9%	2,048	37.1%	112	2.1%	1,312	23.8%	5,520
Clay	4,073	73.8%	1,339	24.3%	106	1.9%	2,734	49.5%	5,518
Cleveland	21,654	65.9%	10,557	32.1%	635	2.0%	11,097	33.8%	32,846
Columbus	11,723	61.6%	6,888	36.2%	428	2.2%	4,835	25.4%	19,039
Craven	21,981	59.4%	14,101	38.1%	903	2.5%	7,880	21.3%	36,985
Cumberland	35,674	42.5%	46,449	55.3%	1,884	2.3%	-10,775	-12.8%	84,007
Currituck	8,593	73.8%	2,739	23.5%	306	2.6%	5,854	50.3%	11,638
Dare	10,236	57.4%	7,097	39.8%	511	2.8%	3,139	16.6%	17,844
Davidson	43,393	73.2%	14,643	24.7%	1,224	2.1%	28,750	48.5%	59,260
Davie	13,191	73.0%	4,501	24.9%	367	2.1%	8,690	48.1%	18,059
Duplin	9,852	64.8%	5,071	33.3%	287	1.9%	4,781	31.5%	15,210
Durham	22,107	17.3%	103,630	80.9%	2,360	1.9%	-81,523	-63.6%	128,097
Edgecombe	6,046	39.0%	9,213	59.5%	236	1.6%	-3,167	-20.5%	15,495
Forsyth	58,350	43.3%	73,524	54.5%	2,944	2.2%	-15,174	-11.2%	134,818
Franklin	15,292	55.3%	11,701	42.3%	637	2.3%	3,591	13.0%	27,630
Gaston	46,256	63.0%	25,676	35.0%	1,510	2.0%	25,580	28.0%	73,442
Gates	2,431	56.4%	1,758	40.8%	119	2.8%	673	15.6%	4,308
Graham	2,791	78.8%	639	18.0%	113	3.2%	2,152	60.8%	3,543
Granville	11,770	52.9%	9,950	44.7%	521	2.3%	1,820	8.2%	22,241
Greene	3,518	58.2%	2,410	39.9%	117	1.9%	1,108	18.3%	6,045
Guilford	74,544	39.8%	108,688	58.0%	4,004	2.2%	-34,144	-18.2%	187,236
Halifax	6,631	42.2%	8,889	56.5%	200	1.3%	-2,258	-14.3%	15,720
Harnett	22,860	61.9%	13,133	35.6%	930	2.6%	9,727	26.3%	36,923
Haywood	16,078	60.1%	9,972	37.3%	718	2.7%	6,106	22.8%	26,768
Henderson	29,798	58.2%	20,167	39.4%	1,200	2.3%	9,631	18.8%	51,165
Hertford	2,400	36.4%	4,096	62.1%	105	1.7%	-1,696	-25.7%	6,601
Hoke	5,594	42.7%	7,118	54.3%	388	3.0%	-1,524	-11.6%	13,100
Hyde	1,083	58.1%	731	39.2%	49	2.6%	352	18.9%	1,863
Iredell	46,598	66.9%	21,442	30.8%	1,585	2.3%	25,156	36.1%	69,625
Jackson	7,920	53.0%	6,557	43.9%	455	3.0%	1,363	9.1%	14,932
Johnston	46,239	60.8%	28,121	37.0%	1,694	2.3%	18,118	23.8%	76,054
Jones	2,382	61.5%	1,397	36.1%	94	2.4%	985	25.4%	3,873
Lee	11,042	57.4%	7,767	40.4%	424	2.2%	3,275	17.0%	19,233
Lenoir	10,452	55.9%	7,872	42.1%	362	2.0%	2,580	13.8%	18,686
Lincoln	26,130	72.0%	9,418	26.0%	737	2.0%	16,712	46.0%	36,285
Macon	10,698	67.9%	4,617	29.3%	429	2.8%	6,081	48.6%	15,744
Madison	5,797	57.4%	3,959	39.2%	345	3.4%	1,838	18.2%	10,101
Martin	4,717	53.9%	3,841	43.9%	188	2.2%	876	10.0%	8,746
McDowell	11,776	73.2%	3,895	24.2%	415	2.6%	7,881	49.0%	16,086
Mecklenburg	117,742	32.7%	234,787	65.2%	7,765	2.2%	-117,045	-32.5%	360,294
Mitchell	5,024	76.9%	1,354	20.7%	155	2.3%	3,670	56.2%	6,533
Montgomery	5,834	67.2%	2,667	30.7%	183	2.1%	3,167	36.5%	8,684
Moore	26,874	63.5%	14,586	34.5%	856	2.0%	12,288	29.0%	42,316
Nash	18,796	52.6%	16,401	45.9%	542	1.5%	2,395	6.7%	35,739
New Hanover	45,012	47.9%	46,785	49.8%	2,220	2.4%	-1,773	-1.9%	94,017
Northampton	2,962	43.7%	3,718	54.9%	97	1.4%	-756	-11.2%	6,777
Onslow	29,106	66.1%	13,544	30.8%	1,363	3.1%	15,562	35.3%	44,013
Orange	14,213	21.4%	51,125	76.8%	1,215	1.8%	-36,912	-55.4%	66,553
Pamlico	3,908	63.6%	2,091	34.0%	142	2.3%	1,817	29.6%	6,141
Pasquotank	7,304	51.6%	6,468	45.7%	389	2.7%	836	5.9%	14,161
Pender	15,466	65.7%	7,548	32.1%	511	2.2%	7,918	33.6%	23,525
Perquimans	3,813	69.7%	1,557	28.5%	98	1.7%	2,256	41.2%	5,468
Person	9,201	59.6%	5,905	38.2%	332	2.1%	3,296	21.4%	15,438
Pitt	26,160	47.5%	27,705	50.3%	1,161	2.1%	-1,545	-2.8%	55,026
Polk	5,686	59.5%	3,635	38.1%	231	2.4%	2,051	21.4%	9,552
Randolph	38,030	78.7%	9,313	19.3%	1,003	2.1%	28,717	59.4%	48,346
Richmond	7,317	58.1%	5,016	39.8%	263	2.1%	2,301	18.3%	12,596
Robeson	15,732	58.2%	10,736	39.7%	582	2.1%	4,996	18.5%	27,050
Rockingham	21,617	66.4%	10,110	31.0%	839	2.6%	11,507	35.4%	32,566
Rowan	32,766	68.0%	14,282	29.6%	1,149	2.4%	18,484	38.4%	48,197
Rutherford	17,330	73.9%	5,538	23.6%	573	2.4%	11,792	50.3%	23,441
Sampson	11,574	64.7%	6,045	33.8%	260	1.5%	5,529	30.9%	17,879
Scotland	4,922	51.7%	4,359	45.8%	238	2.5%	563	5.9%	9,519
Stanly	17,927	75.9%	5,163	21.9%	536	2.2%	12,764	54.0%	23,626
Stokes	13,915	76.4%	3,803	20.9%	487	2.7%	10,112	55.5%	18,205
Surry	18,303	74.1%	5,828	23.6%	573	2.3%	12,475	50.5%	24,704
Swain	2,884	60.4%	1,708	35.8%	184	3.9%	1,176	24.6%	4,776
Transylvania	8,832	54.6%	6,867	42.5%	471	2.9%	1,965	12.1%	16,170
Tyrrell	770	60.1%	482	37.6%	29	2.3%	288	22.5%	1,281
Union	56,882	63.1%	31,354	34.8%	1,867	2.1%	25,528	28.3%	90,103
Vance	5,620	43.3%	7,097	54.7%	253	1.9%	-1,477	-11.4%	12,967
Wake	160,818	35.5%	281,367	62.1%	10,985	2.5%	-120,549	-26.6%	453,170
Warren	2,753	38.3%	4,344	60.5%	86	1.2%	-1,591	-22.2%	7,183
Washington	1,996	49.0%	2,002	49.1%	77	1.9%	-6	-0.1%	4,075
Watauga	10,455	45.9%	11,677	51.2%	654	2.8%	-1,222	-5.3%	22,786
Wayne	20,723	58.7%	13,990	39.6%	615	1.7%	6,733	19.1%	35,328
Wilkes	19,294	78.6%	4,770	19.4%	482	2.0%	14,524	59.2%	24,546
Wilson	13,310	50.7%	12,503	47.6%	436	1.6%	807	3.1%	26,249
Yadkin	11,117	80.2%	2,400	17.3%	353	2.6%	8,717	62.9%	13,870
Yancey	5,706	64.2%	2,946	33.1%	235	2.7%	2,760	31.1%	8,887
Totals	1,905,786	50.5%	1,784,049	47.3%	84,089	2.2%	121,737	3.2%	3,773,924

Counties that flipped from Democratic to Republican

- Anson (largest city: Wadesboro)
- Pasquotank (largest city: Elizabeth City)
- Scotland (largest city: Laurinburg)
- Wilson (largest city: Wilson)

Counties that flipped from Republican to Democratic

- New Hanover (largest city: Wilmington)
- Watauga (largest city: Boone)

==== By congressional district ====
Budd and Beasley each won seven of 14 congressional districts.

District	Budd	Beasley	Representative
1st	48.8%	49.3%	G. K. Butterfield (117th Congress)
1st	48.8%	49.3%	Don Davis (118th Congress)
2nd	34%	63%	Deborah Ross
3rd	64%	34%	Greg Murphy
4th	31%	67%	David Price (117th Congress)
4th	31%	67%	Valerie Foushee (118th Congress)
5th	60%	37%	Virginia Foxx
6th	45%	53%	Kathy Manning
7th	56%	42%	David Rouzer
8th	68%	30%	Dan Bishop
9th	54%	44%	Richard Hudson
10th	70%	28%	Patrick McHenry
11th	53%	45%	Madison Cawthorn (117th Congress)
11th	53%	45%	Chuck Edwards (118th Congress)
12th	36%	62%	Alma Adams
13th	48%	50%	Wiley Nickel
14th	41%	57%	Jeff Jackson

== See also ==
- 2022 United States Senate elections
- 2022 North Carolina judicial elections

== Notes ==
Partisan clients
