= Patrick Cannon =

American politician

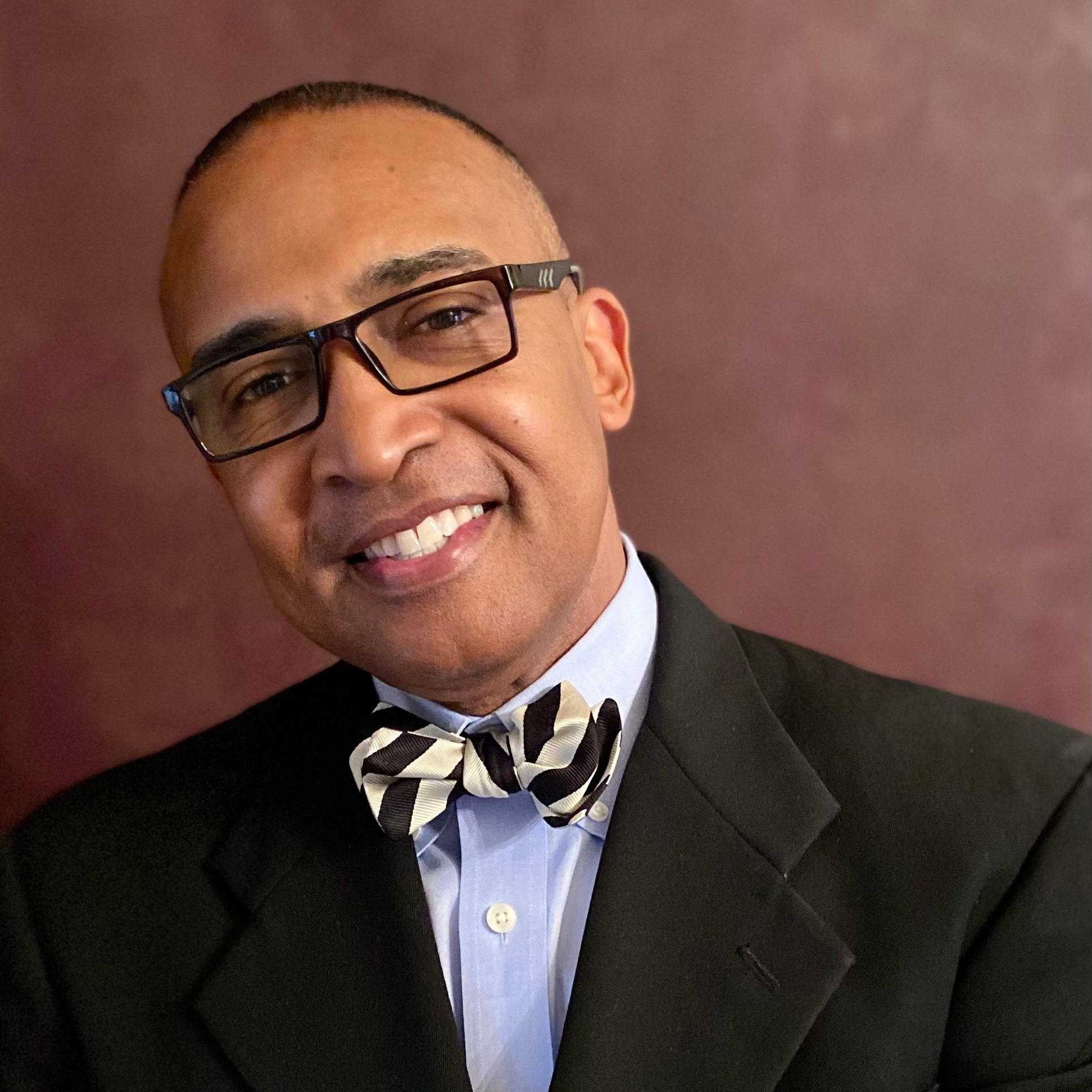
- Cannon, in 2025

56th Mayor of Charlotte
- In office December 2, 2013 – March 26, 2014
- Preceded by: Patsy Kinsey
- Succeeded by: Dan Clodfelter; Michael Barnes (acting)

Mayor Pro Tempore of the Charlotte City Council
- In office June 14, 2010 – December 2, 2013
- Preceded by: Susan Burgess
- Succeeded by: Michael Barnes
- In office December 3, 2001 – December 5, 2005
- Preceded by: Susan Burgess
- Succeeded by: Susan Burgess

Member of the Charlotte City Council
- In office December 3, 2001 – December 2, 2013
- Preceded by: Susan Burgess/Rod Autrey
- Succeeded by: Michael Barnes/Vi Lyles
- Constituency: at-large
- In office November 29, 1993 – December 3, 2001
- Preceded by: Ella B. Scarborough
- Succeeded by: Harold Cogdell
- Constituency: 3rd district

Personal details
- Born: November 27, 1966 (age 59)
- Party: Democratic
- Spouse: Trenna Cannon
- Children: 2
- Education: North Carolina Agricultural and Technical State University
- High School: South Mecklenburg High School

Patrick DeAngelo Cannon (born November 27, 1966) is an American politician and member of the Democratic Party who served on the City Council of Charlotte, North Carolina from 1994 through 2013 and was subsequently elected the city's 56th Mayor in November 2013. On March 26, 2014, Cannon was arrested on charges of accepting over $48,000 in bribes from undercover FBI agents posing as businessmen wanting to work with the city. Cannon resigned as mayor later that evening, and was later sentenced to 44 months in prison.

== Education ==
Cannon received a bachelor's degree in communications with a concentration in business marketing from North Carolina A&T State University in Greensboro, North Carolina. He also holds a certification from the University of North Carolina at Chapel Hill School of Government.

== City council ==
On November 2, 1993, Cannon was elected to the Charlotte City Council in 1993 as the district councilor representing the third district (a constituency located on the west side of the city). He won election as the Democratic Party nominee for his seat, having won a party primary ahead of the general election. When he was sworn-in on November 29, he was the youngest council member in the city's history, being 26 years old. Cannon was re-elected to his district seat in 1995, 1997, and 1999.

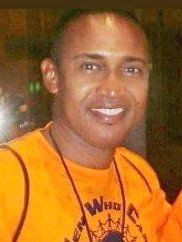
Cannon in 2011, at "Men Who Care Global."

In 2001, Cannon ran to be an at-large councilor instead of seeking re-election to his district seat. He won election, and was selected by councilors at the start of the new council term to serve as the council's mayor pro tempore. Cannon declared his candidacy for the 2005 Charlotte mayoral election. However, merely three months after his campaign launch, he withdrew his candidacy. Instead, that year he successfully ran for re-election as an at-large councilor. However, in the new council term that followed, the pro tempore position went to Susan Burgess. Cannon was re-elected in 2007 and 2009 as an at-large member of the council. On June 14, 2010, the council unanimously appointed Cannon as mayor tempore, after the position had been vacated by Burgess due to her ailing health. In late 2011, he was both re-elected to the council and re-appointed pro-tempore by the new council.

== Mayoralty ==
Cannon declared his candidacy in the 2013 mayoral election after Mayor Anthony Foxx declined to run again in order to become U.S. Secretary of Transportation. On November 5, 2013, he was elected as the mayor of Charlotte with approximately 53 percent of the vote. He was sworn in as mayor on December 2, 2013, at the Charlotte-Mecklenburg Government Center. At the time of his election as mayor, Cannon was a member of the Charlotte City Council and Mayor Pro Tempore.

=== Arrest on corruption charges and guilty plea ===
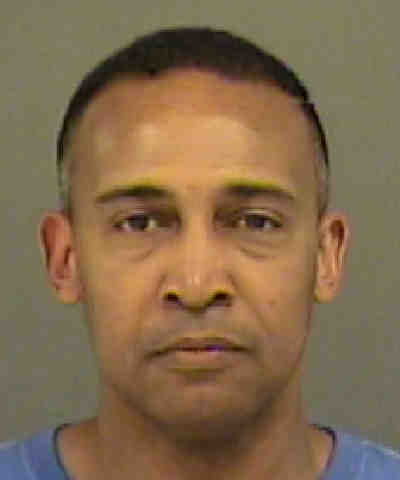
Cannon's mugshot, taken in March 2016

Cannon was arrested by the Federal Bureau of Investigation on public corruption charges of theft and bribery on March 26, 2014, following an FBI sting investigation that dated back to 2010, when Cannon was a member of the Charlotte City Council. He was released on bond at his initial court appearance later that day. He resigned as mayor of Charlotte shortly after his initial appearance.

On June 3, 2014, Cannon pleaded guilty to one count of honest services wire fraud, which carried a sentence of up to 20 years in prison and a $250,000 fine. He made the following public statement after pleading guilty:

It has been said that to whom much has been given much is required. For nearly half of my life, I have had the honor of serving the people of Charlotte. Much has been given to me in the way of the public's trust. I regret having acted in ways that broke that trust. For that, I am deeply sorry. I love Charlotte. It is the city of my birth. I regret having hurt the city that I love. Out of concern for the city, I immediately resigned my post as Mayor. Today, I have acknowledged being guilty of accepting monies for constituent services, something that should never have been done while serving in elected office. As I have asked of my family and friends, I also ask of you the public: your forgiveness. I understand the anger, frustration and disappointment that my actions have caused. I can only hope that the life that I live from now on will reflect both my remorse and my desire to still make a positive impact upon our city. Finally, I want to express my appreciation to my family and friends, to my legal counsel, the faith community, and to the many people whose expressions of unconditional love and support have been, and continue to be, sources of strength and encouragement.

Cannon was sentenced to 44 months in prison on October 14, 2014. He began serving his sentence at the Federal Correctional Institution, Morgantown, a minimum-security facility in West Virginia, and was originally scheduled for release on January 25, 2018.

After his conviction, Cannon voted early on October 30, 2014, while he was under house arrest. After the vote, which did not count, he told a U.S. District Judge, "I did it without thinking." On March 16, 2016, he pleaded guilty to attempted voter fraud. This did not add time to his sentence.

On September 15, 2016, Cannon was released from prison (serving 22 of the 44 months he was sentenced to.) He officially became an ex-convict on January 25, 2017, as he began two years of supervised release monitored by the Residential Re-Entry Management Office in Raleigh, NC. The RRMO is one of 25 centers around the country that oversee some 200,000 federal inmates that are transitioning back to freedom.

== Attempted return to politics in 2022 ==
On March 4, 2022, Cannon announced an attempt to return to politics by filing to run for an at-large Charlotte City Council seat. After getting his rights restored, Cannon stated that he wanted to start "a new beginning" with a chance for redemption. During the Charlotte Democratic primaries held on May 17, 2022, Cannon finished last with just 12 percent of the Democratic vote for the at-large City Council seat.

Political offices
Preceded by Patsy Kinsey	Mayor of Charlotte; 2013–2014	Succeeded by Dan Clodfelter
