= 2011 Charlotte mayoral election =

- 8 November 2011
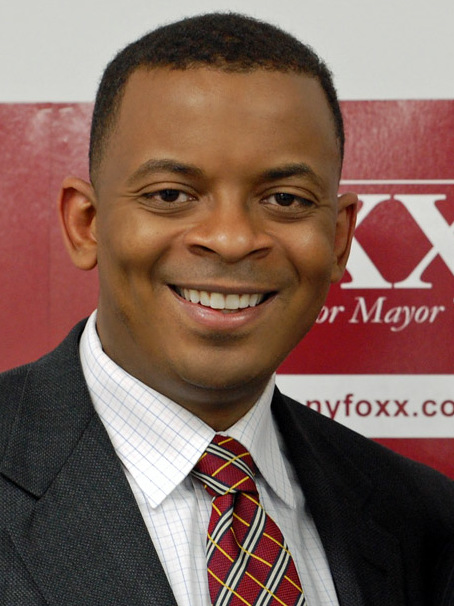

Nominee	Anthony Foxx	Scott Stone
Party	Democratic	Republican
Popular vote	56,252	26,985
Percentage	67.54%	32.40%
Mayor before election
Anthony Foxx
Democratic
Elected mayor
Anthony Foxx
Democratic

The biennial Charlotte mayoral election was held on Tuesday, November 8, 2011. Democratic incumbent Anthony Foxx won re-election.

== Candidates ==
Only two candidates filed to run for the office: Anthony Foxx, Democratic incumbent mayor since 2009, and Republican Scott Stone, vice president of an engineering firm. Since they were the only candidates to file for their respective party's nomination, they faced no primaries.

== Election results ==
Charlotte Mayor General Election 2011
Party	Candidate	Votes	%
Democratic	Anthony Foxx	56,252	67.54
Republican	Scott Stone	26,985	32.40
Independent	Write-in	51	0.06
Total votes		83,288	100.00
