= Michael Barnes (North Carolina politician) =

American politician

Mayor of Charlotte
- Acting
- In office March 26, 2014 – April 9, 2014
- Preceded by: Patrick Cannon
- Succeeded by: Dan Clodfelter

Mayor Pro Tempore of the Charlotte City Council
- In office December 2, 2013 – December 7, 2015
- Preceded by: Patrick Cannon
- Succeeded by: Vi Lyles

Member of the Charlotte City Council
- In office December 2, 2013 – December 7, 2015
- Preceded by: Patrick Cannon/Beth Pickering
- Succeeded by: Julie Eiselt/James Mitchell
- Constituency: at-large
- In office December 5, 2005 – December 2, 2013
- Preceded by: Gregory Phipps
- Succeeded by: Gregory Phipps
- Constituency: district 4

Personal details
- Born: 1970 or 1971 (age 55–56)
- Party: Democratic
- Education: University of North Carolina, Chapel Hill (BA); North Carolina Central University (JD)

Michael Barnes (born 1970/1971) is an American politician and attorney from North Carolina. A member of the Democratic Party, he served as a member of the Charlotte City Council from 2005 to 2013. Barnes served mayor pro tempore from 2013 to 2015, and briefly served as acting mayor of Charlotte in 2014 following the resignation of Patrick Cannon following his arrested on corruption charges. He unsuccessfully ran for mayor of Charlotte in the 2015 election.

== Political career ==
Barnes, an attorney and a member of the Democratic Party, served as a member of the Charlotte City Council representing the District 4 seat for four terms until he was elected to an at-large seat in the 2013 election. Following that election, he was chosen as the new mayor pro tempore by his colleagues.

=== Tenure as acting mayor ===
Barnes became acting mayor for a short time following the resignation of former mayor Patrick Cannon, who was arrested on March 26, 2014, for corruption charges. Barnes immediately became acting mayor upon Cannon's resignation. The City Council was then required to appoint a mayor to serve out the remainder of Cannon's term (through Dec. 2015). On April 7, the council voted to appoint Dan Clodfelter, a state senator, as the new mayor.

=== 2015 mayoral election ===
In 2015, Barnes declined to run for re-election for his City Council seat and instead pursued the Democratic nomination for mayor of Charlotte in 2015. He placed fourth in the primary, losing to former chair of the Mecklenburg County Commission Jennifer Roberts, and left the City Council in December 2015. He was succeed as mayor pro tempore by at-large City Council member Vi Lyles.

== Political views ==
Barnes was characterized as a fiscal conservative by The Charlotte Observer in 2015, with Barnes stating that to "avoid the liberal or conservative label, I tell people I am a moderate. He opposed taxpayer funding for Charlotte's streetcar system.

Political offices
Preceded by Patrick Cannon	Mayor of Charlotte; Acting; 2014	Succeeded by Dan Clodfelter
