= 2017 Charlotte mayoral election =

- November 7, 2017
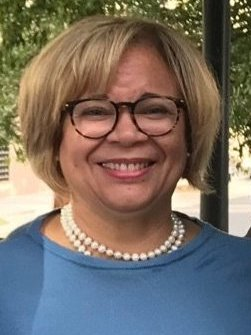

Nominee	Vi Lyles	Kenny Smith
Party	Democratic	Republican
Popular vote	72,073	49,652
Percentage	59.15%	40.75%
- Precinct results Lyles: 50–60% 60–70% 70–80% 80–90% >90% Smith: 50–60% 60–70% 70–80% Tie: 40% No data
Mayor before election
Jennifer Roberts
Democratic
Elected mayor
Vi Lyles
Democratic

The 2017 Charlotte mayoral election took place on Tuesday, November 7, 2017. Party primary elections were held on Tuesday, September 12, 2017. Second-round primaries would have been held on Tuesday, October 10, 2017, if they had been necessary, but both primary winners received more than the minimum 40 percent of the vote needed to avoid a runoff. The incumbent, Democrat Jennifer Roberts, was eligible to run for a second two-year term. She ran but lost the Democratic nomination in the primary in a major upset. Two members of the City Council, Democrat Vi Lyles and Republican Kenny Smith, won the primaries and advanced to face each other in the general election. Vi Lyles defeated Kenny Smith in the general election, and became the 59th mayor of Charlotte, North Carolina.

== Background ==
Jennifer Roberts, a former Mecklenburg County commissioner, was elected to her first term in 2015 when she defeated Republican Edwin Peacock III, a former Charlotte City Councilman.

== Democratic primary ==
=== Candidates ===
==== Declared ====
- Joel Ford, North Carolina state senator
- Vi Lyles, Charlotte City Councilwoman
- Constance Partee-Johnson
- Lucille Puckett
- Jennifer Roberts, incumbent

==== Declined ====
- David Howard, former Charlotte City councilman

=== Endorsements ===
Joel Ford

Organizations

- Charlotte Fire Fighters Association
- Real Estate and Building Industry Coalition
Vi Lyles

Organizations

- Black Political Caucus
- Democracy for America

Newspapers

- The Charlotte Observer
- The Charlotte Post
Jennifer Roberts

Organizations

- Equality NC
- Human Rights Campaign
- MeckPAC
- New South Progressives
- Sierra Club
- Southern Piedmont Central Labor Council
- Unite Here Local 23 North Carolina Chapter

=== Polling ===
Poll source	Date(s) administered	Sample size	Margin of error	Jennifer Roberts (D)	Joel Ford (D)	Vi Lyles (D)	Constance Partee-Johnson (D)	Other	Undecided
Lake Research Partners	June 1–4, 2017	400	± 4.9%	35%	15%	21%	–	–	28%

=== Results ===
Democratic primary results
Party	Candidate	Votes	%
Democratic	Vi Lyles	15,805	46.13%
Democratic	Jennifer Roberts (incumbent)	12,412	36.23%
Democratic	Joel Ford	5,466	15.95%
Democratic	Constance Partee-Johnson	311	0.91%
Democratic	Lucille Puckett	268	0.78%
Total votes		34,262	100.0%

== Republican primary ==
=== Candidates ===
==== Declared ====
- Kimberley Paige Barnette, former magistrate
  - Barnette garnered controversy in September 2017 when her Facebook page briefly described herself as "Republican $ Smart, White, Traditional." The controversy garnered national attention.
- Gary M. Dunn, candidate for Democratic nomination in 2013
- Kenny Smith, Charlotte City councilman

=== Endorsements ===
Kenny Smith

Organizations

- Fraternal Order of Police

Newspapers

- The Charlotte Observer

=== Results ===
Republican primary results
Party	Candidate	Votes	%
Republican	Kenny Smith	7,912	88.63%
Republican	Gary M. Dunn	553	6.19%
Republican	Kimberley Paige Barnette	462	5.18%
Total votes		8,927	100.0%

== General election ==
=== Polling ===
Poll source	Date(s) administered	Sample size	Margin of error	Vi Lyles (D)	Kenny Smith (R)	Undecided
SurveyUSA	October 18–21, 2017	517	± 4.4%	41%	40%	19%

=== Results ===
2017 Charlotte mayoral election
Party	Candidate	Votes	%
Democratic	Vi Lyles	72,073	59.15%
Republican	Kenny Smith	49,652	40.75%
Write-in		132	0.11%
Total votes		121,857	100.0% (Note: The percentage of votes above don't add up to 100% due to rounding.)
Democratic hold			
