= Senator Winner =

Senator Winner may refer to:

- George H. Winner Jr. (born 1949), New York State Senate
- Leslie Winner (born 1950), North Carolina State Senate
