= 2019 Charlotte mayoral election =

- November 5, 2019
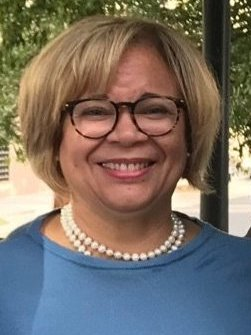

Nominee	Vi Lyles	David Rice
Party	Democratic	Republican
Popular vote	70,624	20,408
Percentage	77.23%	22.32%
- Precinct results Lyles: 50–60% 60–70% 70–80% 80–90% >90% No data
Mayor before election
Vi Lyles
Democratic
Elected mayor
Vi Lyles
Democratic

The 2019 mayoral election in Charlotte, North Carolina, was held on Tuesday, November 5, 2019. A primary was held on September 10, 2019. A primary runoff, if needed, would have been October 8, 2019, but one was not needed because incumbent Mayor Vi Lyles handily won the Democratic primary. The filing deadline for this election was July 19, 2019. the Mayor Lyles, first elected for a two-year term in 2017, was eligible to seek re-election. She was re-elected in a landslide over Republican David Rice.

== Democratic primary ==
=== Candidates ===
==== Declared ====
- Roderick Davis
- Vi Lyles, incumbent Mayor
- Tigress Sydney Acute McDaniel
- Joel Odom
- Lucille Puckett

==== Primary results ====
Democratic primary results
Party	Candidate	Votes	%
Democratic	Vi Lyles (incumbent)	60,089	86.61
Democratic	Roderick Davis	2,945	4.24
Democratic	Lucille Puckett	2,894	4.17
Democratic	Joel Odom	2,526	3.64
Democratic	Tigress Sydney Acute McDaniel	924	1.33
Total votes		69,378	100

== Republican primary ==
=== Candidates ===
==== Declared ====
- David Michael Rice

== General election ==
=== Results ===
Charlotte mayoral election, 2019
Party	Candidate	Votes	%
Democratic	Vi Lyles (incumbent)	70,624	77.23
Republican	David Michael Rice	20,408	22.32
Total votes		91,032	100
Democratic hold			
