= E. McA. Currie =

American politician

40th Mayor of Charlotte, North Carolina
- In office 1941–1943
- Preceded by: Ben Elbert Douglas, Sr.
- Succeeded by: Herbert Hill Baxter

Personal details
- Born: May 12, 1892 Fayetteville, North Carolina
- Died: February 12, 1965 (aged 72) Charlotte, North Carolina
- Party: Democratic

Ernest McArthur Currie (May 12, 1892 – February 12, 1965) was an American politician. He served as mayor of Charlotte, North Carolina from 1941 to 1943. He was born in Fayetteville, North Carolina to Duncan Black and Katherine Lee (née McArthur) Currie. Currie attended the University of Paris, Davidson College (1916) and the University of North Carolina at Chapel Hill and earned a law degree. He also served in World War I. He was defeated by Herbert Hill Baxter in 1943 for the mayor's seat.
