= Herbert Baxter =

Herbert Baxter may refer to:

- Herbert James Baxter (1900–1974), British judge, intelligence officer and politician
- Herbert Hill Baxter (1894–1967), mayor of Charlotte, North Carolina
