= F. Marion Redd =

American judge

Francis Marion Redd (1871–1956) was an American politician. He was Mayor of Charlotte, North Carolina, from 1927 to 1929.

Redd was born on August 8, 1871, in Onslow County, North Carolina. He graduated from the University of North Carolina at Chapel Hill in 1905 and married Bessie Lee Flowe in 1919.

In 1927 Redd was elected as the mayor of Charlotte, serving one term. He worked to improve the cities roads as driving become more popular. He began the policy of licensing drivers as a way to ensure people were fit to drive, ended all double parking downtown and passed laws limiting how long people could park uptown. Redd also fought to collect back taxes owed the city as a way to increase the city budget. He also successfully lobbied for Charlotte to be the meeting place of the 39th United Confederate Veterans Reunion. Redd also laid the groundwork in the city budget for the Charlotte Douglas Airport to eventually be constructed. Redd was very concerned with public welfare and morality during his term. He supported arresting loafers downtown if they would not leave the streets and also declared that sexually graphic films were not to be shown in public movie theaters after 9 pm. Redd is also remembered for the special census he implemented in 1928 to study the growth of the city and the ensure an accurate population count. The census was successful in that it showed 22,000 more people than what had been reported on the 1927 census. After the census Charlotte became the largest city in the state, surpassing Winston-Salem.

In July 1935 Redd was appointed judge of the Domestic Relations and Juvenile Courts of Charlotte and Mecklenburg County. He served on the court until his retirement in June 1949.

Redd died on November 14, 1956, in Charlotte.
