= 2009 Charlotte mayoral election =

- 3 November 2009
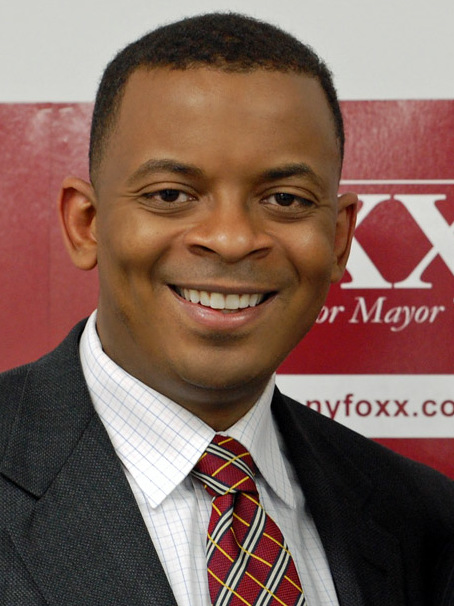

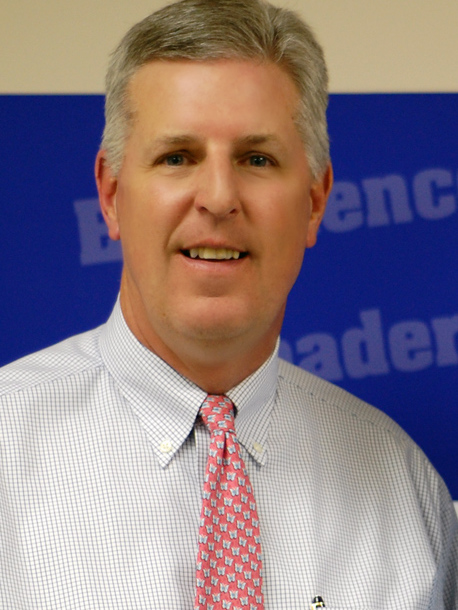
Nominee	Anthony Foxx	John Lassiter
Party	Democratic	Republican
Popular vote	55,080	51,841
Percentage	51.48%	48.45%
Mayor before election
Pat McCrory
Republican
Elected mayor
Anthony Foxx
Democratic

The biennial Charlotte mayoral election was held on November 3, 2009. The seat was open due to the decision by Mayor Pat McCrory, a Republican, not to seek re-election. Democrat Anthony Foxx, a member of the City Council, won the election by a slim margin, becoming the first Democrat elected to lead the city since Harvey Gantt was re-elected in 1985.

== Candidates ==
=== Democrats ===
==== Announced ====
- Anthony Foxx, City Council member

==== Not Running ====
- Malcolm Graham, member of the North Carolina Senate
- Craig Madans, 2003/2005 Democratic nominee for mayor

=== Republicans ===
==== Announced ====
- John Lassiter, City Council member
- Martin Davis
- Jack Stratton

== Primary election results ==
Candidates		Democratic Primary Election
Candidate	Party	Notes
Anthony Foxx	Democratic	Unopposed

Candidates		Republican Primary Election ( 4.33% turnout) - Sept. 15	
Candidate	Party	Votes	Percent
John Lassiter	Republican	8,516	79.54%
Martin Davis	Republican	2,031	18.97%
Jack Stratton	Republican	159	1.49%

== General election results ==
Candidates		General Election ( 21% turnout) - Nov. 3	
Candidate	Party	Votes	Percent
John Lassiter	Republican	51,841	48.45%
Anthony Foxx	Democratic	55,080	51.48%

== Polling ==
=== Foxx (D) v. Lassiter (R) ===
Poll Source	Dates Administered	Anthony Foxx (D)	John Lassiter (R)
Public Policy Polling	November 2, 2009	46%	50%
Public Policy Polling	October 26, 2009	45%	45%
Public Policy Polling	August 11, 2009	43%	44%
