= 2005 Charlotte mayoral election =

- 8 November 2005
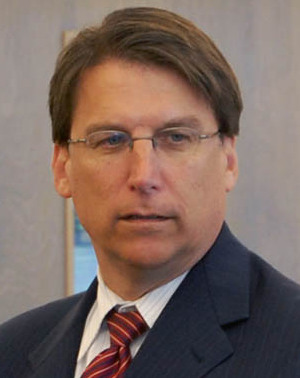

| Nominee | Pat McCrory | Craig Madans |
| Party | Republican | Democratic |
| Popular vote | 41,868 | 32,021 |
| Percentage | 53.83% | 41.17% |
Mayor before election
Pat McCrory
Republican
Elected mayor
Pat McCrory
Republican

The Charlotte mayoral election of 2005 was held on 8 November 2005 to elect a Mayor of Charlotte, North Carolina. It was won by Republican incumbent Pat McCrory, who won a sixth consecutive term by defeating Democratic nominee Craig Madans in the general election.

== Primaries ==
=== Republican primary ===
2005 Charlotte mayoral election – Republican primary
| Party | Candidate | Votes | % | ±% |
|---|---|---|---|---|
| Republican | Pat McCrory (incumbent) | 7,337 | 73.75 | |
| Republican | Martin Davis | 2,549 | 25.62 | |
| Republican | Others | 63 | 0.63 | |
| Turnout | | 9,949 | 4.76 | |

=== Democratic primary ===
Craig Madans won the Democratic nomination unopposed.

== General election ==
2005 Charlotte mayoral election
| Party | Candidate | Votes | % | ±% |
|---|---|---|---|---|
| Republican | Pat McCrory (incumbent) | 41,868 | 53.83 | |
| Democratic | Craig Madans | 32,021 | 41.17 | |
| Other | Others | 3,888 | 5.00 | |
| Turnout | | 77,777 | 19.67 | |
