= Rob Harrington =

American politician

Mayor of Charlotte
- Incumbent
- Assumed office July 1, 2026
- Preceded by: Vi Lyles

Personal details
- Born: Robert Harrington; 1962 or 1963 (age 63–64)
- Party: Democratic
- Education: Duke University (BA, JD)

Robert E. Harrington (born 1962/1963) is an American politician. He succeeded Vi Lyles as Mayor of Charlotte on July 1, 2026 and will serve until the next election in 2027. He graduated from Duke University with his bachelor's in 1984 and his Juris Doctor degree in 1987.

Political offices
Preceded by Vi Lyles	Mayor of Charlotte; 2026–present	Incumbent
