= 2022 Charlotte mayoral election =

- July 26, 2022
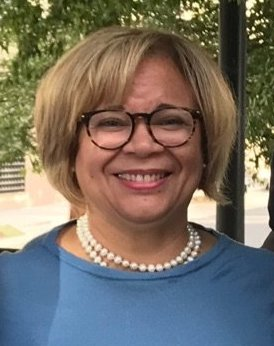

| Nominee | Vi Lyles | Stephanie de Sarachaga-Bilbao |
| Party | Democratic | Republican |
| Popular vote | 49,324 | 22,580 |
| Percentage | 68.42% | 31.32% |
- Lyles: 50–60% 60–70% 70–80% 80–90% ≥90% de Sarachaga-Bilbao: 50–60% 60–70% Tie: 50% No data
Mayor before election
Vi Lyles
Democratic
Elected Mayor
Vi Lyles
Democratic

The 2022 mayoral election in Charlotte, North Carolina was held on July 26, 2022. This reflected a delay from the original schedule of the election, which would ordinarily have taken place in November 2021. Delays in the United States Census prompted delays for cities in the state that elect city council members by district in odd-numbered years. Charlotte's City Council had the option of holding the mayoral election on schedule in 2021, but voted to hold all elections at the same time.

Charlotte's partisan primaries were held on May 17, the same day as the North Carolina statewide primary.

The incumbent mayor, Democrat Vi Lyles, was first elected in 2017 and re-elected in 2019. She sought re-election to a third term and easily defeated Republican Stephanie de Sarachaga-Bilbao.

== Democratic primary ==
=== Candidates ===
==== Nominee ====
- Vi Lyles, incumbent mayor

==== Eliminated in primary ====
- Tigress Sydney Acute McDaniel
- Tae McKenzie
- Lucille Puckett

=== Primary results ===
Democratic primary results by precinct Lyles: 60–70%; 70–80%; 80–90%; ≥90%; No data: No data

Democratic primary results
| Party | Candidate | Votes | % |
|---|---|---|---|
| Democratic | Vi Lyles (incumbent) | 48,569 | 84.11 |
| Democratic | Lucille Puckett | 4,275 | 7.40 |
| Democratic | Tigress Sydney Acute McDaniel | 2,614 | 4.53 |
| Democratic | Tae McKenzie | 2,286 | 3.96 |
| Total votes | | 57,744 | 100.00 |

== Republican primary ==
=== Candidates ===
==== Nominee ====
- Stephanie de Sarachaga-Bilbao

==== Eliminated in primary ====
- M. Moustafa

=== Primary results ===
Republican primary results by precinct de Sarachaga-Bilbao: 50–60%; 60–70%; 70–80%; 80–90%; ≥90%; Moustafa: 50–60%; 60–70%; 80–90%; Tie: 50%; No data: No data

Republican primary results
| Party | Candidate | Votes | % |
|---|---|---|---|
| Republican | Stephanie de Sarachaga-Bilbao | 15,624 | 70.42 |
| Republican | M. Moustafa | 6,562 | 29.58 |
| Total votes | | 22,186 | 100.00 |

== General election ==
=== Results ===
2022 Charlotte mayoral election
| Party | Candidate | Votes | % |
|---|---|---|---|
| Democratic | Vi Lyles (incumbent) | 49,324 | 68.42 |
| Republican | Stephanie de Sarachaga-Bilbao | 22,580 | 31.32 |
| Write-in | | 186 | 0.26 |
| Total votes | | 72,090 | 100.00 |
| Democratic hold | | | |
