= Patsy Kinsey =

American politician (born 1941)

55th Mayor of Charlotte
- In office July 1, 2013 – December 2, 2013
- Preceded by: Anthony Foxx
- Succeeded by: Patrick Cannon

Member of the Charlotte City Council
- In office December 2, 2013 – December 4, 2017
- In office 2003 – July 1, 2013

Member of the Mecklenburg County Board of Commissioners
- In office 1990–1994

Personal details
- Born: 1941 (age 84–85)
- Party: Democratic

Patsy Kinsey (born 1941) is a former American politician and member of the Democratic Party who served as the Mayor of Charlotte, North Carolina for five months in 2013. She served out the remainder of the term of former Mayor Anthony Foxx, who resigned to become United States Secretary of Transportation. Kinsey is the second woman to serve as Mayor of Charlotte.

A Democrat, Kinsey served as a Mecklenburg County commissioner from 1990 to 1994. She was then elected as a member of the Charlotte City Council from District 1 for five consecutive terms, from 2003 until the Council elected her Mayor on July 1, 2013, minutes after Foxx resigned from office. North Carolina state law required that Foxx's appointed successor be of the same political party. Both Kinsey and Foxx are members of the Democratic Party and Democrats held a 9-2 majority on the city council in July 2013. Five Democratic city council members and one Republican member, Warren Cooksey, voted for Kinsey. Two Democratic council members, Beth Pickering and Claire Fallon, voted against Kinsey. Three other council members - Republican Andy Dulin and Democrats Patrick Cannon and Michael Barnes - missed the meeting and did not vote.

Kinsey was sworn in as Mayor on July 1, 2013, the same day as her election. She resigned from her seat on the city council as part of the agreement to become mayor, which included the understanding that she would not stand in the mayoral election in November. She instead ran to reclaim her former District 1 city council seat in the November 2013 election. She was elected with only write-in opposition, and resumed her service as a regular council member in December 2013, while Patrick Cannon took office as Mayor.

Kinsey was named Charlotte's 2013 Woman of the Year by The Charlotte Observer in February 2014.

Political offices
Preceded by Anthony Foxx	Mayor of Charlotte; 2013	Succeeded by Patrick Cannon
