= 2013 Charlotte mayoral election =

- 5 November 2013
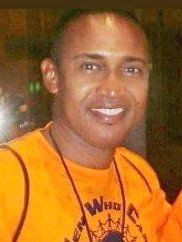

Nominee	Patrick Cannon	Edwin Peacock III
Party	Democratic	Republican
Popular vote	51,310	45,036
Percentage	53.06%	46.74%
Mayor before election
Patsy Kinsey
Democratic
Elected mayor
Patrick Cannon
Democratic

The biennial Charlotte mayoral election was held on Tuesday, November 5, 2013. Primary elections were held on Tuesday, September 10, 2013. Unaffiliated voters were allowed to vote in either the Democratic or Republican primary.

On July 2, 2013, Anthony Foxx, a Democrat, announced that he would resign as mayor to become United States Secretary of Transportation. District 1 city councilperson Patsy Kinsey, also a Democrat, was named interim mayor the same day with the understanding that she would not stand in the mayoral election in November. Kinsey instead ran to regain the council seat she had vacated.

Democratic Party nominee Patrick Cannon, another member of the city council, won the general election to become the 55th mayor of Charlotte. However, only under four months into his term, on March 26, 2014, Cannon was arrested by the FBI on charges of accepting bribes (to which he later pleaded guilty) and resigned later that day, prompting the City Council to elect Dan Clodfelter to serve for the remainder of Cannon's term as the 57th Mayor of Charlotte.

== Candidates ==
=== Democratic ===
- Mayor Pro Tempore/City Council member Patrick Cannon
- Gary Mitchell Dunn
- City Council member James Mitchell, Jr.
- Lucille Puckett

==== Declined ====
- Mayor Anthony Foxx, a Democrat, declined to run for a third term in 2013 and was then appointed United States Secretary of Transportation by President Barack Obama.
- Interim Mayor Patsy Kinsey

=== Republican ===
- Former City Councilman Edwin Peacock III
- David Michael Rice

== Results ==
=== Primaries ===
Candidates		Democratic Primary Election - Sept. 10	
Candidate	Party	Votes	Percent
Patrick Cannon	Democratic	14,025	55.70%
James "Smuggie" Mitchell	Democratic	9,956	39.54%
Gary Dunn	Democratic	631	2.51%
Lucille Puckett	Democratic	567	2.25%

Candidates		Republican Primary Election - Sept. 10	
Candidate	Party	Votes	Percent
Edwin Peacock III	Republican	8,289	92.06%
David Michael Rice	Republican	715	7.94%

=== General election ===
Candidates		General Election - Nov. 5	
Candidate	Party	Votes	Percent
Patrick Cannon	Democratic	51,310	53.06%
Edwin B. Peacock III	Republican	45,036	46.74%
