= Leslie Winner =

American politician

Leslie J. Winner

Member of the North Carolina Senate from the 40th district
- In office 1993–1999
- Preceded by: Constituency established
- Succeeded by: Dan Clodfelter

Personal details
- Born: October 24, 1950 (age 75) Asheville, North Carolina
- Party: Democratic
- Spouse: Gerald Postema
- Children: 1
- Education: Brown University (AB); Northeastern University (JD)

Leslie J. Winner is a North Carolina attorney and former executive director of the Winston-Salem-based Z. Smith Reynolds Foundation. At the time of her selection to succeed Thomas W. Ross at the foundation, Winner was general counsel and vice president for the University of North Carolina system.

== Thornburg v. Gingles ==
Interested in securing voting rights for African Americans, Winner represented the respondent Gingles in Thornburg v. Gingles (1986), a Supreme Court case in which the court unanimously ruled that the state of North Carolina illegally weakened the voting power of African-Americans in Mecklenburg and five other legislative districts.

== Z. Smith Reynolds Foundation ==
In February 2013, Winner said that she was "surprised and disappointed" by a politically charged memo distributed by Blueprint North Carolina, a Reynolds Foundation grantee and 501(c)(3) tax-exempt organization."(Z. Smith Reynolds) believes in robust debate on issues of public importance, (it) does not support attacking people," Winner said. "We were disappointed to learn that Blueprint is advocating this strategy…We are taking this seriously. We are determining our options and our obligations. We will get to the bottom of it."

The memo in question recommended "crippling" Republican leaders in the N.C. governor's office and legislature. It also suggested that GOP leaders be "eviscerated" and that Republican Gov. Pat McCrory be slammed "when he contradicts his promises."

== Early life and education ==
Winner was born in Asheville, NC, on October 24, 1950. She received the A.B. degree from Brown University and the J.D. degree from Northeastern University School of Law. She served six years (three terms) in the North Carolina Senate, representing part of Mecklenburg County as a Democrat. She is Jewish.

== Awards and honours ==
Winner has also been awarded the Order of the Long Leaf Pine. It is, according to the Order of the Long Leaf Pine, "Among the most sought after and valued awards conferred by the Governor of North Carolina is The Order of the Long Leaf Pine, which is presented to outstanding North Carolinian's who have a proven record of service to the State. Persons who have demonstrated a lifetime of service to the State may qualify."

Winner is currently on the boards of The Well of Mercy, the Jewish Heritage Society, and Made in Durham. In the past, she has served on the Board of Trustees for UNC Asheville and the UNC Charlotte Foundation.

North Carolina Senate
Preceded by Constituency established	Member of the North Carolina Senate from the 40th district 1993-1999	Succeeded by Dan Clodfelter
