= Ben Elbert Douglas Sr. =

American politician

Mayor of Charlotte, North Carolina
- In office 1935–1941
- Preceded by: Arthur E. Wearn
- Succeeded by: E. McA. Currie

Personal details
- Born: September 3, 1894 Iredell County, North Carolina
- Died: July 27, 1981 (aged 86) Charlotte, North Carolina
- Resting place: Elmwood Cemetery
- Party: Democratic

Benjamin Elbert Douglas Sr. (September 3, 1894 – July 27, 1981) was the mayor of Charlotte, North Carolina from 1935 to 1941. He administered the construction of an airport for Charlotte. Charlotte Douglas International Airport, as the airport is named today, was named after him in 1954. He also used New Deal funds to complete American Legion Memorial Stadium and to establish Charlotte Memorial Hospital, later renamed Carolinas Medical Center. A Democrat, he was also the first mayor of Charlotte who was directly elected by voters pursuant to a change in the city charter.

== Biography ==
Douglas was born in Iredell County, North Carolina on September 3, 1894. He served in the United States Army during World War I.

In 1946 Ben Douglas founded Douglas Furs, after Franklin D. Roosevelt asked a personal favor of Ben Sr. – to find a way to clean the fleece-lined fur-trimmed flight jackets for the soldiers flying in the then current war in Europe. He used his knowledge gained in the dry cleaning business (he owned one in Charlotte prior) and his ingenuity gained him a government contract and later a thriving business in the fur trade. Douglas also was the relentless lobbyist for the now well-traveled Independence Boulevard. Mary Louise Douglas (his widow) continued to work at Douglas Furs 3 days a week until her death on December 29, 2007. The store is lined with historical text, newspaper articles of his election, and pictures of Ben and his accomplishments.

Douglas directed the North Carolina Department of Conservation and Development from 1953 to 1955. In 1956, Douglas unsuccessfully ran for Congress.
