= Dan Clodfelter =

American politician (born 1950)

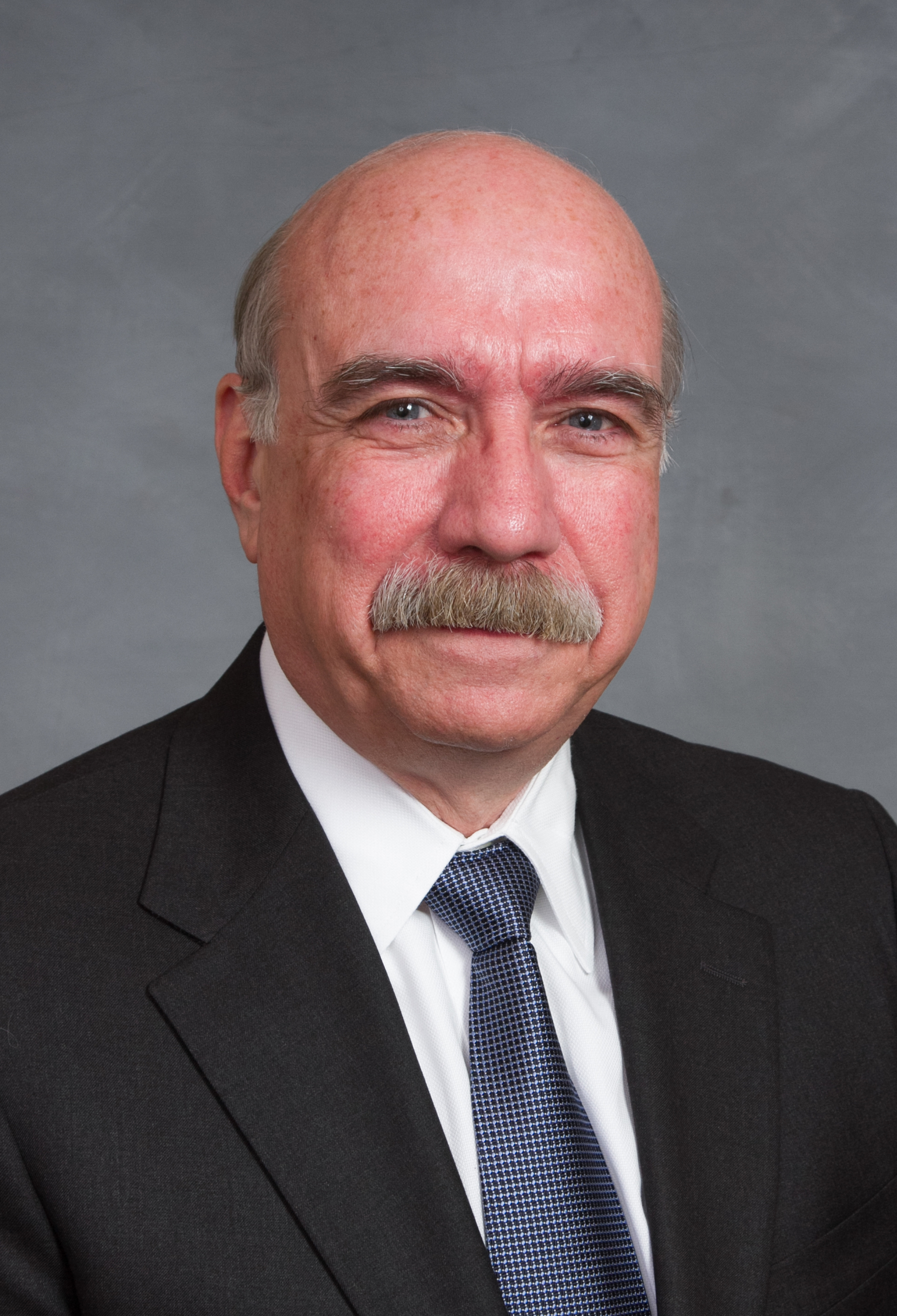
- Official portrait, 2013

57th Mayor of Charlotte
- In office April 9, 2014 – December 7, 2015
- Preceded by: Michael Barnes (acting)
- Succeeded by: Jennifer Roberts

Member of the North Carolina Senate
- In office January 1, 1999 – April 8, 2014
- Preceded by: Leslie Winner
- Succeeded by: Jeff Jackson
- Constituency: 40th district (1999–2003); 37th district (2003–2014)

Personal details
- Born: June 2, 1950 (age 76) Thomasville, North Carolina, U.S.
- Party: Democratic
- Spouse: Elizabeth
- Children: 2
- Education: Davidson College (BA); Corpus Christi College, Oxford (BA); Yale University (JD)

Daniel G. Clodfelter (born June 2, 1950) is an American politician and attorney from North Carolina. He served as a Democratic member of the North Carolina General Assembly representing the State's thirty-seventh Senate district, which includes constituents in Mecklenburg County, from January 1999 through April 8, 2014, when he resigned after being appointed Mayor of Charlotte, North Carolina.

== Education and legal career ==
Clodfelter was born in Thomasville, North Carolina and graduated from Thomasville Senior High School, after attending one of the first sessions of the Governor's School of North Carolina in 1966. He earned a bachelor's degree from Davidson College, where he was a brother of Sigma Phi Epsilon fraternity.

In 1972 and was named a Rhodes Scholar and earned another bachelor's degree from Corpus Christi College, Oxford in 1974. He then attended the Yale Law School, earning his J.D. degree in 1977. Clodfelter served as a law clerk for Judge James B. McMillan of the U.S. District Court for the Western District of N.C. from 1977–78, after which he entered private practice in Charlotte.

== Political career ==
Clodfelter served as a member of the Charlotte City Council, representing District One (East Charlotte) from 1987 to 1993. Clodfelter was elected to the North Carolina Senate in 1998 and for many years served as Co-Chair of the powerful Senate Finance Committee and as Vice Chair of the Judiciary One Committee. Clodfelter has been a Trustee of the Z. Smith Reynolds Foundation since 1982.

=== Mayor of Charlotte ===
After Charlotte Mayor Patrick Cannon resigned from his office on 26 March 2014, several members of the Charlotte City Council expressed their support for Clodfelter to fill out Cannon's term. His appointment as mayor was endorsed by The Charlotte Observer. On April 7, 2014, the City Council appointed Clodfelter as mayor. He resigned as a member of the North Carolina Senate on April 8, and was sworn in as mayor of Charlotte on April 9. He ran for a full term in 2015 but was defeated in the primary by Jennifer Roberts.

== Family ==
Daniel Clodfelter is married to Elizabeth K. Bevan; they have two adult children.

== See also ==
- List of mayors of the largest 50 US cities

Political offices
Preceded by Michael Barnes; Acting	Mayor of Charlotte; 2014–2015	Succeeded by Jennifer Roberts
