= Herbert Hill Baxter =

American politician (1894–1967)

- Born: May 31, 1894; Boston, Massachusetts
- Died: October 26, 1967 (aged 73); Charlotte, North Carolina

Herbert Hill Baxter was a politician and Mayor of Charlotte, North Carolina.

Herbert Hill Baxter was born on May 31, 1894, in Boston, MA. He graduated from the University of Massachusetts Amherst in 1918. He served in the US Army Infantry during World War I where he was commissioned as a second lieutenant. Part of his training was conducted at Camp Greene in Charlotte. In 1925 Baxter returned to Charlotte and organized Central Lumber Company. He was president of the company until it closed in 1958.

Baxter became interested in local politics in 1935. He was elected to the Charlotte City Council from 1935 to 1941, and 1951–1959. In 1943, he defeated E McAurther Currie to become Charlotte's mayor. He was reelected in 1945 and 1947. During his terms as mayor, Baxter established a planning board and called for progressive city growth. He launched a sale of bonds to finance the cities Program for Progress. During his administration the city acquired Morris Field from the US Air Force which would be used for airport expansion, developed and adopted heath, housing, and zoning ordinances, created ABC legislation, began the construction of a cross town highway, established a city employee retirement system and created the department of Traffic Engineering. In 1949 he was defeated by Victor Shaw. After his term as mayor, Baxter continued to work with the city, primarily as vice chair of the Charlotte Redevelopment Commission.

Baxter was also active in community organizations including the Masons, Lions Club, Myers Park Country Club, Charlotte Mecklenburg Boy Scouts, and Charlotte Symphony Orchestra. he helped found the Charlotte City Club in 1947 and served as its first president. He served as commander of the Civil Air Patrol's North Carolina Wing from 1950–1953.
