= Jennifer Roberts (politician) =

American politician

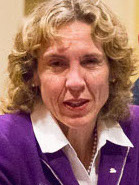

58th Mayor of Charlotte
- In office December 7, 2015 – December 4, 2017
- Preceded by: Dan Clodfelter
- Succeeded by: Vi Lyles

Personal details
- Born: Jennifer Watson; April 18, 1960 (age 66) Raleigh, North Carolina, U.s.
- Party: Democratic
- Spouse: Manley Roberts
- Children: 2
- Education: University of North Carolina, Chapel Hill (BA); University of Toronto (MA); Johns Hopkins University (MA)
- Website: Campaign website

Jennifer Roberts (born April 18, 1960) is an American politician, businesswoman and former diplomat who served as the 58th mayor of Charlotte, North Carolina. She was elected on November 3, 2015 having previously served four terms on the Mecklenburg County Board of Commissioners. In 2012, she was the Democratic nominee for the United States House of Representatives in North Carolina's 9th congressional district.

== Biography ==
Roberts graduated from East Mecklenburg High School in 1978, and went on to attend the University of North Carolina at Chapel Hill on a Morehead Scholarship. Roberts earned two master's degrees in international affairs from Johns Hopkins University and from the University of Toronto.

She worked as a diplomat for four years with the United States Department of State, serving in the Dominican Republic as a consular officer and then as a political officer on the Mexico desk before returning to Charlotte.

During her years in Charlotte, Roberts has been director of the Mayor’s International Cabinet, a lending officer in international corporate banking at First Union, and executive director of the Charlotte World Affairs Council.

She is the first person to be elected to serve as both Chairman of the Mecklenburg County Commission and later as Mayor of Charlotte.

While Chair of the Mecklenburg County Commission (2006-2011), Roberts was instrumental in creating a public/private partnership to build a new shelter in Charlotte for survivors of domestic violence. During her tenure as Mayor of Charlotte she spearheaded the creation of Charlotte NEXT, an initiative dedicated to improving after school programs for at-risk teens. During her tenure as Mayor, the City of Charlotte set a goal of funding 5,000 affordable housing units over 3 years and is currently (2018) on track to exceed that goal.

Roberts has been a life-long advocate for clean air and water and for environmental justice. While Chair of the Mecklenburg County Commission, she championed a Park and Rec Master Plan, supported energy reduction and conservation in County operations, and headed a Clean Air Works initiative to reduce carbon emissions in area businesses and the County’s carbon footprint. As mayor, she signed the Mayor’s Climate Pledge and introduced a Clean Energy Resolution for the City of Charlotte.

Roberts is a recipient of the Maya Angelou Women Who Lead award, the National Association of Women Business Owners’ Public Policy Leader of the Year award, and Equality North Carolina’s Ally of the Year award. She and her husband Manley live in Charlotte. They have two children.

Roberts has served on the boards of ArtsTeach, the Centralina Council of Governments, the Charlotte Chamber, the Girl Scouts Hornets' Nest Council, Keep Mecklenburg Beautiful, and the Women’s Commission. She currently works as a business consultant and serves on numerous community boards and commissions, including the Corporate Climate Alliance, NC Climate Solutions Coalition, Meck Ed and Mecklenburg Ministries.

Roberts is a volunteer on children’s issues, alleviating poverty and homelessness, and environmental protection.

== 2012 Congressional campaign ==
In 2012, Roberts ran for election to the U.S. House of Representatives to represent North Carolina's 9th congressional district. Roberts won the nomination on the Democratic ticket after running unopposed in the primary. Roberts was looking to replace incumbent Republican Sue Myrick, who retired in 2012. Roberts was defeated by former state senator Robert Pittenger on November 6, 2012. Despite her loss, the race was the most competitive that the 9th district had seen in over a quarter-century. The 9th had been one of the first districts in North Carolina to turn Republican; it and its predecessors have been in GOP hands since 1953.

North Carolina 9th Congressional District 2012
Party	Candidate	Votes	%
Republican	Robert Pittenger	194,537	51.78
Democratic	Jennifer Roberts	171,503	45.65
Libertarian	Curtis Campbell	9,650	2.57
Total votes		375,690	100.0

== Charlotte mayoral election, 2015 ==
The 2015 biennial Charlotte mayoral election took place on November 3, 2015. Primary elections were held on September 15, 2015, with primary runoffs held on October 6, as no candidate cleared the 40% threshold. Roberts defeated incumbent Dan Clodfelter in the primary and faced Republican Edwin Peacock III in the general election. Roberts defeated Peacock with just over 52% of the vote. She took office in December 2015.

== Charlotte mayoral election, 2017 ==
Roberts lost in the September 12, 2017 Democratic primary to Vi Lyles. Lyles went on to win the general election against Republican Kenny Smith.

Political offices
Preceded by Dan Clodfelter	Mayor of Charlotte; 2015–2017	Succeeded by Vi Lyles
