= Anthony Foxx =

American politician and lawyer (born 1971)

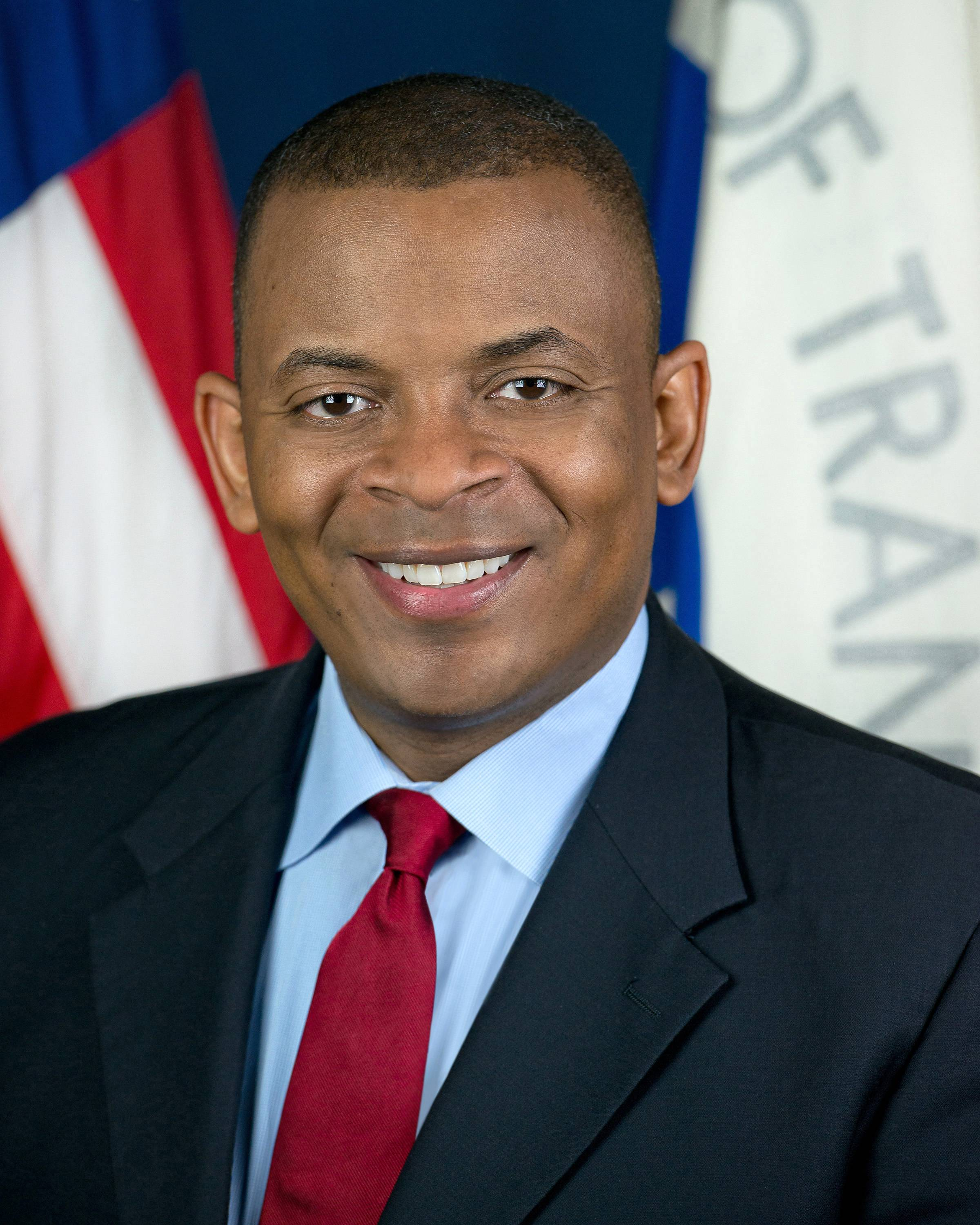

17th United States Secretary of Transportation
- In office July 2, 2013 – January 20, 2017
- President: Barack Obama
- Deputy: John Porcari; Victor Mendez
- Preceded by: Ray LaHood
- Succeeded by: Elaine Chao

54th Mayor of Charlotte
- In office December 7, 2009 – July 1, 2013
- Preceded by: Pat McCrory
- Succeeded by: Patsy Kinsey

Personal details
- Born: Anthony Renard Foxx; April 30, 1971 (age 55) Charlotte, North Carolina, U.S.
- Party: Democratic
- Spouse: Samara Ryder (m. 2001)
- Children: 2
- Education: Davidson College (BA); New York University (JD)

Anthony Renard Foxx (born April 30, 1971) is an American lawyer and politician who served as the United States Secretary of Transportation from 2013 to 2017. A member of the Democratic Party, Foxx had previously served as Mayor of Charlotte, North Carolina from 2009 to 2013. First elected to the Charlotte City Council in 2005, his 2009 mayoral victory made him the youngest person to serve as Charlotte's mayor, as well as the second African American to hold the role.

Foxx was nominated to the position of Secretary of Transportation by President Barack Obama in April 2013. He went on to be confirmed in a 100–0 vote in June 2013. Upon taking office, he became the youngest Cabinet secretary serving at the time. After leaving office, Foxx joined rideshare company Lyft as chief policy officer in 2018. Foxx left his role as chief policy officer in October 2021, but continued to serve as an advisor to the company.

He currently serves as the chair of the Board of Trustees of Davidson College.

== Early life ==
Foxx was born on April 30, 1971, in Charlotte, North Carolina. He was raised by his mother, Laura Foxx, and his grandparents, James and Mary Foxx, pursued education at Piedmont Open IB Middle School, and graduated from West Charlotte High School. He graduated from Davidson College in 1993, where he was the first African American student body president. Foxx majored in history, and went on to earn a J.D. from New York University School of Law in 1996.

== Legal career ==
After law school, Foxx returned to Charlotte to work for a short time at the Smith, Helms, Mullis, and Moore law firm, and left to become a clerk for Judge Nathaniel R. Jones of the Sixth Circuit Court of Appeals in Cincinnati. Later he worked for the United States Department of Justice and the United States House of Representatives Judiciary Committee. In 2004, he was the campaign manager for Representative Mel Watt.

In 2001, he returned to Charlotte to work as a business litigator for Hunton & Williams. While a member of the city council, he retained his position as a litigator at Hunton & Williams, switching to part-time status.

== Political career ==
=== Municipal government ===
Foxx was first elected to the Charlotte City Council in 2005 to an at-large seat, and was re-elected in 2007. He won election as Charlotte's 54th and youngest mayor in 2009 and was re-elected in 2011; he became the city's first Democratic mayor since Harvey Gantt left office in 1987.

Upon becoming mayor, Foxx faced Charlotte's worst recession in more than 80 years. As the nation's second largest financial services center, the city lost more than 25,000 jobs in the recession. Foxx reformed the city's public safety pay plan and developed a demand-driven approach to workforce development that has become a national model. Foxx also announced the creation of more than 4,000 new jobs, which was 19,000 jobs short of what was lost on his watch. He hosted a series of town hall meetings with unemployed workers, pushed for changes to the city's small business loan program, and pressed White House officials for economic recovery spending measures.

From a transportation perspective, Foxx helped salvage the city's largest single capital project: The Blue Line Extension, which was threatened by lower than anticipated sales tax revenue.

=== Secretary of Transportation ===
On April 29, 2013, President Barack Obama announced that he would nominate Foxx to the post of the Secretary of Transportation. On June 27, 2013, the Senate confirmed the nomination by a unanimous vote. Foxx resigned from his elected position as mayor to accept the federal appointment.

Foxx prepared and advocated for the Obama administration's first surface transportation bill, the Grow America Act, in 2014, and worked to get its congressional incarnation, the FAST Act, passed. He consolidated the department's financing programs and accelerated permitting policies. Foxx also put forth new rules governing the commercial use of drones, blueprinted a comprehensive national policy on autonomous vehicles, and launched the Department's first Smart City Challenge, engaging more than 70 cities to develop their own strategies to incorporate new technologies into their transportation networks.

Foxx was the designated survivor for the 2015 State of the Union Address on January 20, 2015.

== Private sector career ==
Foxx joined Lyft in October 2018 as the company's chief policy officer. In that role, he advocated for California's Proposition 22, which maintained the independent contractor status of gig workers while also providing, for the first time, a minimum earnings standard for drivers, as well as access to health care, retirement and other benefits previously prohibited by independent contracting laws. The measure left open the question of whether drivers could organize. He stepped down from the chief policy officer role in October 2021, but he remained with Lyft as a senior advisor.

Foxx joined the faculty of the Harvard Kennedy School, Harvard University's school of public policy and government, in September 2023 as Emma Bloomberg Professor of the Practice of Public Leadership. In January 2024, it was announced that Foxx would succeed former Massachusetts governor Deval Patrick as co-director of the Kennedy School's Center for Public Leadership. He is set to take over the role in July 2024. On January 1, 2025, he became the Director of the Center for Public Leadership.

== Personal life ==
Foxx is married to Samara Ryder, who is also an attorney. They have a daughter and a son.

== See also ==
- List of African-American United States Cabinet members

Political offices
Preceded by Pat McCrory	Mayor of Charlotte; 2009–2013	Succeeded by Patsy Kinsey
Preceded by Ray LaHood	United States Secretary of Transportation; 2013–2017	Succeeded by Elaine Chao
U.S. order of precedence (ceremonial)
Preceded by Penny Pritzker as Former U.S. Cabinet Member	Order of precedence of the United States as Former U.S. Cabinet Member	Succeeded by Tom Perez as Former U.S. Cabinet Member
