= Vi Lyles =

Mayor of Charlotte, North Carolina (2017-2026)

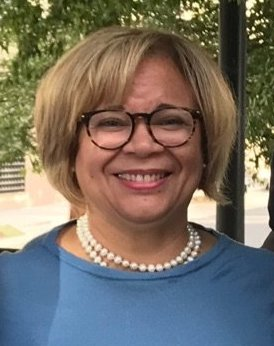
- Lyles in 2019

59th Mayor of Charlotte
- In office December 4, 2017 – July 1, 2026
- Preceded by: Jennifer Roberts
- Succeeded by: Rob Harrington

Mayor pro tempore of Charlotte
- In office December 7, 2015 – December 4, 2017
- Preceded by: Michael Barnes
- Succeeded by: Julie Eiselt

Personal details
- Born: Viola Alexander; September 28, 1952 (age 74) Columbia, South Carolina, U.S.
- Party: Democratic
- Spouse: John Lyles (m. 1996; died 2013)
- Children: 4
- Education: Queens University (BA); University of North Carolina, Chapel Hill (MPA)

Viola Alexander Lyles (born September 28, 1952) is an American politician who served as the 59th mayor of Charlotte, North Carolina from 2017 to 2026. A member of the Democratic Party, Lyles was a member of the Charlotte City Council before taking office as mayor.

== Education and personal life ==
Lyles was raised in Columbia, South Carolina. Her father owned a construction company and her mother worked as a teacher. She earned her bachelor's degree in political science from Queens University of Charlotte and a Master of Public Administration from University of North Carolina at Chapel Hill.

Lyles was married to Wayne Alexander, a North Carolina state attorney who ran his own private practice for 12 years until his death in 1987. She later married John Lyles, who died in 2013. She has two children from her first marriage, Kwame Alexander and Aisha Alexander-Young. Her daughter is known for her contributions to philanthropy, political commentary, and community organizing.

== Career ==
=== City council ===
Lyles worked for the city of Charlotte, North Carolina, as a budget analyst, budget director, and assistant city manager. Starting in 2004, she worked as a consulting director for the Lee Institute and then for Flynn Heath Holt Leadership. She was the community outreach director for the 2012 Democratic National Convention.

Lyles was elected to the Charlotte City Council in 2013, and was elected mayor pro-tem in 2015. Following the shooting of Keith Lamont Scott in September 2016, she proposed a seven-point plan to reduce racial and class divisions in the city, parts of which were approved by the council. In February 2016, Lyles supported an ordinance that prohibited discrimination against LGBTQ individuals in public accommodations.

=== Mayoral campaign and election results ===
Lyles ran for mayor of Charlotte in the 2017 election. She defeated Jennifer Roberts, the incumbent mayor, in the Democratic Party primary election in September 2017 by 15,805 votes (46.13%) to Roberts’ 12,412 votes (36.23%).

Lyles defeated Kenny Smith, a Republican city council member, in the 2017 Charlotte mayoral election, winning with 72,073 votes (59.15%) to Smith's 49,652 (40.75%). She is the first African-American female mayor of the city, and also its first former city administrator to serve as mayor.

In 2019, Lyles chose to run for a second term. After winning the Democratic primary as the mayoral incumbent, she was challenged by Republican David Michael Rice in the general election. Lyles won the election, holding 70,886 votes (77.3%) to Rice's 20,459 votes (22.3%).

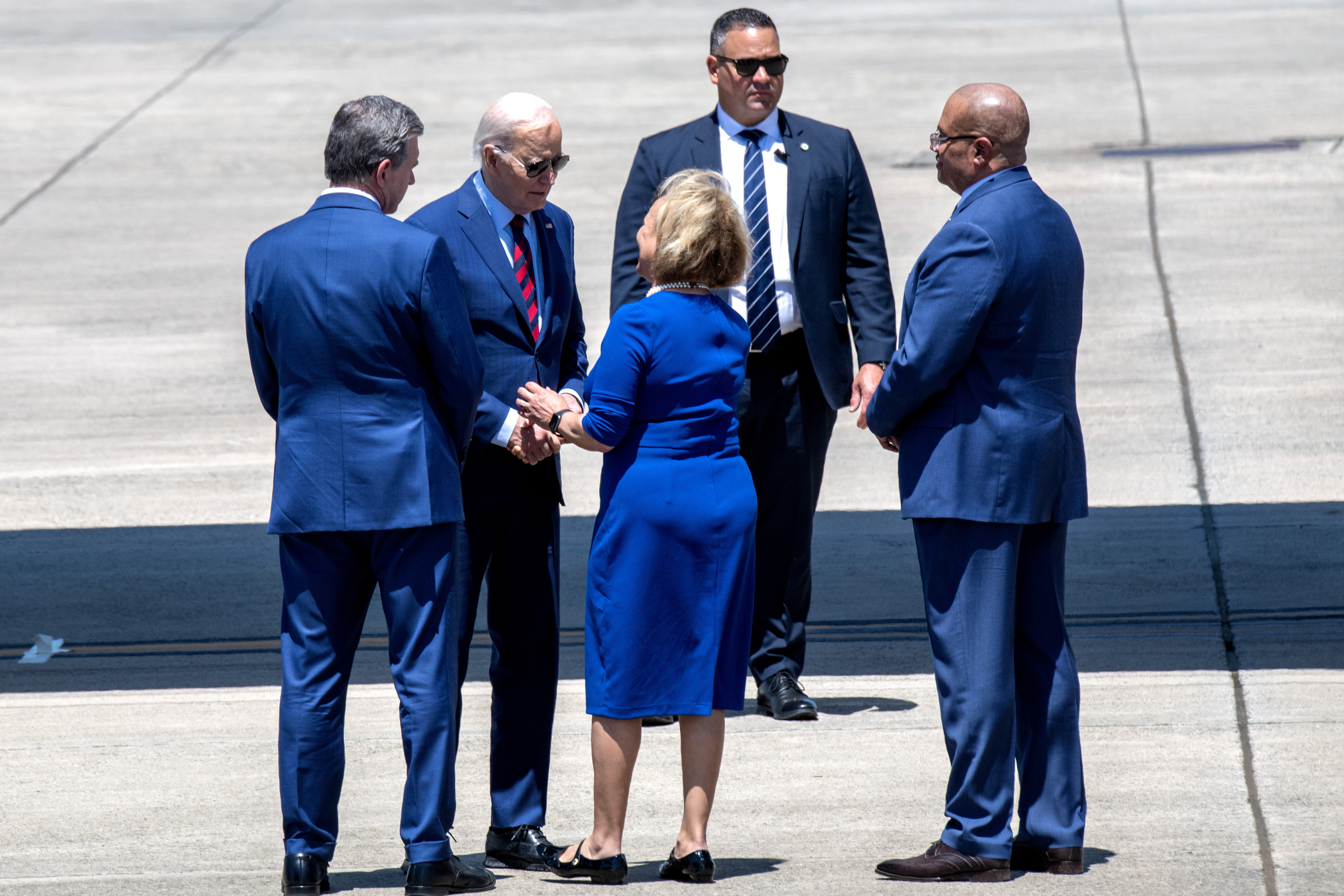
Lyles with U.S. President Joe Biden and North Carolina Governor Roy Cooper on May 2, 2024

After another Democratic primary election in 2022, Lyles was again chosen as the Democratic candidate for the 2022 Charlotte mayoral election. Her challenger was Republican Stephanie de Sarachaga-Bilbao. Lyles secured 49,324 votes (68.4%) and won election to her third mayoral term; de Sarachaga-Bilbao received 22,580 votes (31.3%).

=== Endorsements ===
During the 2017 Charlotte mayoral general election, Lyles received endorsements from both local and national groups, including Black Political Caucus, Charlotte Firefighters Association, Democracy for America, Human Rights Campaign, MeckPAC, Equality NC, and The Charlotte Observer.

=== Mayoral power ===
The City of Charlotte has a professional city manager who runs day-to-day operations. The mayor, along with four of the eleven council members, are elected by the entire city, while the other seven council members are elected by district.

== Policy ==
=== Budget ===
Governmental spending on policies is directly contributable to budget expenditures. The General Fund budget for the 2023 fiscal year in millions was: Police 40.5% ($317.6), Fire 19.7% ($154.8), Solid Waste Services 9.6% ($75.3), Innovation and Technology 6.2% ($48.8), Financial Partners/Other 5.4% ($42.7), Internal Services 5.1% ($39.8), Transportation 3.9% ($30.4), General Services 3.1% ($24.7), Housing and Neighborhood Services 2.8% ($21.6), Planning 1.6% ($12.8), Street Lighting 1.2% ($9.8), and Economic Development 0.8% ($6.6).

=== Economic expansion ===
Lyles entered office in 2015 with Charlotte's unemployment averaging 5.30%. She aided the creation of more than 27,000 new jobs by securing Charlotte as the location for expansion by Honeywell, Lowes, and Microsoft. This, combined with the development of homegrown businesses, such as LendingTree and Avid Exchange, led to an influx of employment opportunities. As more jobs became available in Charlotte, the unemployment rate average decreased: 4.85% (2016), 4.38% (2017), 3.88% (2018), 3.68% (2019), 7.76% (2020), 4.67% (2021), and 3.76% (2022 Jan-Aug). Before the COVID-19 pandemic, the unemployment average in 2020 was 3.77%, before jumping to 13.0% in April 2020.

=== Housing ===
In April 2018, Lyles sought the expansion of the Housing Trust Fund, which promotes the construction of public housing for low-income renters through subsidies.

=== Public safety ===
In 2021, Lyles and the city of Charlotte implemented a program called Alternatives to Violence in Charlotte to curb violent crimes and shootings. The program was first used in the Mecklenburg County area before expanding to the Beatties Ford and LaSalle county areas.

In September 2025, Lyles stated that the killing of Iryna Zarutska was caused in part by the failure of the justice system that allowed the perpetrator to re-enter society despite his mental illness and violent behavior. On September 9, 2025, she said, "We need a bipartisan solution to address repeat offenders who do not face consequences for their actions and those who cannot get treatment for their mental illness and are allowed to be on the streets."

=== Race equity ===
On November 1, 2021, Lyles launched the Racial Equity Initiative that would invest $250 million to "address inequities and remove barriers to opportunity through four priority focus areas." The project built a new Center for Digital Equity, invest in Charlotte's six corridors of opportunity neighborhoods, turn Johnson C. Smith University into a top HBCU, and ensure commitment from organizations to advance black leaders and leaders of color throughout their corporations.

=== Transportation ===
One of the areas of policy that Lyles focuses her efforts on is the expansion of Charlotte, one of the fastest-growing cities in the nation. To connect areas of the city, she, alongside the Charlotte Area Transit System, opened a 19-mile light rail transit line. The railway, which opened in her first term, was expected to reduce traffic accidents and increase urban mobility and accessibility. Lyles implemented a Vision Zero philosophy with the intention to further decrease traffic fatalities.

== See also ==
- List of mayors of the 50 largest cities in the United States

Political offices
Preceded by Jennifer Roberts	Mayor of Charlotte; 2017–2026	Succeeded by Rob Harrington
