= Mayor of Charlotte, North Carolina =

Political office in the United States

- Incumbent; Rob Harrington since July 1, 2026
- Type: Mayor
- Term length: 2 years
- Formation: 1853
- First holder: William F. Davidson

The office of the Mayor of Charlotte, North Carolina is currently held by Democrat Rob Harrington, who took office in July 2026 after the resignation of former Mayor Vi Lyles. Harrington will serve until the next election in 2027.

The office was established in 1853, when William F. Davidson was elected to serve as intendant. In 1861, the title was changed from intendant to mayor. Below is a list of people who have served as the mayor of Charlotte.

Charlotte mayors serve two-year terms and elections take place in off-years. The longest-serving mayor is Pat McCrory, who served from 1995 to 2009.

== List of mayors of Charlotte ==
Image	Mayor	Term	Political party	Notes
	William F. Davidson	1853–1857	-	
	David Parks	1857–1859	-	
	Jennings B. Kerr	1859–1861	-	
	William A. Owens	1861–1862	-	Resigned after one month in order to command a Confederate regiment. Was killed in battle in 1864.
	Robert F. Davidson	1862–1863	-	Originally Mayor Pro Tem, served the remainder of Owens' term.
	Samuel A. Harris	1864–1865	-	Appointed by Provisional Governor William Woods Holden.
	H.M. Pritchard	1865–1866	-	Appointed by Provisional Governor William Woods Holden.
	Samuel A. Harris	1866–1868	-	Second appointment.
	Frederick W. Ahrens	1867–1868	-	Appointed by Provisional Governor William Woods Holden.
	H.M. Pritchard	1868–1869	-	Second appointment.
	Clement Dowd	1869–1871	Democratic	Later became a U.S. Representative.
	John A. Young	1871–1873	-	
	William F. Davidson	1873–1875	-	
	William Johnston	1875–1878	-	
	Benjamin Rush Smith	1878–1879	-	
	Frank I. Osborne	1879–1880	Democratic	Later became a North Carolina State Senator and North Carolina Attorney General (1893–1897).
	Frederick S. DeWolfe	1880–1883	-	
	William C. Maxwell	1883–1884	-	
	William Johnston	1884–1887	-	
	F. Brevard McDowell	1887–1891	-	
	R.J. Brevard	1891–1895	-	
	E.B. Spring	1897–1899	-	
	Johnson D. McCall	1899–1901	Democratic	
	Peter Marshall Brown	1901–1905	Democratic	
	Samuel S. McNinch	1905–1907	Democratic	
	Thomas S. Franklin	1907–1909	Democratic	Secured funding for the first public library in Charlotte from the Carnegie Foundation.
	Thomas W. Hawkins	1909–1911	Democratic	
	Charles A. Bland	1911–1915	Democratic	
	Thomas Leroy Kirkpatrick	1915–1917	Democratic	
	Frank R. McNinch	1917–1920	Democratic	Later became chairman of the Federal Power Commission and chairman of the Federal Communications Commission.
	John M. Wilson	1920–1921	Democratic	Became Mayor when Frank McNinch stepped down to take a job in Washington, D.C. WBT went on the air.
	James O. Walker	1921–1924	Democratic	
	Harvey W. Moore	1924–1926	Democratic	
	David M. Abernathy	1926–1927	Democratic	Selected after Moore resigned to work in the private sector.
	F. Marion Redd	1927–1929	Democratic	
	George E. Wilson, Jr.	1929–1931	Democratic	
	Charles E. Lambeth	1931–1933	Democratic	
	Arthur E. Wearn	1933–1935	Democratic	
	Ben Elbert Douglas, Sr.	1935–1941	Democratic	Charlotte Douglas International Airport was completed under Douglas and carries his name.
	E. McA. Currie	1941–1943	Democratic	
	Herbert Hill Baxter	1943–1949	Democratic	Charlotte College, now the University of North Carolina at Charlotte, was established and fluoride was added to the water supply.
	Victor Shaw	1949–1953	Democratic	
	Philip Van Every	1953–1957	Democratic	During Van Every's administration the Charlotte Coliseum and Independence Blvd. were completed.
	James Saxon Smith	1957–1961	Democratic	
	Stanford R. Brookshire	1961–1969	Democratic	Lake Norman was developed during his administration. Brookshire Freeway and Brookshire Boulevard are named in his honor.
	John M. Belk	1969–1977	Democratic	The original Charlotte Convention Center was built and SouthPark Mall was developed. John Belk Freeway is named for him.
	Kenneth R. Harris	1977–1979	Republican	First Republican Mayor. Liquor by the drink approved by voters. Later became a North Carolina State Senator.
	Eddie Knox	1979–1983	Democratic	Discovery Place was built.
	Harvey Gantt	1983–1987	Democratic	First African-American Mayor. The Harvey B. Gantt Center is named in his honor.
	Sue Myrick	1987–1991	Republican	First female Mayor. Second Charlotte Coliseum completed. Later became a U.S. Representative.
	Richard Vinroot	1991–1995	Republican	Bank of America Corporate Center is dedicated.
	Pat McCrory	1995–2009	Republican	Longest-serving mayor with seven terms. First Charlotte mayor to be elected Governor of North Carolina.
	Anthony Foxx	2009–2013	Democratic	Stepped down to become United States Secretary of Transportation.
	Patsy Kinsey	2013	Democratic	Served the remainder of Foxx's term.
	Patrick Cannon	2013–2014	Democratic	Resigned after being arrested on corruption charges.
	Dan Clodfelter	2014–2015	Democratic	Appointed mayor by the City Council on 7 April 2014.
	Jennifer Roberts	2015–2017	Democratic	
	Vi Lyles	2017–2026	Democratic	First African-American female mayor; resigned.
	Rob Harrington	2026–	Democratic	Interim mayor.

== See also ==
- Timeline of Charlotte, North Carolina
