= Robert Gray =

Robert, Robbie, Bob or Bobby Gray may refer to:

== Sportspeople ==
- Robert Gray (discus thrower) (born 1956), Canadian Olympic athlete
- Robbie Gray (born 1988), Australian rules footballer
- Bob Gray (Australian footballer) (1943–2008), Australian rules footballer for Footscray
- Bob Gray (cross-country skier) (born 1939), American Olympic skier
- Bob Gray (ice hockey) (born 1940), Canadian ice hockey goaltender
- Bobby Gray (American football) (born 1978), former safety in the National Football League
- Bobby Gray (boxer), boxer from San Jose, California
- Rob Gray (basketball) (Robert Dejuan Gray Jr., born 1994), American basketball player

=== Association football ===
- Robert Gray (footballer, born 1927) (1927–2018), Scottish footballer
- Robert Gray (footballer, born 1951), Scottish footballer
- Robert Gray (footballer, born 1953), Scottish footballer
- Robert Gray (footballer, born 1970), English footballer
- Bob Gray (footballer, born 1872) (1872–1926), Scottish football player (Grimsby Town)
- Bob Gray (footballer, born 1923) (1923–2022), English football goalkeeper
- Bob Gray (soccer) (born 1952), former head men's soccer coach at Marshall University

== Politicians ==
- Robert Andrew Gray (1882–1975), American politician from Florida
- Robert Isaac Dey Gray (c. 1772–1804), Canadian politician
- Robert Gray (Mississippi politician) (born 1969), politician from the US state of Mississippi
- Robert Gray (North Carolina politician) (c. 1855–?), state legislator
- Robert Gray (Scottish politician) (c. 1895–1975), Scottish nationalist activist
- Bob Gray (Australian politician) (1898–1978), Australian politician in Victoria
- Bob Gray (South Dakota politician) (born 1971), American politician in the South Dakota Senate
- Robert Gray (MP) (died 1730), English politician in Wiltshire

== Other ==
- Robert Gray (accountancy academic) (1948–2020), British social and environmental accounting theorist
- Robert Gray (actor) (1945–2013), actor in Armed and Dangerous
- Robert Gray (bishop of Bristol) (1762–1834), father of the bishop of Cape Town
- Robert Gray (bishop of Cape Town) (1809–1872), first Anglican bishop of Cape Town
- Robert Gray (ornithologist) (1825–1887), Scottish ornithologist
- Robert Gray (poet) (1945–2025), Australian poet
- Robert Gray (sea captain) (1755–1806), American merchant sea-captain and explorer
- Robert A. Gray (1834–1906), Union Army soldier and Medal of Honor recipient
- Robert H. Gray (1948–2021), American data analyst, author, and astronomer
- Robert Hampton Gray (1917–1945), Canadian naval officer, pilot, and recipient of the Victoria Cross
  - HMCS Robert Hampton Gray, a Harry DeWolf-class offshore patrol vessel for the Royal Canadian Navy
- Robert Keith Gray (1921–2014), Republican activist and public relations executive
- Robert M. Gray (born 1943), American information theorist
- Robert Manning Gray (1919–1942), United States Army Air Forces pilot
- R. W. Gray, Canadian writer and film studies academic
- Robert Whytlaw-Gray (1877–1958), English chemist
- Bob Gray (priest) (born 1970), Irish Anglican priest
- Bob Gray, a name espoused by "Pennywise" from Stephen King's It

== See also ==
- R. Henry Grey (1891–1934), American silent film actor who was sometimes credited as Robert Gray
- Robert Grey (disambiguation)
- Rob Gray (disambiguation)
