= R.A. Gray =

R.A. Gray may refer to:

- R.A. Gray (architect), designer of St. Mary's Church (Phoenix, Arizona) (built 1902–1914)
- Robert Andrew Gray (1882–1975), Florida politician
- Robert A. Gray (1834–1906), Union Army soldier and Medal of Honor recipient

== See also ==
- Robert Gray (disambiguation)
