= Republicans buy sneakers, too =

1990 Michael Jordan quote

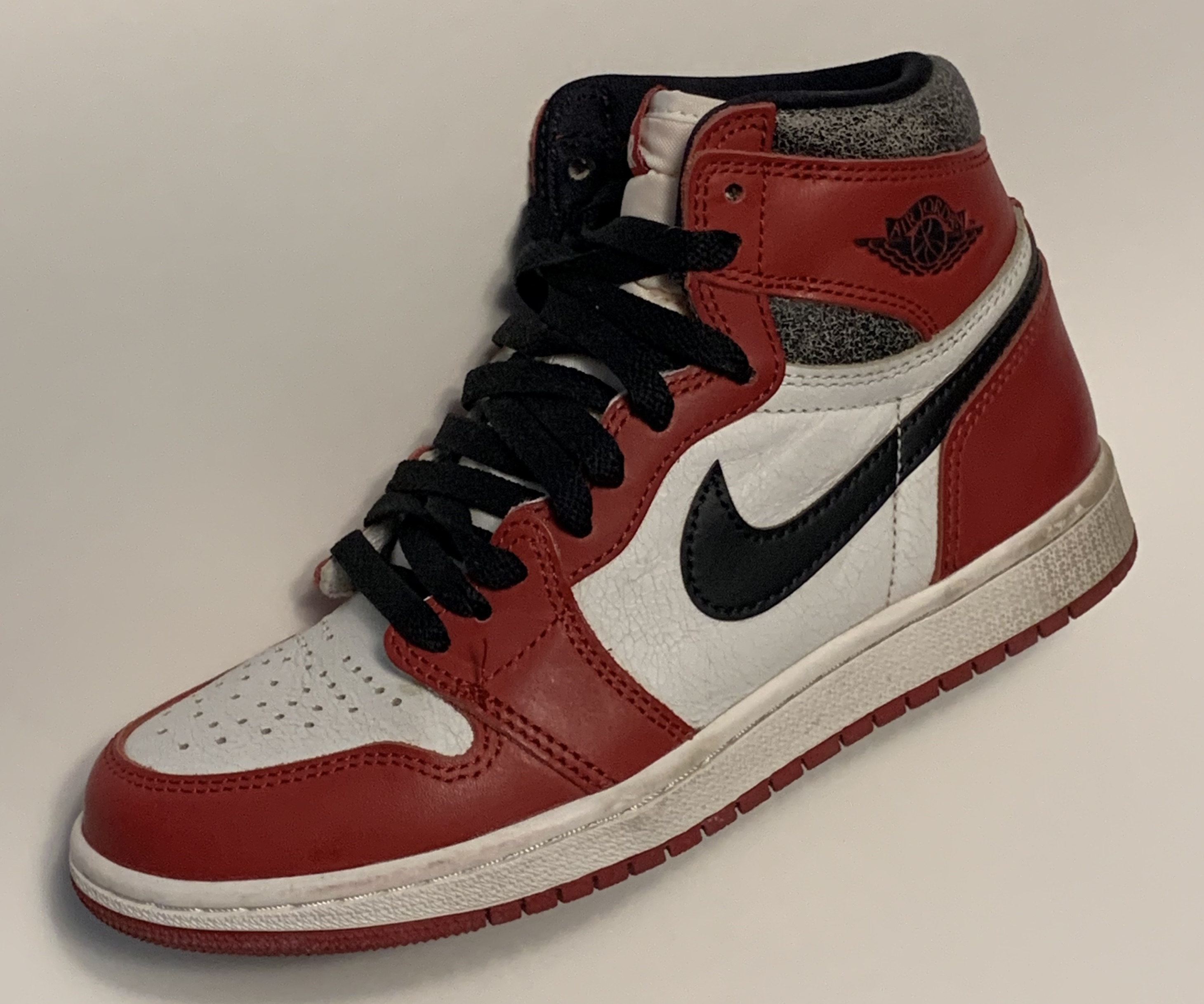
Nike Air Jordan I (1984)

"Republicans buy sneakers, too" (also commonly rendered as "Republicans buy shoes, too") is a quote by NBA superstar Michael Jordan, often cited as an explanation for his refusal to publicly endorse Democratic candidate Harvey Gantt in the 1990 United States Senate race against Jesse Helms in Jordan's home state of North Carolina. The remark has since become emblematic of Jordan's long-standing reluctance to engage in political or social activism during his playing career, a stance often attributed to his desire to maintain broad, bipartisan commercial appeal.

== History and context ==
NBA superstar Michael Jordan established his reputation for refraining from commenting on social issues when he chose not to endorse black North Carolina Democrat Harvey Gantt in his 1990 Senate race against incumbent Jesse Helms.

According to Slate, the quote first appears in Sam Smith's 1995 book Second Coming about Jordan's return from minor league baseball to the Chicago Bulls:

Another time, he was approached by U.S. Senate hopeful Harvey Gantt, a black politician who was running against Jesse Helms in North Carolina, Jordan's home state. Gantt had hoped that Jordan’s name would help him defeat Helms, widely regarded as a virulent racist. But Jordan declined. He wasn’t into politics, he explained, didn’t really know the issues. And, as he later told a friend, "Republicans buy shoes, too."

Smith offered a more detailed account in his 2014 book There Is No Next, implying that Smith had personally heard Jordan make the remark. Smith characterized the phrase as a joke rather than a statement of Jordan's personal political philosophy.

I'd probably gotten Jordan in some trouble as well when I’d used his joke when I was asking him why he wasn’t working for or endorsing Mayor Harvey Gantt in the Senate race against Jesse Helms, who had a history of racist behavior. Jordan with a sharp retort, which was his way of engaging in conversation, said "Republicans buy sneakers, too."

The quote was widely attributed to Jordan by numerous sources, such as David Halberstam in his 1999 book Playing for Keeps, The New York Times, Boston Globe, USA Today, and others.

== Historiography and legacy ==
Jordan's decision not to endorse Harvey Gantt drew criticism from several prominent black athletes and public figures. Tennis legend Arthur Ashe reportedly attempted to persuade Jordan to support Gantt's campaign. In 1991, former NFL star and activist Jim Brown criticized Jordan, stating that his "main concern is the demands of corporate America" and arguing that Jordan "is not being a role model [for Blacks] in the proper way." Years later, in a 2015 interview, basketball Hall of Famer Kareem Abdul-Jabbar also expressed disappointment in Jordan's reluctance to engage politically. "He took commerce over conscience," Abdul-Jabbar said. "It's unfortunate for him, but he's gotta live with it."

In a 2015 interview, Smith stated that Jordan had been judged unfairly over the quote and criticized the media for taking Jordan's original remark out of context. When asked to clarify the context of the quote and whether he had personally heard Jordan say it, Smith declined to elaborate, saying, "It was 30 years ago. I’m not getting into a discussion about that." In 2020, Smith provided further clarification, stating that Jordan's remark was not intended as a neutral or commercially calculated statement. Rather, Smith described it as "a show of defiance" against the NBA’s unspoken expectation that its star players avoid political controversy.

In The Last Dance, a 2020 documentary series about his career, Jordan addressed the long-debated quote directly, confirming that he had made the statement but that it had been made in jest:

I said it in jest on a bus with Horace Grant and Scottie Pippen. It was thrown off the cuff. My mother asked to do a PSA for Harvey Gantt, and I said, 'Look, Mom, I'm not speaking out of pocket about someone that I don't know. But I will send a contribution to support him.' Which is what I did.

Jordan’s public stance on social issues evolved over time. In 2015, amid rising tensions over police violence and the killings of police officers, he released a rare public statement calling for racial unity in the United States. He also announced a $2 million donation: $1 million each to the Institute for Community-Police Relations and the NAACP Legal Defense Fund.

In 2018, conservative sports commentator Clay Travis used the quote as the title of his book, Republicans Buy Sneakers Too: How the Left Is Ruining Sports, which argued against what he saw as an increasing politicization of sports by liberal voices.
