= Robert Grey =

Robert Grey may refer to:

- Robert Grey (musician) (born 1951), drummer for Wire
- Robert D. Grey, American academic administrator
- R. Henry Grey (1891–1934), American silent film actor
- Robert J. Grey Jr., American lawyer
- Robert T. Grey, American diplomat

== See also ==
- Robert Grey Bushong (1883–1951), U.S. Representative from Pennsylvania
- Robert Gray (disambiguation)
