= Archdeacon of Cashel, Waterford and Lismore =

Province of Dublin
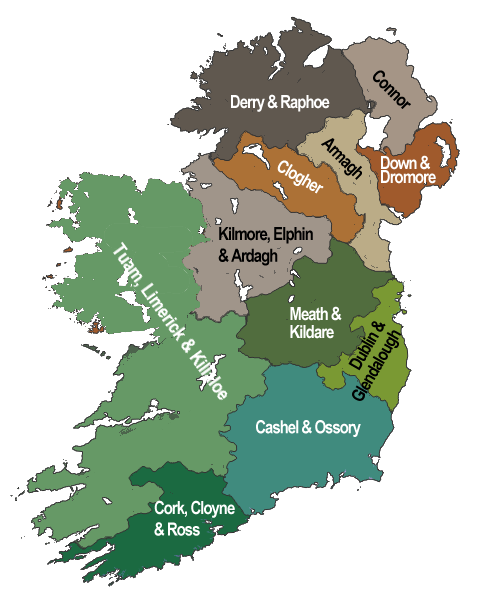
- Church: Church of Ireland
- Metropolitan bishop: Archbishop of Dublin
- Cathedral: Christ Church Cathedral, Dublin
- Dioceses: 5

The Archdeacon of Cashel, Waterford and Lismore is a senior ecclesiastical officer within the Anglican Diocese of Cashel and Ossory. The current incumbent is Bob Gray. As such he is responsible for the disciplinary supervision of the clergy within the parts of the diocese covered formerly by the Archdeacons of Cashel, Waterford and Lismore.
