= 1996 United States Senate election in North Carolina =

- November 5, 1996
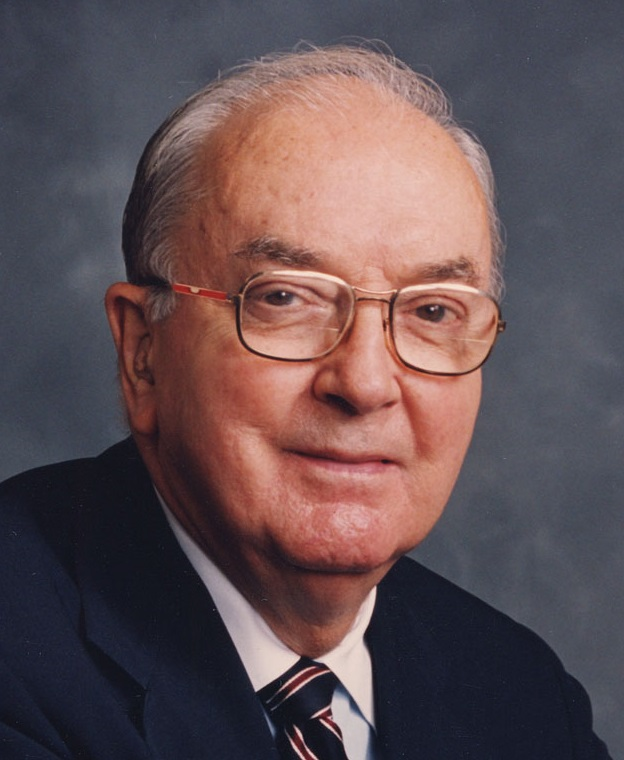

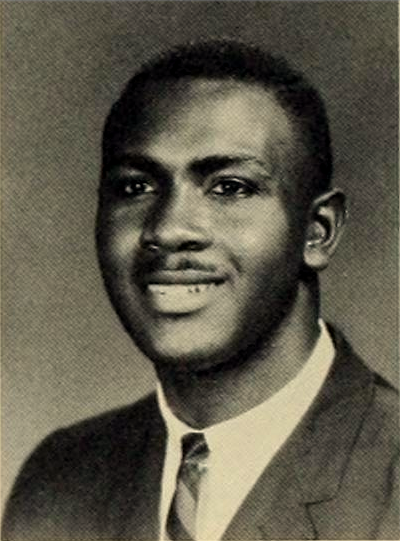
| Nominee | Jesse Helms | Harvey Gantt |
| Party | Republican | Democratic |
| Popular vote | 1,345,833 | 1,173,875 |
| Percentage | 52.64% | 45.92% |
- County results Helms: 40–50% 50–60% 60–70% 70–80% Gantt: 40–50% 50–60% 60–70%
U.S. senator before election
Jesse Helms
Republican
Elected U.S. Senator
Jesse Helms
Republican

The North Carolina United States Senate election of 1996 was held on November 5, 1996 as part of the nationwide elections to the Senate, and coincided with the 1996 presidential election.

The general election was a rematch of the 1990 election between Republican incumbent Jesse Helms and Democratic nominee Harvey Gantt, the former Mayor of Charlotte. Helms won re-election to a fifth and final term by a slightly wider margin than in 1990. Helms would ultimately tie with Furnifold Simmons as North Carolina's longest-serving U.S senator, with a record of 30 years.

== Democratic primary ==
In the Democratic primary, Gantt defeated Charles Sanders, who was CEO of pharmaceutical company Glaxo. As a candidate, Gantt supported a balanced federal budget, a $10,000 tax deduction for the middle-class, while also pledging to defend Medicare and education funding.

1996 North Carolina U.S. Senate Democratic primary election
| Party | Candidate | Votes | % | ±% |
|---|---|---|---|---|
| Democratic | Harvey Gantt | 308,337 | 52.40% | +14.88% |
| Democratic | Charles Sanders | 245,297 | 41.68% | N/A |
| Democratic | Ralph McKinney | 34,829 | 5.92% | N/A |
| Turnout | | 588,463 | | |

== Republican primary ==
Jesse Helms won the Republican Party's nomination unopposed.

== General election ==
During the campaign, Helms refused to debate Gantt or appear in public with him, instead choosing to focus his campaign's energy on television advertisements. Helms' campaign ads accused Gantt of being too socially liberal on issues such as gay rights and the death penalty. A major issue in the campaign were proposals for tobacco regulation: Helms accused Gantt of supporting President Bill Clinton's efforts to regulate tobacco use, while Gantt broke with his party to criticize Clinton on the subject.

In return, Gantt accused Helms of being out-of-touch on "kitchen table issues" affecting working-class families, and stated that Helms "appeals to the bigotry and the prejudice that may be within all of us", though stopped short of calling Helms a racist.

=== Results ===
Following this election, every senator from the Class II senate seat only served one term until Thom Tillis won re-election in 2020.

1996 North Carolina U.S. Senate election
| Party | Candidate | Votes | % | ±% |
|---|---|---|---|---|
| Republican | Jesse Helms (Incumbent) | 1,345,833 | 52.64% | +0.08% |
| Democratic | Harvey Gantt | 1,173,875 | 45.92% | −1.49% |
| Libertarian | Ray Ubinger | 25,396 | 0.99% | N/A |
| Natural Law | Victor Pardo | 11,209 | 0.44% | N/A |
| Turnout | | 2,556,456 | | |
| Republican hold | | | | |

== See also ==
- 1996 United States Senate elections
