= Jesse Helms =

American politician (1921–2008)

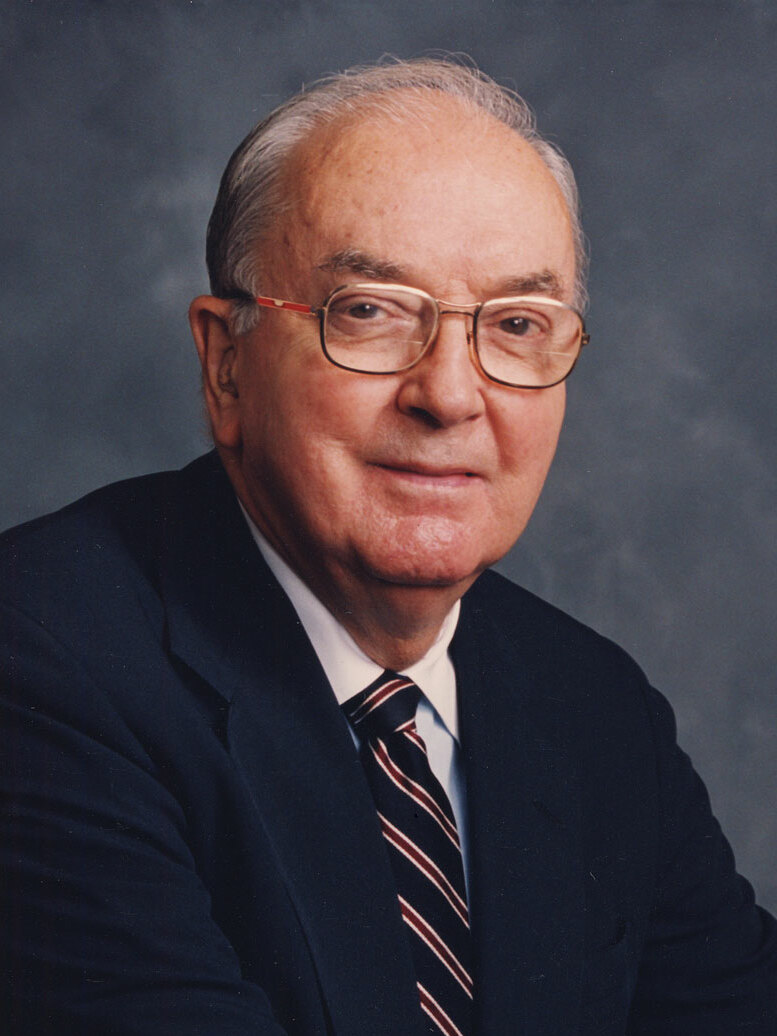

Chair of the Senate Foreign Relations Committee
- In office January 20, 2001 – June 6, 2001
- Preceded by: Joe Biden
- Succeeded by: Joe Biden
- In office January 3, 1995 – January 3, 2001
- Preceded by: Claiborne Pell
- Succeeded by: Joe Biden

Chair of the Senate Agriculture Committee
- In office January 3, 1981 – January 3, 1987
- Preceded by: Herman Talmadge
- Succeeded by: Patrick Leahy

United States Senator from North Carolina
- In office January 3, 1973 – January 3, 2003
- Preceded by: B. Everett Jordan
- Succeeded by: Elizabeth Dole

Personal details
- Born: Jesse Alexander Helms Jr. October 18, 1921 Monroe, North Carolina, U.S.
- Died: July 4, 2008 (aged 86) Raleigh, North Carolina, U.S.
- Resting place: Historic Oakwood Cemetery
- Party: Democratic (before 1970); Republican (1970–2008)
- Spouse: Dot Coble (m. 1942)
- Children: 3
- Education: Wingate University; Wake Forest University

Military service
- Branch/service: United States Navy
- Years of service: 1942–1945
- Battles/wars: World War II
- Helms's voice Helms addresses potential issues facing Secretary of State nominee James Baker. Recorded January 25, 1989

Jesse Alexander Helms Jr. (October 18, 1921 – July 4, 2008) was an American politician. A leader in the conservative movement, he served as a senator from North Carolina from 1973 to 2003. As chairman of the Senate Foreign Relations Committee from 1995 to 2001, he had a major voice in foreign policy. Helms helped organize and fund the conservative resurgence in the 1970s, focusing on Ronald Reagan's quest for the White House as well as helping many local and regional candidates.

On domestic social issues, Helms opposed civil rights, disability rights, environmentalism, feminism, gay rights, affirmative action, access to abortions, the Religious Freedom Restoration Act, and the National Endowment for the Arts. He brought an "aggressiveness" to his conservatism and nationalism, as in his rhetoric against abortion and homosexuality. The Almanac of American Politics wrote that "no American politician is more controversial, beloved in some quarters and hated in others, than Jesse Helms".

As chairman of the powerful Senate Foreign Relations Committee, he demanded an anti-communist foreign policy. His relations with the State Department were often acrimonious, and he blocked numerous presidential appointees.

Helms was the longest-serving popularly elected senator in North Carolina's history. He was widely credited with shifting the one-party state into a competitive two-party state. He advocated the movement of conservatives from the Democratic Party – which he deemed too liberal – to the Republican Party. The Helms-controlled National Congressional Club's state-of-the-art direct mail operation raised millions of dollars for Helms and other conservative candidates, allowing Helms to outspend his opponents in most of his campaigns. Helms was considered the most stridently conservative American politician of the post-1960s era, especially in opposition to federal intervention into what he considered state affairs (including legislating integration via the Civil Rights Act of 1964 and enforcing suffrage through the Voting Rights Act of 1965).

== Early life and education (1921–1940) ==
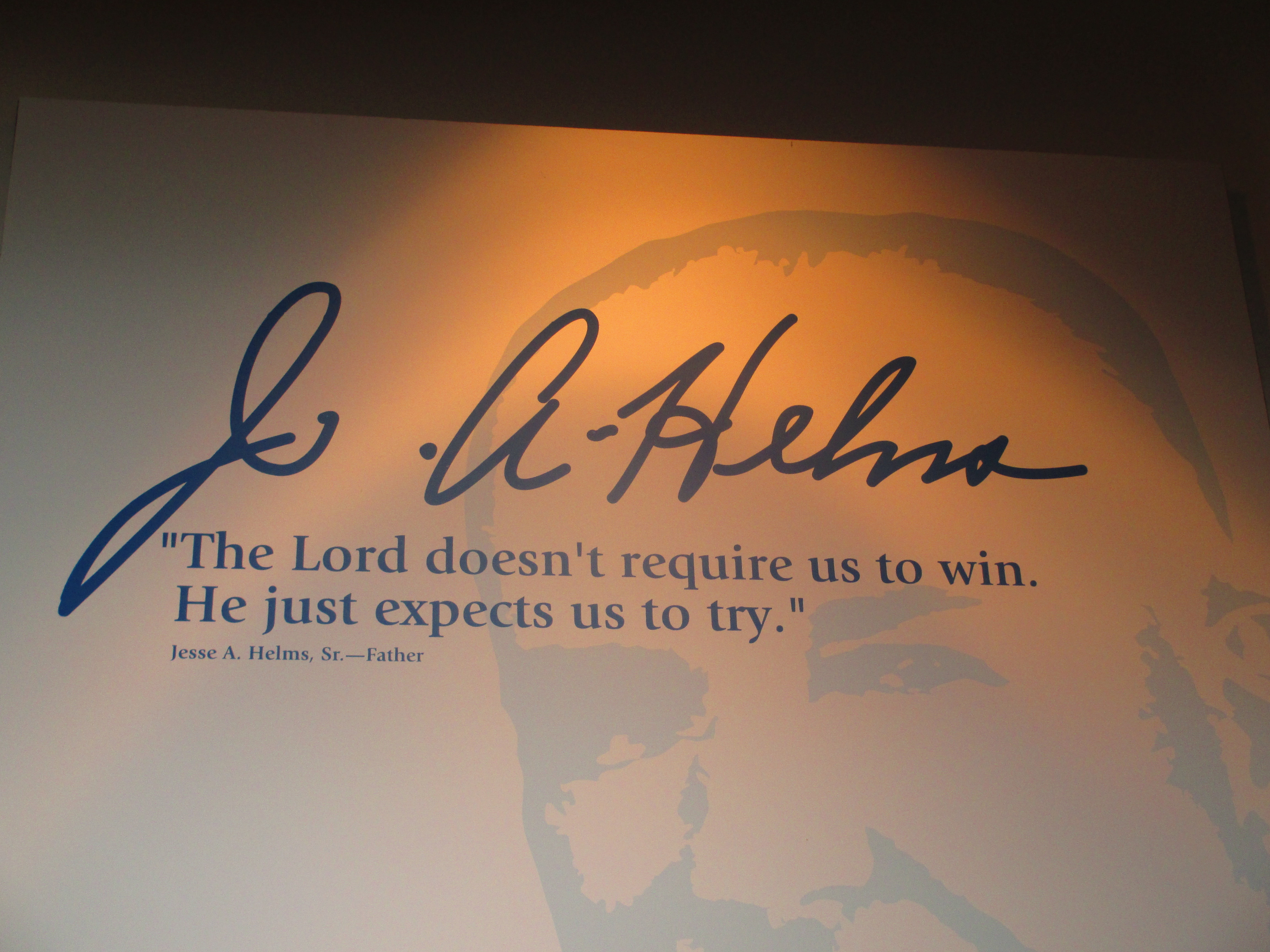
Advice from Jesse A. Helms Sr., to his son; Jesse Helms Center in Wingate, North Carolina

Helms was born in 1921 in Monroe, North Carolina, where his father, nicknamed "Big Jesse", served as both fire chief and chief of police; his mother, Ethel Mae Helms, was a homemaker. Helms described Monroe as a community surrounded by farmland and with a population of about three thousand where "you knew just about everybody and just about everybody knew you." The Helms family was poor during the Great Depression, resulting in each of the children working from an early age. Helms acquired his first job sweeping floors at The Monroe Enquirer at age nine. The family attended services each Sunday at First Baptist, Helms later saying he would never forget being served chickens raised in the family's backyard by his mother, following their weekly services. He recalled initially being bothered by their chickens becoming their food, but abandoned this view to allow himself to concentrate on his mother's cooking. Helms recalled that his family rarely spoke about politics, reasoning that the political climate did not call for discussions as most of the people the family were acquainted with were members of the Democratic Party.

Link described Helms's father as having a domineering influence on the child's development, describing the pair as being similar in having the traits of being extrovert, effusive, and enjoying the company of others while both favored constancy, loyalty, and respect for order. The elder Helms asserted to his son that ambition was good, and accomplishments and achievements would come his way through following a strict work ethic. Years later, Helms retained fond memories of his father's involvement with his youth: "I shall forever have wonderful memories of a caring, loving father who took the time to listen and to explain things to his wide-eyed son." In high school, Helms was voted "Most Obnoxious" in his senior yearbook. In his autobiography, civil rights activist Robert F. Williams recalled Helms's father as "a giant of a man and a hard-core racist", vividly recalling witnessing an incident around 1936 where Helms Sr. brutalized an African-American woman in Monroe.

Helms briefly attended Wingate Junior College, now Wingate University, near Monroe, before leaving for Wake Forest College. He left Wingate after a year to begin a career as a journalist, working for the next eleven years as a newspaper and radio reporter, first as a sportswriter and news reporter for Raleigh's The News & Observer, and also as assistant city editor for The Raleigh Times. Helms retained a positive view of Wingate into his later years, saying the school was filled with individuals that treated him with kindness and that he had made it an objective to repay the institution for what it had done for him. While attending Wake Forest, Helms left work early and ran a few blocks to catch a train every morning to ensure he was on time to his classes. Helms stated that his goal in attending was never to get a diploma but instead form the skills needed for forms of employment he was seeking at a time when he aspired to become a journalist.

== Marriage and family ==
Helms met Dorothy "Dot" Coble, editor of the society page at The News & Observer, and they married in 1942. Helms's first interest in politics came from conversations with his conservative father-in-law. In 1945, his and Dot's first child Jane was born.

== Early career (1940–1972) ==
Helms's first full-time job after college was as a sports reporter with the Raleigh Times. During World War II, Helms served stateside as a recruiter in the United States Navy.

After the war, he pursued his twin interests of journalism and Democratic Party politics. Helms became the city news editor of the Raleigh Times. He later became a radio and television newscaster and commentator for WRAL-TV, where he hired Armistead Maupin as a reporter.

=== Entry into politics ===
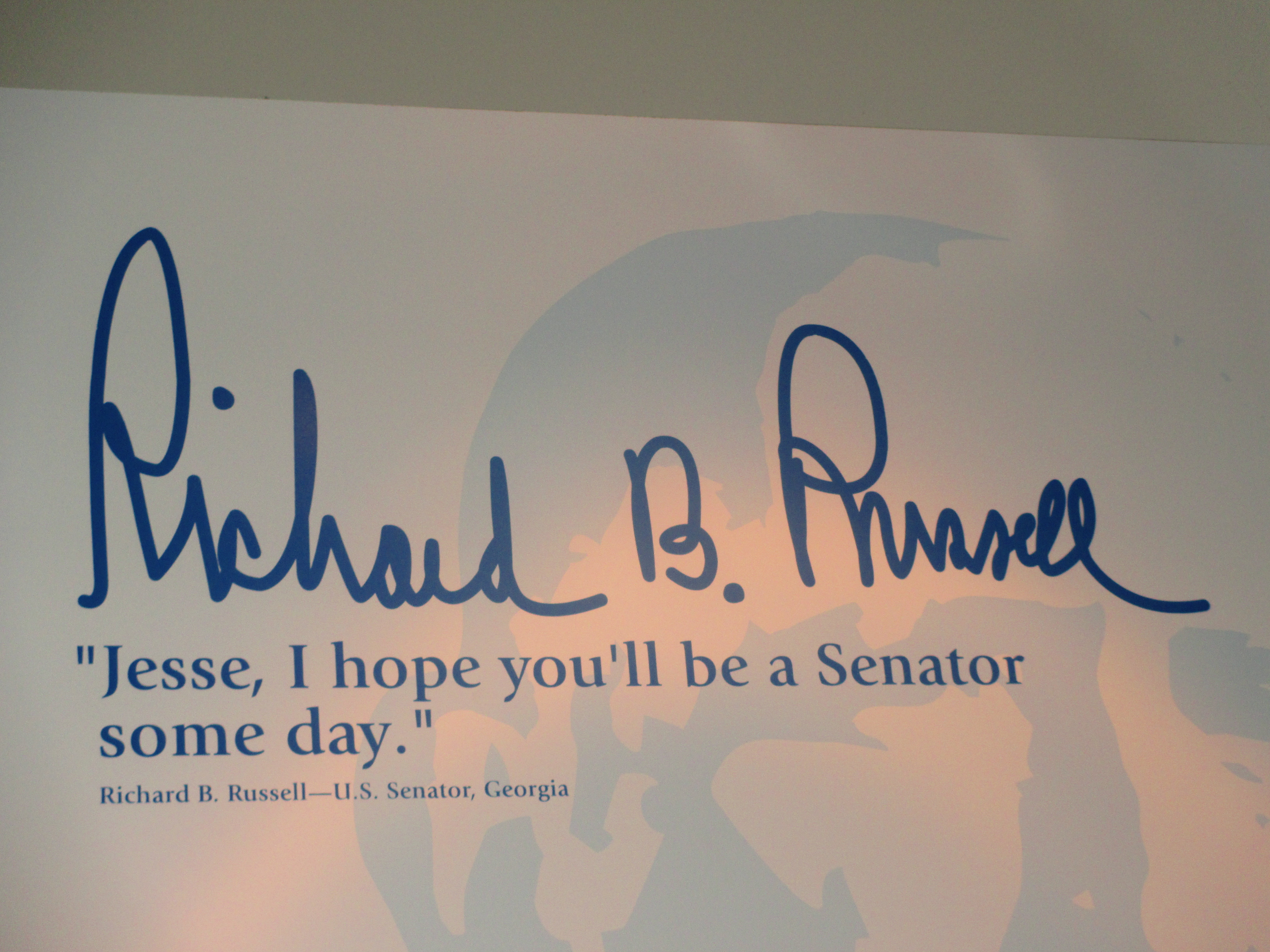
U.S. Senator Richard Russell Jr. of Georgia told Helms in 1952 that he hoped Helms would one day become a senator; Helms achieved this 20 years later, but Russell did not live to see it.

In 1950, Helms played a critical role as campaign publicity director for Willis Smith in the U.S. Senate campaign against a prominent liberal, Frank Porter Graham. Smith (a conservative Democratic lawyer and former president of the American Bar Association) portrayed Graham, who supported school desegregation, as a "dupe of communists" and a proponent of the "mingling of the races". Smith's fliers said, "Wake Up, White People", in the campaign for the virtually all-white primaries. Blacks were still mostly disfranchised in the state, because its 1900 constitutional amendment had been passed by white Democrats with restrictive voter registration and electoral provisions that effectively and severely reduced their role in electoral politics.

Smith won and hired Helms as his administrative assistant in Washington. In 1952, Helms worked on the presidential campaign of Georgia Senator Richard Russell Jr. After Russell dropped out of the presidential race, Helms returned to working for Smith. When Smith died in 1953, Helms returned to Raleigh.

From 1953 to 1960, Helms was executive director of the North Carolina Bankers Association. He and his wife set up their home on Caswell Street in the Hayes Barton Historic District, where he lived the rest of his life.

In 1957, Helms as a Democrat won his first election for a Raleigh City Council seat. He served two terms and earned a reputation as a conservative gadfly who "fought against everything from putting a median strip on Downtown Boulevard to an urban renewal project". Helms disliked his tenure on the council, feeling all the other members acted as a private club and that Mayor William G. Enloe was a "steamroller". In 1960, Helms worked on the unsuccessful primary gubernatorial campaign of I. Beverly Lake Sr., who ran on a platform of racial segregation. Lake lost to future Senator Terry Sanford, who ran as a racial moderate willing to implement the federal policy of school integration. Helms felt forced busing and forced racial integration caused animosity on both sides and "proved to be unwise".

=== Capitol Broadcasting Company ===
In 1960, Helms joined the Raleigh-based Capitol Broadcasting Company (CBC) as the executive vice-president, vice chairman of the board, and assistant chief executive officer. His daily CBC editorials on WRAL-TV, given at the end of each night's local news broadcast in Raleigh, made Helms famous as a conservative commentator throughout eastern North Carolina.

Helms's editorials featured folksy anecdotes interwoven with conservative views against "the civil rights movement, the liberal news media, and anti-war churches", among many targets. He referred to The News and Observer, his former employer, as the "Nuisance and Disturber" for its promotion of liberal views and support for African-American civil rights activities. The University of North Carolina at Chapel Hill, which had a reputation for liberalism, was also a frequent target of Helms's criticism. He is said to have referred to the university as "The University of Negroes and Communists" despite a lack of evidence, and suggested a wall be erected around the campus to prevent the university's liberal views from "infecting" the rest of the state. Helms said the civil rights movement was infested by Communists and "moral degenerates". He described the federal program of Medicaid as a "step over into the swampy field of socialized medicine".

Commenting on the 1963 protests and March on Washington during the Civil Rights Movement, Helms stated, "The Negro cannot count forever on the kind of restraint that's thus far left him free to clog the streets, disrupt traffic, and interfere with other men's rights." He later wrote, "Crime rates and irresponsibility among Negroes are facts of life which must be faced."

He was at Capitol Broadcasting Company until he filed for the Senate race in 1972.

=== Senate campaign of 1972 ===
In 1970, Helms, who had long been a registered Democrat but had never actually voted for a Democratic presidential candidate, officially switched his registration from the Democratic to Republican Party. After his party switch, conservative voters in both the Democratic and Republican parties began to urge him to run for US Senate.

Helms announced his candidacy for a seat in the United States Senate in 1972. His Republican primary campaign was managed by Thomas F. Ellis, who would later be instrumental in Ronald Reagan's 1976 campaign and also become the chair of the National Congressional Club. Helms took the Republican primary, winning 92,496 votes, or 60.1%, in a three-candidate field. Meanwhile, Democrats retired the ailing Senator B. Everett Jordan, who lost his primary to Congressman Nick Galifianakis. The latter represented the "new politics" of voters who included the young, African Americans voting since federal legislation removed discriminatory restrictions, and anti-establishment activists, who were based in and around the urban Research Triangle and Piedmont Triad. Although Galifianakis was a "liberal" by North Carolina standards, he opposed busing to achieve integration in schools.

Polls put Galifianakis well ahead until late in the campaign, but Helms, facing all but certain defeat, hired a professional campaign manager, F. Clifton White, giving him dictatorial control over campaign strategy. While Galifianakis avoided mention of his party's presidential candidate, the liberal George McGovern, Helms employed the slogans "McGovernGalifianakis – one and the same", "Vote for Jesse. Nixon Needs Him" and "Jesse: He's One of Us", an implicit play suggesting his opponent's Greek heritage made him somehow less "American". Helms won the support of numerous Democrats, especially in the conservative eastern part of the state. Galifianakis tried to woo Republicans by noting that Helms had earlier criticized Nixon as being too left-wing.

In a taste of things to come, money poured into the race. Helms spent a record $654,000, much of it going toward carefully crafted television commercials portraying him as a soft-spoken mainstream conservative. In the final six weeks of the campaign, Helms outspent Galifianakis three-to-one. Though the year was marked by Democratic gains in the Senate, Helms won 54 percent of the vote to Galifianakis's 46 percent. He was elected as the first Republican senator from the state since 1903, before senators were directly elected, and when the Republican Party stood for a different tradition. Helms was helped by Richard Nixon's gigantic landslide victory in that year's presidential election; Nixon carried North Carolina by 40 points.

== First Senate term (1973–1979) ==
=== Entering the Senate ===
In a world where give-and-take is the key to success, Helms refused to play the game of compromise. Rather than get together with opponents to work out their differences, Helms preferred to stand his ground in defeat.

— Journalist Rob Christensen, The News & Observer (2008)

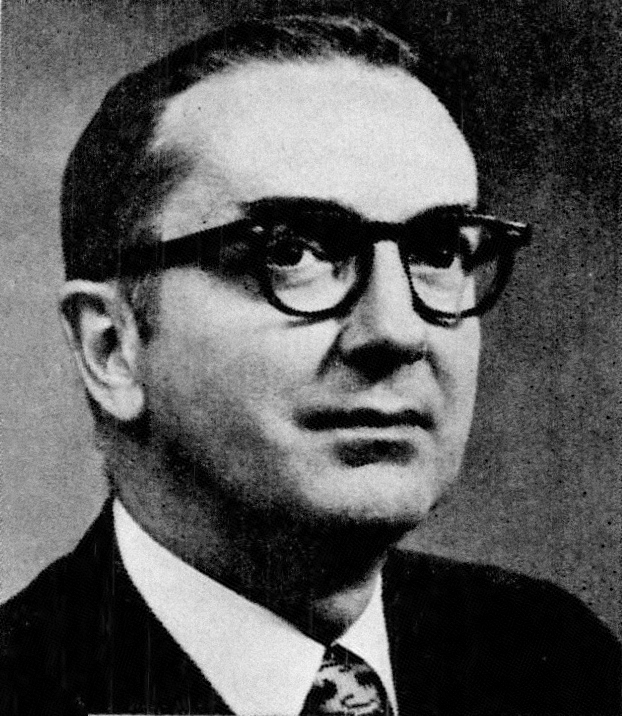
Helms c. 1973

Helms quickly became a "star" of the conservative movement, and was particularly vociferous on the issue of abortion. In 1974, in the wake of the US Supreme Court's decision in Roe v. Wade, Helms introduced a constitutional amendment that would have prohibited abortion in all circumstances, by conferring due process rights upon every fetus. However, the Senate hearing into the proposed amendments heard that neither Helms', nor James L. Buckley's similar amendment, would achieve their stated goal, and shelved them for the session. Both Helms and Buckley proposed amendments again in 1975, with Helms's amendment allowing states leeway in their implementation of an enshrined constitutional "right to life" from the "moment of fertilization".

Helms was also a prominent advocate of free enterprise and favored cutting the budget. He was a strong advocate of a global return to the gold standard, which he would push at numerous points throughout his Senate career; in October 1977, Helms proposed a successful amendment that allowed United States citizens to sign contracts linked to gold, overturning a 44-year ban on gold-indexed contracts, reflecting fears of inflation. Helms supported the tobacco industry, which contributed more than 6% of the state's GSP until the 1990s (the highest in the country); he argued that federal price support programs should be maintained, as they did not constitute a subsidy but insurance. Helms offered an amendment that would have denied food stamps to strikers when the Senate approved increasing federal contributions to food stamp and school lunch programs in May 1974.

In 1973, the United States Congress passed the Helms Amendment to the Foreign Assistance Act. It states that, "no foreign assistance funds may be used to pay for the performance of abortion as a method of family planning or to motivate or coerce any person to practice abortions."

In January 1973, along with Democrats James Abourezk and Floyd Haskell, Helms was one of three senators to vote against the confirmation of Peter J. Brennan as Secretary of Labor.

In May 1974, when the Senate approved the establishment of no‐fault automobile insurance plans in every state, it rejected an amendment by Helms exempting states that were opposed to no‐fault insurance.

=== Foreign policy ===
From the start, Helms identified as a prominent anti-communist. He proposed an act in 1974 that authorized the president to grant honorary citizenship to Soviet dissident Aleksandr Solzhenitsyn. He remained close to Solzhenitsyn's cause, and linked his fight to that of freedom throughout the world. In 1975, as North Vietnamese forces approached Saigon, Helms was foremost among those urging the US to evacuate all Vietnamese demanding this, which he believed could be "two million or more within seven days". When the Senate Armed Services Committee voted to suppress a report critical of the US's strategic position in the arms race, Helms read the entire report out, requiring it to be published in full in the Congressional Record.

Helms was not a strong supporter of Israel; for instance, in 1973 he proposed a resolution demanding Israel return the West Bank to Jordan, and, in 1975, demanding that the Palestinian Arabs receive a "just settlement of their grievances". In 1977, Helms was the sole senator to vote against prohibiting American companies from joining the Arab League boycott of Israel, but that was primarily because the bill also relaxed discrimination against Communist countries. In 1982, Helms called for the US to break diplomatic relations with Israel during the 1982 Lebanon War. He favored prohibiting foreign aid to countries that had recently detonated nuclear weapons: this was aimed squarely at India, but it also affected Israel should it conduct a nuclear test. He worked to support the supply of arms to the United States' Arab allies under presidents Carter and Reagan.

Helms and Bob Dole offered an amendment in 1973 that would have delayed cutting off funding for bombing in Cambodia if the President informed Congress that North Vietnam was not making an accounting "to the best of its ability" of US servicemen missing in Southeast Asia. The amendment was defeated by a vote of 56 to 25.

=== Nixon resignation ===
Helms delivered a Senate speech blaming liberal media for distorting Watergate and questioned if President Nixon had a constitutional right to be considered innocent until proven guilty following the April 1973 revelation of details relating to the scandal and Nixon administration aides resigning. He advocated against illegal activities being condoned with concurrent "half-truth and allegations" being reported by the media. Helms had four separate meetings with President Nixon in April and May 1973 where he attempted to cheer up the president and called for the White House to challenge its critics even as fellow Republicans from North Carolina criticized Nixon. Helms opposed the creation of the Senate Select Committee to Investigate Campaign Practices in the summer of 1973, even as it was chaired by fellow North Carolina Senator Sam Ervin, arguing that it was a ploy by Democrats to discredit and oust Nixon.

In August 1974, Newsweek published a list by the White House including Helms as one of 36 senators that the administration believed would support President Nixon in the event of his impeachment and being brought to trial by the Senate. The article stated that some supporters were not fully convinced and this would further peril the administration as 34 were needed to prevent conviction. Nixon resigned days later and kept contact with Helms during his post-presidency, calling Helms to either chat or offer advice.

=== 1976 presidential election ===
Helms supported Ronald Reagan for the presidential nomination in 1976, even before Reagan had announced his candidacy. His contribution was crucial in the North Carolina primary victory that paved the way for Reagan's presidential election in 1980. The support of Helms, alongside Raleigh-based campaign operative Thomas F. Ellis, was instrumental in Reagan's winning the North Carolina primary and later presenting a major challenge to incumbent President Gerald Ford at the 1976 Republican National Convention. According to author Craig Shirley, the two men deserve credit "for breathing life into the dying Reagan campaign". Going into the primary, Reagan had lost all the primaries, including in New Hampshire, where he had been favored, and was two million dollars in debt, with a growing number of Republican leaders calling for his exit. The Ford campaign was predicting a victory in North Carolina, but assessed Reagan's strength in the state simply: Helms's support. While Ford had the backing of Governor James Holshouser, the grassroots movement formed in North Carolina by Ellis and backed by Helms delivered an upset victory by 53% to 47%. The momentum generated in North Carolina carried Ronald Reagan to landslide primary wins in Texas, California, and other critical states, evening the contest between Reagan and Ford, and forcing undeclared delegates to choose at the 1976 convention.

Later, Helms was not pleased by the announcement that Reagan, if nominated, would ask the 1976 Republican National Convention to make moderate Pennsylvania Senator Richard Schweiker his running mate for the general election, but kept his objections to himself at the time. According to Helms, after Reagan told him of the decision, Helms noted the hour because, "I wanted to record for posterity the exact time I received the shock of my life." Helms and Strom Thurmond tried to make Reagan drop Schweiker for a conservative, perhaps either James Buckley or his brother William F. Buckley Jr., and rumors surfaced that Helms might run for vice president himself, but Schweiker was kept. In the end, Reagan lost narrowly to Ford at the convention, while Helms received only token support for the vice presidential nomination, albeit enough to place him second, far behind Ford's choice of Bob Dole. The Convention adopted a broadly conservative platform, and the conservative faction came out acting like the winners, except Jesse Helms.

Helms vowed to campaign actively for Ford across the South, regarding the conservative platform adopted at the convention to be a "mandate" on which Ford was pledging to run. However, he targeted Henry Kissinger after the latter issued a statement calling Aleksandr Solzhenitsyn a "threat to world peace", and Helms demanded that Kissinger embrace the platform or resign immediately. Helms continued to back Reagan, and the two remained close friends and political allies throughout Reagan's political career, although sometimes critical of each other. Despite Reagan's defeat at the convention, the intervention of Helms and Ellis arguably led to the most important conservative primary victory in the history of the Republican Party. This victory enabled Reagan to contest the 1976 Republican presidential nomination, and to win the next nomination at the 1980 Republican National Convention and ultimately the presidency of the United States.

According to Craig Shirley,

Had Reagan lost North Carolina, despite his public pronouncements, his revolutionary challenge to Ford, along with his political career, would have ended unceremoniously. He would have made a gracious exit speech, cut a deal with the Ford forces to eliminate his campaign debt, made a minor speech at the Kansas City Convention later that year, and returned to his ranch in Santa Barbara. He would probably have only reemerged to make speeches and cut radio commercials to supplement his income. And Reagan would have faded into political oblivion.

=== Torrijos–Carter treaties ===
Helms was a long-time opponent of transferring possession of the Panama Canal to Panama, calling its construction a "historic American achievement". He warned that it would fall into the hands of Omar Torrijos's "communist friends". The issue of transfer of the canal was debated in the 1976 presidential race, wherein then-President Ford suspended negotiations over the transfer of sovereignty to assuage conservative opposition. In 1977, President Jimmy Carter reopened negotiations, appointing Sol Linowitz as co-negotiator without Senate confirmation, and Helms and Strom Thurmond led the opposition to the transfer. Helms claimed that Linowitz's involvement with Marine Midland constituted a conflict of interests, arguing that it constituted a bailout of American banking interests. He filed two federal suits, demanding prior congressional approval of any treaty and then consent by both houses of Congress. Helms also rallied Reagan, telling him that negotiation over Panama would be a "second Schweiker" as far as his conservative base was concerned.

When Carter announced, on August 10, 1977, the conclusion of the treaties, Helms declared it a constitutional crisis, cited the need for the support of United States' allies in Latin America, accused the U.S. of submitting to Panamanian blackmail, and complained that the decision threatened national security in the event of war in Europe. Helms threatened to obstruct Senate business, proposing 200 amendments to the revision of the United States criminal code, knowing that most Americans opposed the treaties and would punish congressmen who voted for them if the ratification vote came in the run-up to the election. Helms announced the results of an opinion poll showing 78% public opposition. However, Helms's and Thurmond's leadership of the opposition made it politically easier for Carter, causing them to be replaced by the soft-spoken Paul Laxalt.

=== 1978 re-election campaign ===
Helms began campaigning for re-election in February 1977, giving himself 15 months by the time of the primaries. While he faced no primary opponent, the Democrats nominated Commissioner of Insurance John Ingram, who came from behind in the first round of the primary to win in the run-off. Ingram was known as an eccentric populist and used low-budget campaigning, just as he had in winning the primary. He campaigned almost exclusively on the issue of insurance rates and against "fat cats and special interests", in which he included Helms. Helms was one of three senators given a 100% rating by the conservative Americans for Constitutional Action for 1977, and was ranked fourth-most conservative by others. The Democratic National Committee targeted Helms, as did President Carter, who visited North Carolina twice on Ingram's behalf.

In June 1978, along with Strom Thurmond, Helms was one of two senators named by an environmental group as part of a congressional "Dirty Dozen" that the group believed should be defeated in their re-election efforts due to their stances on environmental issues; membership on the list was based "primarily on 14 Senate and 19 House votes, including amendments to air and water pollution control laws, strip‐mining controls, auto emissions and water projects".

Over the long campaign, Helms raised $7.5 million, more than twice as much as the second most-expensive nationwide (John Tower's in Texas), thanks to Richard Viguerie's and Alex Castellanos's pioneering direct mail strategies. It was estimated that at least $3 million of Helms's contributions were spent on fund-raising. Helms easily outspent Ingram several times over, as the latter spent $150,000. Due to a punctured lumbar disc, Helms was forced to suspend campaigning for six weeks in September and October. In a low-turnout election, Helms received 619,151 votes (54.5 percent) to Ingram's 516,663 (45.5 percent). Celebrating his victory, Helms told his supporters that it was a "victory for the conservative and the free enterprise cause throughout America", adding, "I'm Senator No and I'm glad to be here!"

== Second Senate term (1979–1985) ==
=== New Senate term ===
On January 3, 1979, the first day of the new Congress, Helms introduced a constitutional amendment outlawing abortion, on which he led the conservative senators. Senator Helms was one of several Republican senators who in 1981 called into the White House to express his discontent over the nomination of Sandra Day O'Connor to the U.S. Supreme Court; their opposition hinged over the issue of O'Connor's presumed unwillingness to overturn the Roe v. Wade ruling. Helms was also the Senate conservatives' leader on school prayer. An amendment proposed by Helms allowing voluntary prayer was passed by the Senate, but died in the House committee. To that act, Helms also proposed an amendment banning sex education without written parental consent. In 1979, Helms and Democrat Patrick Leahy supported a federal Taxpayer Bill of Rights.

He joined the Senate Foreign Relations Committee, being one of four men critical of Carter who were new to the committee. Leader of the pro-Taiwan congressional lobby, Helms demanded that the People's Republic of China reject the use of force against the Republic of China, but, much to his shock, the Carter administration did not ask them to rule it out.

Helms also criticized the government over Zimbabwe Rhodesia, leading support for the Internal Settlement government under Abel Muzorewa, and campaigned along with Samuel Hayakawa for the immediate lifting of sanctions on Muzorewa's government. Helms complained that it was inconsistent to lift sanctions on Uganda immediately after Idi Amin's departure, but not Zimbabwe Rhodesia after Ian Smith's. Helms hosted Muzorewa when he visited Washington and met with Carter in July 1979. He sent two aides to the Lancaster House Conference because he did not "trust the State Department on this issue", thereby provoking British diplomatic complaints. His aide John Carbaugh was accused of encouraging Smith to "hang on" and take a harder line, implying that there was enough support in the US Senate to lift sanctions without a settlement. Helms introduced legislation that demanded immediate lifting of the sanctions; as negotiations progressed, Helms complied more with the administration's line, although Senator Ted Kennedy accused Carter of conceding the construction of a new aircraft carrier in return for Helms's acquiescence on Zimbabwe Rhodesia, which both parties denied. Helms's support for lifting sanctions on Zimbabwe Rhodesia may have been grounded in North Carolina's tobacco traders, who would have been the main group benefiting from unilaterally lifting sanctions on tobacco-exporting Zimbabwe Rhodesia.

=== 1980 presidential election ===
In 1979, Helms was touted as a potential contender for the Republican nomination for the 1980 presidential election, but had poor voter recognition, and he lagged far behind the front-runners. He was the only candidate to file for the New Hampshire Vice-Presidential primary. Going into 1980, he was suggested as a potential running mate for Reagan, and said he'd accept if he could "be his own man". He was one of three conservative candidates running for the nomination. However, his ideological agreement with Reagan risked losing moderates' votes, particularly due to the independent candidacy of Rep. John B. Anderson, and the Reagan camp was split: eventually designating George H. W. Bush as his preferred candidate. At the convention, Helms toyed with the idea of running for vice-president despite Reagan's choice, but let it go in exchange for Bush's endorsing the party platform and allowing Helms to address the convention. As expected, Helms was drafted by conservatives anyway, and won 54 votes, coming second. Helms was the "spiritual leader of the conservative convention", and led the movement that successfully reversed the Republican Party's 36-year platform support for an Equal Rights Amendment.

In the fall of 1980, Helms proposed another bill denying the Supreme Court jurisdiction over school prayer, but this found little support in committee. It was strongly opposed by mainline Protestant churches, and its counterpart was defeated in the House. Senators Helms and James A. McClure blocked Ted Kennedy's comprehensive criminal code that did not relax federal firearms restrictions, inserted capital punishment procedures, and reinstated current statutory law on pornography, prostitution, and drug possession. Following from his success at reintroducing gold-indexed contracts in 1977, in October 1980, Helms proposed a return to the gold standard, and successfully passed an amendment setting up a commission to look into gold-backed currency. After the presidential election, Helms and Strom Thurmond sponsored a Senate amendment to a Department of Justice appropriations bill denying the Department the power to participate in busing, due to objections over federal involvement, but, although passed by Congress, was vetoed by a lame duck Carter. Helms pledged to introduce an even stronger anti-busing bill as soon as Reagan took office.

=== Republicans take the Senate ===
In the 1980 Senate election, the Republicans unexpectedly won a majority, their first in twenty-six years, including John Porter East, a social conservative and a Helms protégé soon dubbed "Helms on Wheels", winning the other North Carolina seat. Howard Baker was set to become Majority Leader, but conservatives, angered by Baker's support for the Panama treaty, SALT II, and the Equal Rights Amendment, had sought to replace him with Helms until Reagan gave Baker his backing. Although, it was thought they'd put Helms in charge of the Foreign Relations Committee instead of the liberal Charles H. Percy, he instead became chairman of the Senate Agriculture, Nutrition and Forestry Committee in the new Congress.

The first six months of 1981 were consumed by numerous Foreign Relations Committee confirmation hearings, which were held up by Helms, who believed many of the appointees too liberal or too tainted by association with Kissinger, and not dedicated enough to his definition of the "Reagan program": support for South Africa, Taiwan, and Latin American right-wing regimes (as opposed to Black Africa and "Red" China). These nominations included Alexander Haig, Chester Crocker, John J. Louis Jr., and Lawrence Eagleburger, all of whom were confirmed regardless, while all of Helms's candidates were rejected. Helms also, unsuccessfully, opposed the nominations of Caspar Weinberger, Donald Regan, and Frank Carlucci. However, he did score a notable coup two years later when he led a small group of conservatives to block the nomination of Robert T. Grey for nine months, thus causing the firing of Eugene V. Rostow.

=== Food stamp program ===
An opponent of the Food Stamp Program, Helms had already voted to reduce its scope, and was determined to follow this through as Agriculture Committee chairman. At one point, he proposed a 40% cut in their funding. Instead, Helms supported the replacement of food stamps with workfare.

=== Economic policies ===
Helms supported the gold standard through his role as the Agriculture Committee chairman, which exercises wide powers over commodity markets. During the budget crisis of 1981, he restored $200 million for school lunches by instead cutting foreign aid, and against increases in grain and milk price support, despite the importance of the dairy industry to North Carolina. He warned repeatedly against costly farm subsidies as chairman. However, in 1983, he used his position to lobby to use the country's strategic dairy and wheat stocks to subsidize food exports as part of a trade war with the European Union. Helms heavily opposed cutting food aid to Poland after martial law was declared, and called for the end of grain exports to (and arms limitation talks with) the Soviet Union instead.

In 1982, Helms authored a bill to introduce a federal flat tax of 10% with a personal allowance of $2,000. He voted against the 1983 budget, the only conservative senator to have done so, and was a leading voice for a balanced budget amendment. With Charlie Rose, he proposed a bill that would limit tobacco price supports, but would allow the transfer of subsidy credits from non-farmers to farmers. He co-sponsored the bi-partisan move in 1982 to extend drug patent duration. Helms continued to pose obstacles to Reagan's budget plans. At the end of the 97th Congress, Helms led a filibuster against Reagan's increase of the federal gasoline tax by 5-cents per gallon: mirroring his opposition to Governor Jim Hunt's 3-cent increase in the North Carolina gasoline tax, but alienating the White House from Helms.

=== Social issues ===
Although Helms recognized budget concerns and nominations as predominant, he rejected calls by Baker to move debate on social issues to 1982, with conservatives seeking to discuss abortion, school prayer, the minimum wage, and the "fair housing" policy. With the new Congress, Helms and Robert K. Dornan again proposed an amendment banning abortion in all circumstances, and also proposed a bill defining fetuses as human beings, thereby taking it out of the hands of the federal courts, along with Illinois Republican Henry Hyde and Kentucky Democrat Romano Mazzoli. More successfully, Helms passed an amendment banning federal funds from being used for abortion unless the woman's life is in danger. His support was key to the nomination of C. Everett Koop as Surgeon General, by proposing lifting the age limit that would otherwise have ruled out Koop. He proposed an amendment taking school prayer out of the remit of the Supreme Court, which was criticized for being unconstitutional; despite Reagan's endorsement, the bill was eventually rejected, after twenty months of dispute and numerous filibusters, in September 1982, by 51–48. Helms and Strom Thurmond sponsored another amendment to prevent the Department of Justice filing suits in defence of federal busing, which he contended wasted taxpayer money without improving education; this was filibustered by Lowell Weicker for eight months, but passed in March 1982. However, Democratic Speaker of the House Tip O'Neill blocked the measure from being considered by the House of Representatives.

In 1981, Helms started secret negotiations to end an 11-year impasse and pave the way for desegregation of historically white and historically black colleges in North Carolina. In response to a rival anti-discrimination bill in 1982, he proposed a bill outlawing granting tax-free status to schools that discriminated racially, but allowing schools that discriminate on the grounds of religion to avoid taxes. When the Voting Rights Act came up for amendment in 1982, Helms and Thurmond criticized it for bias against the South, arguing that it made Carolinians "second-class citizens" by treating their states differently, and proposed an amendment that extended its terms to the whole country, which they knew would bury it. However, it was extended anyway, despite Helms's filibuster, which he promised to lead "until the cows come home". In 1983, Helms hired Claude Allen, an African American, as his press secretary. Despite his publicly aired belief that he was one of the best-liked senators amongst black staff in Congress, it was pointed out that he did not have any African-American staff of his own, prompting the hiring of the twenty-two-year-old, who had switched parties when he was press secretary to Bill Cobey in the previous year's campaign.

In 1983, Helms led the 16-day filibuster in the Senate opposing the proposed establishment of Martin Luther King Day as a federal holiday. Helms and others claimed, "another federal holiday would be costly for the economy." Although the Congressional Budget Office cited a cost of $18 million, Helms claimed it would cost $12 billion a year. Helms "distributed a 300-page packet claiming that the civil rights leader was a political radical who adopted "action-oriented Marxism" and detailing Dr. King's supposed treachery" in which he accused King of "appear[ing] to have welcomed collaboration with Communists", Stanley Levison and Jack O'Dell. Helms ended the filibuster in exchange for a new tobacco bill. President Reagan signed the bill on October 19, 1983. Helms then demanded that FBI surveillance tapes allegedly detailing philandering on King's part be released, although Reagan and the courts refused. The conservatives attempted to rename the day "National Equality Day" or "National Civil Rights Day", but failed, and the bill was passed. Writing in The Washington Post several years later, David Broder attributed Helms' opposition to the MLK holiday to racism on Helms's part.

=== Latin America ===
Upon the Republican takeover of the Senate, Helms became chairman of the Subcommittee on Western Hemisphere Affairs, promising to "review all our policies on Latin America", of which he had been severely critical under Carter. He immediately focused on escalating aid to the Salvadoran government in its civil war, and particularly preventing Nicaraguan and Cuban support for guerrillas in El Salvador. Within hours, the subcommittee approved military aid to El Salvador, and later led the push to cut aid to Nicaragua. Helms was assisted in pursuing the foreign policy realignment by John Carbaugh, whose influence The New York Times reported "[rivalled] many of [the Senate's] more visible elected members".

In El Salvador, Helms had close ties with the right-wing Salvadoran Nationalist Republican Alliance and its leader and death squad founder Roberto D'Aubuisson. Helms opposed the appointment of Thomas R. Pickering as Ambassador to El Salvador. Helms alleged that the CIA had interfered in the Salvadoran election March and May 1984, in favor of the incumbent centre-left José Napoleón Duarte instead of D'Aubuisson, claiming that Pickering had "used the cloak of diplomacy to strangle freedom in the night". A CIA operative testifying to the Senate Intelligence Committee was alleged by Helms to have admitted rigging the election, but senators that attended have stated that, whilst the CIA operative admitted involvement, they did not make such an admission. Helms disclosed details of CIA financial support for Duarte, earning a rebuke from Barry Goldwater, but Helms replied that his information came from sources in El Salvador, not the Senate committee.

In 1982, Helms was the only senator who opposed a Senate resolution endorsing a pro-British policy during the Falklands War, citing the Monroe Doctrine, although he did manage to weaken the resolution's language. Nonetheless, Helms was a supporter of the Chilean dictator General Augusto Pinochet, who supported the United Kingdom in the Falklands conflict. Helms was steadfastly opposed to the Castro regime in Cuba, and spent much of his time campaigning against the lifting of sanctions. In 1980, he opposed a treaty with Cuba on sea boundary delimitation unless it included withdrawal of the Soviet brigade stationed on the island. The following year, he proposed legislation establishing Radio Free Cuba, which would later become known as Radio Martí.

=== 1984 re-election campaign ===
Halfway through Reagan's term, Helms was talked about as a prospective presidential candidate in 1984 in case Reagan chose to stand down after his first term. There was also speculation that Helms would run for the Governorship, being vacated by Jim Hunt. However, the President stood for re-election, and Helms ran once more for his Senate seat—facing Governor Hunt—and becoming the top target among the incumbent Senate Republicans.

Unlike in 1978, Helms faced an opponent in the primary, George Wimbish, but won with 90.6% of the vote, while Hunt received 77% in his. During the general election campaign, Hunt accused Helms of having the most "anti-Israel record of any member of the U.S. Senate". Helms pledged during the campaign that he would retain his chairmanship of the Agriculture committee.

In the most expensive Senate campaign up to that time, Helms narrowly defeated Hunt, taking 1,156,768 (51.7%) to Hunt's 1,070,488 (47.8%).

== Third Senate term (1985–1991) ==
In 1989, Helms hired James Meredith, most famous as the first African American ever admitted to the University of Mississippi, as a domestic policy adviser to his Senate office staff. Meredith noted that Helms was the only member of the Senate to respond to his offer.

In 1989, Helms successfully lobbied for an amendment to the Americans with Disabilities Act, legislation protecting disability rights that exempted pedophilia, schizophrenia, and kleptomania from the conditions against which discrimination was barred. Additionally, Helms proposed an amendment to exempt transvestism, which the Senate adopted. Even though the Helms amendments were kept in the final ADA bill that passed Congress in 1990, Helms twice voted against the bill.

=== Foreign policy ===
Although Helms was returned to office, and became the senior Republican on the Foreign Relations Committee, Richard Lugar of Indiana became its chair, after Helms and Lugar cut a deal to keep liberals out of top committee posts. Despite pressure to claim the Foreign Relations chair, Helms kept the Agriculture chair, as he had pledged in his campaign.

A "purge" of the State Department by George P. Shultz in early 1985, replacing conservatives with moderates, was heavily opposed by the Helms-led conservatives. They unsuccessfully attempted to block the appointment of Rozanne L. Ridgway, Richard Burt, and Edwin G. Corr as ambassadors, arguing that Shultz was appointing diplomats who were not loyal to President Reagan's philosophy, particularly in Latin America. In August 1985, Helms threatened to lead a filibuster against a bill imposing sanctions on South Africa, delaying it until after summer recess.

In early 1986, Panamanian dissident Winston Spadafora visited Helms and requested that the Subcommittee on Western Hemisphere Affairs hold hearings on Panama. Ignoring Elliott Abrams' request for a softer line towards Panama, Helms—a long-time critic of Noriega—agreed, and the hearings uncovered the large degree of leeway that the U.S. government, and particularly the Central Intelligence Agency, had been giving to Noriega. After the Drug Enforcement Administration encountered opposition from Oliver North in investigating Noriega's role in drug trafficking, Helms teamed up with John Kerry to introduce an amendment to the Intelligence Authorization Act demanding that the CIA investigate the Panama Defense Forces' potential involvement. In 1988, after Noriega was indicted on charges including drug trafficking, a former Panamanian consul general and chief of political intelligence testified to the subcommittee, detailing Panama's compiling of evidence on its political opponents in the United States, including Senators Helms and Ted Kennedy, with the assistance of the CIA and National Security Council. Helms proposed that the government suspend the Carter-Torrijos treaties unless Noriega were extradited within thirty days.

In July 1986, after Rodrigo Rojas DeNegri was burned alive during a street demonstration against the dictatorship of General Augusto Pinochet in Chile, Helms said that DeNegri and his companion Carmen Quintana Arancibia were "Communist terrorists" who had earlier been sighted setting fire to a barricade. Helms also criticized United States Ambassador to Chile Harry G. Barnes Jr. for attending DeNegri's funeral, saying Barnes "planted the American flag in the midst of a Communist activity" and President Reagan would have sent him home were he there. The following month, the Justice Department disclosed information to Senate Select Committee on Intelligence that linked Helms and a sensitive intelligence matter of the Chile government. Helms responded to the disclosure by telling reporters that the Justice Department "want to intimidate me and harass me, and it's not going to work" and said that both the Justice Department and himself were aware he had "violated no rules of classification". In a letter to Attorney General Edwin Meese, Helms made a request of the Justice Department to investigate if he or members of his staff had been spied on during the Chile visit and called the charges against him "frivolous and false indictment".

Helms became interested in the Vietnam War POW/MIA issue, and in October 1990 his committee staff chief and longest-serving aide, James P. Lucier, prepared a report stating that it was probable there were live American prisoners still being held in Vietnam and that the George H. W. Bush administration was complicit in hiding the facts. The report also alleged that the Soviet Union had held American prisoners after the end of World War II, and more may have been transferred there during the Korean War and during the Vietnam War. (Lucier also believed that survivors of the 1983 shoot-down of Korean Air Lines Flight 007 were being held prisoner by the Soviets.) Helms stated that the "deeper story" was a possible "deliberate effort by certain people in the government to disregard all information or reports about living MIA-POWs". This was followed up in May 1991 by a minority report of the Foreign Relations Committee, released by Helms and titled An Examination of US Policy Toward POW/MIAs, which made similar claims and concluded that "any evidence that suggested an MIA might be alive was uniformly and arbitrarily rejected ..." The issuing of the report caused other Republicans on the committee to become angry, and charges were made that the report contained errors, innuendo, and unsubstantiated rumors. This and other personnel matters led to Helms firing Lucier and eight other staff members in January 1992. Helms subsequently distanced himself from the POW/MIA issue. (The aides claimed vindication later in 1992 when Russian president Boris Yeltsin said that the Soviet Union had kept some U.S. prisoners in the early 1950s.)

=== HIV legislation ===
In 1987, Helms added an amendment to the Supplemental Appropriations Act, which directed the president to use executive authority to add HIV infection to the list of excludable diseases that prevent both travel and immigration to the United States. The action was opposed by the U.S. Public Health Service. Congress restored the executive authority to remove HIV from the list of excludable conditions in the 1990 Immigration Reform Act, and in January 1991, Secretary of Health and Human Services Louis W. Sullivan announced he would delete HIV from the list of excludable conditions. A letter-writing campaign headed by Helms ultimately convinced President Bush not to lift the ban, and left the United States the only industrialized nation in the world to prohibit travel based on HIV status. The travel ban was also responsible for the cancellation of the 1992 International AIDS Conference in Boston. On January 5, 2010, the 22-year-old ban was lifted after having been signed by President Barack Obama on October 30, 2009.

Helms was "bitterly opposed" to federal financing for research and treatment of AIDS, which he believed was God's punishment for homosexuals. He introduced an amendment to a 1987 spending bill that prohibited the use of federal tax dollars for any AIDS educational materials that would "promote or encourage, directly or indirectly, homosexual activities".

Opposing the Kennedy-Hatch AIDS bill in 1988, Helms incorrectly stated, "There is not one single case of AIDS in this country that cannot be traced in origin to sodomy". When Ryan White, who contracted AIDS through a blood transfusion he received at age 13, died in 1990, his mother went to Congress to speak to politicians on behalf of people with AIDS. She spoke to 23 representatives; Helms refused to speak to Jeanne White, even when she was alone with him in an elevator. Despite opposition by Helms, the Ryan White Care Act passed in 1990.

In 1988, Helms convinced congress to implement a ban on federal funding for needle exchange programs, arguing that spending federal money on such programs was tantamount to "federal endorsement of drug abuse".

As late as 2002, Helms continued to claim that the "homosexual lifestyle" was the cause of the spread of AIDS in the United States, and he remained opposed to spending money on AIDS research.

=== 1990 re-election campaign ===
In the 1990 Republican primary, Helms had two opponents, George Wimbish (as in 1984) and L.C. Nixon; Helms won with 84.3% of the vote. The general election was nationally publicized and rancorous. Helms ran against former Charlotte mayor Harvey Gantt in his "bid to become the nation's only black senator" and "the first black elected to the Senate from the South since Reconstruction".

A 1991 report by the U.S. Department of Justice Civil Rights Division recommending a lawsuit against the North Carolina Republican Party and the Helms for Senate Committee, et al.

The North Carolina GOP and others mailed over 125,000 notices (almost exclusively to black voters) telling them that they were not eligible to vote and warned that if they went to the polls they could be prosecuted for voter fraud. At the behest of several civil rights groups and the Democratic National Party, the US Department of Justice sued the Helms campaign, the NC GOP, four lobbying firms and two individual lobbyists. Thomas Farr, campaign manager for Helms, disavowed any knowledge of the dirty tricks, which was shown to be false when his hand written notes were discovered. The affected parties acknowledged and agreed to the Justice Departments' ruling and were forced to desist from any other such activities.

Helms aired a late-running television commercial titled "Hands", also known as 'White Hands,' that showed a white man's hands crumpling up an employment rejection notice while a voiceover said, "You needed that job, and you were the best qualified. But they had to give it to a minority because of a racial quota. Is that really fair? Harvey Gantt says it is." The advertisement was produced by Alex Castellanos, whom Helms would employ until his company was dropped in April 1996 after running an ad that was "unusually hard-hitting for primary season, labeling both contenders in the Democratic Senate primary as extreme, gay-rights-supporting liberals". Another Helms television commercial accused Gantt of running a "secret campaign" in homosexual communities and of being committed to "mandatory gay rights laws" including "requiring local schools to hire gay teachers".

Helms won the election with 1,087,331 votes (52.5 percent) to Gantt's 981,573 (47.4 percent). In his victory statement, Helms noted the unhappiness of some media outlets over his victory, paraphrasing a line from Casey at the Bat: "There's no joy in Mudville tonight. The mighty ultra-liberal establishment, and the liberal politicians and editors and commentators and columnists have struck out."

== Fourth Senate term (1991–1997) ==
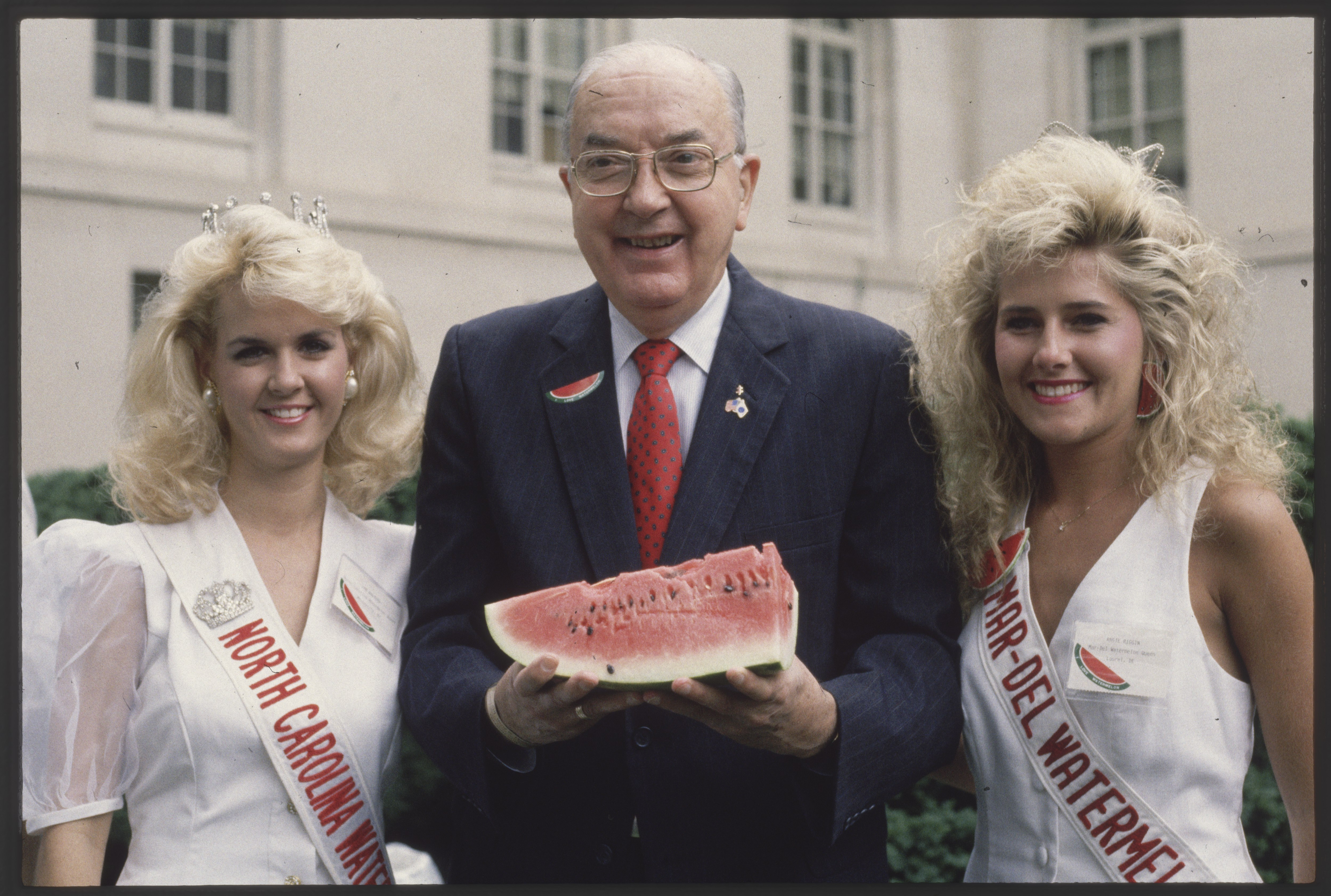
Senator Helms holding a watermelon and standing between Miss North Carolina and the Mar-Del Watermelon Queen in 1991

In the early 1990s, Helms was a vocal opponent of the North American Free Trade Agreement (NAFTA).

In August 1991, Helms became one of six Republicans on the Select Senate Committee on POW-MIA Affairs that would investigate the number of Americans still missing in the aftermath of the Vietnam War following renewed interest.

During this term, Helms was one of three senators to vote against the confirmation of Ruth Bader Ginsburg to the Supreme Court.

=== Keating Five investigation ===
On August 5, 1991, Helms made public a special counsel report calling for California Senator Alan Cranston to be censured by the Senate on charges of reprehensible conduct. The document had been delivered to members of the Senate Ethics Committee the previous month. Helms stated that his move came from the belief that the release would cause the panel to act faster, additionally citing the panel members with being at odds on how much of the report should be released as a reason for not closing an inquiry into Charles H. Keating Jr. and his role in the savings and loan scandal of the late 1980s.

The Senate Ethics Committee subsequently voted to investigate Helms for releasing the confidential document. Helms issued a statement saying in part that it was "a fascinating suggestion that I may have somehow violated some unspecified 'rule' when I released, over the weekend, my own signed report regarding the Keating Five investigation". Helms welcomed the investigation into himself, along with one into the handling of the Keating Five case (five senators who received financial contributions from Keating Jr.) by the Senate Ethics Committee, calling the panel's investigation "long, arduous and expensive" and noting a potential public investigation "may disclose that the committee labored and brought forth a mouse".

=== National Endowment for the Arts ===
In 1989, the National Endowment for the Arts awarded grants for a retrospective of Robert Mapplethorpe photographs, some of which containing homosexual themes, in addition to a museum in Winston-Salem, North Carolina, supporting an exhibition that featured an image by Andres Serrano of a crucifix suspended in urine. These images caused an uproar and marked the National Endowment for the Arts becoming "a favorite target for Mr. Helms and other conservative senators who have objected to the work of some of the artists who have received Government grants." In September 1989, Helms met with John E. Frohnmayer, President Bush's appointee for Chairman of the National Endowment for the Arts. While neither spoke publicly about the meeting, Helms reportedly made it clear that he considered his opposition to certain N.E.A. grants to be an election issue, and his opposition would continue after the next election.

In September 1991, Helms charged the National Endowment for the Arts with financing art that would turn "the stomach of any normal person" while proposing an amendment to an appropriations bill forbidding the usage of the grants for the N.E.A. in promoting material that would be deemed as depicting "sexual or excretory activities or organs" in an "offensive way". On September 20, the Senate voted 68 to 28 in favor of the amendment. The same night, Helms withdrew another amendment that changed the financing formula of the N.E.A. to funneling over half of its grant money through states as opposed to the Washington headquarters and would see a reduction in the New York fiscal year appropriation from its 26 million to just over 7 million.

=== Remarks regarding Moseley Braun and Clinton ===
In a widely publicized incident on July 22, 1993, Carol Moseley Braun, the first black woman in the Senate and the only black senator at the time, reported that Helms deliberately sought to offend her by whistling the song "Dixie" as the two shared an elevator. After Moseley Braun persuaded the Senate to vote against Helms's amendment to extend the patent of the United Daughters of the Confederacy insignia, which included the Confederate flag, Moseley Braun claims that Helms ran into her in an elevator. Helms allegedly turned to Senator Orrin Hatch and said, "Watch me make her cry. I'm going to make her cry. I'm going to sing 'Dixie' until she cries." He then allegedly proceeded to sing the song about "the good life" during slavery to Moseley Braun. In 1999, Helms unsuccessfully attempted to block Moseley Braun's nomination to be United States Ambassador to New Zealand.

In 1994, Helms created a sensation when he told broadcasters Rowland Evans and Robert Novak that Clinton was "not up" to the tasks of being commander-in-chief, and suggested two days later, on the anniversary of John F. Kennedy's assassination, "Mr. Clinton better watch out if he comes down here. He'd better have a bodyguard." Helms said Clinton was unpopular and that he had not meant it as a threat. Clinton addressed the comments when asked about them by a reporter at a press conference the following day: "I think the remarks were unwise and inappropriate. The President oversees the foreign policy of the United States. And the Republicans will decide in whom they will repose their trust and confidence; that's a decision for them to make, not for me."

=== Republican majority ===
Republicans regained control of Congress after the 1994 elections and Helms finally became the chairman of the Senate Foreign Relations Committee. He was the first North Carolinian to chair the committee since Nathaniel Macon. In that role, Helms pushed for reform of the UN and blocked payment of the United States' dues. Helms secured sufficient reforms that a colleague, future president Joe Biden of Delaware said that "As only Nixon could go to China, only Helms could fix the U.N."

Helms passed few laws of his own in part because of this bridge-burning style. Hedrick Smith's The Power Game portrays Helms as a "devastatingly effective power broker".

Helms tried to block the refunding of the Ryan White Care Act in 1995, saying that those with AIDS were responsible for the disease, because they had contracted it because of their "deliberate, disgusting, revolting conduct", and that the reason AIDS existed in the first place was because it was "God's punishment for homosexuals". Helms also claimed that more federal dollars were spent on AIDS than heart disease or cancer, despite this not being borne out by the Public Health Service statistics.

=== Helms–Burton Act ===
Soon after becoming the chair of the Senate Foreign Relations Committee, in February 1995, Helms announced that he wished to strengthen the spirit of the 1992 Torricelli Act with new legislation. Its companion sponsored through the House by Dan Burton of Indiana, it would strengthen the embargo against Cuba: further codifying the embargo, instructing United States diplomats to vote in favor of sanctions on Cuba, stripping the president of the option of ending the embargo by executive order until Fidel and Raúl Castro leave power and a prescribed course of transition is followed. The bill also, controversially explicitly overruling the Act of State Doctrine, allowed foreign companies to be sued in American courts if, in dealings with the regime of Fidel Castro, they acquired assets formerly owned by Americans.

Passing the House comfortably, the Senate was far more cautious, under pressure from the Clinton administration. The debate was filibustered, with a motion of cloture falling four votes short. Helms reintroduced the bill without Titles III and IV, which detailed the penalties on investors, and it passed by 74 to 24 on October 19, 1995. A conference committee was scheduled to convene, but did not until February 28, 1996, by which time external events had taken over. On February 24, Cuba shot down two small Brothers to the Rescue planes piloted by anti-Castro Cuban-Americans. When the conference committee met, the tougher House version, with all four titles, won out on most substantive points. It was passed by the Senate 74–22 and the House 336–86, and President Clinton signed the Helms-Burton Act into law on March 12, 1996. For years after its passing, Helms criticized the corporate interests that sought to lift the sanctions on Cuba, writing an article in 1999 for Foreign Affairs, at whose publisher, the Council on Foreign Relations, also drew Helms's ire for its softer approach to Cuba.

=== 1996 re-election campaign ===
In 1996, Helms drew 1,345,833 (52.6 percent) to Gantt's 1,173,875 (45.9 percent). Helms supported his former Senate colleague Bob Dole for president, while Gantt endorsed Bill Clinton. Although Helms is generally credited with being the most successful Republican politician in North Carolina history, his largest proportion of the vote in any of his five elections was 54.5 percent. In North Carolina, Helms was a polarizing figure, and he freely admitted that many people in the state strongly disliked him: "[The Democrats] could nominate Mortimer Snerd and he'd automatically get 45 percent of the vote." Helms was particularly popular among older, conservative constituents, and was considered one of the last "Old South" politicians to have served in the Senate. However, he also considered himself a voice of conservative youth, whom he hailed in the dedication of his autobiography.

== Fifth Senate term (1997–2003) ==
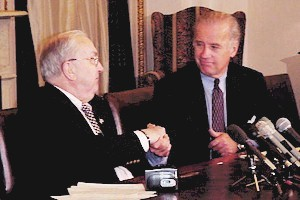
Helms with Joe Biden in 1999

=== Weld ambassadorial nomination ===
The summer of 1997 saw Helms engage in a protracted, high-profile battle to block the nomination of William Weld, Republican governor of Massachusetts, as Ambassador to Mexico, refusing to hold a committee meeting to schedule a confirmation hearing. Although he did not make a formal statement of his reason, Helms did criticize Weld's support for medical marijuana, which Senate conservatives saw as incompatible with Mexico's key role in the war on drugs. Weld attacked Helms's politics, saying, "I am not Senator Helms's kind of Republican. I do not pass his litmus test on social policy. Nor do I want to." This opened Helms to counter on Weld's positions on abortion, gay rights, and other issues on which he had a liberal position. Other factors, such as Weld's noncommittal position on Helms's chairmanship during his 1996 Senate campaign and Weld's wife's donation to the Gantt campaign, made the nomination personal and less cooperative. Held up in the committee by Helms, despite Weld resigning his governorship to concentrate on the nomination and a petition signed by most senators, his nomination died.

=== Cuba ===
In January 1998, Helms endorsed a legislative proposal by the Cuban-American National Foundation to provide $100 million worth of food and medicine so long as Havana could promise the assistance would not be allocated to government stores or officials of the Communist Party. In the same statement, Helms said Pope John Paul II's visit to Cuba had "created a historic opportunity for bold action" in the country. On May 15, Helms announced a proposal of $100 million aid package for Cuba that would provide food and medical assistance to the Cuban people by the Roman Catholic Church and politically independent relief organizations. Helms stated the proposal would hurt Castro's regime if he either accepted or rejected it and the proposal was endorsed by more than twenty senators from both parties. In his memoir, Helms stated the only reason Castro was able to maintain leadership in Cuba was the direct result of the Clinton administration not making his removal an objective of its foreign policy. He asserted the administration should have worked to develop strategies to undermine Castro and instead spent years "wasting precious time and energy on a senseless debate over whether to lift the Cuban embargo unilaterally".

Helms saw the Bush administration as "understanding of the nature" of Castro and his crimes and stated his hope that an American president would eventually be able to visit Cuba at a time when the latter country and the United States could welcome each other as friends and trading partners. In May 2001, Helms cosponsored legislation with Connecticut Democrat Joe Lieberman granting $100 million in aid to both government critics and independent workers in Cuba during the period of the following four years and said the aim of the bill was to provide financial assistance to domestic opponents of the Cuban government so that they could continue their work. The legislation was "the first major legislative proposal by hard-line critics" since the Helms–Burton Act and Helms promoted its enactment in a statement by saying it would see the United States government "move beyond merely isolating the Castro regime" which could be undermined "by finding bold, proactive and creative programs to help those working for change on the island". In July, President Bush announced his intent to waive a portion of the Helms–Burton Act authorizing lawsuits against businesses operating in Cuba for six months in the national interest of the US and to aid administration efforts to "expedite the transition to democracy in Cuba". Helms released a statement defending Bush, saying "it would be wise to consider the other salutary initiatives that the president is putting into force" before criticizing the decision and credited Bush with "taking a very tough line which is certain to make Fidel Castro squirm".

=== Final Senate years ===
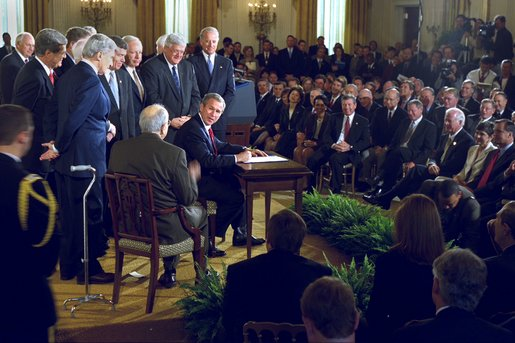
Helms watches President George W. Bush sign H.J. Resolution 114 authorizing the use of force against Iraq in 2002.

In January 1997, during the confirmation hearings for Secretary of State nominee Madeleine Albright, Helms stated President Clinton's first term had left adversaries of the United States in doubt of their resolve and that "a lot of Americans" were praying she would issue in a change during her tenure. Two months later, after being confirmed, Albright traveled with Helms to his boyhood home and the Jesse Helms Center for discussions on the treaty to ban chemical arms, Helms afterward saying the pair would not have any issues if they continued being able to cooperate but stressed that the treaty would not assist with protecting Americans. In a March 1998 letter to Albright, Helms stated his opposition "to the creation of a permanent U.N. criminal court" and the United Nations becoming "a sovereign entity", Helms spokesman Marc Thiessen confirming concerns of the senator "that a permanent tribunal will turn into a petty claims court that will spend its time taking up complaints about the United States" and thereby serve the function of the General Assembly.

In September 1997, amid the Senate voting to repeal a $50 billion tax break for the tobacco industry, Helms joined Mitch McConnell and Lauch Faircloth in being one of three senators to vote against the amendment.

In January 1998, President Clinton's relationship with Monica Lewinsky became public. Helms found the revelation "damning", having little patience for sexual transgressions and said anyone that would advocate President Clinton's "should be excused, already announced their total lack of character". In remarks the following month, Helms stated the scandal had left him saddened for the United States and President Clinton's daughter Chelsea. Helms exercised caution on the impeachment issue, refraining from announcing his vote until right before Clinton's Senate trial in January of the following year. The Washington Post noted Helms as the only one of the nine senators who had by then served a quarter century to vote in favor of Lewinsky making an appearance before the chamber. In his memoir, Helms stated that his vote against Clinton was not personal and that he understood "the fallibility of every human, and the power of Grace", but that he was unwilling to deny the Constitution not allowing "gradients of wrongdoing" since Clinton was proven to have lied under oath.

In March 1998, after the Senate Foreign Relations Committee voted to add Poland, Hungary and the Czech Republic into the North Atlantic Treaty Organization, Helms predicted the resolution would pass overwhelmingly in the full chamber and said the vote was a testament to "confidence in the democracies of Eastern Europe".

In May 1998, while delivering remarks to Therma, Inc. employees, President Clinton listed Helms as one of the senators who had aided the intent of Partnership for Peace.

While the United States cast one of four votes against the Rome Statute of the International Criminal Court, adopted by a 120 to 4 vote in July 1998, President Clinton signed the Statute for the United States. However, Helms was strident in his opposition and let it be known that any attempt to have the Senate ratify the Statute would be "dead on arrival" at the Foreign Relations Committee. He also introduced the American Service-Members' Protection Act, adopted by Congress in 2002 "to protect United States military personnel and other elected and appointed officials of the United States government against criminal prosecution by an international criminal court to which the United States is not party".

In June 1999, after President Clinton nominated Richard Holbrooke for United States Ambassador to the United Nations, the Clinton administration expressed concerns with Helms's silence on whether he would allow a vote on Holbrooke's nomination. In a June 5 statement, Helms announced the date of the four hearings and that Holbrooke would be questioned regarding his career, specifically his mediating role in negotiations of the Bosnia accords with President of Yugoslavia Slobodan Milošević. Helms added that he could not "recall another Cabinet-level nomination sent to this committee with so much ethical baggage attached to it". During the confirmation hearings, Helms stated that Holbrooke had violated the law repeatedly. In response, Holbrooke apologized and admitted to his "misconceptions" regarding ethics, Helms afterward expressing optimism toward the nomination as a result of Holbrooke's remorse. Three months later, after President Clinton nominating former senator Carol Moseley-Braun for United States Ambassador to New Zealand, Helms released a statement saying the "nomination comes to the Senate with an ethical cloud hanging over Ms. Moseley-Braun" and questioned if her record had even been examined by the Clinton administration. An article published around the same time as the statement by Roll Call indicated Helms would prevent the nomination unless Moseley-Braun "amends for past slights" such as her opposition to the renewal of the emblem for the Daughters of the Confederacy. Helms subsequently demanded documents relating to Moseley-Braun's ethical charges and delayed confirmation hearings until receiving them. On November 9, the Senate Foreign Relations Committee voted to endorse Moseley-Braun 17 to 1, Helms being the lone vote against the nomination. When the Senate voted to confirm Moseley-Braun, Helms was joined by Peter Fitzgerald, who defeated Moseley-Braun in her re-election bid, in being the only two senators to vote against her.

In 2000, Bono sought out Jesse Helms to discuss increasing American aid to Africa. In Africa, AIDS is a disease that is primarily transmitted heterosexually, and Helms sympathized with Bono's description of "the pain it is bringing to infants and children and their families". Helms insisted that Bono involve the international community and private sector, so that relief efforts would not be paid for by "just Americans". Helms coauthored a bill authorizing $600 million for international AIDS relief efforts. In 2002, Helms announced that he was ashamed to have done so little during his Senate career to fight the worldwide spread of AIDS, and pledged to do more during his last few months in the Senate. Helms spoke with special appreciation of the efforts of Janet Museveni, first lady of Uganda, for her efforts to stop the spread of AIDS through a campaign based on "biblical values and sexual purity". Helms also was a proponent in trying to dissolve the United States Agency for International Development.

In January 2001, Helms stated he would support an increase in international assistance on the condition that all future aid from the United States be provided to the needy by private charities and religious groups as opposed to a government agency, and endorsed abolishing the United States Agency for International Development and concurrently transferring its 7 billion in annual aid to another foundation which would give grants to private relief groups.

In March 2002, Helms and Democrat Joe Biden, in their positions as the ranking members of their parties on the Senate Foreign Relations Committee, submitted a letter to the Bush administration demanding the Senate receive any nuclear arms reductions with Russia as a formal treaty.

=== Retirement ===
Because of recurring health problems, including bone disorders, prostate cancer and heart disease, Helms did not seek re-election in 2002. His Senate seat was won by Republican Elizabeth Dole.

== Post-Senate life (2003–2008) ==
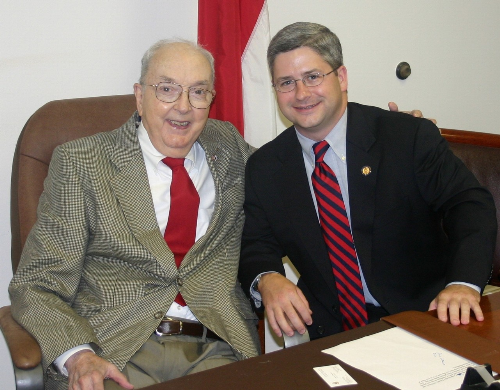
Helms with Patrick McHenry in 2005

In 2004, he spoke out for the election of Republican U.S. representative Richard Burr, who, like Elizabeth Dole two years earlier, defeated Democrat Erskine Bowles to win the other North Carolina Senate seat. In September 2005, Random House published his memoir Here's Where I Stand. In his memoirs, he likened abortion to the Holocaust and the September 11 terrorist attacks stating, "I will never be silent about the death of those who cannot speak for themselves."

In 1994, after turning down requests for his papers to be left to an Ivy League university, he designated Wingate University as the repository of the official papers and historical items from his Senate career, where the Jesse Helms Center is based to promote his legacy. In 2005, Liberty University opened the Jesse Helms School of Government with Helms present at the dedication.

=== Death ===
Helms's health remained poor after he retired from the Senate in 2003. In April 2006, news reports disclosed that Helms had vascular dementia, which leads to failing memory and diminished cognitive function, as well as a number of physical difficulties. He was later moved into a convalescent center near his home. Helms died of vascular dementia on July 4, 2008, at the age of 86. He is buried in Historic Oakwood Cemetery in Raleigh, North Carolina.

== Social and political views ==
=== Views on race ===
Jesse Helms was accused of racism throughout his career. Two years before Helms's 2003 retirement from the Senate, David Broder of The Washington Post wrote a column headlined "Jesse Helms, White Racist", analyzing Helms's public record on race, a record he felt many other reporters were side-stepping. He said that Helms was willing to inflame racial resentment against African Americans for political gain and dubbed Helms "the last prominent unabashed white racist politician in this country".

Early in his career, as news director for WRAL radio, Helms supported Willis Smith in the 1950 Democratic primary for the U.S. Senate, against Frank Porter Graham, in a campaign that used racial issues in a divisive way, in order to draw conservative white voters to the polls. Portraying Graham as favoring interracial marriages, the campaign circulated placards with the heading, "White people, wake up before it is too late"; and a handbill that showed Graham's wife dancing with a black man. When Smith won, Helms went to Washington as his administrative assistant.

Helms opposed busing, the Civil Rights Act, and enforcement of the Voting Rights Act. Helms called the Civil Rights Act of 1964 "the single most dangerous piece of legislation ever introduced in the Congress", and sponsored legislation to either extend it to the entire country or scrap it altogether. In 1982, he voted against the extension of the Voting Rights Act.

Helms reminded voters that he tried, with a 16-day filibuster, to stop the Senate from approving a federal holiday to honor Martin Luther King Jr., although he had fewer reservations about establishing a North Carolina state holiday for King. He was accused of being a segregationist by some political observers and scholars, such as USA Today's DeWayne Wickham who wrote that Helms "subtly carried the torch of white supremacy" from Ben Tillman. Helms never stated that segregation was morally wrong and expressed the belief that integration would have been achieved voluntarily but that it was forced by "outside agitators who had their own agendas".

In 1990, former Charlotte mayor Harvey Gantt ran against Helms in a "bid to become the nation's only black senator" and "the first black elected to the Senate from the South since Reconstruction". Helms aired a late-running television commercial titled "Hands", also known as "White Hands", that showed a white man's hands crumpling an employment rejection notice while a voiceover said, "You needed that job, and you were the best qualified. But they had to give it to a minority because of a racial quota. Is that really fair? Harvey Gantt says it is." During the same election, Helms's campaign mailed 125,000 postcards to households in predominantly African-American precincts falsely claiming if people voted without updating their addresses on the electoral register since their last move they could go to jail.

Helms was one of 52 senators to vote to confirm Clarence Thomas, an African American, to the Supreme Court as an associate justice in 1991.

In 1993, after Carol Moseley Braun, the first black woman in the Senate and the only black senator at the time, persuaded the Senate to vote against Helms's amendment to extend the patent of the United Daughters of the Confederacy insignia, which included the Confederate flag, Moseley Braun claimed Helms ran into her in an elevator, and that Helms turned to Senator Orrin Hatch and said, "Watch me make her cry. I'm going to make her cry. I'm going to sing "Dixie" until she cries," and proceeded to sing the song about "the good life" during slavery. In 1999, Helms unsuccessfully attempted to block Moseley Braun's nomination to be United States Ambassador to New Zealand.

Besides opposing civil rights and affirmative action legislation, Helms blocked many black judges from being considered for the federal bench, and black appointees to positions of prominence in the Federal Government. In one instance, he blocked attempts by President Bill Clinton over a period of years to appoint a black judge on the Fourth U.S. Circuit Court of Appeals. Only when Helms's own judicial choices were threatened with blocking did attorney Roger Gregory of Richmond, Virginia get confirmed.

=== Views on homosexuality ===
Nothing positive happened to Sodom and Gomorrah and nothing positive is likely to happen to America if our people succumb to the drumbeats of support for the homosexual lifestyle.

— Jesse Helms, The New York Times

Helms had a negative view of lesbian, gay, bisexual, and transgender (LGBT) people and LGBT rights in the United States. Helms called homosexuals "weak, morally sick wretches" and tried to cut funding for the National Endowment for the Arts for supporting the "gay-oriented artwork of photographer Robert Mapplethorpe". In 1993, when then-president Bill Clinton wanted to appoint 'out' lesbian Roberta Achtenberg to assistant secretary of the Department of Housing and Urban Development, Helms held up the confirmation "because she's a damn lesbian", adding "she's not your garden-variety lesbian. She's a militant-activist-mean lesbian". Helms also stated "I'm not going to put a lesbian in a position like that. If you want to call me a bigot, fine." When Clinton urged that gays be allowed to serve openly in the armed forces, Helms said the president "better have a bodyguard" if he visited North Carolina. His views on gay and lesbian citizens were depicted in the 1998 documentary film Dear Jesse.

Helms initially fought against increasing federal financing for HIV/AIDS research and treatment, saying the disease resulted from "unnatural" and "disgusting" homosexual behavior. In his final year in the Senate, he strongly supported AIDS measures in Africa, where heterosexual transmission of the disease is most common, and continued to hold the belief that the "homosexual lifestyle" is the cause of the spread of the epidemic in America.

During his 1990 campaign against Harvey Gantt, Helms ran television commercials accusing Gantt of running a "secret campaign" in homosexual communities and of being committed to "mandatory gay rights laws" including "requiring local schools to hire gay teachers".

In 1993, when he voted against confirming Ruth Bader Ginsburg to the Supreme Court, he cited her support for the "homosexual agenda" as one of his reasons for doing so.

In his 2017 memoir, Logical Family, gay author Armistead Maupin recalls that Helms described homosexuality as an "abomination" when he was working for him as a young man. Maupin adds that he later gave an interview about his first novel on the same TV station, and said, "I worked here when Jesse Helms was here. Now he's in Washington, ranting about militant homosexuals, and I'm out running around being one."

== Personal life ==
=== Family ===
Helms and his wife Dot had two daughters, Jane and Nancy, and adopted a nine-year-old orphan with cerebral palsy named Charles after reading in a newspaper that Charles wanted a mother and father for Christmas. The couple had seven grandchildren and one great-grandchild. One of his grandchildren, Jennifer Knox, later became a judge in Wake County, North Carolina.

=== Religious views ===
Atheism and socialism – or liberalism, which tends in the same direction – are inseparable entities: when you have men who no longer believe that God is in charge of human affairs, you have men attempting to take the place of God by means of the superstate. The all-provident government, which these liberals constantly invoke, is the modern-day version of Baal.

— Jesse Helms, When Free Men Shall Stand

Helms was well known for his strong Christian religious views. He played a leading role in the development of the Christian right, and was a founding member of the Moral Majority in 1979. Although a Southern Baptist from his upbringing in a strictly literalist, but hawkishly secularist, environment, when in Raleigh, Helms worshipped at the moderate Hayes Barton Baptist Church, where he had served as a deacon and Sunday school teacher before his election to the Senate.

Helms was close to fellow North Carolinian Billy Graham (whom he considered a personal hero), as well as Charles Stanley, Pat Robertson, and Jerry Falwell, whose Liberty University dedicated its Jesse Helms School of Government to Helms. Helms helped found Camp Willow Run, an interdenominational Christian summer camp, sitting on its board of directors until his death, and was a Grand Orator of the Masonic Grand Lodge of North Carolina.

Equating leftism and atheism, Helms argued that the downfall of the U.S. was due to loss of Christian faith, and often stated, "I think God is giving this country one more chance to save itself". He believed that the morality of capitalism was assured in the Bible, through the Parable of the Talents. He believed, writing in When Free Men Shall Stand, that "such utopian slogans as Peace with Honor, Minimum Wage, Racial Equality, Women's Liberation, National Health Insurance, Civil Liberty" are ploys by which to divide humanity "as sons of God".

=== Awards ===
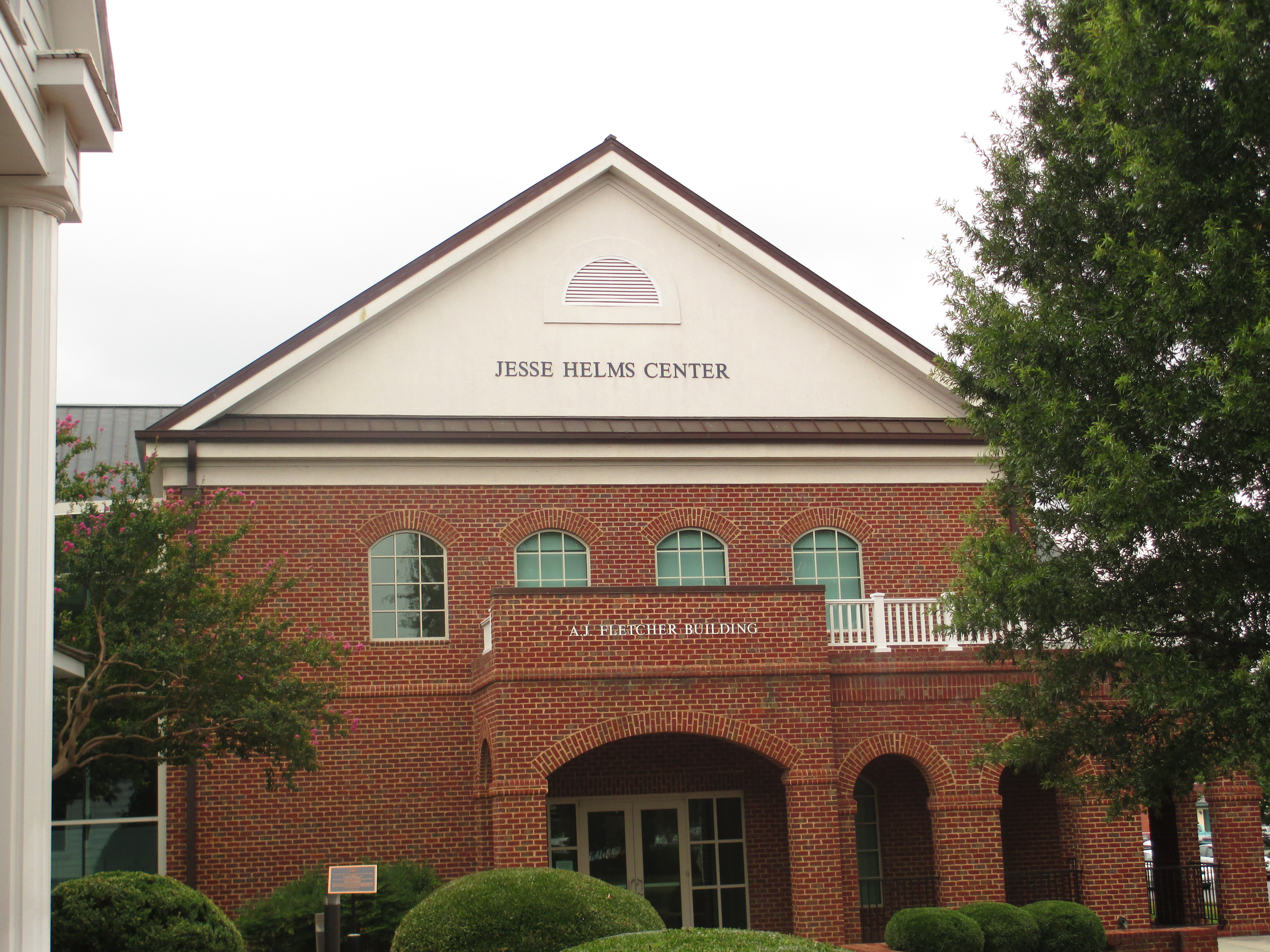
The Jesse Helms Center is located next to the Wingate Town Hall.

Helms held honorary degrees from several religious universities including Bob Jones University, Campbell University, Grove City College, and Wingate University which he attended but did not receive a degree.

- Taiwan: Order of Propitious Clouds with Grand Cordon (2002)

== Works ==
- "Saving the UN: a challenge to the next Secretary-General." Foreign Affairs 75 (1996): 2+ online
- "What Sanctions Epidemic? US Business' Curious Crusade." Foreign Affairs (1999): 2–8. in JSTOR
- "Tax-Paid Obscenity." Nova Law Review 14 (1989): 317. online
- When Free Men Shall Stand (1976); Zondervan Pub. House.
- Empire for Liberty: A Sovereign America and Her Moral Mission (2001); by National Book Network.
- Here's Where I Stand: A Memoir (2005); New York: Random House.

== Bibliography ==
- Roy, Joaquín (2000). Cuba, the United States, and the Helms-Burton Doctrine. Gainesville: University Press of Florida. ISBN 978-0-8130-1760-0.
- Shirley, Craig (January 20, 2005). Reagan's Revolution: The Untold Story of the Campaign That Started It All. Thomas Nelson. ISBN 978-0-7852-6049-3.
- Link, William A. (2008). Righteous Warrior: Jesse Helms and the Rise of Modern Conservatism. St. Martin's Press. ISBN 978-0-312-35600-2.
- Kinzer, Stephen (2006). Overthrow: America's Century of Regime Change from Hawaii to Iraq. New York: Times Books. ISBN 978-0-8050-7861-9.
- Thrift, Bryan Hardin. Conservative Bias: How Jesse Helms Pioneered the Rise of Right-Wing Media and Realigned the Republican Party (2014) excerpt

Party political offices
Preceded by John Shallcross	Republican nominee for U.S. Senator from North Carolina (Class 2); 1972, 1978, 1984, 1990, 1996	Succeeded by Elizabeth Dole
Preceded by Jim McClure	Chair of the Senate Republican Steering Committee; 1981–1985	Succeeded by Jim McClure
U.S. Senate
Preceded by B. Everett Jordan	U.S. Senator (Class 2) from North Carolina; 1973–2003; Served alongside: Sam Ervin, Robert Morgan, John P. East, James Broyhill, Terry Sanford, Lauch Faircloth, John Edwards	Succeeded by Elizabeth Dole
Preceded by Bob Dole	Ranking Member of the Senate Agriculture Committee; 1977–1981	Succeeded by Walter Dee Huddleston
Preceded by Herman Talmadge	Chair of the Senate Agriculture Committee; 1981–1987	Succeeded by Patrick Leahy
Preceded by Edward Zorinsky	Ranking Member of the Senate Agriculture Committee; 1987	Succeeded by Richard Lugar
Preceded by Richard Lugar	Ranking Member of the Senate Foreign Relations Committee; 1987–1995	Succeeded by Claiborne Pell
Preceded by Claiborne Pell	Chair of the Senate Foreign Relations Committee; 1995–2001	Succeeded by Joe Biden
Preceded by Joe Biden	Ranking Member of the Senate Foreign Relations Committee; 2001–2003	Succeeded by Richard Lugar
