= Hands (advertisement) =

1990 American political television advertisement

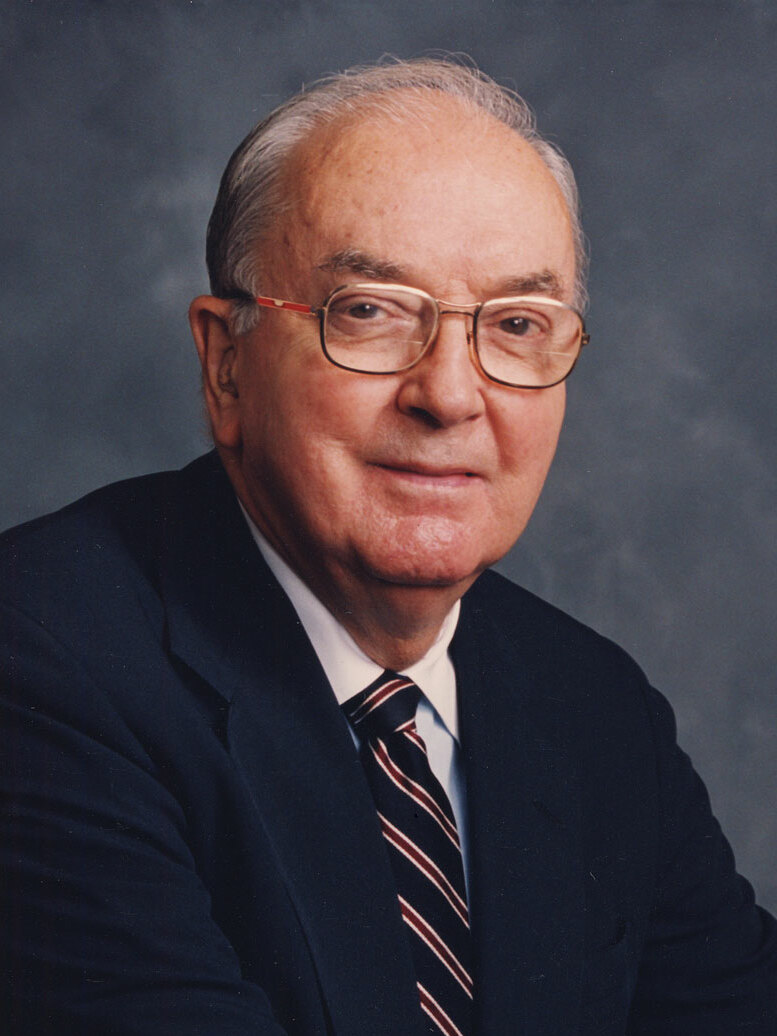
Jesse Helms, the Republican incumbent, and Harvey Gantt, the Democratic challenger.

"Hands," also known as "White Hands," was a political television commercial aired during the 1990 United States Senate election in North Carolina by the campaign of incumbent Republican Senator Jesse Helms. The ad targeted Helms's Democratic challenger, Harvey Gantt, and became one of the most controversial and widely discussed political advertisements in modern American history.

== Content and production ==
The advertisement depicts the hands of a white man in a plaid shirt reading and then crumpling a job rejection letter. A somber voiceover states: "You needed that job, and you were the best qualified. But they had to give it to a minority because of a racial quota. Is that really fair?" The ad then contrasts Helms and Gantt by claiming that Gantt supported "racial quotas" and that Helms opposed them, specifically referencing Gantt's support for the proposed Civil Rights Act of 1990, which the ad labeled as "Ted Kennedy's racial quota law."

The ad was written and produced by Republican media consultant Alex Castellanos. Carter Wrenn, a longtime North Carolina Republican strategist, was also involved in the process and later acknowledged the ad as a clear example of race-baiting.

== Political context ==
The 1990 North Carolina Senate race was closely contested. Gantt, the former mayor of Charlotte and the first African American to be a major party candidate for the U.S. Senate in North Carolina, led in polls shortly before the election. The Helms campaign’s use of the "White Hands" ad is widely credited with shifting momentum in the final days, contributing to Helms’s narrow victory.

== Reception and legacy ==
The "White Hands" ad was immediately controversial. Critics argued that it played on white resentment and racial fears, misrepresented affirmative action as a system of rigid quotas, and implied that minorities were unfairly taking jobs from more qualified white applicants. Supporters of the ad claimed it highlighted legitimate policy differences regarding affirmative action.

The advertisement is frequently cited as a classic example of negative campaigning and racial "dog whistle" politics in late 20th-century America. Its legacy continues to be discussed in analyses of political strategy, race relations, and the evolution of campaign advertising.
