= First Baptist Church–West =

Church in North Carolina, US

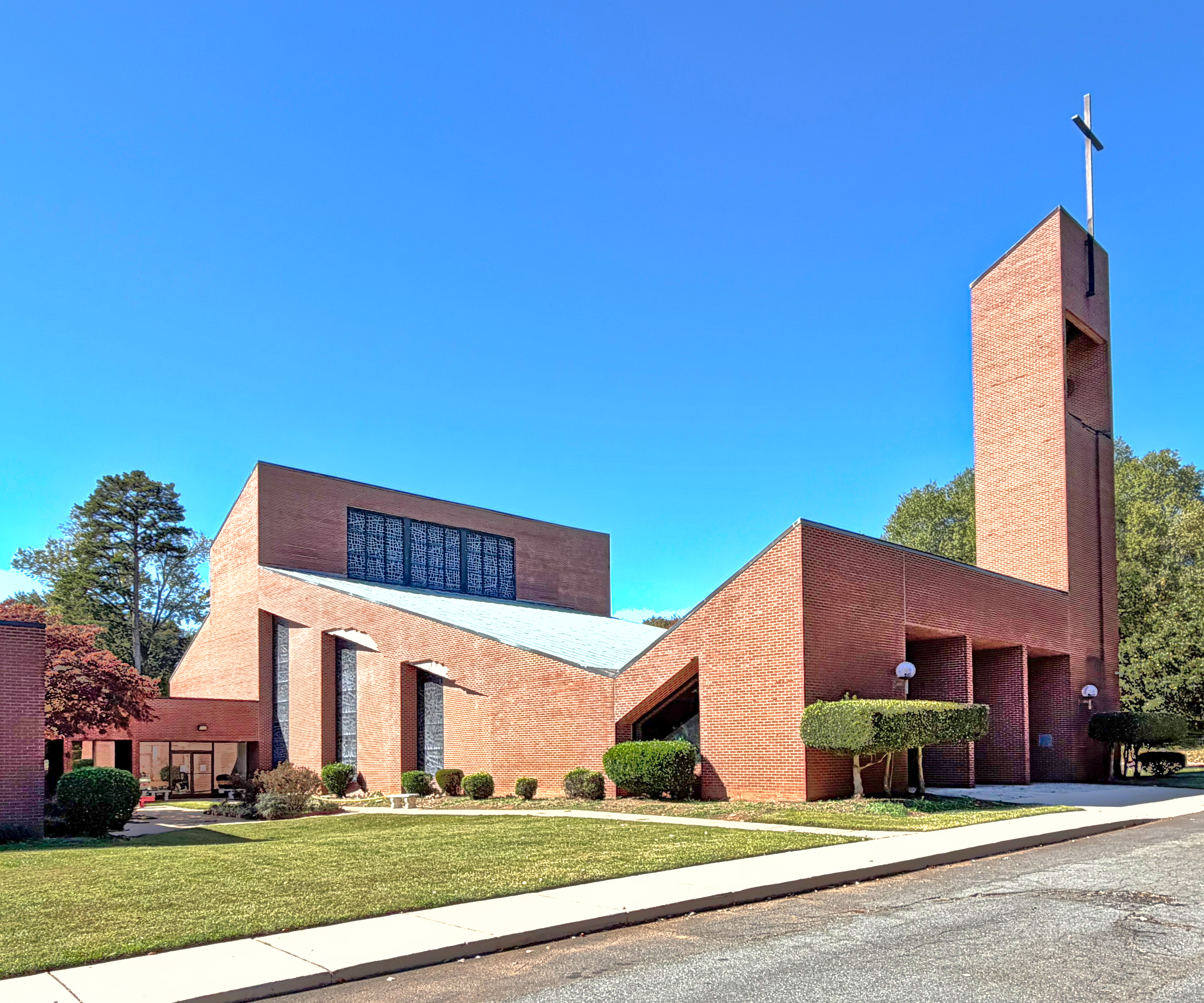
- The sanctuary and steeple of First Baptist Church–West
- First Baptist Church–West
- 35.2506°N 80.8518°W
- Address: 1801 Oaklawn Avenue, Charlotte, North Carolina, US
- Country: United States
- Denomination: Baptist
- Website: fbcwest.org

History
- Founded: 1867
- Dedicated: May 1977

Architecture
- Architect: Harvey Gantt
- Style: Modernism
- Groundbreaking: 1976
- Completed: 1977
- Construction cost: $800,000 ($4.25 million in 2025) (original sanctuary)

Specifications
- Materials: Brick

First Baptist Church–West is a church in Charlotte, North Carolina, United States. Dating to 1867, the church is Charlotte's oldest black Baptist congregation. It is known for its modernist building in the McCrorey Heights area of Charlotte. Built in 1977, the building was the first church designed by a young Harvey Gantt, an architect and future first black mayor of Charlotte from 1983 to 1987. It has been recognized with a preservation grant an initiative funded by the National Trust for Historic Preservation's African American Cultural Heritage Action Fund and the Getty Foundation.

== History ==
First Baptist Church–West (FBCW) originated in 1867. A group of formerly enslaved people gathered at the white First Baptist Church of Charlotte, where they had previously worshiped in the balcony, to discuss their church future. A group of 66 African Americans was granted approval to form a church of their own in June 1867 and the congregation was organized the next year as the First Baptist Church (for Negroes). In 1870, the congregation purchased land at 1020 South Church Street in the Third Ward of Uptown Charlotte. Construction began in 1901 and the first building on the site was completed in 1911.

During urban renewal in the 1970s, the congregation moved to the relatively affluent black neighborhood of McCrorey Heights. After this move, the word "West" was appended to the church's name. When the congregation looked for an architecture firm to design its new building, it interviewed then 33-year-old architect Harvey Gantt, a Clemson graduate who had never designed a church before. Gantt presented two designs to the building committee: a traditional red-brick building with a colonnade in the front and a contemporary design. Despite Gantt's lack of experience with religious architecture, his proposal for a modernist building won the commission. The Gantt-designed building at 1801 Oaklawn Avenue was dedicated in May 1977. Having been sold, the Church Street building was demolished the following month.

A $3.2 million ($5.45 million in 2025) family life center including a chapel, multipurpose room, classrooms and library was dedicated in 2004.

== Architecture ==
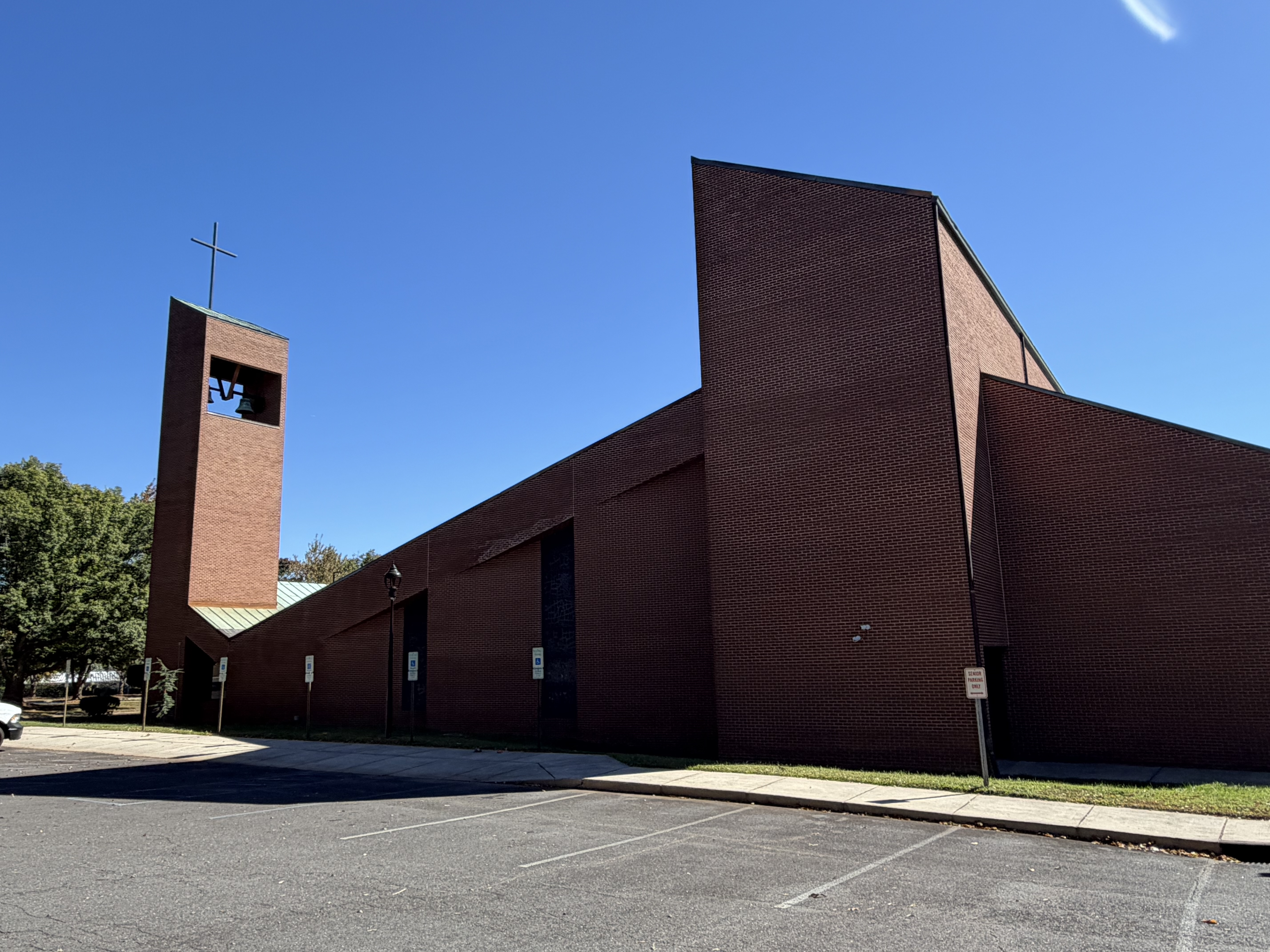
First Baptist Church–West viewed from the west

The 20,000 square feet (1,900 m^{2}) sanctuary building's exterior is brick, with clean angular lines characteristic of modernist design. The roofline inverts a traditional church profile with a roof that drops from the entrance, then climbs to a two-story section over the back of the church. The boxy and geometrical massing was characteristic of Gantt's work. Bells from Sweden were hung in the belfry. Gantt described the building as a departure from usual Baptist architecture.

The interior of the sanctuary included contemporary stained glass, exposed wooden beams and custom-designed light fixtures. The sanctuary featured near-perfect acoustics.

The original sanctuary building also included a multi-purpose room, kitchen, classrooms, choir rooms, offices and kindergarten facilities.

== Preservation ==
In 2023, FBCW was awarded $150,000 in a grant from the Conserving Black Modernism initiative of the National Trust for Historic Preservation's African American Cultural Heritage Action Fund and the Getty Foundation. The grant was for a preservation plan that would cover repairs to the sanctuary roof and the baptistry.
