= Rob Gray =

Rob Gray may refer to:

- Rob Gray (art director) (1962–2016), American art director and production designer
- Rob Gray (basketball) (born 1994), American basketball player
- Rob Gray (discus thrower) (born 1956), Canadian Olympic discus thrower
- Rob Gray (engineer), British Formula One engineer

== See also ==
- Robert Gray (disambiguation)
