= Robert Gray (North Carolina politician) =

American politician

Robert R. Gray (born c. 1855) was a teacher and state legislator in North Carolina. He was a member of the North Carolina House of Representatives and North Carolina Senate. He attended Saint Augustine College in Raleigh.

In 1883 when he was 28 years old, he represented Edgecombe County in the North Carolina Senate. He was African American. He lived in Tarboro, North Carolina.

== See also ==
- African American officeholders from the end of the Civil War until before 1900
