= 1990 United States Senate election in North Carolina =

- November 6, 1990
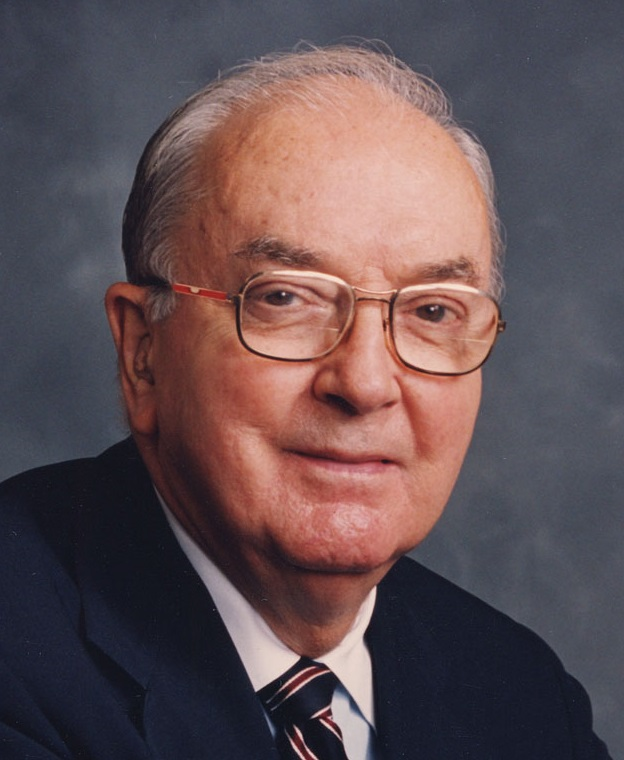

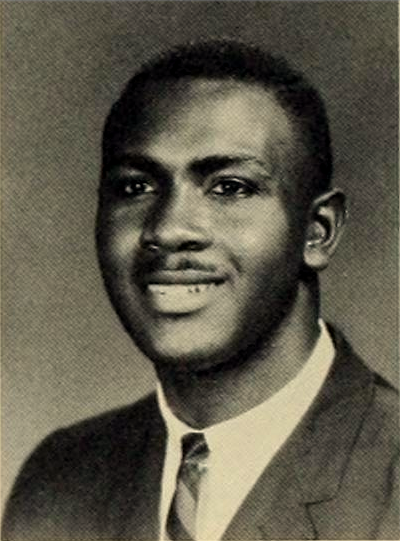
Nominee	Jesse Helms	Harvey Gantt
Party	Republican	Democratic
Popular vote	1,089,012	981,573
Percentage	52.58%	47.39%
- Helms: 50–60% 60–70% 70–80% 80–90% >90% Gantt: 50–60% 60–70% 70–80% 80–90% >90% Tie: 40–50% 50%
U.S. senator before election
Jesse Helms
Republican
Elected U.S. Senator
Jesse Helms
Republican

The North Carolina United States Senate election of 1990 was held on November 6, 1990, as part of the nationwide elections to the Senate. The general election was fought between the Republican incumbent Jesse Helms and the Democratic nominee former mayor of Charlotte Harvey Gantt. Helms won re-election to a fourth term by a slightly wider margin than the close election in 1984.

The election received renewed attention in 2020 with the release of ESPN miniseries The Last Dance, which mentioned Chicago Bulls superstar Michael Jordan refusing to endorse Gantt, who was seeking to become the first African-American to represent North Carolina - Jordan's home state - in the United States Senate. When asked to endorse Gantt, Jordan said in jest, "Republicans buy sneakers, too."

== Primaries ==
=== Republican primary ===
1990 North Carolina U.S. Senate Republican primary election
Party	Candidate	Votes	%	±%
Republican	Jesse Helms (Incumbent)	157,345	84.32%	−6.33%
Republican	L. C. Nixon	15,355	8.23%	N/A
Republican	George Wimbish	13,895	7.45%	−1.90%
Turnout		186,595		

=== Democratic primary ===
1990 North Carolina U.S. Senate Democratic primary election – First round
Party	Candidate	Votes	%	±%
Democratic	Harvey Gantt	260,179	37.52%	N/A
Democratic	Mike Easley	209,934	30.27%	N/A
Democratic	John Ingram	120,990	17.45%	−8.78%
Democratic	R. P. Thomas	82,883	11.95%	N/A
Democratic	Lloyd Gardner	11,528	1.66%	N/A
Democratic	Robert Hannan	7,982	1.15%	N/A
Turnout		693,496		

1990 North Carolina U.S. Senate Democratic primary election – Second round
Party	Candidate	Votes	%	±%
Democratic	Harvey Gantt	273,567	56.89%	+19.37%
Democratic	Mike Easley	207,283	43.11%	+12.84%
Turnout		480,850		

== General election ==
The Helms campaign against black Democratic nominee Harvey Gantt was racially charged, as he focused on messaging of black people taking jobs from white people. He ran an advertisement in which a white person was denied a job due to racial quotas. Carter Wrenn, who was involved in the ad's creation, stated that "We played the race card".

60% of white voters supported Helms while 94% of black voters supported Gantt.

=== Results ===
1990 North Carolina U.S. Senate election
Party	Candidate	Votes	%	±%
Republican	Jesse Helms (Incumbent)	1,089,012	52.58%	+0.92%
Democratic	Harvey Gantt	981,573	47.39%	−0.42%
Socialist Workers	Rich Stuart	681	0.03%	−0.08%
Turnout		2,071,266		
Republican hold				

== See also ==
- 1990 United States Senate elections

== Works cited ==
- Black, Earl; Black, Merle (2002). The Rise of Southern Republicans. Harvard University Press. ISBN 067400728X.
