= Robert Gray (footballer, born 1927) =

Scottish footballer

Personal information
- Date of birth: 18 June 1927
- Place of birth: Cambuslang, Scotland
- Date of death: 25 October 2018 (aged 91)
- Place of death: East Kilbride, Lanarkshire, Scotland
- Position: Winger

Senior career*
Years	Team	Apps	(Gls)
- Wishaw Juniors
1949–1950	Lincoln City	2	(0)
- * Club domestic league appearances and goals

Robert Gray, also known as Bobby Gray (18 June 1927 – 25 October 2018) was a Scottish professional footballer who played for Wishaw Juniors and Lincoln City as a winger.
