= Robert Gray (footballer, born 1951) =

Scottish footballer

Personal information
- Full name: Robert Henry William Gray
- Date of birth: 21 January 1951 (age 75)
- Place of birth: Aberdeen, Scotland
- Position: Goalkeeper

Senior career*
| Years | Team | Apps | (Gls) |
- Inverurie Loco Works
| 1969–1970 | Torquay United | 2 | (0) |
- Keith
- * Club domestic league appearances and goals

Robert Henry William Gray (born 21 January 1951) is a Scottish former footballer who played for Inverurie Loco Works, Torquay United and Keith, as a goalkeeper.
