= Harvey Gantt =

American architect and politician (born 1943)

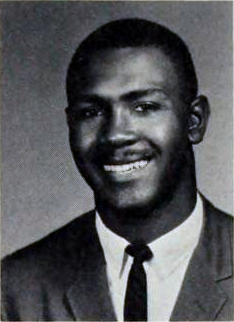
- Gantt as a Clemson student c. 1964

50th Mayor of Charlotte
- In office 1983–1987
- Preceded by: Eddie Knox
- Succeeded by: Sue Myrick

Personal details
- Born: Harvey Bernard Gantt; January 14, 1943 (age 83) Charleston, South Carolina, U.S.
- Party: Democratic
- Spouse: Lucinda Brawley
- Children: 4
- Education: Iowa State University (attended); Clemson University (BArch); Massachusetts Institute of Technology (MUP)

Harvey Bernard Gantt (born January 14, 1943) is an American architect and Democratic politician active in North Carolina. The first African-American student admitted to Clemson University after attending Iowa State University, Gantt graduated with honors in architecture, earned a master's at MIT, and established an architectural practice in Charlotte with a partner.

Gantt entered local politics, where he was elected to the city council, serving from 1974 to 1983. He was elected to two terms as the first black Mayor of Charlotte from 1983 to 1987. In 1990 and 1996, Gantt was the Democratic nominee for the U.S. Senate, losing to incumbent Republican Jesse Helms both times.

== Early life and education ==
Gantt was born in Charleston, South Carolina, to Wilhelminia and Christopher C. Gantt, a shipyard worker. He started to participate in civil rights activism in high school. In 1963, he was the first African American to be admitted to Clemson University in South Carolina. when he transferred from Iowa State University. He received a degree in architecture with honors from Clemson and a master's degree in city planning from MIT.

In 1976, despite never having designed a church before, Gantt won the commission for the First Baptist Church–West, Charlotte's oldest Black Baptist church, and designed a modernist structure.

== Career ==
=== Charlotte municipal politics ===
From 1974 until 1983, Gantt served on the Charlotte City Council. He was elected to two terms as the first African-American mayor of Charlotte, North Carolina, serving in that position from 1983 to 1987. He was defeated for a third term as mayor in 1987 by Sue Myrick. He was Charlotte's last Democratic mayor until Anthony Foxx was elected in 2009.

=== U.S. Senate elections ===
In 1990, Gantt ran for a Senate seat in North Carolina as a Democrat against the incumbent, Republican Jesse Helms. Gantt avoided the issue of race, instead attacking Helms's record on jobs, education and health care. With one and a half weeks to go, Gantt was ahead in the polls, but Helms aired a number of television commercials emphasizing Gantt's color. One, which attacked Gantt's pro-choice stance, repeatedly rewound and replayed a soundbite from Gantt, with the image changing from color to black and white, and Gantt's face appearing darker at the end.

Another advertisement, known as the White Hands ad, showed a close-up of the hands of a white person reading, then crumpling a letter, while a voice-over said "You needed that job, and you were the best qualified. But they had to give it to a minority because of a racial quota. Is that really fair?" It accused Gantt of supporting "Ted Kennedy's racial quota law". Gantt lost the election by 47% to 53%. Gantt ran against Helms again in 1996, but he lost again with 46% of the vote.

== Post-political career ==
Gantt manages a successful architectural practice, Gantt Huberman Architects, and remains active in politics. He served on the North Carolina Democratic Party Executive Council, the Democratic National Committee, and was appointed as chair of the National Capital Planning Commission in Washington, DC.

In 2009, the Afro-American Cultural Center and the City of Charlotte honored Gantt by building the Harvey B. Gantt Center for African-American Arts + Culture, recognizing his contributions to the civil rights movement and as the city's first black mayor. The four-story, 46,500-square-foot building was built for $18.6 million, and is part the Levine Center for the Arts.

In 2016, PBS Charlotte and UNC-TV featured Gantt in their online series, Biographical Conversations. In this series, Gantt recalls his life experiences, ranging from his attendance at Clemson University to his inauguration as Mayor of Charlotte, North Carolina.

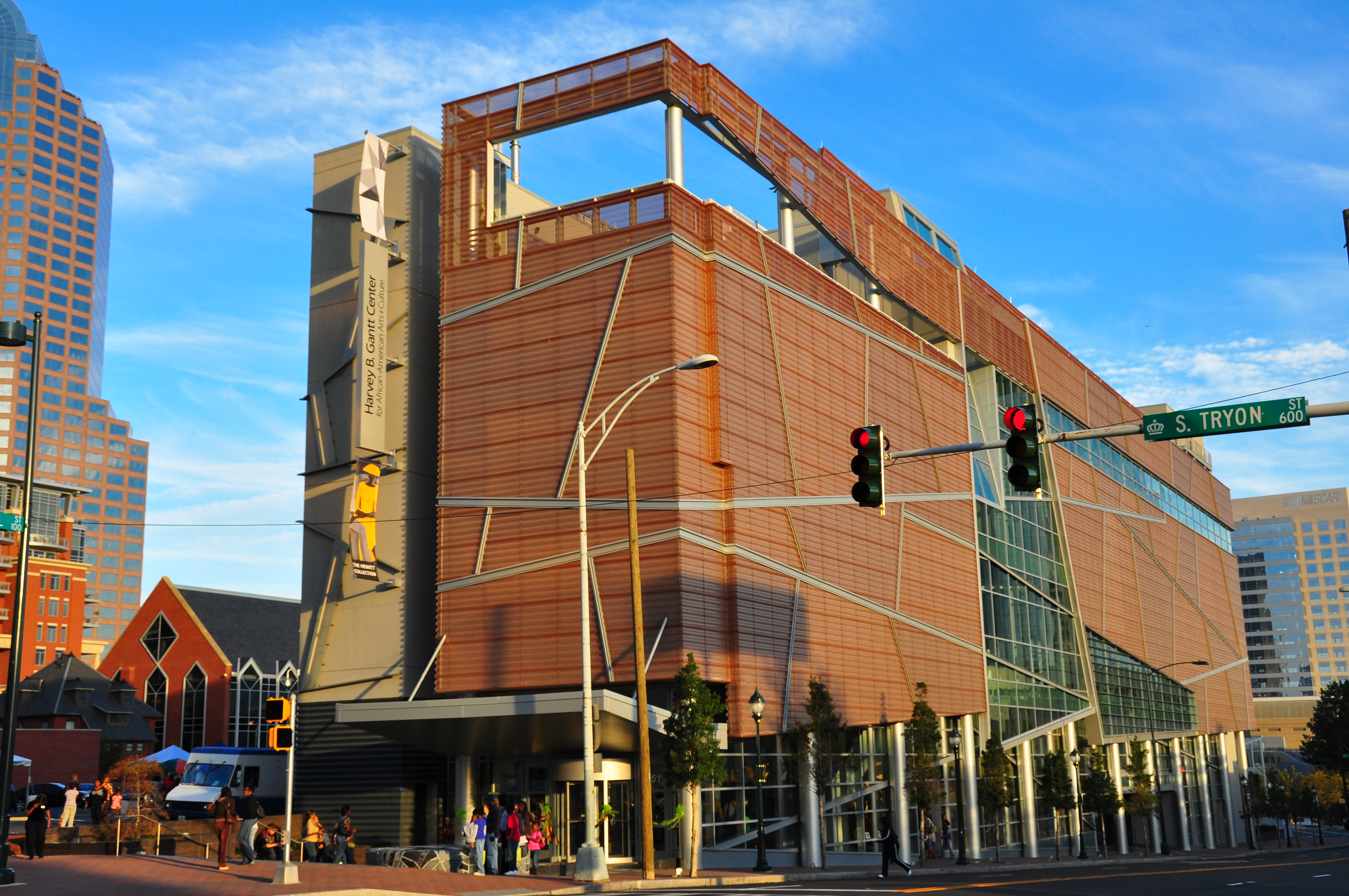
Harvey B. Gantt Center on opening day

== Personal life ==
Gantt and his wife Lucinda (Brawley) Gantt, the second black student to attend Clemson, have four children: Sonja, Erika, Angela and Adam. Their daughter, Sonja Gantt, is a former news anchor at WCNC-TV in Charlotte.

== See also ==
- African-American architects
- List of African-American United States Senate candidates
- Civil rights activists
- African Americans in politics
- List of first African-American mayors

Political offices
| Preceded by Eddie Knox | Mayor of Charlotte; 1983–1987 | Succeeded by Sue Myrick |
Party political offices
| Preceded by Jim Hunt | Democratic nominee for U.S. Senator from North Carolina (Class 2); 1990, 1996 | Succeeded by Erskine Bowles |
