= Robert A. Gray =

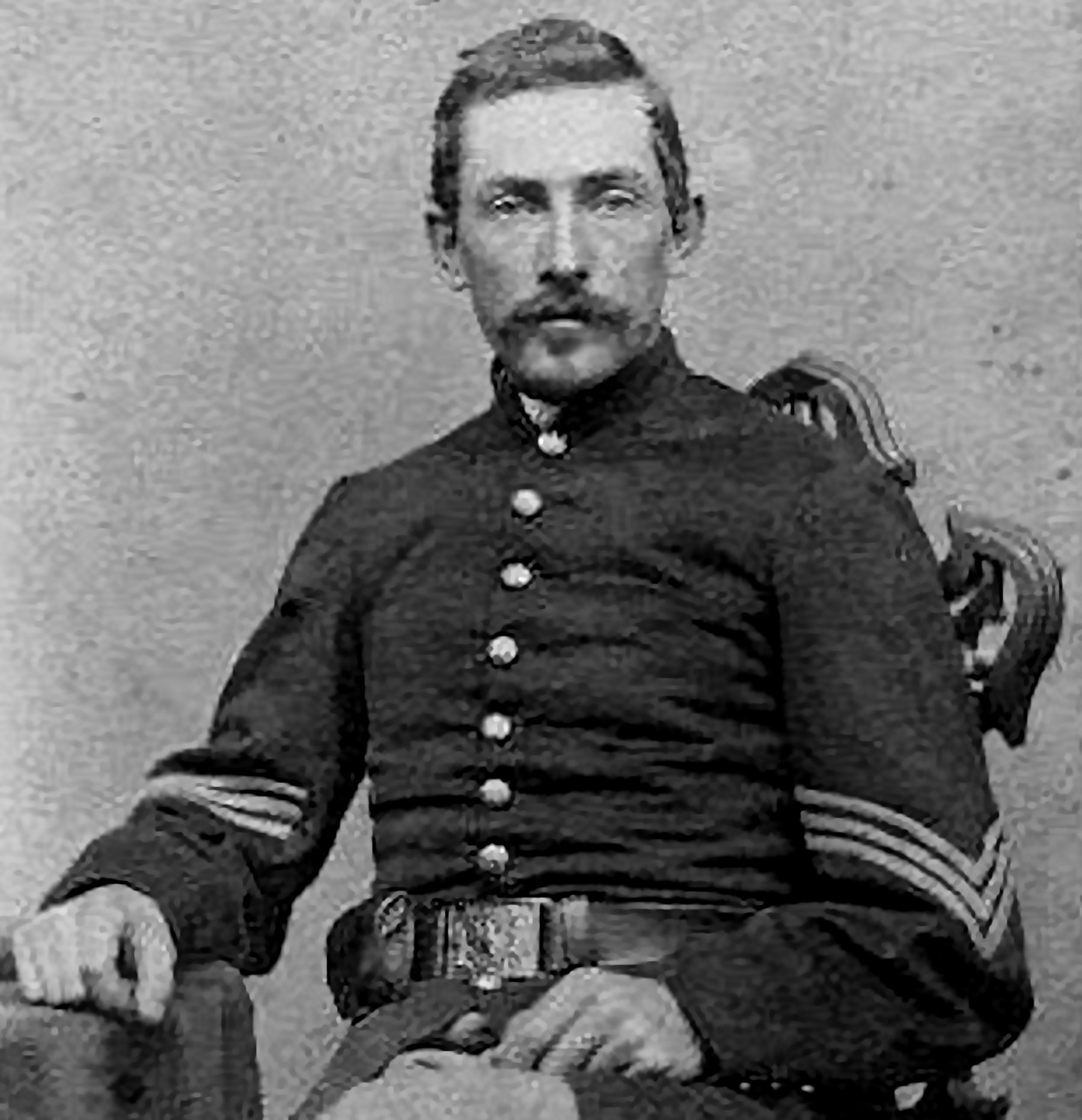
- Medal of Honor winner Robert A Gray
- Born: September 21, 1834; Philadelphia, Pennsylvania
- Died: November 22, 1906 (aged 72)
- Burial place: Groton, Connecticut
- Military career
- Allegiance: United States of America
- Branch: United States Army
- Rank: Sergeant
- Units: Company C, 21st Connecticut Volunteer Infantry Regiment
- Conflicts: American Civil War
- Awards: Medal of Honor

Robert A. Gray (September 21, 1834 - November 22, 1906) was a Union Army soldier in the American Civil War who received the U.S. military's highest decoration, the Medal of Honor.

Gray was born in Philadelphia, Pennsylvania on September 21, 1834, and entered service at Groton, Connecticut. He was awarded the Medal of Honor, for extraordinary heroism shown on May 16, 1864, while serving as a Sergeant with Company C, 21st Connecticut Infantry Regiment, at Drewry's Bluff, Virginia. His Medal of Honor was issued on July 13, 1897.

He died at the age of 72, on November 22, 1906, and was buried at the Colonel Ledyard Cemetery in Groton, Connecticut.

== Medal of Honor citation ==
The President of the United States of America, in the name of Congress, takes pleasure in presenting the Medal of Honor to Sergeant Robert A. Gray, United States Army, for extraordinary heroism on 16 May 1864, while serving with Company C, 21st Connecticut Infantry, in action at Drewry's Bluff, Virginia. While retreating with his regiment, which had been repulsed, Sergeant Gray voluntarily returned, in face of the enemy's fire, to a former position and rescued a wounded officer of his company who was unable to walk.
