= Bob Gray (priest) =

Irish Anglican priest: (born 1970)

Robert James Gray is an Irish Anglican priest: he is the current Archdeacon of Ferns, Cashel, Waterford and Lismore.

Bob Gray was born in 1970, educated at Trinity College, Dublin and ordained in 1996. After a curacy at Clooney with Strathfoyle he has been based at Ardamine since 1999. In 2004 he became Treasurer of Ferns Cathedral.
