= Robert T. Grey =

American diplomat

Ambassador Robert T. Grey, Jr., is an American diplomat involved in security and arms control.

== Life ==
He is a former U.S. representative to the Conference on Disarmament, and was also leader of the State Department United Nations (UN) Reform Team. Ambassador Grey was a senior fellow on the Council on Foreign Relations, and counselor for political affairs of the United States mission to the United Nations in New York. Ambassador Grey also served as acting deputy director of the Arms Control and Disarmament Agency as well as counselor for political affairs, U.S. mission to NATO in Brussels. He is the director of the Bipartisan Security Group, a program of the Global Security Institute.
