= 2022 United States House of Representatives elections in North Carolina =

- November 8, 2022

All 14 North Carolina seats to the United States House of Representatives
	Majority party	Minority party
Party	Republican	Democratic
Last election	8	5
Seats won	7	7
Seat change	▼1	▲2
Popular vote	1,956,906	1,795,170
Percentage	52.03%	47.73%
Swing	▲2.62%	▼2.23%

Republican hold
Democratic hold Democratic gain
Republican
50–60%
60–70%
70–80%
80–90%
Democratic
50–60%
60–70%
70–80%
80–90%

The 2022 United States House of Representatives elections in North Carolina were held on November 8, 2022, to elect U.S. representatives from the state of North Carolina, concurrent with nationwide elections to the House of Representatives and U.S. Senate (including in North Carolina), alongside legislative elections to the state house and senate. Primaries were held on May 17, 2022.

== Background ==
As a result of population growth over the preceding decade, the state's Congressional delegation increased from thirteen seats to fourteen in 2022. Republican-drawn districts adopted by the state legislature was struck down by the North Carolina Supreme Court as unconstitutional partisan gerrymander, and court-drawn maps issued in their place. Democrats flipped the redrawn 13th district from Republican control, and won the newly created 14th district, yielding an even 7–7 House delegation.

== District 1 ==
2022 North Carolina's 1st congressional district election
- November 8, 2022
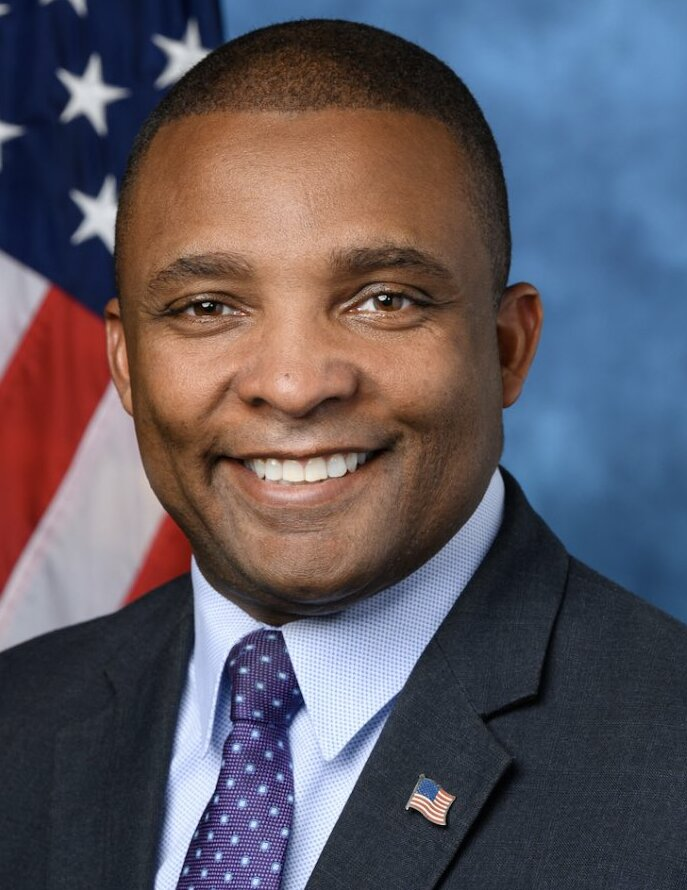

Nominee	Don Davis	Sandy Smith
Party	Democratic	Republican
Popular vote	134,996	122,780
Percentage	52.4%	47.6%
- Davis: 50–60% 60–70% 70–80% 80–90% >90% Smith: 50–60% 60–70% 70–80% 80–90% >90%
U.S. Representative before election
G. K. Butterfield
Democratic
Elected U.S. Representative
Don Davis
Democratic

The incumbent was Democrat G. K. Butterfield, who was re-elected with 54.2% of the vote in 2020.

The 1st district includes Vance, Warren, Franklin, Halifax, Northampton, Nash, Wilson, Edgecombe, Greene, Martin, Bertie, Hertford, Gates, Chowan, Perquimans, Pasquotank, Washington, and Tyrell counties. It also includes the majority of Pitt County.

=== Democratic primary ===
==== Candidates ====
===== Nominee =====
- Don Davis, state senator from the 5th district

===== Eliminated in primary =====
- Julian Bishop Sr.
- Erica Smith, former state senator from the 3rd district and candidate for U.S. Senate in 2020 and 2022
- Jason Spriggs, Henderson city councilor

===== Withdrawn =====
- James Gailliard, state representative from the 25th district (running for re-election)

===== Declined =====
- G. K. Butterfield, incumbent U.S. representative (endorsed Davis)

==== Endorsements ====
Don Davis

U.S. representatives

- G. K. Butterfield, U.S. representative for North Carolina's 1st congressional district (2004–2022)
- Jim Clyburn, U.S. representative for South Carolina's 6th congressional district (1993–present) and House Majority Whip (2007–2011, 2019–2023)

Organizations

- American Israel Public Affairs Committee
- Congressional Black Caucus PAC
- New Politics
- North Carolina AFL–CIO
- Sierra Club (post-primary)
- Vote Vets
Erica Smith

U.S. senators

- Elizabeth Warren, U.S. senator from Massachusetts (2013–present)

U.S. representatives

- Pramila Jayapal, U.S. representative for Washington's 7th congressional district (2017–present)
- Mark Pocan, U.S. representative for Wisconsin's 2nd congressional district (2013–)
- Jamie Raskin, U.S. representative for Maryland's 8th congressional district (2017–)

Organizations

- Brand New Congress
- Congressional Progressive Caucus
- Democracy for America
- J Street
- NARAL Pro-Choice America
- Planned Parenthood Action Fund
- Progressive Change Campaign Committee
- Progressive Democrats of America
- Sierra Club
- Sunrise Movement
- Working Families Party

Individuals

- Marianne Williamson, author and candidate for president of the United States in 2020

==== Polling ====
Poll source	Date(s) administered	Sample size (Note: Key: A – all adults RV – registered voters LV – likely voters V – unclear)	Margin of error	Don Davis	Erica Smith	Other	Undecided
GQR Research (D) (Note: Poll sponsored by Davis's campaign)	May 6–8, 2022	407 (LV)	± 4.9%	44%	31%	3%	22%

==== Results ====
Primary results by county: Davis: 50–60%; 60–70%; 70–80%; 80–90%; Smith: 40–50%; 50–60%; 60–70%

Democratic primary results
Party	Candidate	Votes	%
Democratic	Don Davis	42,693	63.2
Democratic	Erica D. Smith	21,012	31.1
Democratic	Jason Spriggs	2,123	3.1
Democratic	Julian Bishop Sr.	1,752	2.6
Total votes		67,580	100.0

=== Republican primary ===
==== Candidates ====
===== Nominee =====
- Sandy Smith, business owner, farmer, and nominee for this district in 2020

===== Eliminated in primary =====
- Will Aiken, police officer and businessman
- Brad Murphy, tech entrepreneur
- Ernest Reeves, retired U.S. Army captain
- Brent Roberson, businessman
- Sandy Roberson, mayor of Rocky Mount
- Billy Strickland, attorney and former chairman of the Wayne County Republican Party
- Henry Williams II, perennial candidate

==== Endorsements ====
Sandy Roberson

State legislators

- Tim Moore, speaker of the North Carolina House of Representatives
Sandy Smith

U.S. executive branch officials

- Donald Trump, 45th president of the United States (2017–2021)

Organizations

- FreedomWorks for America (post-primary)

==== Results ====
Primary results by county: Smith: 20–30%; 30–40%; 40–50%; S. Roberson: 20–30%; 30–40%; B. Roberson: 20–30%; 30–40%; 50–60%

Republican primary results
Party	Candidate	Votes	%
Republican	Sandy Smith	13,621	31.4
Republican	Sandy Roberson	11,603	26.7
Republican	Billy Strickland	6,050	13.9
Republican	Brent Roberson	5,992	13.8
Republican	Brad Murphy	4,128	9.5
Republican	Will Aiken	1,285	3.0
Republican	Ernest Reeves	523	1.2
Republican	Henry Williams II	202	0.5
Total votes		43,404	100.0

=== General election ===
==== Predictions ====
Source	Ranking	As of
The Cook Political Report	Likely D	October 25, 2022
Inside Elections	Likely D	October 21, 2022
Sabato's Crystal Ball	Lean D	October 12, 2022
Politico	Likely D	May 23, 2022
RCP	Tossup	September 29, 2022
Fox News	Lean D	September 20, 2022
DDHQ	Lean D	October 18, 2022
538	Solid D	October 26, 2022
The Economist	Likely D	September 28, 2022

==== Polling ====
Poll source	Date(s) administered	Sample size	Margin of error	Don Davis (D)	Sandy Smith (R)	Undecided
GQR Research (D)	October 10–13, 2022	402 (LV)	–	54%	39%	7%
RMG Research	June 4–6, 2022	500 (LV)	± 4.5%	45%	39%	16%

Hypothetical polling

Generic Democrat vs. generic Republican

Poll source	Date(s) administered	Sample size	Margin of error	Generic Democrat	Generic Republican	Undecided
GQR Research (D)	October 10–13, 2022	402 (LV)	–	52%	43%	5%

==== Results ====
2022 North Carolina's 1st congressional district election
Party	Candidate	Votes	%
Democratic	Don Davis	134,996	52.4
Republican	Sandy Smith	122,780	47.6
Total votes		257,776	100.0
Democratic hold			

== District 2 ==
2022 North Carolina's 2nd congressional district election
- November 8, 2022
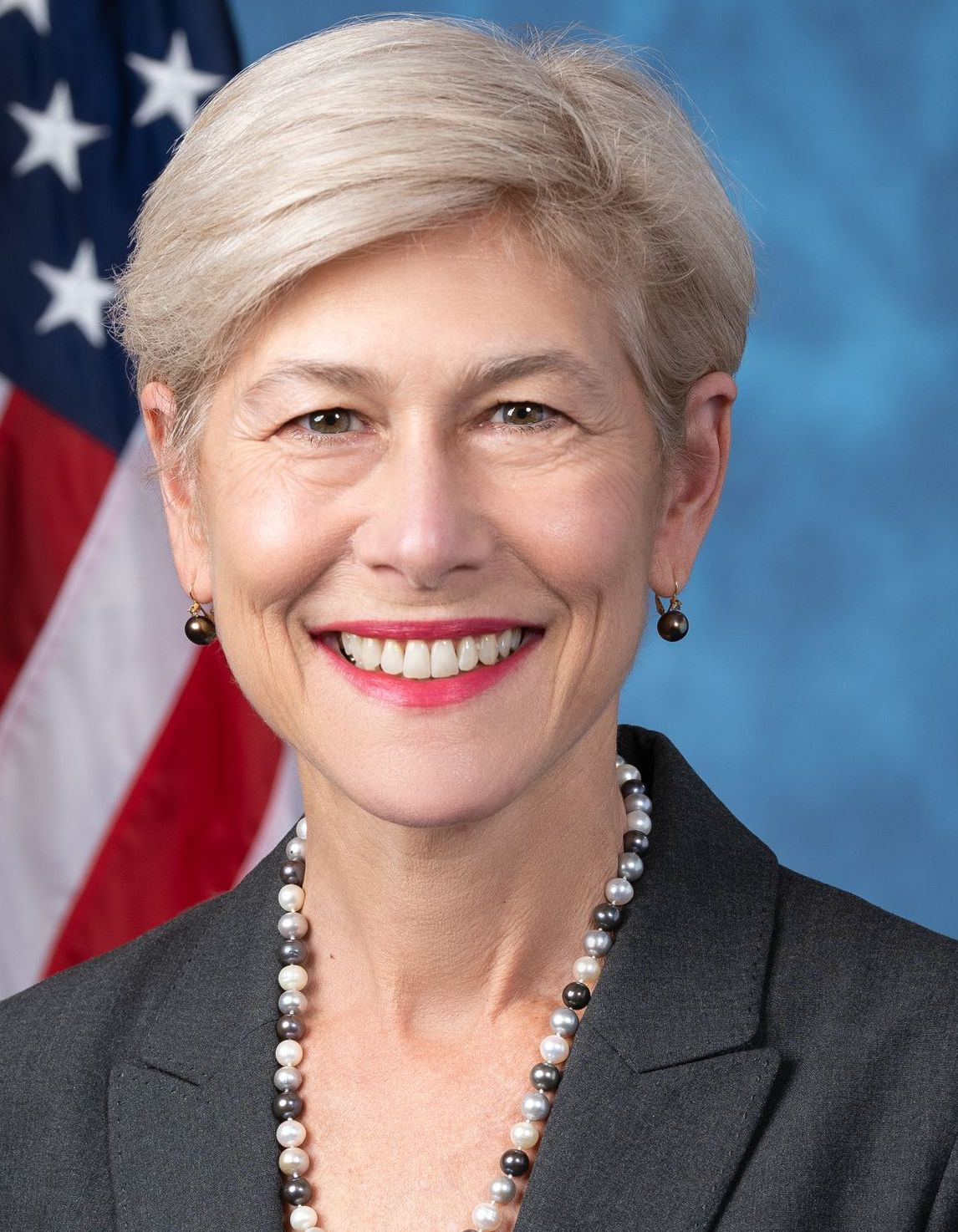

Nominee	Deborah Ross	Christine Villaverde
Party	Democratic	Republican
Popular vote	190,714	104,155
Percentage	64.7%	35.3%
- Precinct results Ross: 50–60% 60–70% 70–80% 80–90% Villaverde: 50–60% 60–70%
U.S. Representative before election
Deborah Ross
Democratic
Elected U.S. Representative
Deborah Ross
Democratic

The incumbent was Democrat Deborah Ross, who was elected with 63.0% of the vote in 2020.

The 2nd district includes most of Wake County, including the state capital of Raleigh and surrounding towns such as Apex and Cary.

=== Democratic primary ===
==== Candidates ====
===== Nominee =====
- Deborah Ross, incumbent U.S. representative

=== Republican primary ===
==== Candidates ====
===== Nominee =====
- Christine Villaverde, disaster response consultant and former police officer

===== Eliminated in primary =====
- Max Ganorkar, stay-at-home dad
- Adina Safta, realtor

==== Results ====
Republican primary results
Party	Candidate	Votes	%
Republican	Christine Villaverde	19,650	55.1
Republican	Max Ganorkar	9,133	25.6
Republican	Adina Safta	6,872	19.3
Total votes		35,655	100.0

=== General election ===
==== Endorsements ====
Deborah Ross (D)

Labor unions

- AFL-CIO

Organizations

- Equality North Carolina
- Feminist Majority PAC
- Sierra Club

==== Predictions ====
Source	Ranking	As of
The Cook Political Report	Solid D	February 23, 2022
Inside Elections	Solid D	March 18, 2022
Sabato's Crystal Ball	Safe D	March 2, 2022
Politico	Solid D	April 5, 2022
RCP	Safe D	June 9, 2022
Fox News	Solid D	July 11, 2022
DDHQ	Solid D	July 20, 2022
538	Solid D	June 30, 2022
The Economist	Safe D	September 28, 2022

==== Results ====
2022 North Carolina's 2nd congressional district election
Party	Candidate	Votes	%
Democratic	Deborah Ross (incumbent)	190,714	64.7
Republican	Christine Villaverde	104,155	35.3
Total votes		294,869	100.0
Democratic hold			

== District 3 ==
2022 North Carolina's 3rd congressional district election
- November 8, 2022
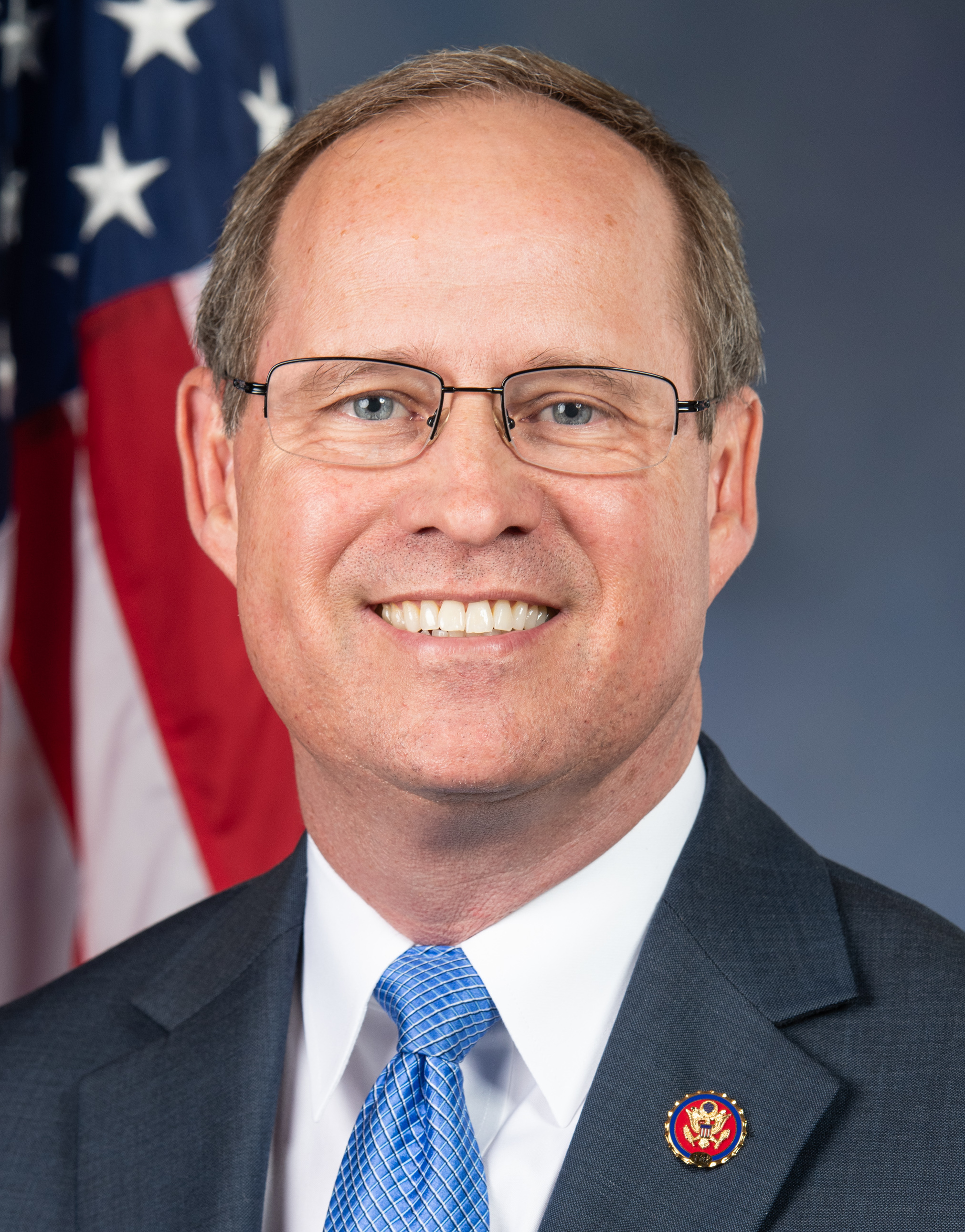

Nominee	Greg Murphy	Barbara Gaskins
Party	Republican	Democratic
Popular vote	166,520	82,378
Percentage	66.9%	33.1%
- Murphy: 50–60% 60–70% 70–80% 80–90% >90% Gaskins: 50–60% 60–70% 70–80% 80–90% >90% Tie: 50%
U.S. Representative before election
Greg Murphy
Republican
Elected U.S. Representative
Greg Murphy
Republican

The incumbent was Republican Greg Murphy, who was re-elected with 63.4% of the vote in 2020.

The 3rd district includes Beaufort, Camden, Carteret, Craven, Currituck, Dare, Hyde, Jones, Lenoir, Pamlico, and Sampson counties, as well as portions of Pitt and Wayne counties.

=== Republican primary ===
==== Candidates ====
===== Nominee =====
- Greg Murphy, incumbent U.S. representative

===== Eliminated in primary =====
- Tony Cowden, small business owner
- Eric Earhart
- Brian Michael Friend
- George Papastrat, business owner

==== Results ====
Republican primary results
Party	Candidate	Votes	%
Republican	Greg Murphy (incumbent)	50,123	75.7
Republican	Tony Cowden	9,332	14.1
Republican	Eric Earhart	3,274	4.9
Republican	George Papastrat	1,789	2.7
Republican	Brian Michael Friend	1,698	2.6
Total votes		66,216	100.0

==== Endorsements ====
Greg Murphy

Executive branch officials

- Donald Trump, 45th president of the United States (2017–2021)

Organizations

- National Rifle Association-Political Victory Fund

=== Democratic primary ===
==== Candidates ====
===== Nominee =====
- Barbara Gaskins, nonprofit founder

===== Eliminated in primary =====
- Joe Swartz, U.S. Army veteran

==== Results ====
Democratic primary results
Party	Candidate	Votes	%
Democratic	Barbara Gaskins	23,051	80.8
Democratic	Joe Swartz	5,495	19.2
Total votes		28,546	100.0

=== General election ===
==== Endorsements ====
Barbara Gaskins (D)

Labor unions

- AFL-CIO

==== Predictions ====
Source	Ranking	As of
The Cook Political Report	Solid R	February 23, 2022
Inside Elections	Solid R	March 18, 2022
Sabato's Crystal Ball	Safe R	March 2, 2022
Politico	Solid R	April 5, 2022
RCP	Safe R	June 9, 2022
Fox News	Solid R	July 11, 2022
DDHQ	Solid R	July 20, 2022
538	Solid R	June 30, 2022
The Economist	Safe R	September 28, 2022

==== Results ====
2022 North Carolina's 3rd congressional district election
Party	Candidate	Votes	%
Republican	Greg Murphy (incumbent)	166,520	66.9
Democratic	Barbara Gaskins	82,378	33.1
Total votes		248,898	100.0
Republican hold			

== District 4 ==
2022 North Carolina's 4th congressional district election
- November 8, 2022
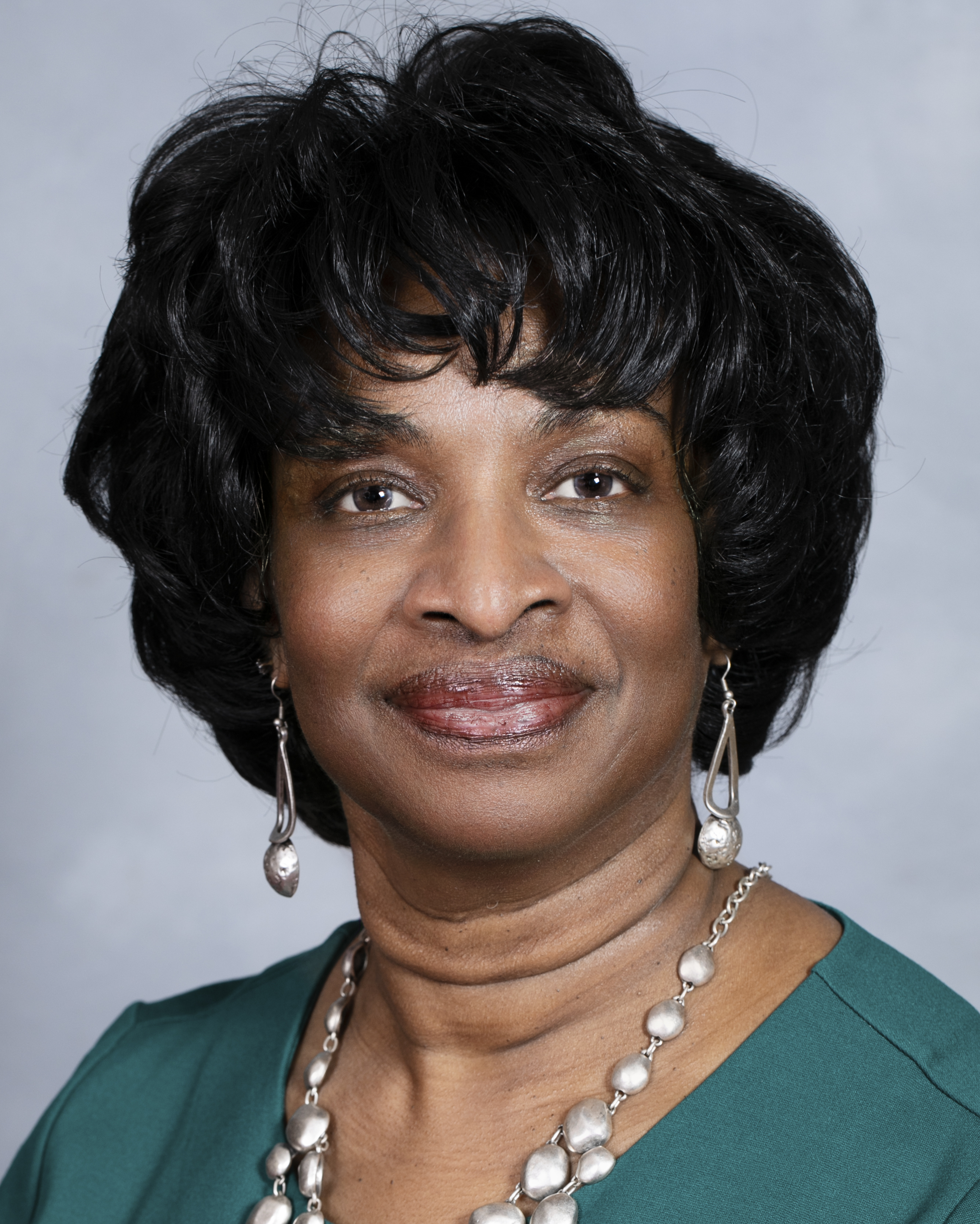

Nominee	Valerie Foushee	Courtney Geels
Party	Democratic	Republican
Popular vote	194,983	96,442
Percentage	66.9%	33.1%
- Foushee: 50–60% 60–70% 70–80% 80–90% >90% Geels: 50–60% 60–70% 70–80% 80–90%
U.S. Representative before election
David Price
Democratic
Elected U.S. Representative
Valerie Foushee
Democratic

The incumbent was Democrat David Price, who was re-elected with 67.3% of the vote in 2020. On October 18, 2021, he announced his retirement.

The 4th district includes Durham, Orange, Alamance, Granville, and Person counties, as well as a small section of Caswell County.

=== Democratic primary ===
==== Candidates ====
===== Nominee =====
- Valerie Foushee, state senator (since 2013)

===== Eliminated in primary =====
- Clay Aiken, American Idol runner-up, activist, and nominee for NC-02 in 2014
- Nida Allam, Durham County commissioner (since 2020)
- Crystal Cavalier
- Matt Grooms
- Stephen Valentine
- Ashley Ward, Duke University senior policy associate
- Richard Watkins III, scientist and candidate for NC-04 in 2018

===== Withdrawn =====
- Wiley Nickel, state senator (since 2019) (running in North Carolina's 13th congressional district)

===== Declined =====
- Zack Hawkins, state representative (since 2019)
- Jessica Holmes, former Wake County commissioner and nominee for Commissioner of Labor in 2020
- Matt Hughes, Hillsborough town commissioner
- Floyd McKissick Jr., former state senator (2007–2020)
- Graig Meyer, state representative (since 2013)
- Natalie Murdock, state senator (since 2020)
- David Price, incumbent U.S. representative
- Mike Woodward, state senator (since 2013)

==== Endorsements ====
Clay Aiken

Individuals

- Dee Snider, singer, songwriter, radio personality, and actor

Organizations

- Equality PAC
Nida Allam

U.S. senators

- Bernie Sanders, U.S. senator from Vermont (2007–present)
- Elizabeth Warren, U.S. senator from Massachusetts (2013–present)

U.S. representatives

- Pramila Jayapal, U.S. representative from Washington's 7th congressional district (2017–present)
- Raja Krishnamoorthi, U.S. representative from Illinois's 8th congressional district (2017–present)
- Alexandria Ocasio-Cortez, U.S. representative from New York's 14th congressional district (2019–present)
- Ilhan Omar, U.S. representative from Minnesota's 5th congressional district (2019–present)
- Rashida Tlaib, U.S. representative from Michigan's 13th congressional district (2019–present)

State officials

- Keith Ellison, attorney general of Minnesota (2019–present) and former U.S. representative from Minnesota's 5th congressional district (2007–2019)

State legislators

- Marcia Morey, state representative (since 2017) (previously endorsed Foushee)

Individuals

- Don Cheadle, actor

Organizations

- AAPI Victory Fund
- Brand New Congress
- Democracy for America
- End Citizens United
- North Carolina Democratic Party Progressive Caucus
- Peace Action
- Sunrise Movement
- Working Families Party

Labor unions

- CWA

Newspapers and publications

- Indy Week
- Raleigh News & Observer
Valerie Foushee

U.S. representatives

- G. K. Butterfield, U.S. representative from North Carolina's 1st congressional district (2004–present)

State officials

- Josh Stein, North Carolina attorney general (2017–present)

State legislators

- Graig Meyer, state representative (since 2013)
- Mickey Michaux, former state senator (2020) and former state representative (1973–1977; 1985–2019)
- ~~Marcia Morey, state representative (since 2017)~~ (switched endorsement to Allam)
- Natalie Murdock, state senator (since 2020)
- Sam Searcy, former state senator (2019–2020)
- Mike Woodard, state senator (since 2013)

Newspapers

- Indy Week (post-primary)

Organizations

- AIPAC
- Congressional Black Caucus PAC
- Democratic Majority for Israel
- EMILY's List
- Equality North Carolina
- Giffords (post-primary)
- League of Conservation Voters Action Fund
- NARAL Pro-Choice America (post-primary)
- Sierra Club

Labor unions

- North Carolina AFL–CIO

==== Polling ====
Poll source	Date(s) administered	Sample size	Margin of error	Clay Aiken	Nida Allam	Valerie Foushee	Other	Undecided
Impact Research (D) (Note: Poll sponsored by EMILY's List, which supports Foushee)	April 25–28, 2022	425 (LV)	± 4.8%	10%	16%	35%	8%	30%

==== Results ====
Primary results by county: Foushee: 40–50%; 50–60%; 60–70%; Allam: 40–50%

Democratic primary results
Party	Candidate	Votes	%
Democratic	Valerie Foushee	40,806	46.07
Democratic	Nida Allam	32,731	36.95
Democratic	Clay Aiken	6,529	7.37
Democratic	Ashley Ward	4,767	5.38
Democratic	Richard Watkins III	1,155	1.30
Democratic	Crystal Cavalier	1,116	1.26
Democratic	Stephen Valentine	1,023	1.55
Democratic	Matt Grooms	435	0.49
Total votes		88,562	100.0

=== Republican primary ===
==== Candidates ====
===== Nominee =====
- Courtney Geels, healthcare worker

===== Eliminated in primary =====
- Robert Thomas

==== Endorsements ====
Courtney Geels

Organizations

- Maggie's List

==== Results ====
Republican primary results
Party	Candidate	Votes	%
Republican	Courtney Geels	19,645	64.5
Republican	Robert Thomas	10,793	35.5
Total votes		30,438	100.0

=== General election ===
==== Predictions ====
Source	Ranking	As of
The Cook Political Report	Solid D	February 23, 2022
Inside Elections	Solid D	March 18, 2022
Sabato's Crystal Ball	Safe D	March 2, 2022
Politico	Solid D	April 5, 2022
RCP	Safe D	June 9, 2022
Fox News	Solid D	July 11, 2022
DDHQ	Solid D	July 20, 2022
538	Solid D	June 30, 2022
The Economist	Safe D	September 28, 2022

==== Results ====
2022 North Carolina's 4th congressional district election
Party	Candidate	Votes	%
Democratic	Valerie Foushee	194,983	66.9
Republican	Courtney Geels	96,442	33.1
Total votes		291,425	100.0
Democratic hold			

== District 5 ==
2022 North Carolina's 5th congressional district election
- November 8, 2022
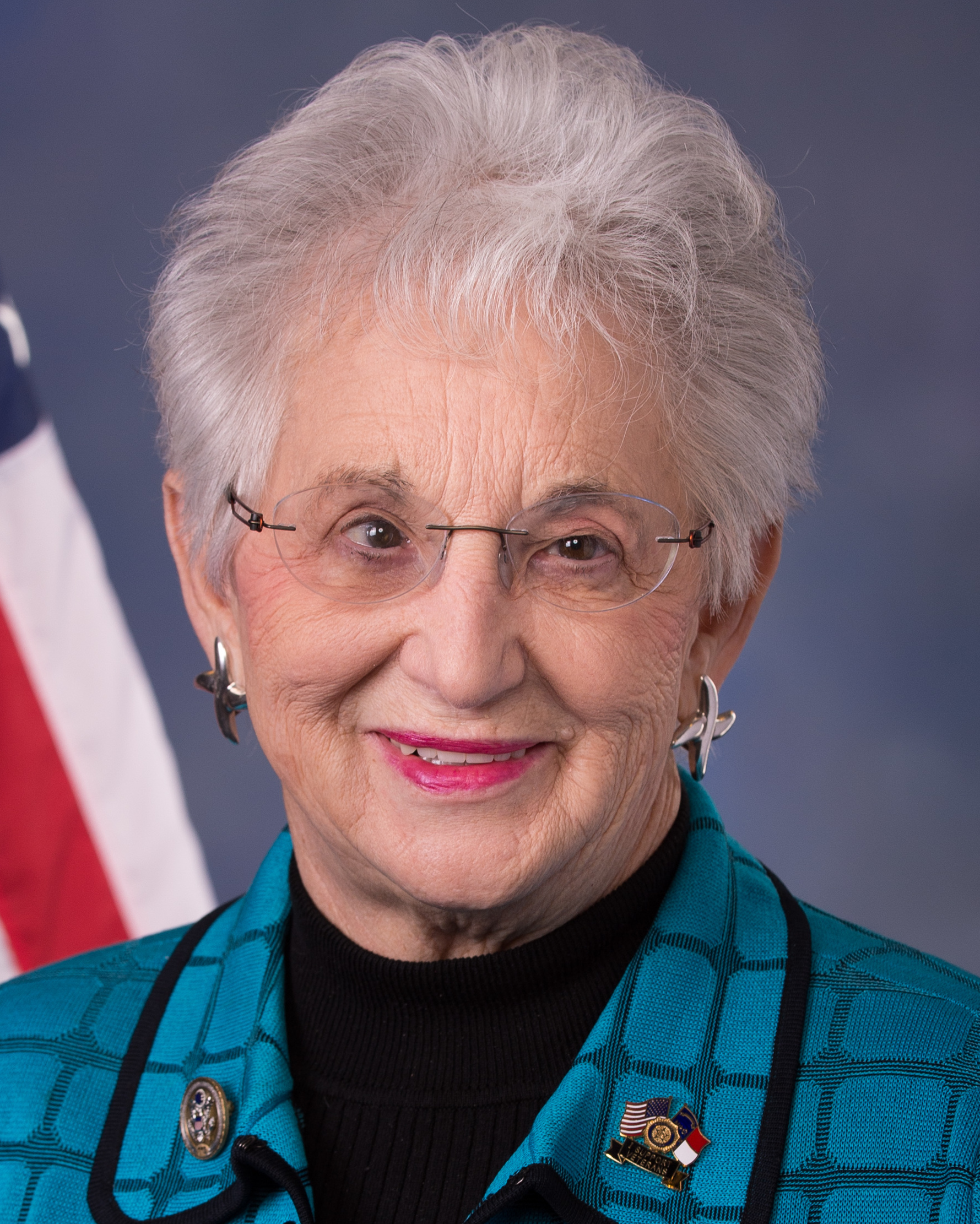

Nominee	Virginia Foxx	Kyle Parrish
Party	Republican	Democratic
Popular vote	175,279	102,269
Percentage	63.15%	36.85%
- Foxx: 50–60% 60–70% 70–80% 80–90% >90% Parrish: 50–60% 60–70% 70–80% 80–90% >90%
U.S. Representative before election
Virginia Foxx
Republican
Elected U.S. Representative
Virginia Foxx
Republican

The incumbent was Republican Virginia Foxx, who was re-elected with 66.9% of the vote in 2020.

The 5th district includes Alleghany, Ashe, Avery, Davie, Mitchell, Stokes, Surry, Watauga, Wilkes, and Yadkin counties. It also includes portions of Caldwell and Forsyth counties.

=== Republican primary ===
==== Candidates ====
===== Nominee =====
- Virginia Foxx, incumbent U.S. representative

===== Eliminated in primary =====
- Michael Ackerman, former CCSO deputy

==== Endorsements ====
Virginia Foxx

Executive branch officials

- Donald Trump, 45th president of the United States (2017–2021)

Organizations

- Maggie's List
- National Rifle Association-Political Victory Fund

==== Results ====
Republican primary results
Party	Candidate	Votes	%
Republican	Virginia Foxx (incumbent)	61,680	76.6
Republican	Michael Ackerman	18,868	23.4
Total votes		80,548	100.0

=== Democratic primary ===
==== Candidates ====
===== Nominee =====
- Kyle Parrish, IT worker

=== General election ===
==== Endorsements ====
Kyle Parrish (D)

Labor unions

- AFL-CIO

==== Predictions ====
Source	Ranking	As of
The Cook Political Report	Solid R	February 23, 2022
Inside Elections	Solid R	March 18, 2022
Sabato's Crystal Ball	Safe R	March 2, 2022
Politico	Solid R	April 5, 2022
RCP	Safe R	June 9, 2022
Fox News	Solid R	July 11, 2022
DDHQ	Solid R	July 20, 2022
538	Solid R	June 30, 2022
The Economist	Safe R	September 28, 2022

==== Results ====
2022 North Carolina's 5th congressional district election
Party	Candidate	Votes	%
Republican	Virginia Foxx (incumbent)	175,279	63.1
Democratic	Kyle Parrish	102,269	36.9
Total votes		277,548	100.0
Republican hold			

== District 6 ==
2022 North Carolina's 6th congressional district election
- November 8, 2022
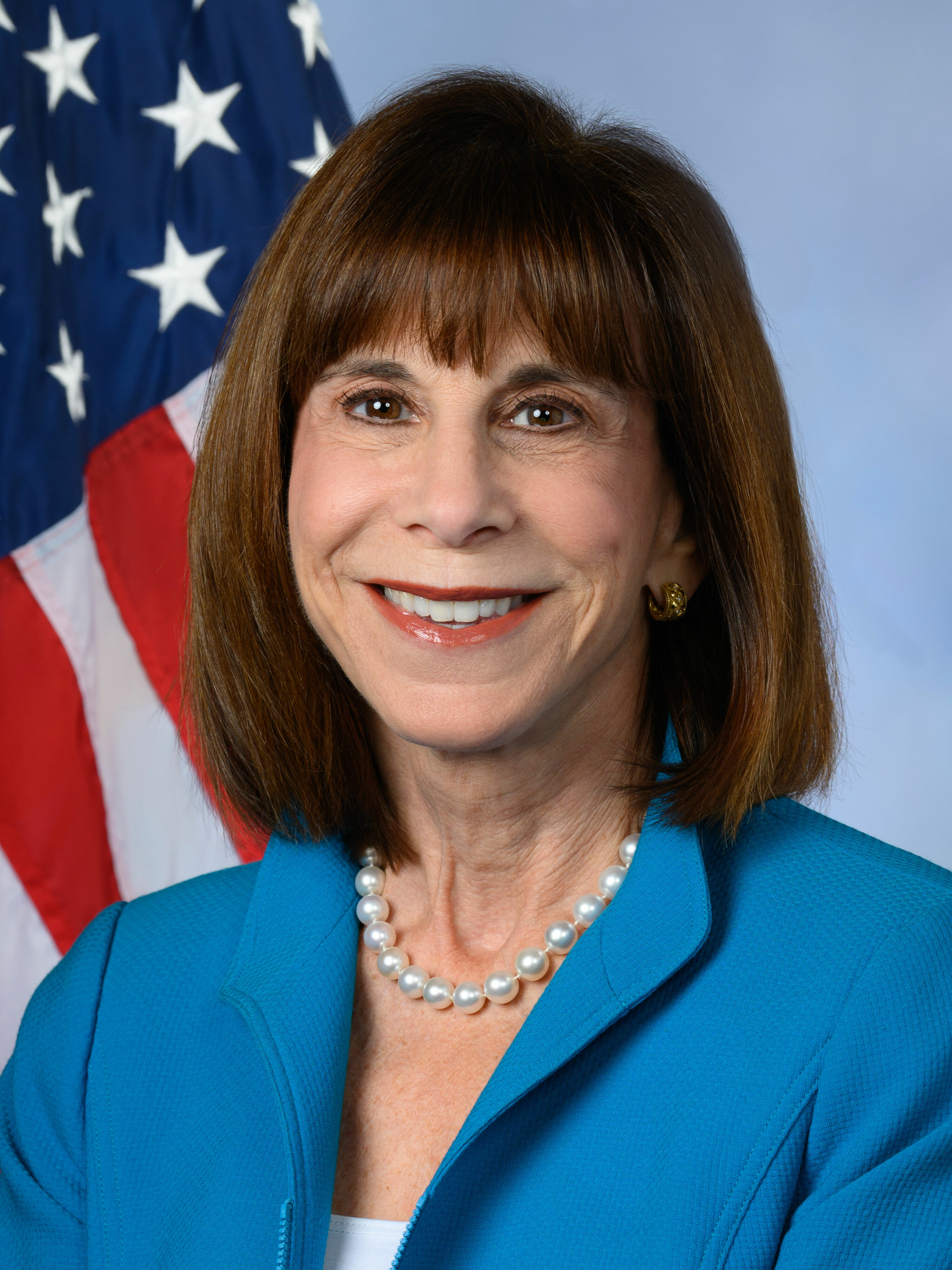

Nominee	Kathy Manning	Christian Castelli
Party	Democratic	Republican
Popular vote	139,553	116,635
Percentage	53.9%	45.0%
- Manning: 40–50% 50–60% 60–70% 70–80% 80–90% >90% Castelli: 40–50% 50–60% 60–70% 70–80% 80–90%
U.S. Representative before election
Kathy Manning
Democratic
Elected U.S. Representative
Kathy Manning
Democratic

The incumbent was Democrat Kathy Manning, who was elected with 62.3% of the vote in 2020. On November 8, 2022, Manning won re-election to her house seat against Republican Christian Castelli by a vote of 139,553 (54%) to 116,635 (45%).

=== Democratic primary ===
==== Candidates ====
===== Nominee =====
- Kathy Manning, incumbent U.S. representative

=== Republican primary ===
==== Candidates ====
===== Nominee =====
- Christian Castelli, Army veteran

===== Eliminated in primary =====
- Gerry Austin, former police officer
- Marvin Boguslawski
- Mary Ann Contogiannis
- Lee Haywood, nominee for this district in 2020
- Laura Pichardo
- Bill Schuch, former police officer

==== Endorsements ====
Lee Haywood

Individuals

- Mark Robinson, lieutenant governor of North Carolina

==== Results ====
Primary results by county: Castelli: 30–40%; 40–50%

Republican primary results
Party	Candidate	Votes	%
Republican	Christian Castelli	15,450	36.2
Republican	Lee Haywood	14,390	33.7
Republican	Mary Ann Contogiannis	5,211	12.2
Republican	Gerry Austin	2,568	6.0
Republican	Laura Pichardo	1,889	4.4
Republican	Marvin Boguslawski	1,716	4.0
Republican	Bill Schuch	1,452	3.4
Total votes		42,676	100.0

=== Independents and third parties ===
==== Candidates ====
===== Declared =====
- Thomas Watercott (Libertarian)

=== General election ===
==== Endorsements ====
Kathy Manning (D)

Labor unions

- AFL-CIO

Organizations

- American Israel Public Affairs Committee
- End Citizens United
- Feminist Majority PAC
- League of Conservation Voters Action Fund
- NARAL Pro-Choice America
- Pro-Israel America
- Sierra Club

==== Predictions ====
Source	Ranking	As of
The Cook Political Report	Likely D	February 23, 2022
Inside Elections	Solid D	August 25, 2022
Sabato's Crystal Ball	Likely D	March 2, 2022
Politico	Lean D	April 5, 2022
RCP	Likely D	June 9, 2022
Fox News	Likely D	August 22, 2022
DDHQ	Likely D	November 8, 2022
538	Solid D	August 2, 2022
The Economist	Likely D	September 28, 2022

==== Polling ====
Poll source	Date(s) administered	Sample size	Margin of error	Kathy Manning (D)	Christian Castelli (R)	Undecided
RMG Research	June 4–6, 2022	500 (LV)	± 4.5%	48%	39%	12%

==== Results ====
2022 North Carolina's 6th congressional district election
Party	Candidate	Votes	%
Democratic	Kathy Manning (incumbent)	139,553	53.9
Republican	Christian Castelli	116,635	45.0
Libertarian	Thomas Watercott	2,810	1.1
Total votes		258,998	100.0
Democratic hold			

== District 7 ==
2022 North Carolina's 7th congressional district election
- November 8, 2022
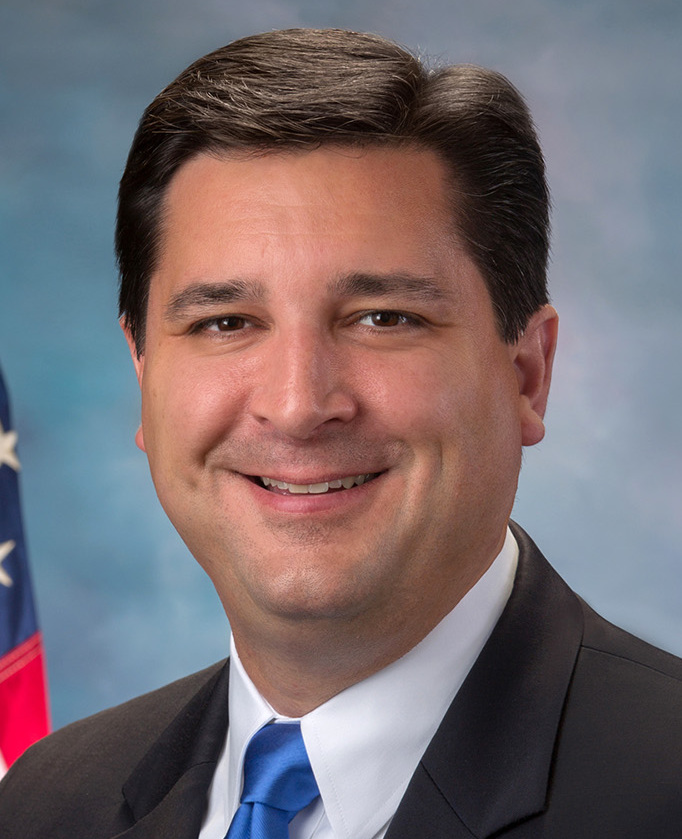

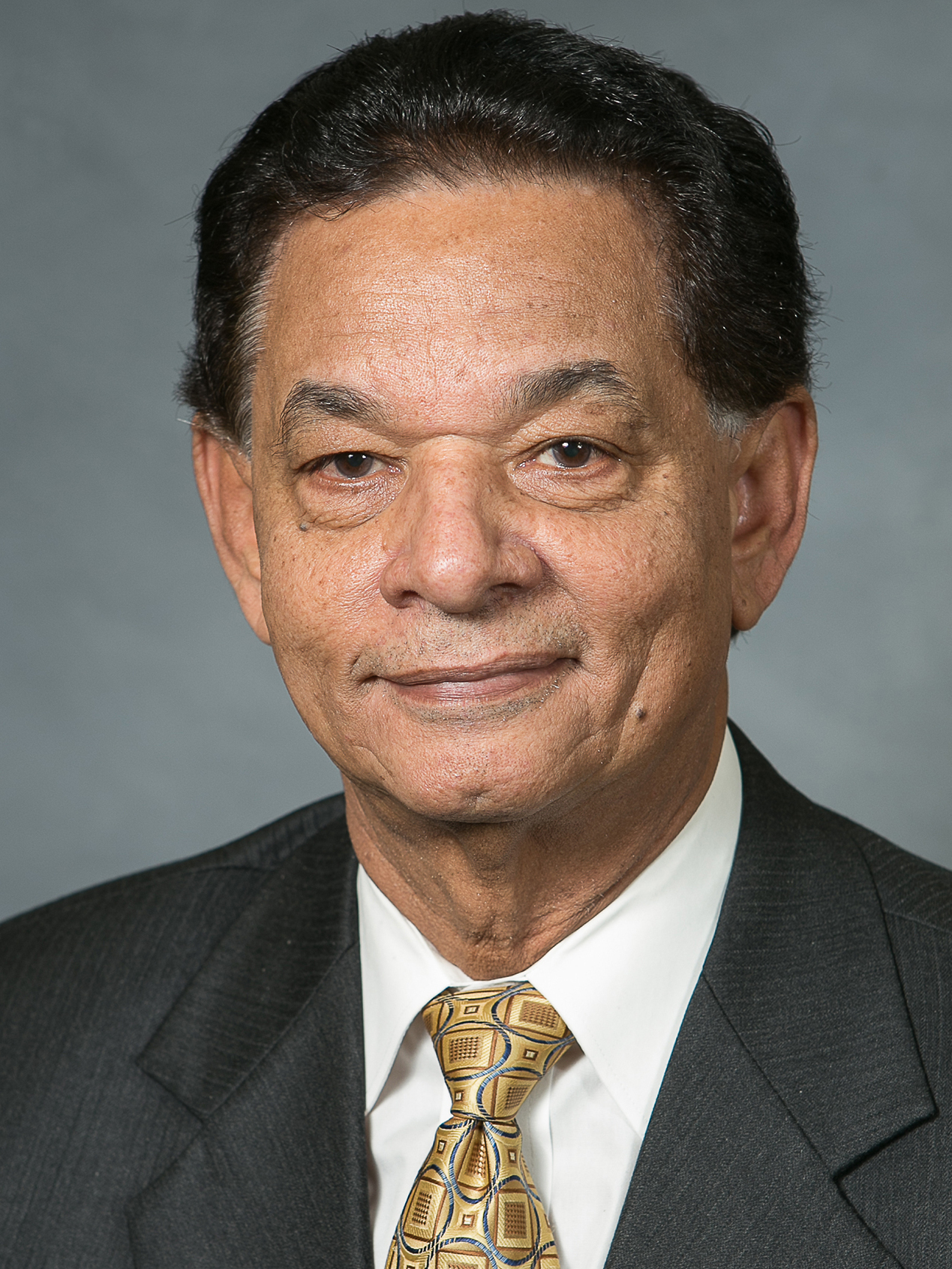
Nominee	David Rouzer	Charles Graham
Party	Republican	Democratic
Popular vote	164,047	120,222
Percentage	57.7%	42.3%
- Rouzer: 50–60% 60–70% 70–80% 80–90% >90% Graham: 50–60% 60–70% 70–80% 80–90% >90%
U.S. Representative before election
David Rouzer
Republican
Elected U.S. Representative
David Rouzer
Republican

The incumbent was Republican David Rouzer, who was re-elected with 60.2% of the vote in 2020.

The 7th district includes Bladen, Brunswick, Columbus, New Hanover, Pender, and Robeson counties, as well as a portion of Cumberland County.

=== Republican primary ===
==== Nominee ====
- David Rouzer, incumbent U.S. representative

==== Eliminated in primary ====
- Max Southworth-Beckwith, businessman and U.S. Marine veteran

==== Endorsements ====
David Rouzer

U.S. presidents

- Donald Trump, former president of the United States (2017–2021)

==== Results ====
Republican primary results
Party	Candidate	Votes	%
Republican	David Rouzer (incumbent)	39,203	79.2
Republican	Max Southworth-Beckwith	10,300	20.8
Total votes		49,503	100.0

=== Democratic primary ===
==== Nominee ====
- Charles Graham, state representative (since 2011)

==== Eliminated in primary ====
- Charles Evans, Cumberland County commissioner
- Yushonda Midgette
- Steve Miller, retired chemist

===== Withdrawn =====
- Jason Minnicozzi, assistant public defender (running for N.C. Senate)

==== Endorsements ====
Charles Graham

Organizations

- North Carolina AFL–CIO
- Sierra Club

==== Results ====
Primary results by county Graham: 40–50%; 70–80%; Evan: 50–60%; 60–70%; Miller: 30–40%; Midgette: 30–40%

Democratic primary results
Party	Candidate	Votes	%
Democratic	Charles Graham	13,054	31.2
Democratic	Charles E. Evans	12,263	29.3
Democratic	Steve Miller	9,744	23.3
Democratic	Yushonda Midgette	6,738	16.1
Total votes		41,799	100.0

=== General election ===
==== Predictions ====
Source	Ranking	As of
The Cook Political Report	Solid R	February 23, 2022
Inside Elections	Solid R	March 18, 2022
Sabato's Crystal Ball	Safe R	March 2, 2022
Politico	Solid R	November 7, 2022
RCP	Safe R	June 9, 2022
Fox News	Solid R	July 11, 2022
DDHQ	Solid R	July 20, 2022
538	Solid R	June 30, 2022
The Economist	Safe R	September 28, 2022

==== Results ====
2022 North Carolina's 7th congressional district election
Party	Candidate	Votes	%
Republican	David Rouzer (incumbent)	164,047	57.7
Democratic	Charles Graham	120,222	42.3
Total votes		284,269	100.0
Republican hold			

== District 8 ==
2022 North Carolina's 8th congressional district election
- November 8, 2022
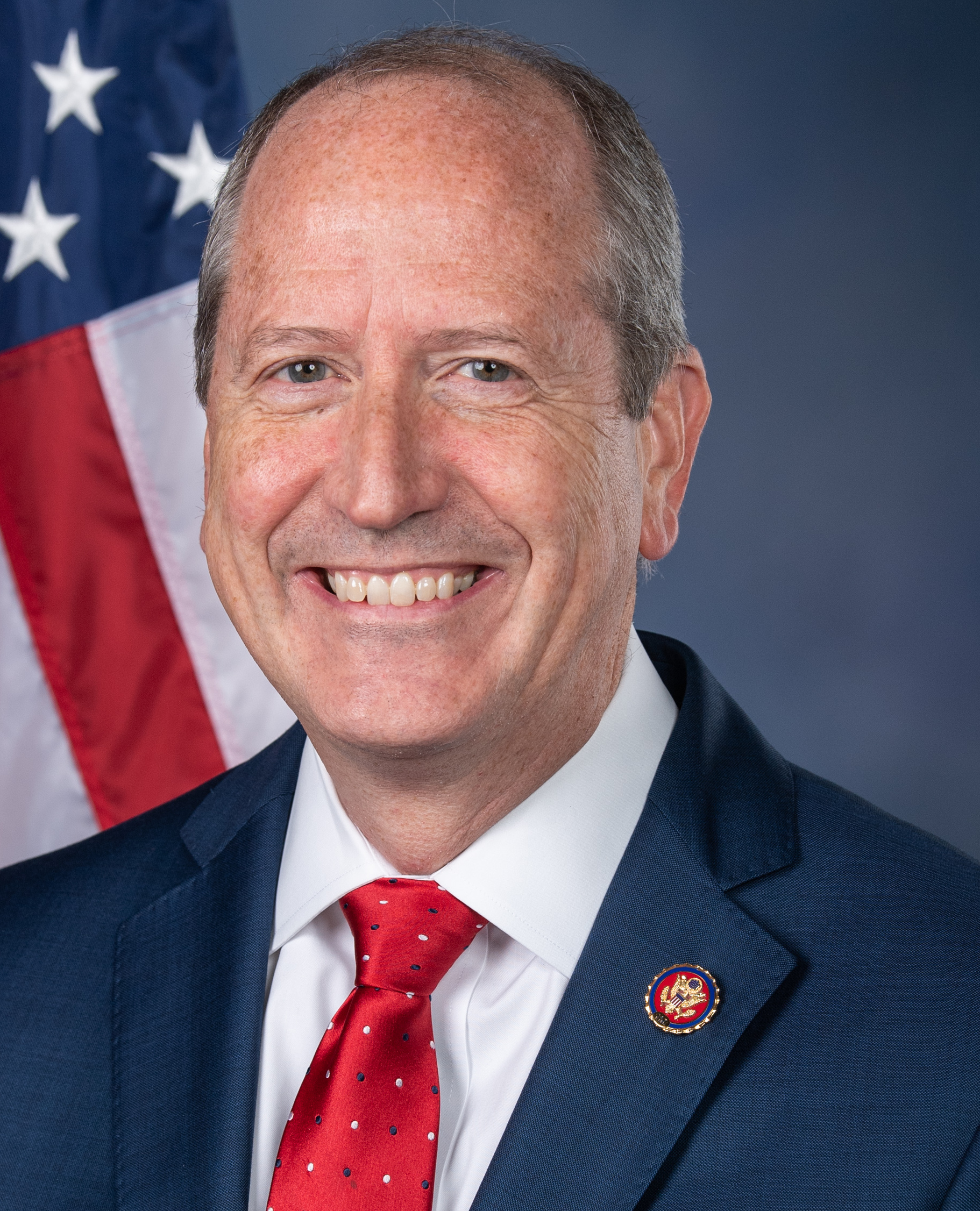

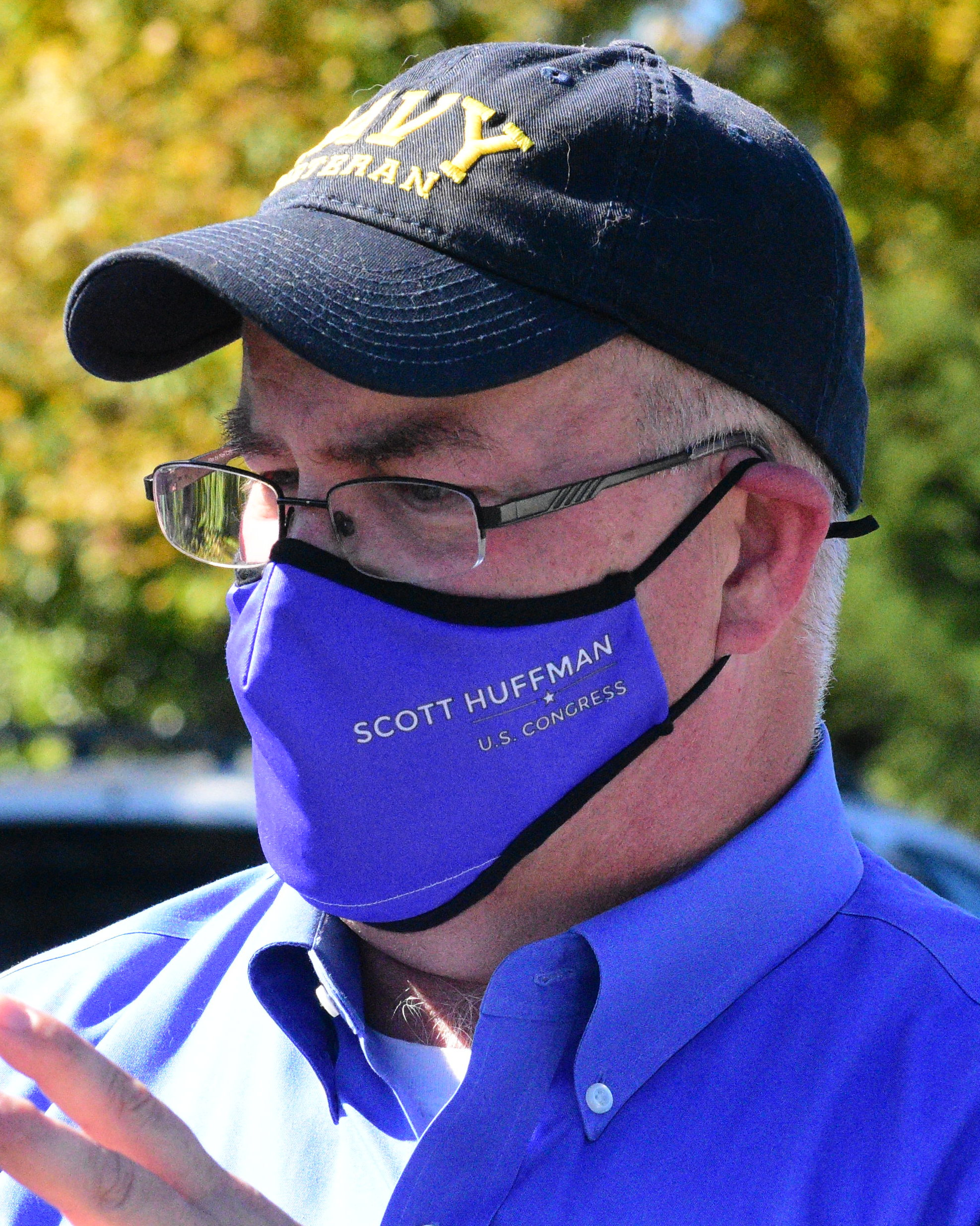
Nominee	Dan Bishop	Scott Huffman
Party	Republican	Democratic
Popular vote	183,998	79,192
Percentage	69.9%	30.1%
- Bishop: 50–60% 60–70% 70–80% 80–90% >90% Huffman: 50–60% 60–70% 70–80% 80–90% >90%
U.S. Representative before election
Dan Bishop
Republican
Elected U.S. Representative
Dan Bishop
Republican

Due to redistricting, the incumbent was Republican Dan Bishop, who was re-elected with 55.6% of the vote in 2020.

=== Republican primary ===
==== Candidates ====
===== Nominee =====
- Dan Bishop, incumbent U.S. representative from North Carolina's 9th congressional district

===== Declined =====
- Jon Hardister, state representative (running for re-election)
- Richard Hudson, incumbent U.S. representative (running in North Carolina's 9th congressional district)
- Mark Walker, former U.S. representative for North Carolina's 6th congressional district (2015–2021) (running for U.S. Senate)

==== Endorsements ====
Dan Bishop

Executive branch officials

- Donald Trump, 45th president of the United States (2017–2021)

Organizations

- Club for Growth

=== Democratic primary ===
==== Candidates ====
===== Nominee =====
- Scott Huffman, businessman and nominee for North Carolina's 13th congressional district in 2020

=== General election ===
==== Predictions ====
Source	Ranking	As of
The Cook Political Report	Solid R	February 23, 2022
Inside Elections	Solid R	March 18, 2022
Sabato's Crystal Ball	Safe R	March 2, 2022
Politico	Solid R	April 5, 2022
RCP	Safe R	June 9, 2022
Fox News	Solid R	July 11, 2022
DDHQ	Solid R	July 20, 2022
538	Solid R	June 30, 2022
The Economist	Safe R	September 28, 2022

==== Results ====
2022 North Carolina's 8th congressional district election
Party	Candidate	Votes	%
Republican	Dan Bishop (incumbent)	183,998	69.9
Democratic	Scott Huffman	79,192	30.1
Total votes		263,190	100.0
Republican hold			

== District 9 ==
2022 North Carolina's 9th congressional district election
- November 8, 2022
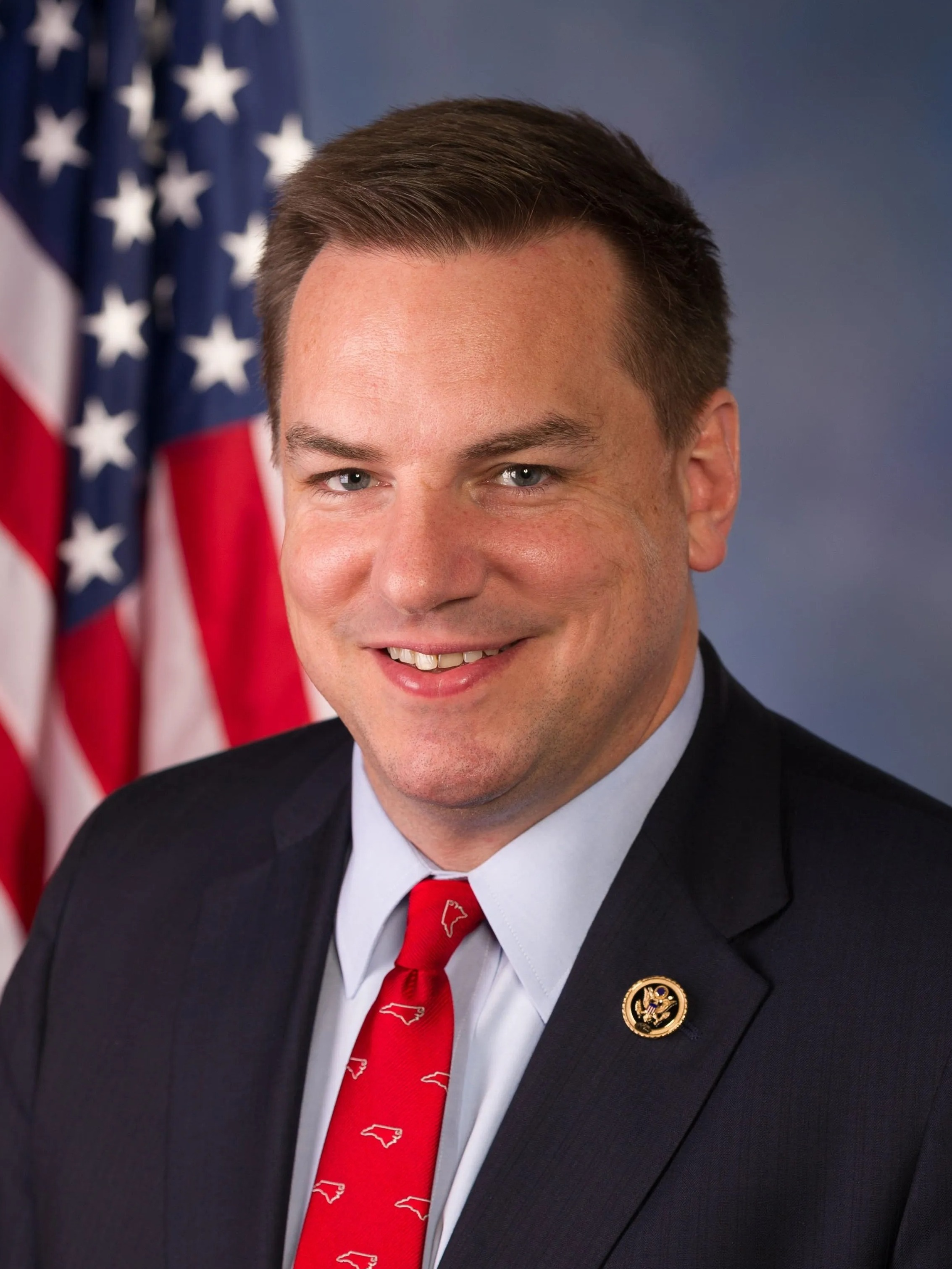

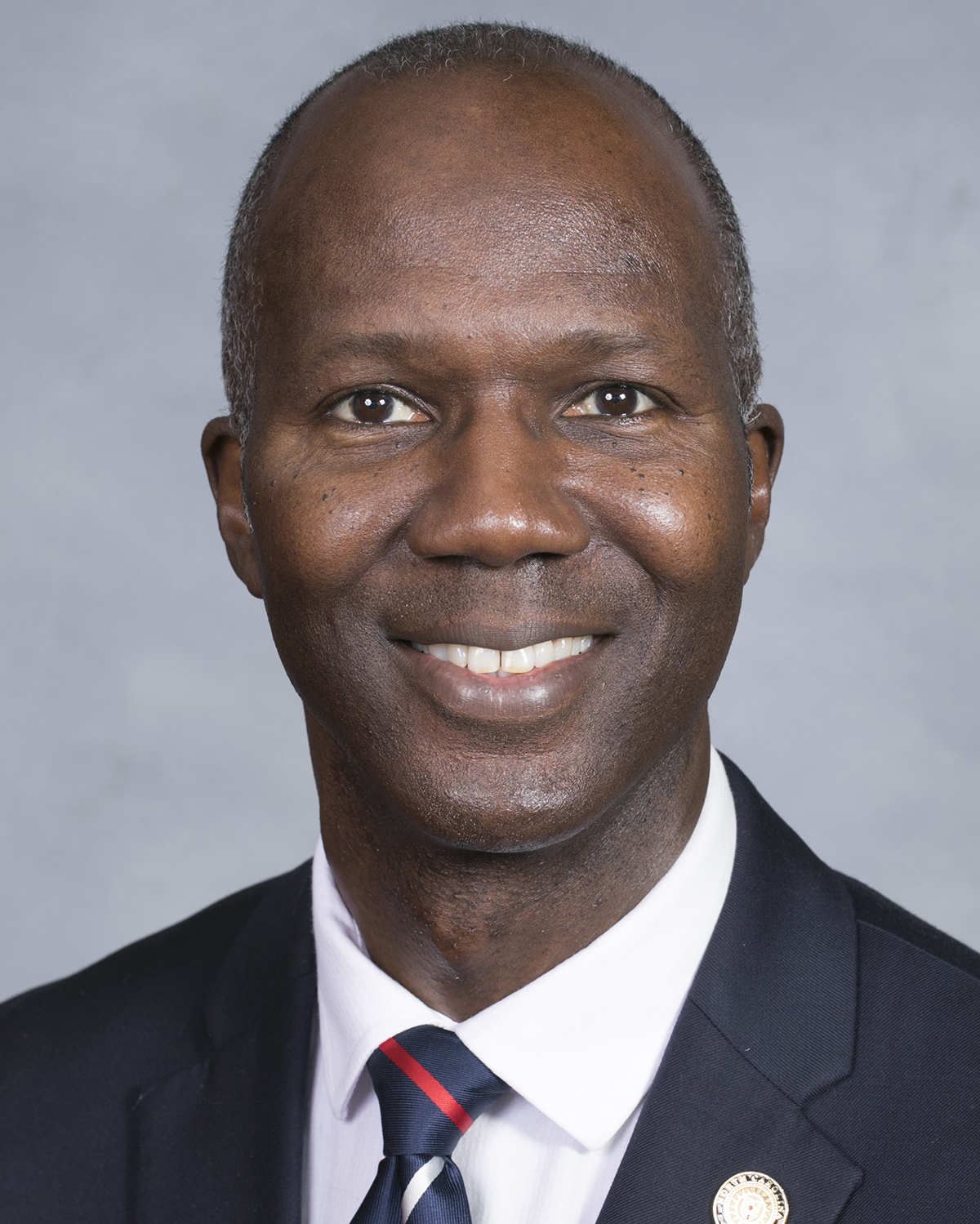
Nominee	Richard Hudson	Ben Clark
Party	Republican	Democratic
Popular vote	131,453	101,202
Percentage	56.5%	43.5%
- Hudson: 50–60% 60–70% 70–80% 80–90% >90% Clark: 50–60% 60–70% 70–80% 80–90% >90%
U.S. Representative before election
Richard Hudson (Republican)
Ted Budd (Republican)
Elected U.S. Representative
Richard Hudson
Republican

Due to redistricting after the 2020 census, Republican Representatives Richard Hudson and Ted Budd were moved to the same district. Budd declared his candidacy for U.S. Senate.

=== Republican primary ===
==== Candidates ====
===== Nominee =====
- Richard Hudson, incumbent U.S. representative from North Carolina's 8th congressional district

===== Eliminated in primary =====
- Michael Adriani
- Jennyfer Bucardo, substitute teacher
- Francisco Rios

===== Withdrawn =====
- Peter Boykin, political commentator (running for NC House District 63)
- Grayson Haff (running for NC House District 83)
- Nat Robertson, former mayor of Fayetteville (2013–2017) (previously filed to run in the new 4th district drawn by the state legislature, then withdrew due to court redistricting)
- John Szoka, state representative (since 2013) (running for Cumberland County Commissioner at-Large)

===== Declined =====
- Dan Bishop, incumbent U.S. representative (running in North Carolina's 8th congressional district)
- Ted Budd, incumbent U.S. representative (running for U.S. Senate)

==== Endorsements ====
Richard Hudson

U.S. presidents

- Donald Trump, former president of the United States (2017–2021)

Newspapers

- The Pilot (post-primary)

==== Results ====
Republican primary results
Party	Candidate	Votes	%
Republican	Richard Hudson (incumbent)	38,117	79.2
Republican	Jennyfer Bucardo	4,175	8.7
Republican	Michael Adriani	3,950	8.2
Republican	Francisco Rios	1,891	3.9
Total votes		48,133	100.0

=== Democratic primary ===
==== Candidates ====
===== Nominee =====
- Ben Clark, state senator (since 2013)

===== Withdrawn =====
- Maddie Parra, businesswoman

=== General election ===
==== Predictions ====
Source	Ranking	As of
The Cook Political Report	Solid R	February 23, 2022
Inside Elections	Solid R	March 18, 2022
Sabato's Crystal Ball	Safe R	April 19, 2022
Politico	Likely R	April 5, 2022
RCP	Safe R	June 9, 2022
Fox News	Solid R	July 11, 2022
DDHQ	Solid R	July 20, 2022
538	Solid R	June 30, 2022
The Economist	Safe R	September 28, 2022

==== Results ====
2022 North Carolina's 9th congressional district election
Party	Candidate	Votes	%
Republican	Richard Hudson (incumbent)	131,453	56.5
Democratic	Ben Clark	101,202	43.5
Total votes		232,655	100.0
Republican hold			

== District 10 ==
2022 North Carolina's 10th congressional district election
- November 8, 2022
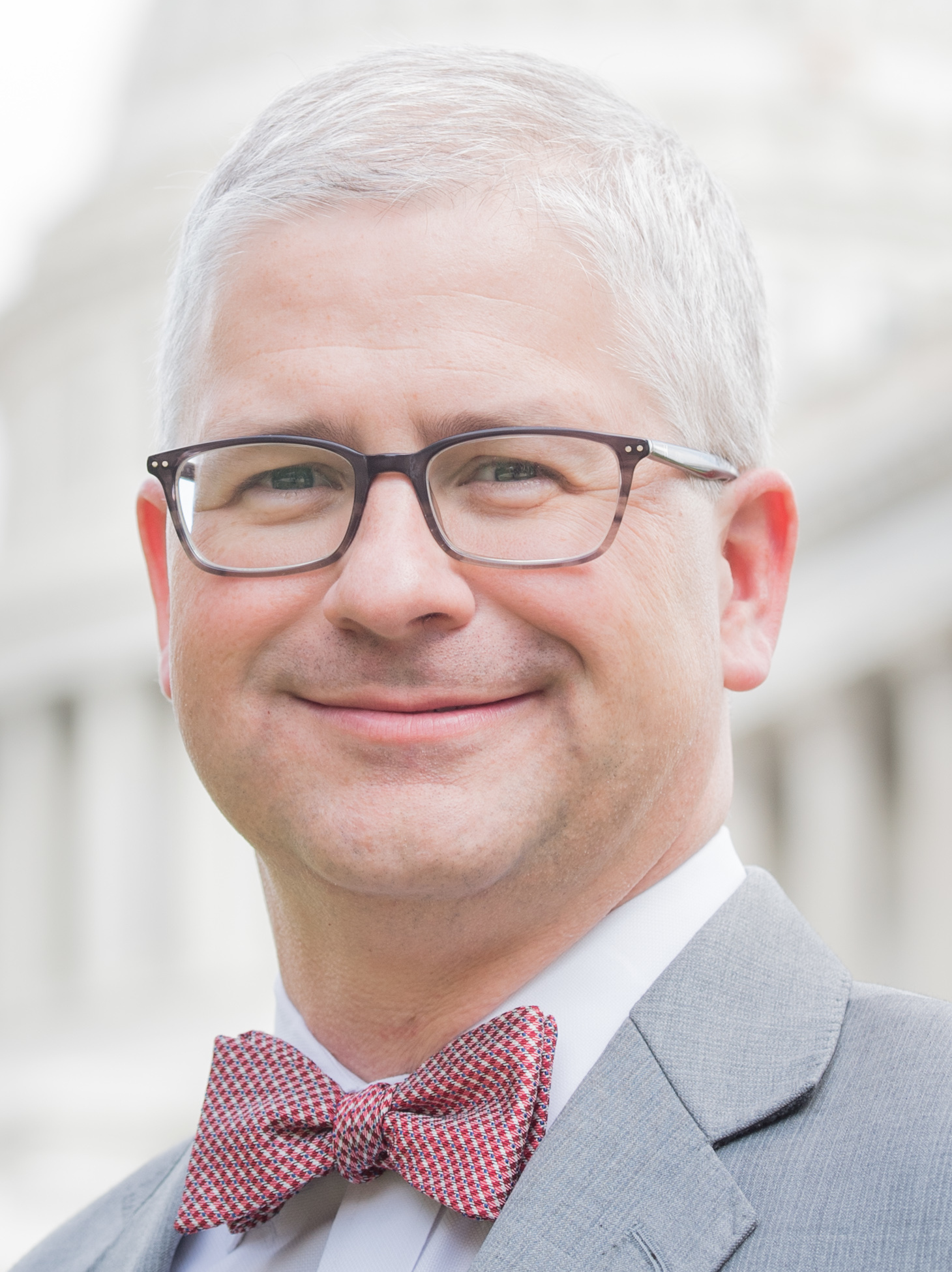

Nominee	Patrick McHenry	Pam Genant
Party	Republican	Democratic
Popular vote	194,681	73,174
Percentage	72.6%	27.3%
- McHenry: 50–60% 60–70% 70–80% 80–90% >90% Genant: 50–60% 60–70% 70–80% >90%
U.S. Representative before election
Patrick McHenry
Republican
Elected U.S. Representative
Patrick McHenry
Republican

The incumbent was Republican Patrick McHenry, who was re-elected with 68.9% of the vote in 2020.

=== Republican primary ===
==== Candidates ====
===== Nominee =====
- Patrick McHenry, incumbent U.S. representative

===== Eliminated in primary =====
- Jeff Gregory
- Michael Magnotta
- Gary Robinson
- Richard Speer, U.S. Army veteran

===== Declined =====
- Tim Moore, speaker of the North Carolina House of Representatives (2015–present)

==== Endorsements ====
Patrick McHenry

U.S. presidents

- Donald Trump, former president of the United States (2017–2021)

==== Results ====
Republican primary results
Party	Candidate	Votes	%
Republican	Patrick McHenry (incumbent)	49,973	68.1
Republican	Gary Robinson	11,671	15.9
Republican	Michael Magnotta	4,703	6.4
Republican	Jeff Gregory	3,649	5.0
Republican	Richard Speer	3,381	4.6
Total votes		73,377	100.0

=== Democratic primary ===
==== Candidates ====
===== Nominee =====
- Pam Genant, nurse and former Army officer

===== Eliminated in primary =====
- Michael Felder

==== Endorsements ====
Pam Genant

Organizations

- North Carolina AFL–CIO

==== Results ====
Democratic primary results
Party	Candidate	Votes	%
Democratic	Pam Genant	13,028	77.5
Democratic	Michael Felder	3,790	22.5
Total votes		16,818	100.0

=== General election ===
==== Predictions ====
Source	Ranking	As of
The Cook Political Report	Solid R	February 23, 2022
Inside Elections	Solid R	March 18, 2022
Sabato's Crystal Ball	Safe R	March 2, 2022
Politico	Solid R	April 5, 2022
RCP	Safe R	June 9, 2022
Fox News	Solid R	July 11, 2022
DDHQ	Solid R	July 20, 2022
538	Solid R	June 30, 2022
The Economist	Safe R	September 28, 2022

==== Results ====
2022 North Carolina's 10th congressional district election
Party	Candidate	Votes	%
Republican	Patrick McHenry (incumbent)	194,681	72.6
Democratic	Pam Genant	73,174	27.3
Write-in		352	0.1
Total votes		268,207	100.0
Republican hold			

== District 11 ==
2022 North Carolina's 11th congressional district election
- November 8, 2022
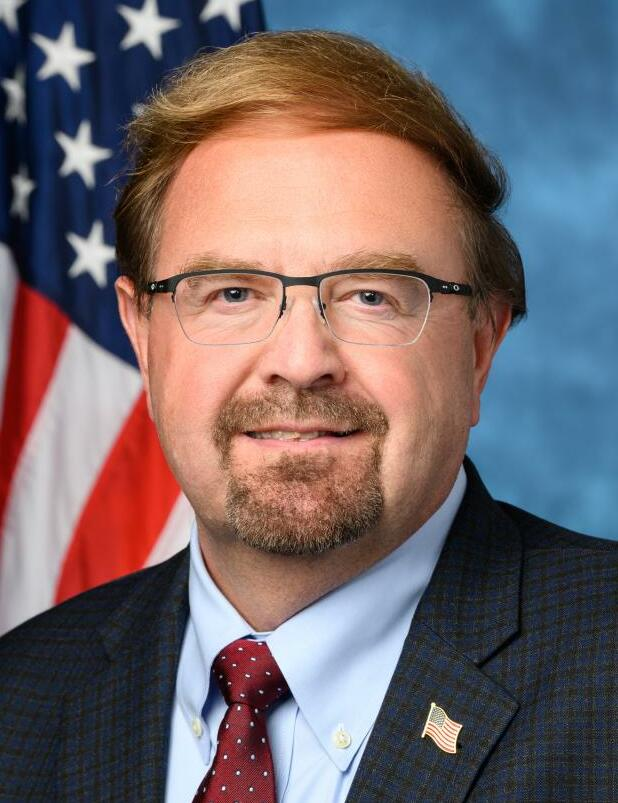

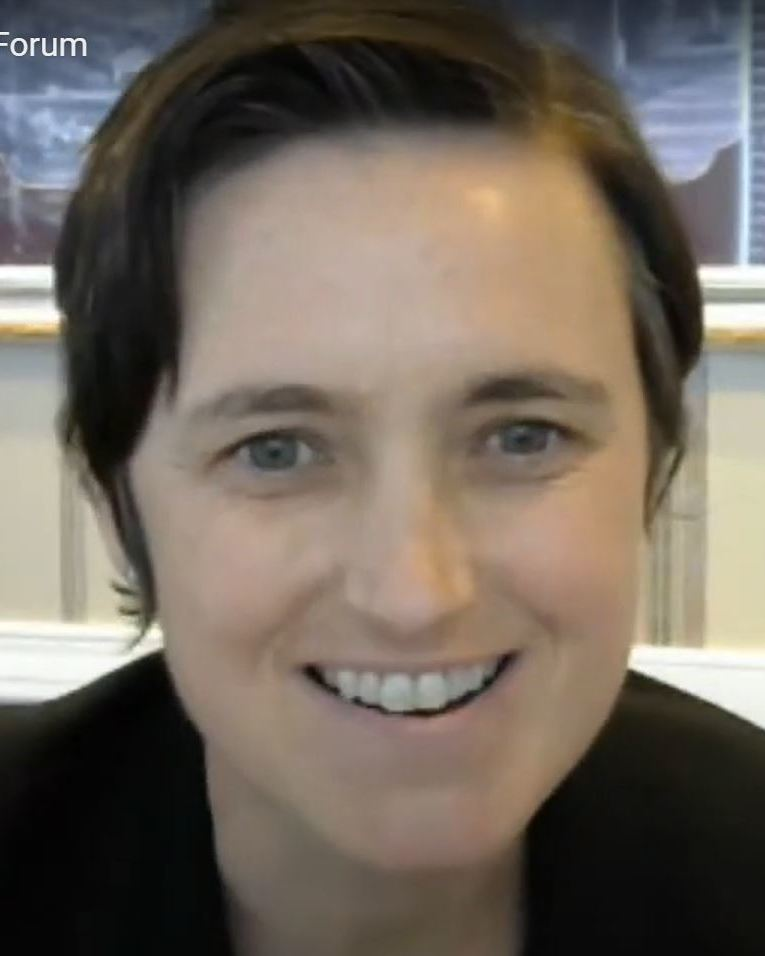
Nominee	Chuck Edwards	Jasmine Beach-Ferrara
Party	Republican	Democratic
Popular vote	174,232	144,165
Percentage	53.8%	44.5%
- Edwards: 40–50% 50–60% 60–70% 70–80% 80–90% Beach-Ferrara: 40–50% 50–60% 60–70% 70–80% 80–90% >90%
U.S. Representative before election
Madison Cawthorn
Republican
Elected U.S. Representative
Chuck Edwards
Republican

The incumbent was Republican Madison Cawthorn, who was elected with 54.5% of the vote in 2020. Due to Cawthorn's role in the January 6 United States Capitol attack, and other controversies, he was defeated for renomination in 2022 by North Carolina State Senator Chuck Edwards, who won the general election.

The 11th district includes Cherokee, Graham, Clay, Macon, Swain, Jackson, Haywood, Transylvania, Henderson, Buncombe, Madison, Yancey, Polk, and McDowell counties, as well as the western half of Rutherford County.

=== Republican primary ===
==== Nominee ====
- Chuck Edwards, state senator

==== Eliminated in primary ====
- Matthew Burril
- Madison Cawthorn, incumbent U.S. representative
- Rod Honeycutt, former U.S. Army colonel
- Wendy Nevarez, social security claims specialist and U.S. Navy veteran
- Bruce O'Connell, hotel manager
- Kristie Sluder
- Michele Woodhouse, North Carolina Republican Party district chair for NC-11

===== Withdrawn =====
- Eric Batchelor, Haywood County deputy sheriff

===== Declined =====
- Kevin Corbin, state senator

==== Endorsements ====
Madison Cawthorn

U.S. presidents

- Donald Trump, 45th president of the United States (2017–2021)

Organizations

- National Rifle Association-Political Victory Fund
- Turning Point Action
Chuck Edwards

U.S. senators

- Thom Tillis, U.S. senator from North Carolina (2015–present)

State legislators

- Phil Berger, president pro tempore of the North Carolina Senate (2011–present) from the 30th, 26th, and 12th districts (2001–present)
- Tim Moore, speaker of the North Carolina House of Representatives (2015–present) from the 111th district (2003–present)
Declined to endorse

U.S. senators

- Richard Burr, U.S. senator from North Carolina (2005–2023), former U.S. Representative from North Carolina's 5th congressional district (1995–2005)

==== Polling ====
Poll source	Date(s) administered	Sample size	Margin of error	Matthew Burril	Madison Cawthorn	Chuck Edwards	Rod Honeycutt	Bruce O'Connell	Wendy Nevarez	Kristie Sluder	Michele Woodhouse	Other	Undecided
Differentiators Data (R) (Note: Poll sponsored by GOPAC, which has not endorsed any candidate in the Republican primary for the 11th congressional district)	April 25–26, 2022	400 (LV)	± 4.9%	4%	38%	21%	5%	2%	5%	0%	5%	–	21%
Differentiators Data (R)	March 10–13, 2022	500 (LV)	± 4.5%	3%	49%	14%	4%	1%	2%	1%	3%	–	23%
Public Opinion Strategies (R) (Note: Poll sponsored by Edwards's campaign)	March 10–13, 2022	300 (LV)	± 5.7%	–	52%	20%	–	–	–	–	–	11%	17%
Spry Strategies (R) (Note: Poll sponsored by Cawthorn's campaign)	March 2022	603 (LV)	± 4.0%	5%	62%	10%	2%	6%	3%	–	1%	–	11%

==== Results ====
Results by county Edwards: 20–30% 30–40% 40–50% 50–60% 60–70% Cawthorn: 20–30% 30–40% 40–50% 50–60% Nevarez: 20–30% 30–40% 40–50% 50–60% O'Connell: 30–40% Honeycutt: 20–30% Tie: 20–30% 30–40%

Results by precinct Edwards: 20–30% 30–40% 40–50% 50–60% 60–70% Cawthorn: 20–30% 30–40% 40–50% 50–60% Nevarez: 20–30% 30–40% 40–50% 50–60% O'Connell: 30–40% Honeycutt: 20–30% Tie: 20–30% 30–40%

Republican primary results
Party	Candidate	Votes	%
Republican	Chuck Edwards	29,496	33.4
Republican	Madison Cawthorn (incumbent)	28,112	31.9
Republican	Matthew Burril	8,341	9.5
Republican	Bruce O'Connell	6,037	6.8
Republican	Rod Honeycutt	5,775	6.5
Republican	Michele Woodhouse	4,668	5.3
Republican	Wendy Nevarez	4,525	5.1
Republican	Kristie Sluder	1,304	1.5
Total votes		88,258	100.0

=== Democratic primary ===
==== Candidates ====
===== Nominee =====
- Jasmine Beach-Ferrara, Buncombe County commissioner

===== Eliminated in primary =====
- Jay Carey, U.S. Army veteran
- Katie Dean, auto repair shop owner
- Marco Gutierrez
- Bo Hess, psychotherapist
- Bynum Lunsford

===== Withdrawn =====
- Eric Gash, pastor
- Josh Remillard, veteran (running for N.C. House)
- Brooker Smith, U.S. Air Force veteran

==== Endorsements ====
Jasmine Beach-Ferrara

Organizations

- Equality North Carolina
- Equality PAC (post-primary)
- LGBTQ Victory Fund
- LPAC
- North Carolina AFL–CIO
- Sierra Club

==== Results ====
Democratic primary results
Party	Candidate	Votes	%
Democratic	Jasmine Beach-Ferrara	32,478	59.7
Democratic	Katie Dean	13,957	25.6
Democratic	Jay Carey	3,858	7.1
Democratic	Bo Hess	2,082	3.8
Democratic	Marco Gutierrez	1,040	1.9
Democratic	Bynum Lunsford	1,002	1.8
Total votes		54,417	100.0

=== Independents and third parties ===
==== Candidates ====
===== Declared =====
- David Coatney (Libertarian)

=== General election ===
==== Predictions ====
Source	Ranking	As of
The Cook Political Report	Solid R	February 23, 2022
Inside Elections	Solid R	March 18, 2022
Sabato's Crystal Ball	Safe R	March 2, 2022
Politico	Solid R	May 23, 2022
RCP	Safe R	June 9, 2022
Fox News	Solid R	July 11, 2022
DDHQ	Solid R	July 20, 2022
538	Solid R	June 30, 2022
The Economist	Likely R	November 4, 2022

==== Polling ====
Poll source	Date(s) administered	Sample size	Margin of error	Chuck Edwards (R)	Jasmine Beach-Ferrara (D)	David Coatney (L)	Undecided
Survey 160 (D) (Note: Poll sponsored by Beach-Ferrara's campaign)	May 18–20, 2022	308 (LV)	± 6.0%	46%	40%	6%	8%

==== Results ====
2022 North Carolina's 11th congressional district election
Party	Candidate	Votes	%
Republican	Chuck Edwards	174,232	53.8
Democratic	Jasmine Beach-Ferrara	144,165	44.5
Libertarian	David Coatney	5,515	1.7
Total votes		323,912	100.0
Republican hold			

== District 12 ==
2022 North Carolina's 12th congressional district election
- November 8, 2022
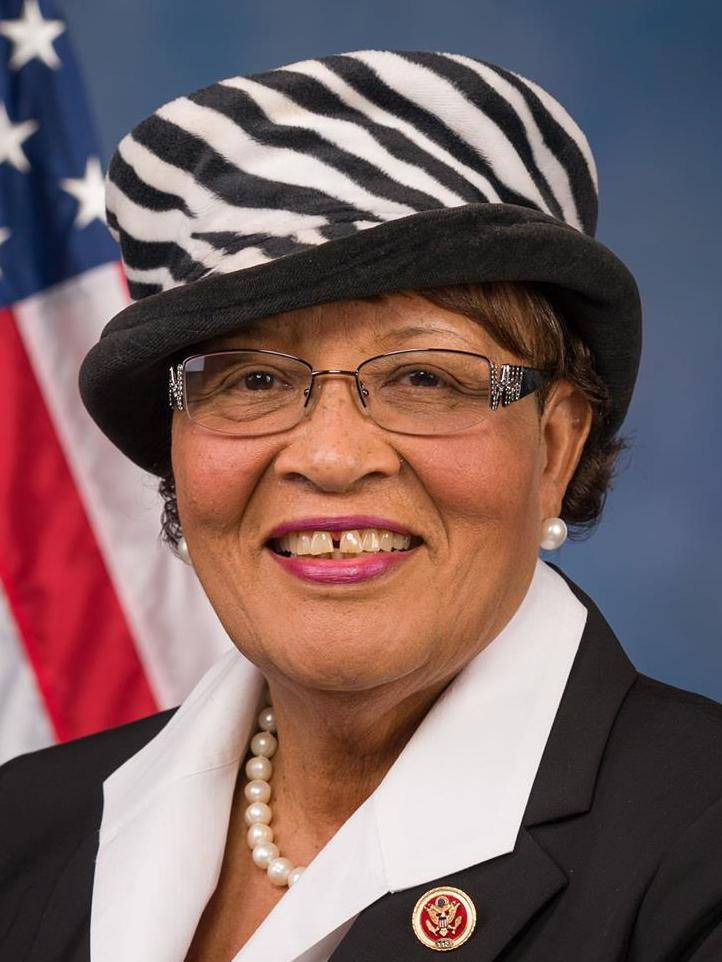

Nominee	Alma Adams	Tyler Lee
Party	Democratic	Republican
Popular vote	140,494	83,414
Percentage	62.75%	37.25%
- Adams: 50–60% 60–70% 70–80% 80–90% >90% Lee: 50–60% 60–70% Tie: 50%
U.S. Representative before election
Alma Adams
Democratic
Elected U.S. Representative
Alma Adams
Democratic

The incumbent was Democrat Alma Adams, who was re-elected unopposed in 2020.

=== Democratic primary ===
==== Candidates ====
===== Nominee =====
- Alma Adams, incumbent U.S. representative

===== Eliminated in primary =====
- John Sharkey

==== Endorsements ====
Alma Adams

Organizations

- Equality North Carolina
- Feminist Majority PAC
- NARAL Pro-Choice America
- North Carolina AFL–CIO
- Progressive Democrats of America
- Sierra Club

==== Results ====
Democratic primary results
Party	Candidate	Votes	%
Democratic	Alma Adams (incumbent)	37,984	91.7
Democratic	John Sharkey	3,460	8.3
Total votes		41,444	100.0

=== Republican primary ===
==== Candidates ====
===== Nominee =====
- Tyler Lee, real estate investor

===== Eliminated in primary =====
- Andrew Huffman
- Nalini Joseph

==== Results ====
Primary results by county: Lee: 40–50%

Republican primary results
Party	Candidate	Votes	%
Republican	Tyler Lee	10,388	42.9
Republican	Andrew Huffman	8,311	34.3
Republican	Nalini Joseph	5,543	22.9
Total votes		24,242	100.0

=== General election ===
==== Predictions ====
Source	Ranking	As of
The Cook Political Report	Solid D	February 23, 2022
Inside Elections	Solid D	March 18, 2022
Sabato's Crystal Ball	Safe D	March 2, 2022
Politico	Solid D	April 5, 2022
RCP	Safe D	June 9, 2022
Fox News	Solid D	July 11, 2022
DDHQ	Solid D	July 20, 2022
538	Solid D	June 30, 2022
The Economist	Safe D	September 28, 2022

==== Results ====
2022 North Carolina's 12th congressional district election
Party	Candidate	Votes	%
Democratic	Alma Adams (incumbent)	140,494	62.8
Republican	Tyler Lee	83,414	37.2
Total votes		223,908	100.0
Democratic hold			

== District 13 ==
2022 North Carolina's 13th congressional district election
- November 8, 2022
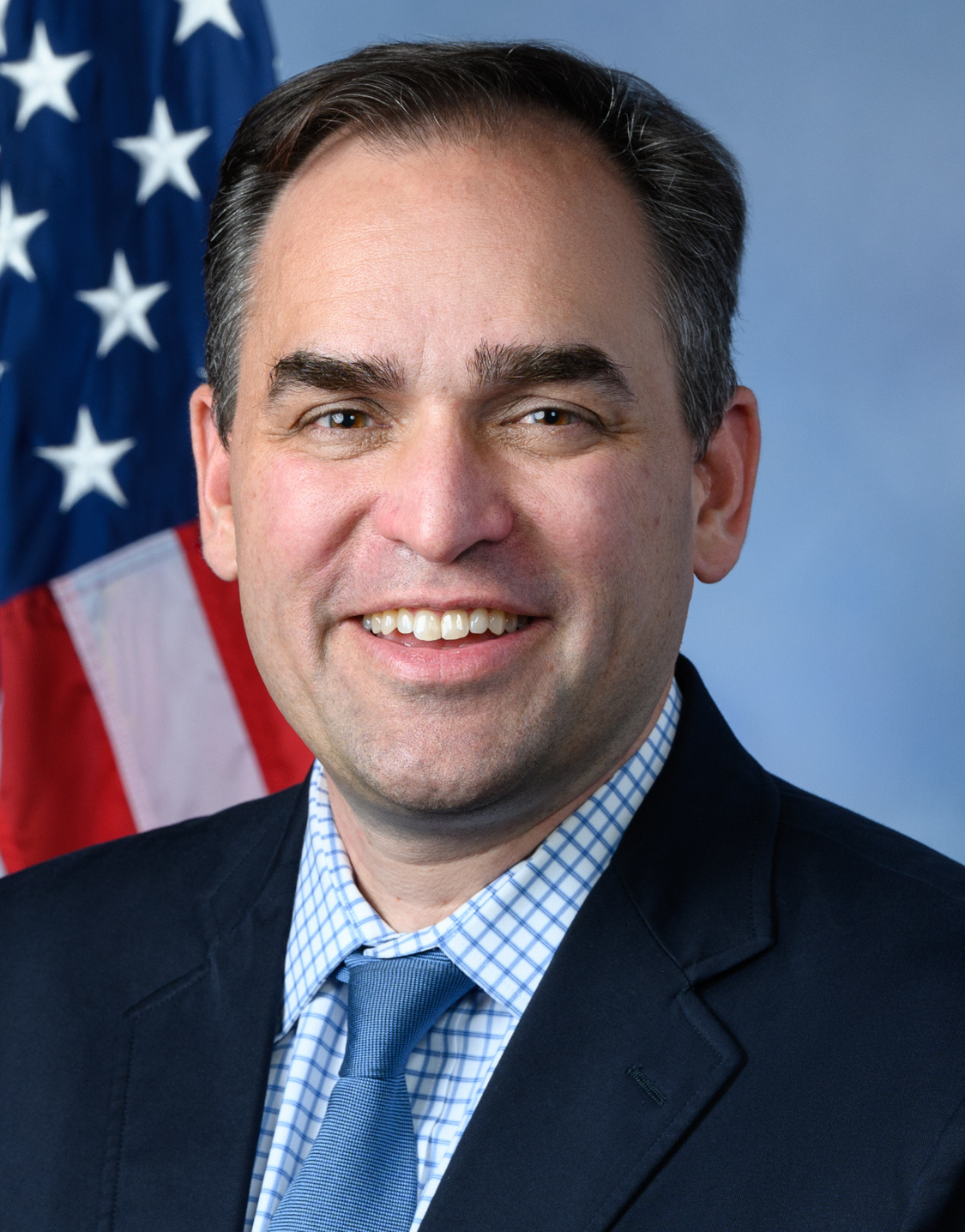

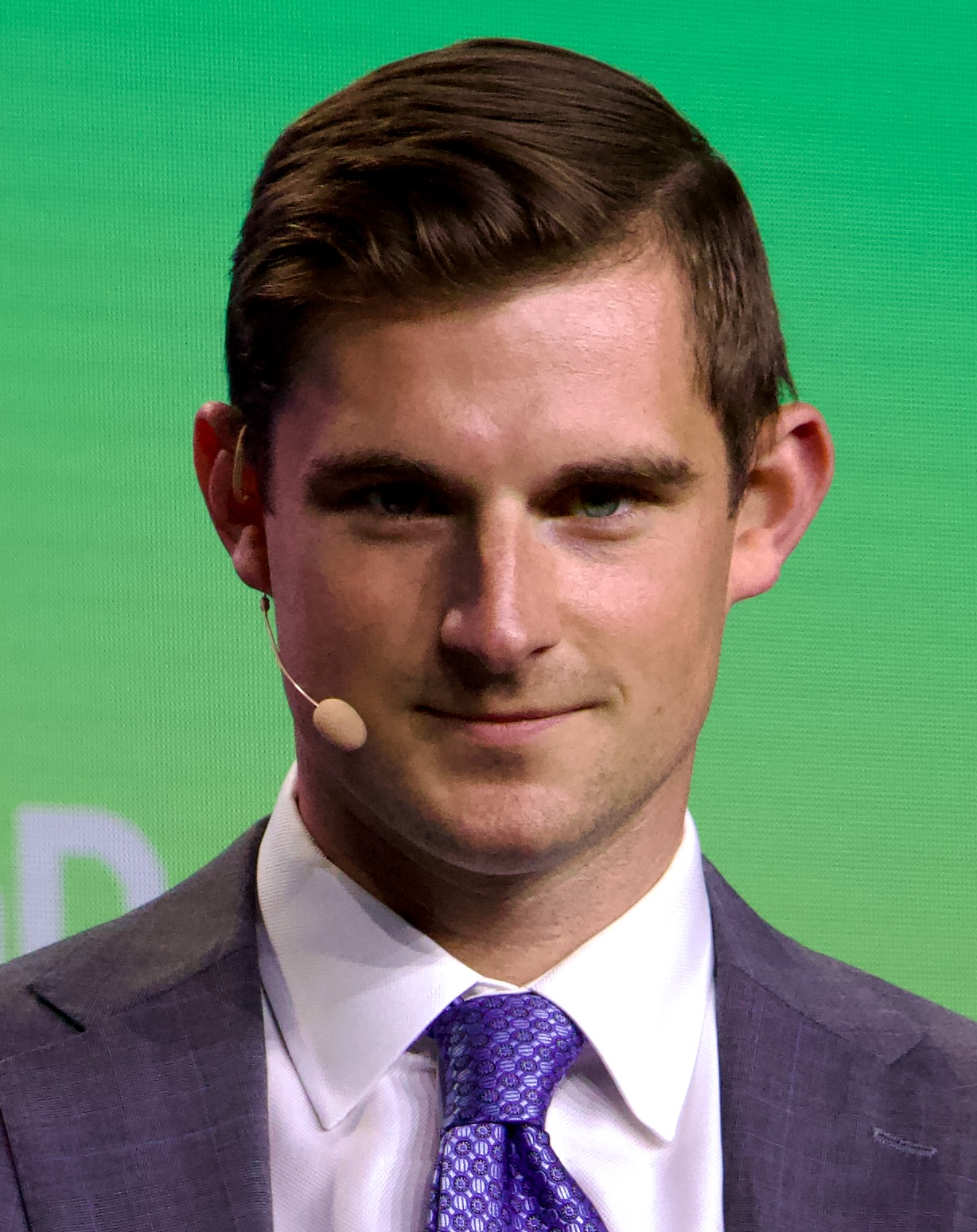
Nominee	Wiley Nickel	Bo Hines
Party	Democratic	Republican
Popular vote	143,090	134,256
Percentage	51.6%	48.4%
- Nickel: 50–60% 60–70% 70–80% 80–90% >90% Hines: 50–60% 60–70% 70–80% 80–90%
U.S. Representative before election
Vacant
(new district)
Elected U.S. Representative
Wiley Nickel
Democratic

Due to redistricting after the 2020 census, this is a new district with no incumbent.

The 13th district includes all of Johnston County, the southern half of Wake County, the western half of Wayne County, and the eastern half of Harnett County. Democratic nominee Wiley Nickel defeated Republican nominee Bo Hines in the November 8 general election by 8,834 votes.

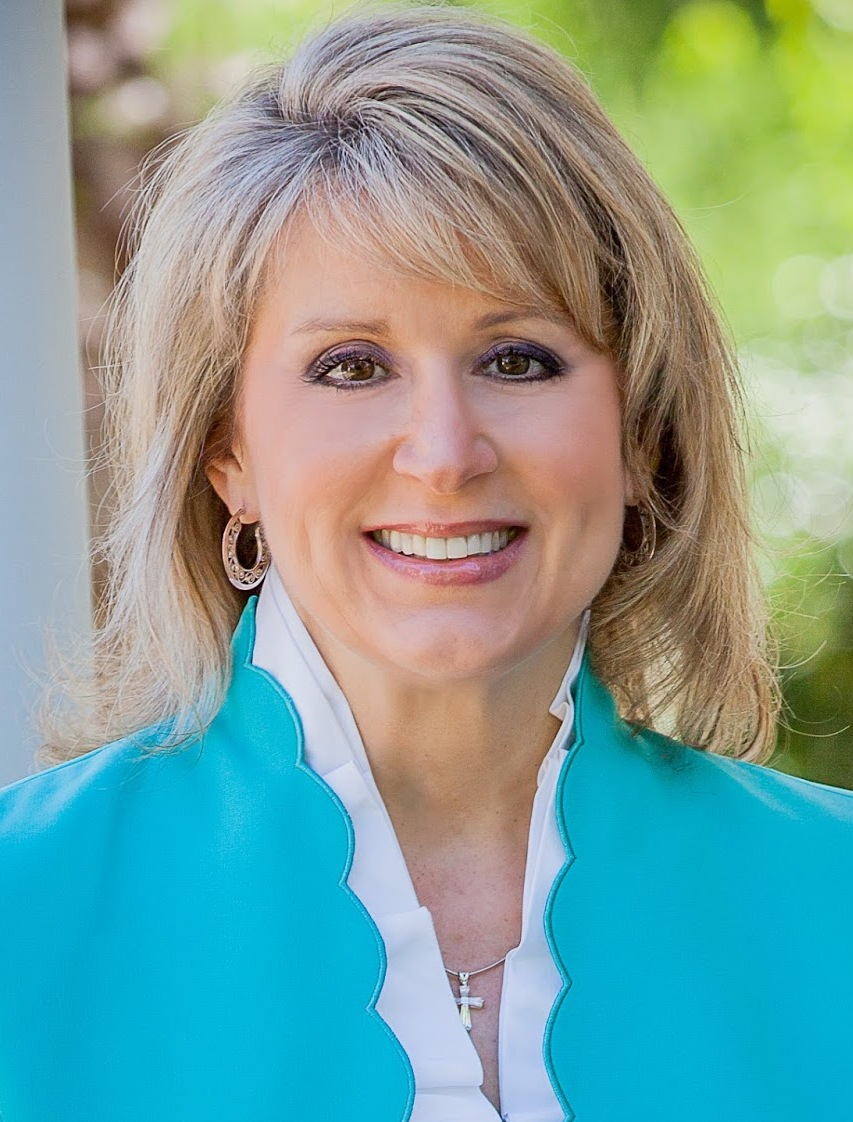
Former U.S. Representative Renee Ellmers finished fifth in the primary.

=== Republican primary ===
==== Candidates ====
===== Nominee =====
- Bo Hines, former college football player

===== Eliminated in primary =====
- DeVan Barbour, RNC delegate
- Kelly Daughtry, attorney and daughter of N. Leo Daughtry
- Renee Ellmers, former U.S. representative for North Carolina's 2nd congressional district (2011–2017) and candidate for lieutenant governor in 2020
- Kent Keirsey, businessman and U.S. Army reserve officer
- Jessica Morel
- Chad Slotta, businessman
- Kevin Alan Wolff

===== Endorsements =====
Bo Hines

U.S. executive branch officials

- Donald Trump, 45th president of the United States (2017–2021)

U.S. representatives

- Kat Cammack, U.S. representative from Florida's 3rd congressional district (2021–present)
- Madison Cawthorn, U.S. representative from North Carolina's 11th congressional district (2021–2023)
- Marjorie Taylor Greene, U.S. representative from Georgia's 14th congressional district (2021–present)

Individuals

- Ryan Fournier, chairman of Students for Trump
- Catalina Lauf, Illinois congressional candidate and former Trump administration staffer
- Karoline Leavitt, New Hampshire congressional candidate and former assistant press secretary to Donald Trump

Organizations

- Club for Growth
- House Freedom Fund
- Turning Point Action
Kent Keirsey

U.S. senators

- Tom Cotton, U.S. senator from Arkansas (2015–present)

==== Polling ====
Poll source	Date(s) administered	Sample size	Margin of error	DeVan Barbour	Tony Cowden	Kelly Daughtry	Bo Hines	Alan Swain	John Szoka	Undecided
WPA Intelligence (R)	February 2022	– (LV)	–	7%	1%	14%	9%	6%	11%	51%

==== Results ====
Primary results by county: Hines: 30–40%; 40–50%; Barbour: 30–40%

Republican primary results
Party	Candidate	Votes	%
Republican	Bo Hines	17,602	32.1
Republican	DeVan Barbour	12,426	22.6
Republican	Kelly Daughtry	9,300	16.9
Republican	Kent Keirsey	6,223	11.3
Republican	Renee Ellmers	5,176	9.4
Republican	Chad Slotta	3,074	5.6
Republican	Jessica Morel	738	1.3
Republican	Kevin Alan Wolff	344	0.6
Total votes		54,883	100.0

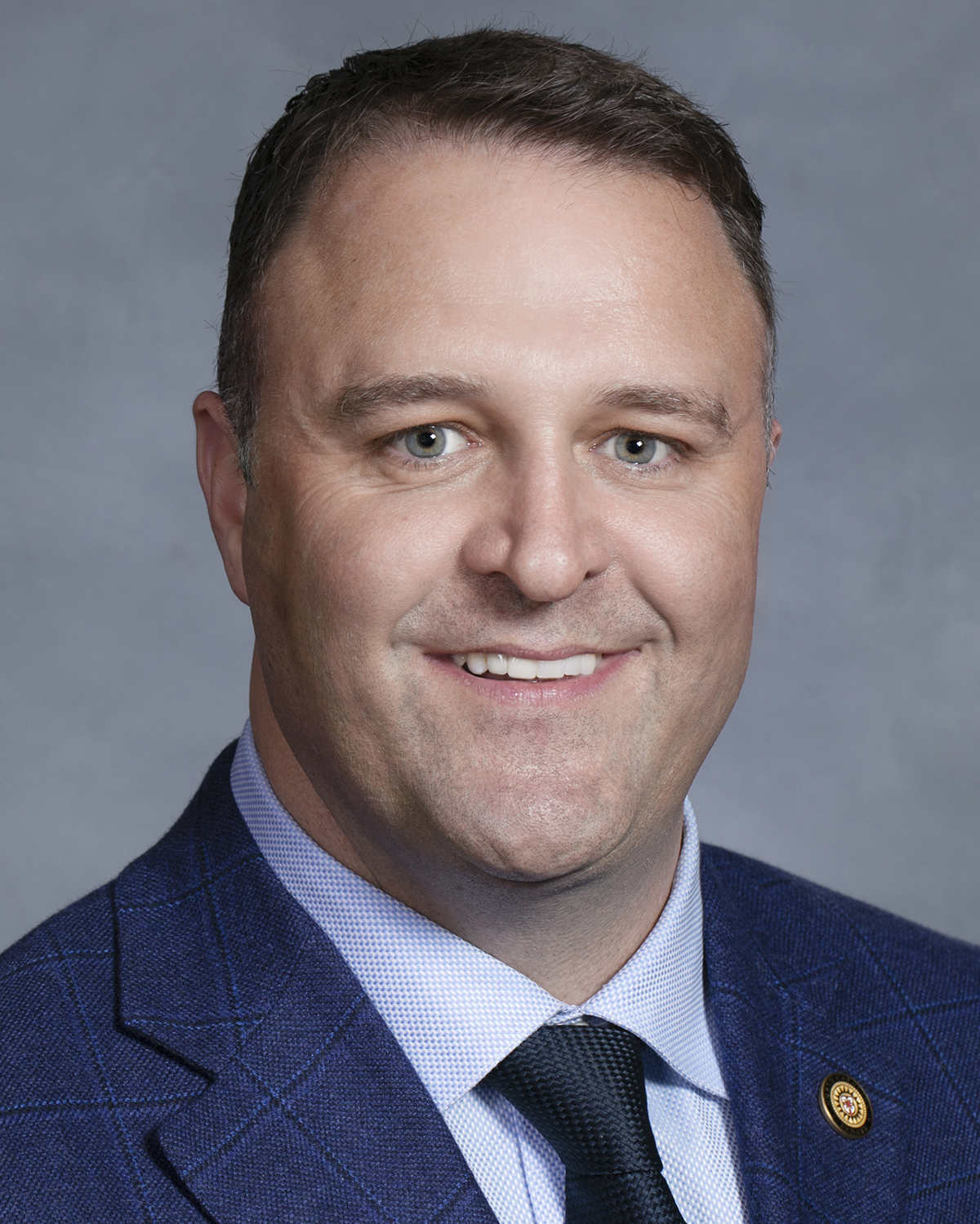
Former state senator Sam Searcy finished second in the primary.

=== Democratic primary ===
==== Candidates ====
===== Nominee =====
- Wiley Nickel, state senator (since 2019) (previously filed to run in North Carolina's 4th congressional district)

===== Eliminated in primary =====
- Jamie Campbell Bowles
- Nathan Click, Air Force veteran and small business owner
- Denton Lee, teacher and unaffiliated candidate for North Carolina's 26th General Assembly District in 2020
- Sam Searcy, former state senator (2019–2020)

===== Endorsements =====
Wiley Nickel

State officials

- Rufus L. Edmisten, former North Carolina Secretary of State (1989–1996), former North Carolina attorney general (1974–1984)

State legislators

- Allen Wellons, former member of the North Carolina Senate from the 11th district (1997–2003)

Newspapers and publications

- The News & Observer

Organizations

- Alliance for Retired Americans
- Equality North Carolina
- Human Rights Campaign PAC
- League of Conservation Voters Action Fund
- NARAL Pro-Choice America (post-primary)
- Sierra Club

Labor unions

- North Carolina State AFL–CIO
Sam Searcy

Newspapers and publications

- Indy Week (primary only)

==== Results ====
Democratic primary results
Party	Candidate	Votes	%
Democratic	Wiley Nickel	23,155	51.6
Democratic	Sam Searcy	10,284	22.9
Democratic	Jamie Campbell Bowles	4,217	9.4
Democratic	Nathan Click	3,866	8.6
Democratic	Denton Lee	3,311	7.4
Total votes		44,833	100.0

=== General election ===
==== Predictions ====
Source	Ranking	As of
The Cook Political Report	Tossup	February 23, 2022
Inside Elections	Tossup	March 18, 2022
Sabato's Crystal Ball	Lean R	July 28, 2022
Politico	Tossup	April 5, 2022
RCP	Lean R	June 9, 2022
Fox News	Lean R	November 1, 2022
DDHQ	Likely R	July 20, 2022
538	Likely R	October 21, 2022
The Economist	Tossup	September 28, 2022

==== Polling ====
Aggregate polls

Source of poll aggregation	Dates administered	Dates updated	Bo Hines (R)	Wiley Nickel (D)	Undecided (Note: Calculated by taking the difference of 100% and all other candidates combined.)	Margin
FiveThirtyEight	August 6 – October 24, 2022	October 26, 2022	41.8%	42.6%	15.6%	Nickel +0.9

Graphical summary

Poll source	Date(s) administered	Sample size	Margin of error	Bo Hines (R)	Wiley Nickel (D)	Other	Undecided
SurveyUSA (R) (Note: Poll sponsored by the John Locke Foundation, a conservative think tank.)	October 21–24, 2022	584 (LV)	± 4.2%	43%	44%	–	13%
Global Strategy Group (D)	August 29 – September 1, 2022	500 (LV)	± 4.4%	40%	44%	–	16%
Public Policy Polling (D)	August 23–24, 2022	506 (V)	± 4.4%	40%	40%	–	20%
RMG Research	July 31 – August 6, 2022	400 (LV)	± 4.9%	44%	39%	3%	14%
DCCC Targeting and Analytics Department (D) (Note: Poll conducted in-house by and for the DCCC.)	May 18–19, 2022	429 (LV)	± 4.7%	43%	45%	–	12%

Hypothetical polling

Generic Republican vs. generic Democrat

Poll source	Date(s) administered	Sample size	Margin of error	Generic Republican	Generic Democrat	Undecided
Change Research (D) (Note: Poll sponsored by the House Majority PAC.)	October 19, 2022	–	–	45%	43%	12%
Public Policy Polling (D)	October 18, 2022	–	–	42%	42%	16%
DCCC Targeting and Analytics Department (D)	May 18–19, 2022	429 (LV)	± 4.7%	48%	45%	7%

==== Results ====
2022 North Carolina's 13th congressional district election
Party	Candidate	Votes	%
Democratic	Wiley Nickel	143,090	51.6
Republican	Bo Hines	134,256	48.4
Total votes		277,346	100.0
Democratic win (new seat)			

== District 14 ==
2022 North Carolina's 14th congressional district election
- November 8, 2022
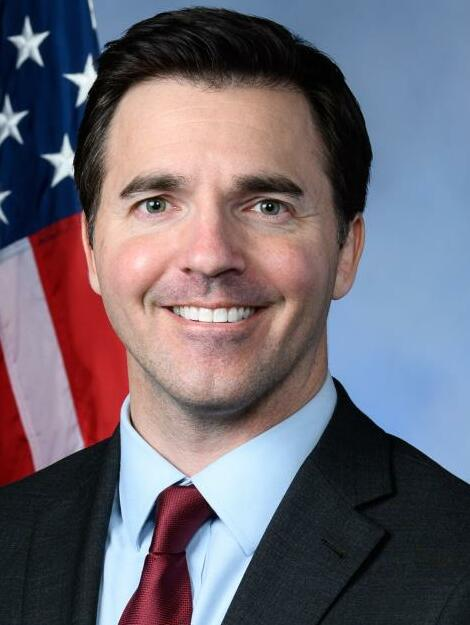

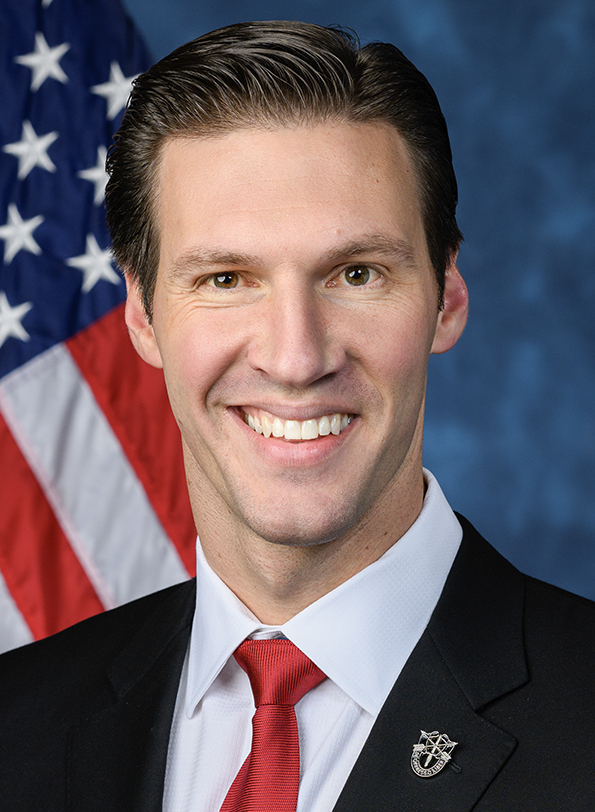
Nominee	Jeff Jackson	Pat Harrigan
Party	Democratic	Republican
Popular vote	148,738	109,014
Percentage	57.7%	42.3%
- Jackson: 50–60% 60–70% 70–80% 80–90% ≥90% Harrigan: 50–60% 60–70% 70–80% 80–90%
U.S. Representative before election
Vacant
(new district)
Elected U.S. Representative
Jeff Jackson
Democratic

Due to redistricting after the 2020 census, this is a new district with no incumbent. The Democratic nominee, State Senator Jeff Jackson, defeated the Republican nominee Pat Harrigan by 39,724 votes.

=== Democratic primary ===
==== Candidates ====
===== Nominee =====
- Jeff Jackson, state senator from the 37th district (2014–present) (previously ran for U.S. Senate)

===== Eliminated in primary =====
- Ramin Mammadov, quality assurance manager

===== Declined =====
- Chaz Beasley, former state representative from the 92nd district (2017–2021), candidate for lieutenant governor in 2020
- Julie Eiselt, mayor pro tem of Charlotte (2017–present), at-large member of the Charlotte City Council (2015–present)
- Malcolm Graham, member of the Charlotte City Council from the 2nd district (2019–present) and 1st district (1999–2004), former state senator from the 40th district (2005–2015)
- Brandon Lofton, state representative from the 104th district (2019–present) (running for re-election)
- Vi Lyles, mayor of Charlotte (2017–present), former mayor pro tempore of Charlotte (2015–2017) (running for re-election)
- Dan McCready, former U.S. Marine, businessman, and nominee for North Carolina's 9th congressional district in 2018 and 2019

==== Results ====
Democratic primary results
Party	Candidate	Votes	%
Democratic	Jeff Jackson	34,724	86.1
Democratic	Ramin Mammadov	5,598	13.9
Total votes		40,322	100.0

=== Republican primary ===
==== Candidates ====
===== Nominee =====
- Pat Harrigan, businessman and Green Beret

===== Eliminated in primary =====
- Jonathan Simpson, entrepreneur and infantry officer in the United States Army National Guard

==== Results ====
Republican primary results
Party	Candidate	Votes	%
Republican	Pat Harrigan	27,638	75.6
Republican	Jonathan Simpson	8,909	24.4
Total votes		36,547	100.0

=== General election ===
==== Endorsements ====
Jeff Jackson (D)

Organizations

- Equality North Carolina
- Human Rights Campaign
- League of Conservation Voters Action Fund
- NARAL Pro-Choice America
- North Carolina AFL–CIO
- Sierra Club

==== Predictions ====
Source	Ranking	As of
The Cook Political Report	Solid D (flip)	February 23, 2022
Inside Elections	Solid D (flip)	August 25, 2022
Sabato's Crystal Ball	Safe D (flip)	September 29, 2022
Politico	Likely D (flip)	April 5, 2022
RCP	Likely D (flip)	June 9, 2022
Fox News	Solid D (flip)	October 11, 2022
DDHQ	Likely D (flip)	July 20, 2022
538	Solid D (flip)	September 29, 2022
The Economist	Safe D (flip)	September 28, 2022

==== Results ====
2022 North Carolina's 14th congressional district election
Party	Candidate	Votes	%
Democratic	Jeff Jackson	148,738	57.7
Republican	Pat Harrigan	109,014	42.3
Total votes		257,752	100.0
Democratic win (new seat)			

== Notes ==
Partisan clients
