= Mecklenburg County Democratic Party =

Democratic Party in NC

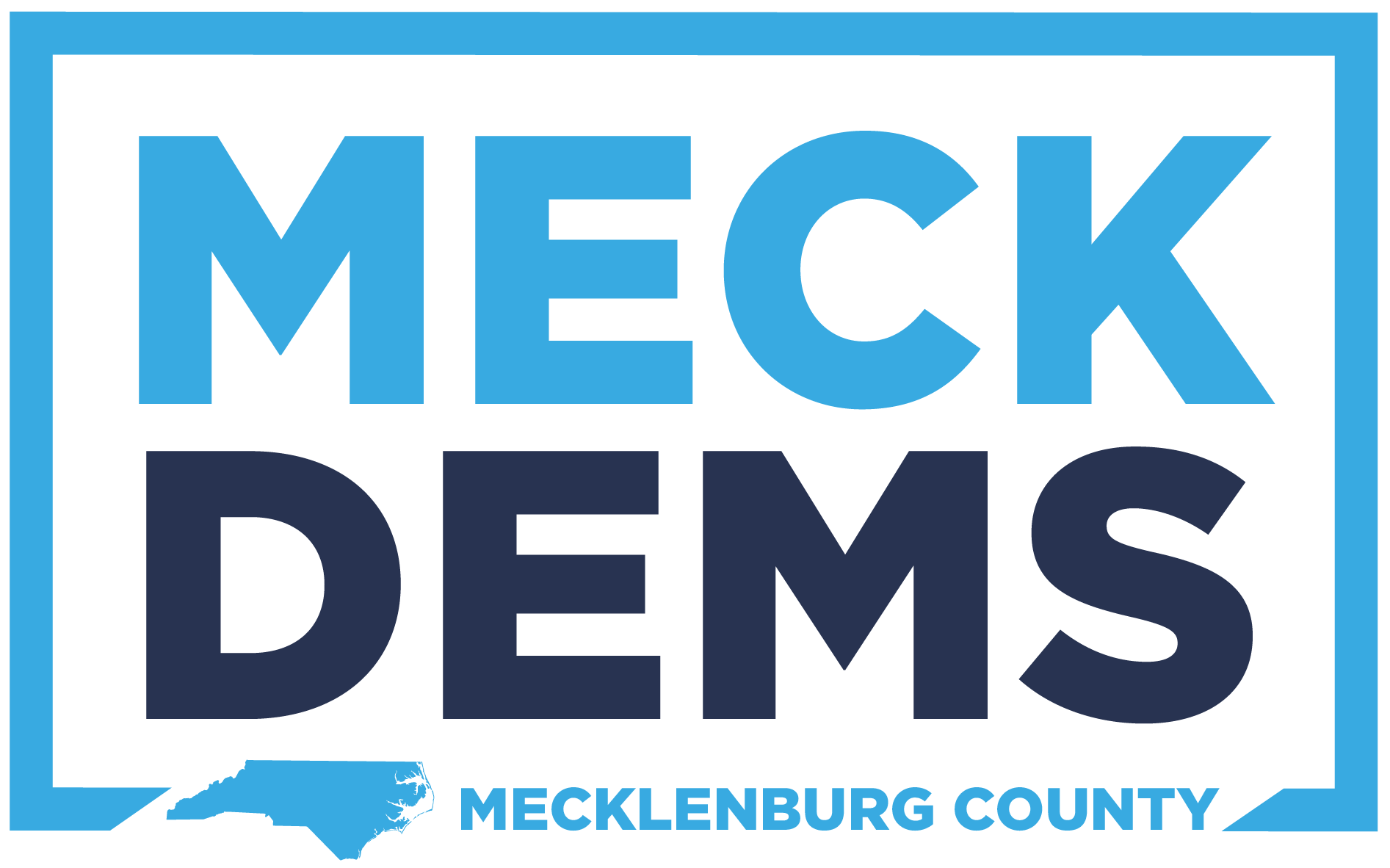
- Chairperson: Wesley Harris
- Mayor: Vi Lyles
- BOCC Chair: George Dunlap
- Headquarters: 725 East Trade Street, Charlotte, NC 28202
- Membership (2024): ▲322,505
- Ideology: Centrism; Modern liberalism Progressivism
- Political position: Center to center-left
- National affiliation: Democratic Party
- Colors: Blue
- Local seats in the North Carolina Senate: 5 / 5
- Local seats in the North Carolina House of Representatives: 12 / 13
- County Commission: 9 / 9
- Charlotte City Council: 9 / 11
- Huntersville Town Board: 7 / 7

Website
- www.meckdems.org

The Mecklenburg County Democratic Party (Meck Dems) is the largest Democratic Party in North Carolina with 322,505 registered Democrats. Meck Dems is the Mecklenburg affiliate of the Democratic Party. It is headquartered at 817 Morehead St, Suite 350, Charlotte, NC.

Mecklenburg is the key to Democrats winning at the state and federal levels. Despite winning a number of local races, Mecklenburg's turnout levels have lagged behind the statewide average, hindering Democratic chances at winning statewide elections. In 2022, Mecklenburg's Democratic turnout was 45% compared to a statewide average of 51% and Wake County’s 58% turnout.

The Party controls all nine seats on the Mecklenburg County Commission and nine of the eleven seats on the Charlotte City Council, as well as the Charlotte mayoral seat.

== Leadership ==
The county party chair is Wesley Harris, who was elected in 2025.The Chair leads the County Executive Committee (the "CEC"), a body of more than 350 Democratic Party leaders and activists from across the county, which governs the Party.

== Recent Electoral Results ==
=== 2024 ===
On April 4, 2024, Vice President Harris visited the Meck Dems Party HQ to officially announce the opening of the first campaign field office in North Carolina. Mecklenburg County is emerging as the key county for Democratic chances of flipping the state blue in 2024.

=== 2023 ===
On April 5, 2023, Mecklenburg state legislator Tricia Cotham announced that she had left the Democratic Party and joined the Republican Party. Cotham's move gave House Republicans a veto-proof majority that allowed them to pass legislation without negotiating with North Carolina's Democratic governor, Roy Cooper. Cotham stated that fellow Democrats had criticized her on Twitter, called her names, and had been "coming after [her] family, coming after [her] children".

Mecklenburg Democrats scored multiple victories in the 2023 general elections, including successfully flipping the entire Huntersville Town Board from red to blue and replacing incumbent mayor Melinda Bales with Christy Clark following a heated campaign. In addition, all three At-Large School Board candidates backed by Meck Dems in the non-partisan race were elected.
