= Julie Eiselt =

American politician (born 1961)

Mayor Pro Tem of the City of Charlotte
- Incumbent
- Assumed office December 4, 2017
- Preceded by: Vi Lyles

Charlotte City Council At-Large
- Incumbent
- Assumed office December 2015

Personal details
- Born: February 17, 1961 (age 65) Elm Grove, Wisconsin, U.S.
- Party: Democratic
- Education: Indiana University Bloomington
- Website: Official website

Julie Eiselt (born February 17, 1961) is the current mayor pro tem of Charlotte, North Carolina, an office she has held since December 4, 2017. Eiselt was elected by her colleagues on the Charlotte City Council to this position at the beginning of her second term. She succeeded Vi Lyles, who took office as Mayor of Charlotte that same day.

Originally from Elm Grove, Wisconsin, Eiselt moved to Charlotte in 1998 after a career in finance and manufacturing, settling in North Carolina with her husband Tom to raise their three children. After she was held at gunpoint in an attempted kidnapping in 2007, Eiselt was motivated to pursue a greater role in civic advocacy, founding Neighbors for a Safer Charlotte to work towards public safety solutions in cooperation with the City and the Charlotte-Mecklenburg Police Department.

Her first run for office in 2015 saw her elected to an at-large seat on the Charlotte City Council that November with more votes than any other candidate, including both of those running for mayor. She was re-elected in 2017, again as the top vote-getter.
