= Charlotte City Council =

Legislative body of Charlotte, North Carolina, US

Type
- Type: Unicameral

Leadership
- Mayor: Rob Harrington (D) since July 1, 2026
- Mayor Pro Tem: James Mitchell (D) since December 1, 2025

Structure
- Seats: 11
- Political groups: Majority: Democratic (10); Minority: Republican (1)

Elections
- Last election: November 4, 2025
- Next election: November 2, 2027

Meeting place
- Charlotte-Mecklenburg Government Center; 600 East Fourth Street

Website
- Website

The Charlotte City Council is the legislative body of the City of Charlotte and forms part of a council–manager system of government. The Council is made up of eleven members and the Mayor, all elected to two-year terms in odd-numbered years. Four Council Members are elected at-large with the other seven representing districts. Though elected separately, the Mayor presides over City Council meetings. A Mayor Pro Tem is elected by the members of the City Council to preside when the Mayor is absent, and to assume the office of Mayor in an acting capacity should the Mayor no longer be able to do so.

== Members ==
Last election: November 2023

District	Council Member	Party	First elected	Notes
At-large	Dimple Ajmera	Democratic	2017	Previously District 5 from appointment in 2017 until 2017 election
At-large	LaWana Slack-Mayfield	Democratic	2022	Previously District 3 from 2011 election until 2019 election
At-large	James (Smuggie) Mitchell	Democratic	2022	Previously District 2 until 2013 election, at-large from 2015 election until resignation in 2021, Mayor Pro Tem
At-large	Victoria Watlington	Democratic	2023	Previously District 3 from 2019 election until 2023 election
1	Danté Anderson	Democratic	2022	
2	Malcolm Graham	Democratic	2019	Previously District 4 from 1999 election until resignation in 2004
3	Joi Mayo	Democratic	2025	
4	Renee Perkins Johnson	Democratic	2019	
5	JD Mazuera Arias	Democratic	2025	
6	Kimberly Owens	Democratic	2025	
7	Ed Driggs	Republican	2013	

== Election results ==
=== 2023 ===
Results by district: Democrats: ≥90%; 70-80%; Republicans: 80-90%; 50-60%

2023 Charlotte City Council At-Large election
Party	Candidate	Votes	%
Democratic	Victoria Waltington	65,580	23.22%
Democratic	Dimple Ajmera (Incumbent)	65,337	23.14%
Democratic	James (Smuggie) Mitchell (Incumbent)	62,783	22.23%
Democratic	LaWana Slack-Mayfield (Incumbent)	60,997	21.60%
Libertarian	Steven J. DiFiore II	23,235	8.23%
Write-in		4,475	1.58%

2023 Charlotte City Council District 1 election
Party	Candidate	Votes	%
Democratic	Dante Anderson (Incumbent)	11,424	97.86%
Write-in		250	2.14%

2023 Charlotte City Council District 2 election
Party	Candidate	Votes	%
Democratic	Malcolm Graham (Incumbent)	8,903	97.71%
Write-in		209	2.29%

2023 Charlotte City Council District 3 election
Party	Candidate	Votes	%
Democratic	Tiawana Deling Brown	6,248	78.52%
Republican	James Harrison Bowers	1,688	21.21%
Write-in		21	0.26%

2023 Charlotte City Council District 4 election
Party	Candidate	Votes	%
Democratic	Renee Perkins Johnson (Incumbent)	8,718	97.88%
Write-in		189	2.12%

2023 Charlotte City Council District 5 election
Party	Candidate	Votes	%
Democratic	Marjorie Molina (Incumbent)	8,099	98.05%
Write-in		161	1.95%

2023 Charlotte City Council District 6 election
Party	Candidate	Votes	%
Republican	Tariq Scott Bokhari (Incumbent)	11,698	50.74%
Democratic	Stephanie Hand	11,346	49.22%
Write-in		9	0.04%

2023 Charlotte City Council District 7 election
Party	Candidate	Votes	%
Republican	Ed Driggs (Incumbent)	9,495	84.94%
Write-in		1,683	15.06%

=== 2022 ===
Results by district: Democrats: ≥90%; 80-90%; 70-80%; Republicans: 80-90%; 50-60%

Initially scheduled for 2021, this election was postponed by state legislation in order to "allow municipalities to consider revising their electoral districts based on new population numbers from the 2020 U.S. Census".

2022 Charlotte City Council At-Large election
Party	Candidate	Votes	%
Democratic	Dimple Ajmera (Incumbent)	46,751	16.57%
Democratic	Braxton Winston II (Incumbent)	46,045	16.32%
Democratic	LaWana Slack-Mayfield	42,582	15.09%
Democratic	James (Smuggie) Mitchell	42,509	15.07%
Republican	Kyle J. Luebke	28,600	10.14%
Republican	David Merrill	25,385	9.00%
Republican	Carrie Olinski	25,000	8.86%
Republican	Charlie Mulligan	24,698	8.75%
Write-in		555	0.20%

2022 Charlotte City Council District 1 election
Party	Candidate	Votes	%
Democratic	Dante Anderson	9,164	95.02%
Write-in		480	4.98%

2022 Charlotte City Council District 2 election
Party	Candidate	Votes	%
Democratic	Malcolm Graham (Incumbent)	6,965	82.02%
Republican	Mary Lineberger Barnett	1,514	17.83%
Write-in		13	0.15%

2022 Charlotte City Council District 3 election
Party	Candidate	Votes	%
Democratic	Victoria Watlington (Incumbent)	5,008	77.18%
Republican	James H. Bowers	1,471	22.67%
Write-in		10	0.15%

2022 Charlotte City Council District 4 election
Party	Candidate	Votes	%
Democratic	Renee Perkins Johnson (Incumbent)	5,986	94.81%
Write-in		328	5.19%

2022 Charlotte City Council District 5 election
Party	Candidate	Votes	%
Democratic	Marjorie Molina	6,136	94.66%
Write-in		346	5.34%

2022 Charlotte City Council District 6 election
Party	Candidate	Votes	%
Republican	Tariq Scott Bokhari (Incumbent)	9,889	50.89%
Democratic	Stephanie Hand	9,532	49.05%
Write-in		13	0.07%

2022 Charlotte City Council District 7 election
Party	Candidate	Votes	%
Republican	Ed Driggs (Incumbent)	9,042	88.82%
Write-in		1,138	11.18%

=== 2019 ===
Results by district: Democrats: ≥90%; 80-90%; Republicans: ≥90%; 50-60%

Charlotte City Council At-Large 2019 General Election
Party	Candidate	Votes	%
Democratic	Julie Eiselt (Incumbent)	67,713	23.88%
Democratic	Braxton Winston II (Incumbent)	62,607	22.08%
Democratic	James (Smuggie) Mitchell (Incumbent)	62,508	22.05%
Democratic	Dimple Ajmera (Incumbent)	56,759	20.02%
Republican	Joshua Richardson	32,167	11.34%
Write-in		1,784	0.63%

Charlotte City Council by District 2019 General Election Results
District	Name	Party	Votes	Percentage
1	Larken Egleston (Incumbent)	Democrat	11,261	97.83%
1	Write-in		250	2.17%
2	Malcolm Graham	Democrat	9,686	84.93%
2	Jacob Robinson	Republican	1,704	14.94%
2	Write-in		15	0.13%
3	Victoria Watlington	Democrat	7,765	98.70%
3	Write-in		102	1.30%
4	Renee Perkins Johnson	Democrat	9,057	80.21%
4	Brandon Pierce	Republican	2,209	19.56%
4	Write-in		26	0.23%
5	Matt Newton (Incumbent)	Democrat	7,366	98.63%
5	Write-in		102	1.37%
6	Tariq Scott Bokhari (Incumbent)	Republican	11,163	58.79%
6	Gina Navarrete	Democrat	7,806	41.11%
6	Write-in		18	0.09%
7	Ed Driggs (Incumbent)	Republican	10,482	93.74%
7	Write-in		700	6.26%

=== 2017 ===
Charlotte City Council At-Large 2017 General Election Results
Name	Party	Total Votes	Percentage of all Votes	Result
Julie Eiselt	Democrat	73,348	17.29%	Elected
Braxton Winston II	Democrat	70,030	16.51%	Elected
James (Smuggie) Mitchell	Democrat	69,777	16.45%	Elected
Dimple Ajmera	Democrat	61,882	14.59%	Elected
John K. Powell, Jr.	Republican	48,277	11.38%	Defeated
Parker Cains	Republican	44,068	10.39%	Defeated
David Michael Rice	Republican	34,733	8.19%	Defeated
Steven J. DiFiori II	Libertarian	21,514	5.07%	Defeated
Write-in	Write-in	635	0.15%	Defeated

Charlotte City Council by District 2017 General Election Results
District	Name	Party	Total Votes	Percentage of All Votes in District	Result
1	Larken Egleston	Democrat	13,830	98.11%	Elected
1	Write-In	Write-In	266	1.89%	Defeated
2	Justin Harlow	Democrat	12,081	80.41%	Elected
2	Pete Givens	Republican	2,920	19.44%	Defeated
2	Write-In	Write-In	23	0.15%	Defeated
3	LaWana Mayfield	Democrat	9,276	73.26%	Elected
3	Daniel Herrera	Republican	3,375	26.65%	Defeated
3	Write-In	Write-In	11	0.09%	Defeated
4	Greg Phipps	Democrat	12,159	98.18%	Elected
4	Write-In	Write-In	221	1.78%	Defeated
4	Ken Canavan	Write-In	5	0.04%	Defeated
5	Matt Newton	Democrat	9,398	97.58%	Elected
5	Write-In	Write-In	233	2.42%	Defeated
6	Tariq Scott Bokhari	Republican	15,383	62.51%	Elected
6	Sam Grundman	Democrat	7,899	32.10%	Defeated
6	Jeff Scott	Libertarian	1,301	5.29%	Defeated
6	Write-In	Write-In	24	0.10%	Defeated
7	Ed Driggs	Republican	13,152	62.00%	Elected
7	Sharon Roberts	Democrat	8,049	37.94%	Defeated
7	Write-In	Write-In	12	0.06%	Defeated

Charlotte City Council by District 2017 Primary Run Off Election Results
District	Name	Party	Total Votes	Percentage of All Votes in District	Result
5	Matt Newton	Democrat	970	57.09%	Elected
5	Darrell Bonapart	Democrat	729	42.91%	Defeated

Charlotte City Council by District 2017 Primary Election Results
District	Name	Party	Total Votes	Percentage of All Votes in District	Result
1	Larken Egleston	Democrat	3,281	49.58%	Elected
1	Patsy Kinsey	Democrat	2,849	43.06%	Defeated
1	Robert Mitchell	Democrat	487	7.36%	Defeated

=== 2015 ===
Charlotte City Council At-Large 2015 General Election Results
Name	Party	Total Votes	Percentage of all Votes	Result
Julie Eiselt	Democrat	44,363	16.98%	Elected
Vi Lyles	Democrat	42,752	16.36%	Elected
Claire Green Fallon	Democrat	41,304	15.81%	Elected
James (Smuggie) Mitchell	Democrat	37,358	14.30%	Elected
John K. Powell, Jr.	Republican	37,106	14.20%	Defeated
Pablo Carvajal	Republican	30,471	11.66%	Defeated
David Michael Rice	Republican	27,205	10.41%	Defeated
Write-in	Write-in	761	0.29%	Defeated

Charlotte City Council by District 2015 General Election Results
District	Name	Party	Total Votes	Percentage of All Votes in District	Result
1	Patsy Kinsey	Democrat	7,730	93.35%	Elected
1	Write-In	Write-In	551	6.65%	Defeated
2	Al Austin	Democrat	7,183	79.56%	Elected
2	Justin Dunn	Republican	1,839	20.37%	Defeated
2	Write-In	Write-In	6	0.07%	Defeated
3	LaWana Mayfield	Democrat	5,320	76.12%	Elected
3	Eric Wayne Netter	Republican	1,655	23.68%	Defeated
3	Write-In	Write-In	14	0.20%	Defeated
4	Greg Phipps	Democrat	6,254	71.53%	Elected
4	Michael P. O'Hara	Republican	2,480	28.37%	Defeated
4	Write-In	Write-In	9	0.10%	Defeated
5	John Autry	Democrat	5,686	98.80%	Elected
5	Write-In	Write-In	69	1.20%	Defeated
6	Kenny Smith	Republican	12,017	97.88%	Elected
6	Write-In	Write-In	260	2.12%	Defeated
7	Ed Driggs	Republican	9,767	68.75%	Elected
7	Chris Turner	Democrat	4,433	31.20%	Defeated
7	Write-In	Write-In	7	0.05%	Defeated

=== 2013 ===
Charlotte City Council At-Large 2013 General Election Results
Name	Party	Straight Party Votes	Direct Votes	Direct Votes Percentage of Total Votes	Total Votes	Percentage of all Votes	Result
Michael D. Barnes	Democrat	26,827	28,009	51.08%	54,836	15.32%	Elected
Vi Alexander Lyles	Democrat	26,827	26,900	50.07%	53,727	15.01%	Elected
David Howard	Democrat	26,827	25,945	49.16%	52,772	14.74%	Elected
Claire Green Fallon	Democrat	26,827	20,469	43.28%	47,296	13.21%	Elected
Ken Harris, Jr.	Republican	15,114	26,648	63.81%	41,762	11.67%	Defeated
Vanessa Faura	Republican	15,114	18,802	55.44%	33,916	9.48%	Defeated
Dennis Peterson	Republican	15,114	17,966	54.31%	33,080	9.24%	Defeated
Mark Frietch	Republican	15,114	17,596	53.79%	32,710	9.14%	Defeated
Eric A. Cable	Libertarian	191	7,411	97.49%	7,602	2.12%	Defeated
Write-in	Write-in	n/a	239	100.00%	239	0.07%	Defeated

Charlotte City Council by District 2013 General Election Results
District	Name	Party	Total Votes	Percentage of All Votes in District	Result
1	Patsy Kinsey	Democrat	9,912	97.70%	Elected
1	Lee Sowers	Write-in	39	0.38%	Defeated
1	Write-in Miscellaneous	Write-in	194	1.91%	Defeated
2	Alvin (Al) Austin	Democrat	9,979	80.17%	Elected
2	Darryl Broome	Republican	2,459	19.75%	Defeated
2	Write-in Miscellaneous	Write-in	10	0.08%	Defeated
3	LaWana Mayfield	Democrat	7,541	77.43%	Elected
3	C. Travis Wheat	Libertarian	444	4.56%	Defeated
3	Eric Netter	Republican	1,733	17.79%	Defeated
3	Write-in Miscellaneous	Write-in	21	0.22%	Defeated
4	Greg Phipps	Democrat	7,429	66.89%	Elected
4	Michael Zytkow	Independent	3,653	32.89%	Defeated
4	Write-in Miscellaneous	Write-in	24	0.22%	Defeated
5	John Autry	Democrat	8,111	98.83%	Elected
5	Write-in Miscellaneous	Write-in	96	1.17%	Defeated
6	Kenny Smith	Republican	15,004	98.33%	Elected
6	Kate Payerle	Write-in	14	0.09%	Defeated
6	Doug Wrona	Write-in	8	0.05%	Defeated
6	Write-in Miscellaneous	Write-in	233	1.53%	Defeated
7	Ed Driggs	Republican	11,319	71.91%	Elected
7	Nakari Burton	Democrat	4,411	28.02%	Defeated
7	Write-in Miscellaneous	Write-in	10	0.06%	Defeated

== See also ==
- Mayor of Charlotte, North Carolina
