= Park Avenue station (Charlotte) =

Former heritage streetcar station in Charlotte, North Carolina

Park Avenue

General information
- Location: Park Avenue; Charlotte, North Carolina; United States
- Coordinates: 35°12′51.4″N 80°51′25.4″W
- Owner: Charlotte Area Transit System

Construction
- Structure type: At-grade

History
- Opened: August 30, 1996
- Closed: February 6, 2006

Former services
Preceding station	CATS	Following station
East/West Boulevard toward Atherton Mill	Charlotte Trolley	Bland Street toward 9th Street
Location

Park Avenue was a heritage streetcar station in Charlotte, North Carolina. The former at-grade side platform, which was located next to Park Avenue, was a stop for the Charlotte Trolley in South End and nearby Dilworth neighborhood.

== History ==
The station began operations on August 30, 1996. Consisting of a platform area along the track, the station operated Thursday through Sunday and then daily on June 28, 2004. After nearly a decade of service, the station was permanently closed on February 6, 2006.The relocation of Bland Street and the already close proximity of East/West Boulevard made Park Avenue redundant and thus unnecessary. By end of 2006, the side platform and structure was razed; what remains at the former location are some brick and concrete foundation and a stone pattern walkway connecting to Park Avenue.
