= Carson station (Charlotte) =

Light rail station in Charlotte, North Carolina

Carson
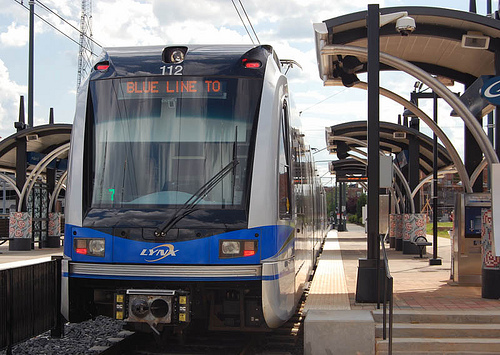

General information
- Location: 218 East Carson Boulevard; Charlotte, North Carolina; United States
- Coordinates: 35°13′8″N 80°51′3″W
- Owner: Charlotte Area Transit Systems
- Platforms: 2 side platforms
- Tracks: 2

Construction
- Structure type: At-grade
- Cycle facilities: Bicycle racks
- Accessible: yes
- Architect: Ralph Whitehead Associates
- Architectural style: Postmodern

History
- Opened: November 24, 2007

Services
Preceding station	CATS	Following station
Bland Street toward I-485/South Boulevard	Lynx Blue Line	Brooklyn Village toward UNC Charlotte–Main
Former services
Preceding station	CATS	Following station
Bland Street toward Atherton Mill	Charlotte Trolley	Morehead toward 9th Street
Location

Carson is a light rail station in Charlotte, North Carolina. The at-grade dual side platforms are a stop along the Lynx Blue Line and serves the South End neighborhood.

== Location ==
The station is located next to Carson Boulevard and is accessible by sidewalk and the Charlotte Rail Trail. The immediate area features multi-level apartments and offices, with the Arlington (the pink building) and Dowd YMCA located nearby.

== History ==
The station officially opened for service on Saturday, November 24, 2007, and as part of its opening celebration fares were not collected. Regular service with fare collection commenced on Monday, November 26, 2007.

== Station layout ==
The station consists of two side platforms, both of which includes a low-level area for heritage streetcars, and six covered waiting areas; other amenities include ticket vending machines, emergency call box, and bicycle racks. The station also features several art installations including a drinking fountain basin designed to look like dogwood, the North Carolina state flower, by Nancy Blum. Bas-reliefs entitled Hornbeam, by Alice Adams. Gold nugget motifs on both the pavers and shelters, which pay homage to the mid-19th century North Carolina gold rush, by Leticia Huerta; and track fencing with magnolia leaves, by Shaun Cassidy.
