= Bland Street station =

Light rail station in Charlotte, North Carolina, USA

Bland Street
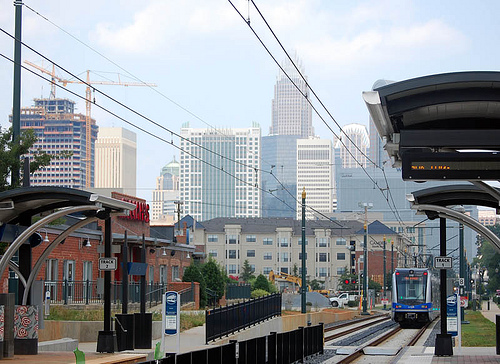
- Looking north from the Bland Street station

General information
- Location: 1511 Camden Road; Charlotte, North Carolina
- Coordinates: 35°12′57″N 80°51′19″W
- Owner: Charlotte Area Transit Systems
- Platforms: 2 side platforms
- Tracks: 2

Construction
- Structure type: At-grade
- Cycle facilities: Bicycle racks
- Accessible: yes
- Architect: Ralph Whitehead Associates
- Architectural style: Postmodern

History
- Opened: August 30, 1996
- Rebuilt: November 24, 2007

Services
Preceding station	CATS	Following station
East/West Boulevard toward I-485/South Boulevard	Lynx Blue Line	Carson toward UNC Charlotte–Main
Former services
Preceding station	CATS	Following station
Park Avenue Before 2007 toward Atherton Mill	Charlotte Trolley	Morehead Before 2007 toward 9th Street
East/West Boulevard After 2007 toward Atherton Mill	Charlotte Trolley	Carson After 2007 toward 9th Street
Location

Bland Street is a light rail station in Charlotte, North Carolina, United States. The at-grade dual side platforms are a stop along the Lynx Blue Line and serves South End and nearby Dilworth neighborhood.

== Location ==
The station is located one block south of Bland Street and is accessible by sidewalk, the Charlotte Rail Trail, and a walkway (formally Rensselaer Avenue) that connects to nearby Camden Road and South Boulevard. The immediate area features multi-level apartments and offices, as well as restaurants, bars, and art galleries.

== History ==
The station began as a heritage streetcar stop, for the Charlotte Trolley, on August 30, 1996. Consisting of a platform area along a single track, the station operated Thursday through Sunday and then daily on June 28, 2004. Service was temporarily halted on February 5, 2006 so that the station could be double-tracked and reconstructed for light rail service. During reconstruction, the new Bland Street station was position further south where Rensselaear Avenue formally crossed and the original side platform was razed; a power box currently stands at its former location. The station resumed operations on November 24, 2007, as stop along the Lynx Blue Line; this was followed by the resumption of the Charlotte Trolley on April 20, 2008, operating on a limited schedule. On June 28, 2010 the Charlotte Trolley ended service, leaving the Lynx Blue Line as its sole service at the station.

== Station layout ==
The station consists of two side platforms, both of which includes a low-level area for heritage streetcars, and six covered waiting areas; other amenities include ticket vending machines, emergency call box, and bicycle racks. The station also features several art installations including a drinking fountain basin designed to look like dogwood, the North Carolina state flower, by Nancy Blum. Bas-reliefs entitled Hornbeam, by Alice Adams. Rose motifs on both the pavers and shelters, by Leticia Huerta. River stone benches, by Hoss Haley, and track fencing with pin oak leaves, by Shaun Cassidy.
