= Morehead station =

Former heritage streetcar station in Charlotte, North Carolina, USA

Morehead
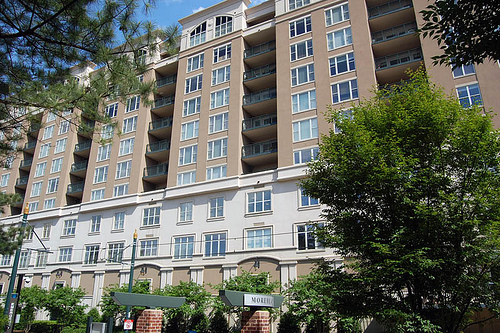

General information
- Location: East Morehead Street; Charlotte, NC 28203
- Coordinates: 35°13′11.34″N 80°50′58.14″W
- Owner: Charlotte Area Transit Systems
- Platforms: 2 side platforms
- Tracks: 2

Construction
- Structure type: At-grade
- Cycle facilities: Bicycle racks

History
- Opened: August 30, 1996
- Closed: June 28, 2010

Former services
Preceding station	CATS	Following station
Bland Street Before 2007 toward Atherton Mill	Charlotte Trolley	Stonewall toward 9th Street
Carson After 2007 toward Atherton Mill	Charlotte Trolley	Stonewall toward 9th Street
Location

Morehead was a heritage streetcar station in Charlotte, North Carolina. The at-grade side platforms, located below Morehead Street, was a stop for the Charlotte Trolley in the South End neighborhood.

== History ==
The station began operations on August 30, 1996. Consisting of a platform area along the track, the station operated Thursday through Sunday and then daily on June 28, 2004. Service was temporarily halted on February 5, 2006; during which time the station was double-tracked and was rebuilt with signage and an emergency call box. When the station resumed on April 20, 2008, it operated on a limited schedule. When the Charlotte Trolley ended service on June 28, 2010, the Morehead station, along with three other trolley only stations, ceased operations. Being located within the Lynx Blue Line's right-of-way, the station's platform area has remained unchanged and is accessible along the Charlotte Rail Trail, with nearby stairs and walkway to Morehead Street.
