= Tremont station (Charlotte) =

Former heritage streetcar station in Charlotte, North Carolina

Tremont
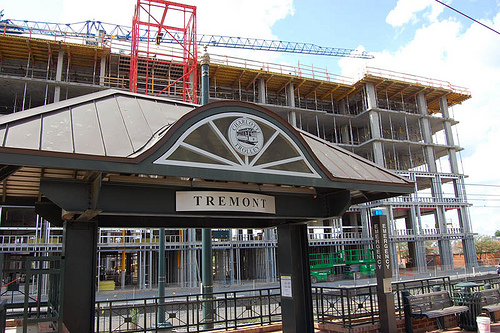
- The former Tremont station in 2008

General information
- Location: 2006 South Boulevard; Charlotte, North Carolina; United States
- Coordinates: 35°12′38.26″N 80°51′37.23″W
- Owner: Charlotte Area Transit Systems
- Platforms: 1 side platform
- Tracks: 1

Construction
- Structure type: At-grade
- Cycle facilities: Bicycle racks
- Accessible: Yes

History
- Opened: August 30, 1996
- Closed: June 28, 2010

Former services
Preceding station	CATS	Following station
Atherton Mill Terminus	Charlotte Trolley	East/West Boulevard toward 9th Street
Location

Tremont was a heritage streetcar station in Charlotte, North Carolina. The at-grade side platform, located near Tremont Avenue, was a stop for the Charlotte Trolley in the South End neighborhood.

== History ==
The station began operations on August 30, 1996. Consisting of a platform area along the track, the station operated Thursday through Sunday and then daily on June 28, 2004. Service was temporarily halted on February 5, 2006; during which time the station was rebuilt with an emergency call box, ramp, and shelter. When the station resumed on April 20, 2008, it operated on a limited schedule. When the Charlotte Trolley ended service on June 28, 2010, the Tremont station, along with three other trolley only stations, ceased operations. Being located within the Lynx Blue Line's right-of-way, the station's platform and shelter have remained unchanged; with the location being used for trainspotting and gathering place.
