= East/West Boulevard station =

Light rail station in Charlotte, North Carolina

East/West Blvd.
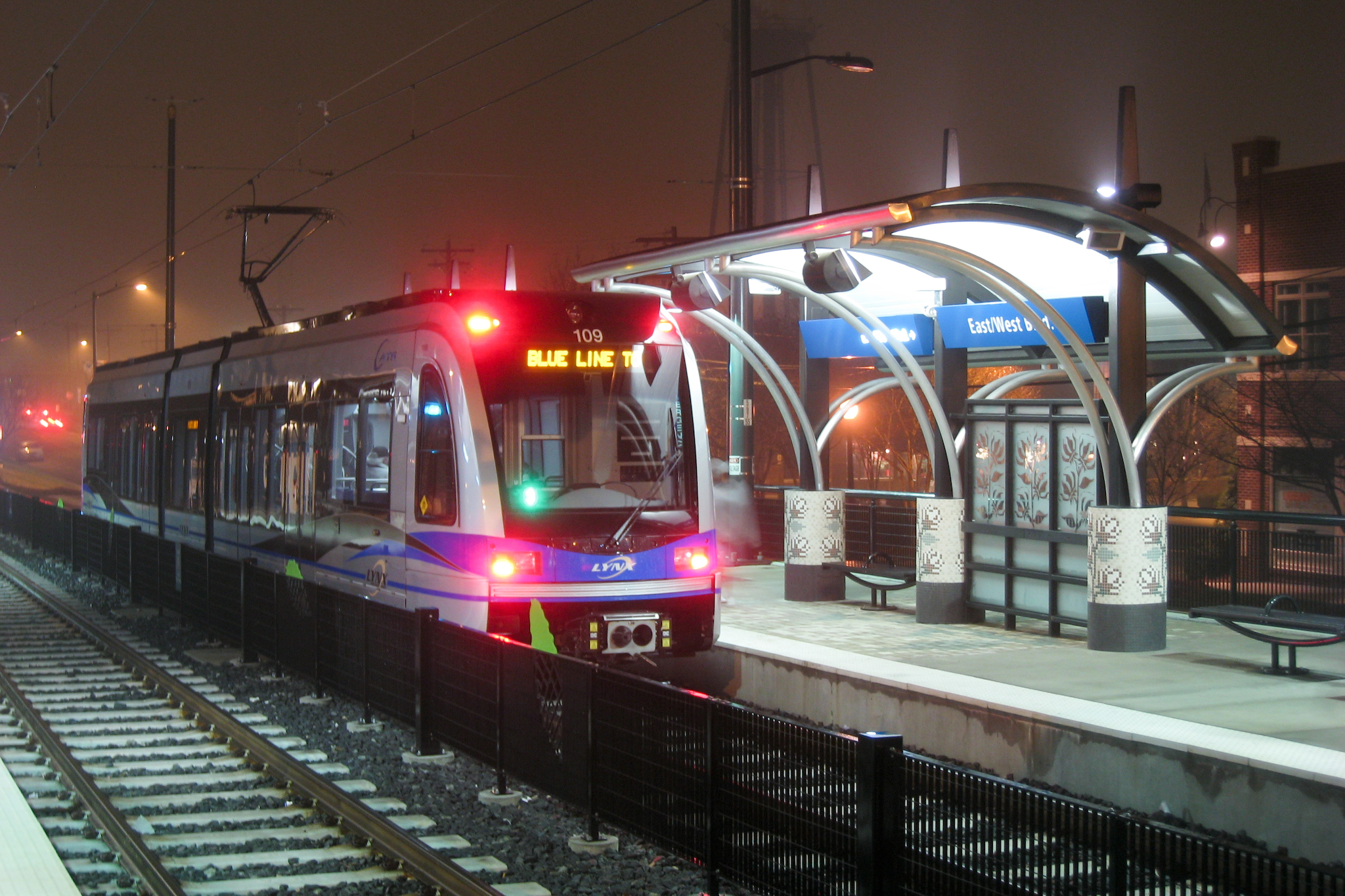
- Southbound train leaving the platform

General information
- Location: 1821 Camden Road; Charlotte, North Carolina; United States
- Coordinates: 35°12′43″N 80°51′33″W
- Owner: Charlotte Area Transit Systems
- Platforms: 2 side platforms
- Tracks: 2
- Connections: CATS: 10, 25

Construction
- Structure type: At-grade
- Cycle facilities: Bicycle racks
- Accessible: yes
- Architect: Ralph Whitehead Associates
- Architectural style: Postmodern

History
- Opened: August 30, 1996
- Rebuilt: November 24, 2007

Services
Preceding station	CATS	Following station
New Bern toward I-485/South Boulevard	Lynx Blue Line	Bland Street toward UNC Charlotte–Main
Former services
Preceding station	CATS	Following station
Tremont toward Atherton Mill	Charlotte Trolley	Park Avenue Before 2007 toward 9th Street
Tremont toward Atherton Mill	Charlotte Trolley	Bland Street After 2007 toward 9th Street
Location

East/West Boulevard is a light rail station in Charlotte, North Carolina. The at-grade dual side platforms are a stop along the Lynx Blue Line and serves South End and nearby Dilworth and Wilmore neighborhoods.

== Location ==
The station is located at the intersection where East Boulevard becomes West Boulevard upon crossing Camden Road and is accessible by sidewalk and the Charlotte Rail Trail. The immediate area features multi-level apartments and offices, including The Line and Lowe's Global Technology Center. The area is also notable for the number of renovated factories and eclectic mix of retail, restaurants, and bars. Also nearby is Atherton Mill and Wilmore Centennial Park.

== History ==
The station began as a heritage streetcar stop, for the Charlotte Trolley, on August 30, 1996. Consisting of a platform area along a single track, the station operated Thursday through Sunday and then daily on June 28, 2004. Service was temporarily halted on February 5, 2006, so that the station could be double-tracked and reconstructed for light rail service. The station resumed operations on November 24, 2007, as stop along the Lynx Blue Line; this was followed by the resumption of the Charlotte Trolley on April 20, 2008, operating on a limited schedule. On June 28, 2010, the Charlotte Trolley ended service, leaving the Lynx Blue Line as its sole service at the station.

On August 22, 2025, 23-year-old Ukrainian refugee Iryna Zarutska was stabbed and killed on the Lynx Blue Line train at the station. A candlelight vigil was held on September 22 at the station, to mark one month since Zarutska's death.

== Station layout ==
The station consists of two side platforms, both of which includes a low-level area for heritage streetcars, and six covered waiting areas; other amenities include ticket vending machines, emergency call box, and bicycle racks. The station also features several art installations including a drinking fountain basin designed to look like dogwood, the North Carolina state flower, by Nancy Blum. Bas-reliefs entitled Hornbeam, by Alice Adams. Cotton plant motifs on both the pavers and shelters, by Leticia Huerta. A 360-foot (110 m) mosaic along a wall facing Camden Road, by Thomas Thoune, and track fencing featuring beech leaves, by Shaun Cassidy.
