= Design District =

Design District may refer to:

- Calgary Design District
- Design District (Charlotte)
- Design District, Dallas
- Miami Design District
- Orlando Design District
- San Francisco's Design District
