= Charlotte Convention Center =

Convention center in Charlotte, North Carolina

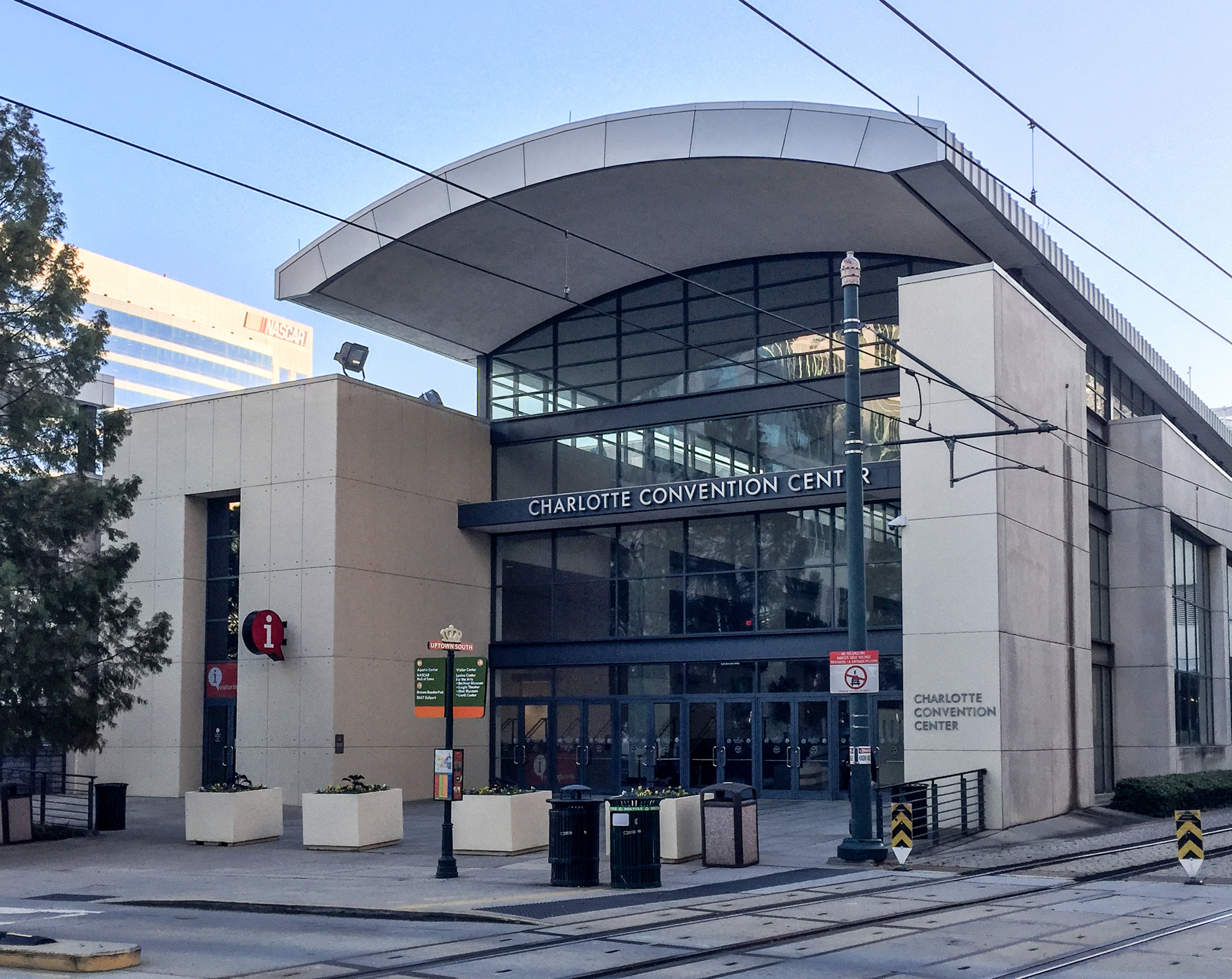
- Entrance to the Charlotte Convention Center (2017)
- Interactive map of Charlotte Convention Center
- Address: 501 South College Street; Charlotte, North Carolina; 28202
- Coordinates: 35°13′21″N 80°50′44″W
- Public transit: 3rd Street/CC; Brooklyn Village

Construction
- Opened: 1995

Website
- www.charlotteconventionctr.com

The Charlotte Convention Center is a convention center located in Charlotte, North Carolina. It opened in 1995 and attracts more than half a million visitors each year. It was designed by Thompson, Ventulett, Stainback & Associates.

It has 280,000 square feet (26,000 m^{2}) of contiguous exhibit space. The Crown ballroom spans 40,000 square feet (3,700 m^{2}), and holds between 2,400 and 4,200 people. The Richardson ballroom spans 35,000 square feet (3,300 m^{2}), depending on setting can hold 1,748 to 3,500 people. Pre-function areas extend the ballroom space by 15,000 square feet (1,400 m^{2}). There is also more than 70,000 square feet (7,000 m^{2}) of flexible meeting space in 50 rooms.

The LYNX and the now defunct Charlotte Trolley lines pass straight through the center of the convention center. The convention center was recently expanded to include an additional ballroom since the NASCAR Hall of Fame is connected to the convention center.

== Expansion ==
In April 2017, the Charlotte Regional Visitors Authority announced a $110-million expansion to the convention center. The expansion will increase the meeting space by 50,000 square feet and add a bridge for pedestrians linking the center to the Westin Hotel nearby. The project was expected to start construction in early 2019. The expansion was completed in October 2021
