= 110 East =

Coordinates: 35°12′43″N 80°51′32″W

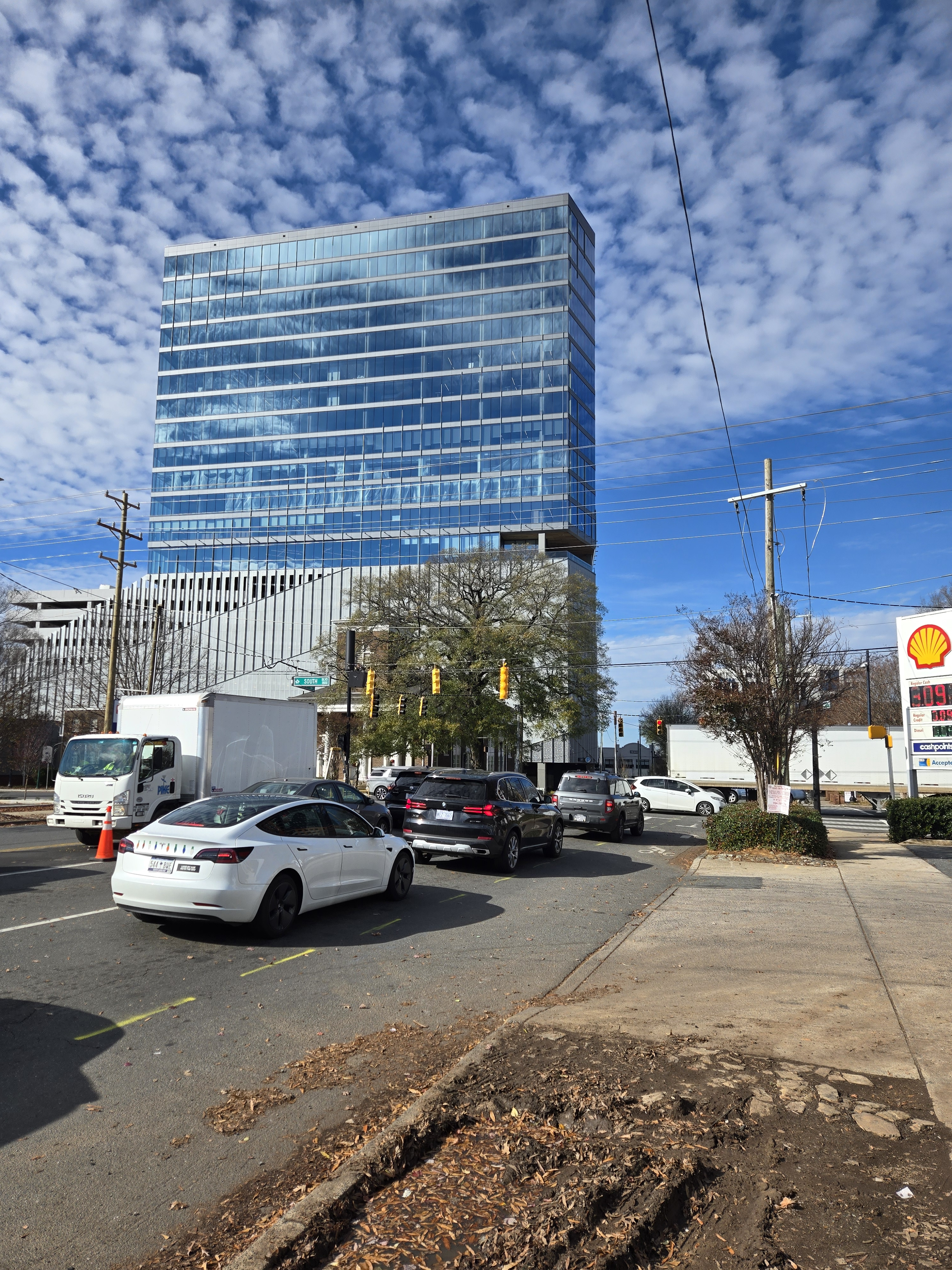
- The building just after delivering in December 2025
- Interactive map of the 110 East area

General information
- Status: Completed
- Type: Office
- Location: 110 East Boulevard; Charlotte, North Carolina
- Construction started: January 2022
- Opening: March 2024
- Cost: $186 million
- Owner: Shorenstein Company, LP; Stiles
- Landlord: Trinity Partners

Height
- Roof: 305 feet (93 m)

Technical details
- Floor count: 23
- Floor area: 370,000 sq ft (34,000 m^{2})
- Lifts/elevators: 6

Design and construction
- Architect: Hastings Architecture Associates
- Developer: Shorenstein Company, LP; Stiles

Other information
- Parking: 9 floors, 914 spots
- Public transit access: East/West Boulevard station

Website
- https://www.110east.com/

110 East is a 305-foot (93 m) tall 23 story office building in Charlotte, North Carolina.

== History ==
The 2-acre site made up of 2 parcels was purchased by Stiles Corp. and Shorenstein Properties in October for $21.5 million. The site is right next to the East/West Boulevard station light rail station. It will be the only office building in Charlotte with direct light rail access. The building's architect, Hastings Architecture, coordinated with Charlotte Area Transit System to ensure a seamless transition between the building and the light rail station. It will be in a very active area of the South End neighborhood that has a lot of restaurants and nightlife within a short walk. The former parking lot was used for parking for the buildings in front of it that housed restaurants Tupelo Honey and The Manchester. The two buildings were included in the $21.5 million purchase. Tupelo Honey has relocated and The Manchester closed prior to the start of construction.

It was originally planned to break ground in mid 2020 and complete in the fall of 2022. However, due to the COVID-19 pandemic this was pushed back. On January 12 the Stiles website announced the groundbreaking for January 26, 2022.

The building will feature a total of 370,000 square feet (34,374 m^{2}) of Class A space. with 7,000 square feet (650 m^{2}) of street level retail space. Due to the size of the lot floors 2 to 10 will be devoted to a 914-space parking deck. The 11th floor will feature 8,000 square feet (743 m^{2}) of amenities such as a 4,000 square feet (372 m^{2}) fitness center, flexible conference spaces, and a terrace along with a sky lobby. Floors 12 to 23 will be office space with 29,000 square feet (2,694 m^{2}) floorplates. The Hastings Architecture websites states that the interior of the building design uses art to guide building tenants throughout the space and attempts to maximize the Uptown skyline views. The building is currently pursuing LEED Silver and Wired Certification. The building is a speculative building, meaning no tenants had signed prior to the building breaking ground. Although Cushman & Wakefield, the company leasing the building, has indicated that several companies have called about the space and have toured the city. The building officially topped out in August 2023. Also, during the same time period, Cushman & Wakefield says leasing interest in the building is picking up. However, no leases have been signed yet. The building delivered in April 2024 without any tenants.

However, in November 2024 the building signed its first tenant. Patterson Pope will occupy 6,565 square feet (610 m^{2}) on the twelfth floor. The company will be moved from 3001 N. Graham St. In May 2025 SouthState Bank announced it will lease 40,000 square feet (3,716 m^{2}) in the building to house 100 employees. SouthState is the third tenant and the deal brought the building's occupancy to 16%. In June 2025 it was announced that Coinbase, the nation's largest crypto exchange, will leasing 58,600 square feet (5,444 m^{2}), occupying floors 18 and 19. The company will be hiring 130 local employees. This announcement brings the building's occupancy to 36%. In August 2025 Michigan-based Spar Group Inc. announced that in October 2025 it will be relocating its corporate headquarters to the building. The company will be occupying 16,000 square feet (1,486 m^{2}) to house 75 employees. The new lease brings the building to 37% leased.

In August 2025 it was announced that Memphis, Tennessee-based First Horizon Corp will be leasing 88,167 square feet (8,191 m^{2}) across the top three floors of building. This move will consolidate all of their Charlotte offices. The company will anchor the building upon moving in which will occur in the first half of 2026. This lease brings the building's occupancy to 70%.

In October 2025 the tower announced several new leases. Law firm Bradley Arant Boult Cummings will be leasing 41,851 square feet (3,888 m^{2}) across two floors. The company plans to relocate its 59 local employees to the building in early 2027. Aon will be leasing 13,254 square feet (1,231 m^{2}) on the 17th floor. These new leases bring the building to 81%. In 2025 Trinity Partners, the leasing agency, has secured deals for 300,000 square feet (27,871 m^{2}) of leased space.

In February 2026 Charles Schwab Corp. announced it will be leasing 58,700 square feet (5,453 m^{2}) in the building. The company currently leases an entire two building in SouthPark at 4529 Sharon Road, which contains 43,000 square feet (3,995 m^{2}). The company's possible building move in date in fall 2026. With this lease the building is 95% leased.

== See also ==
- List of tallest buildings in Charlotte
- List of tallest buildings in North Carolina
- List of tallest buildings in the United States
