= Sedgefield (disambiguation) =

Places named Sedgefield include:

- Sedgefield — a town in County Durham, England
- Sedgefield (borough) — a former local government district and borough in County Durham, in north-east England
- Sedgefield (UK Parliament constituency) — a constituency represented in the House of Commons of the Parliament of the United Kingdom
- Sedgefield, Western Cape — a coastal town in South Africa about halfway between the towns Knysna and George
- Sedgefield (Charlotte neighborhood), a neighborhood in Charlotte, NC
- Sedgefield, North Carolina, a populated place
