= The Ellis =

Residential building in Charlotte, NC

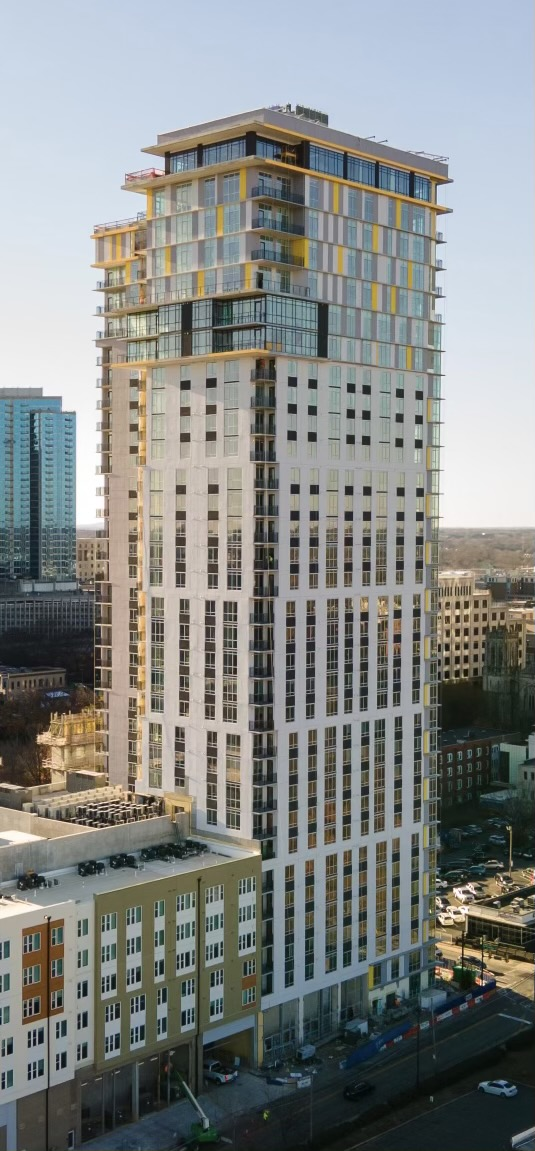
- Interactive map of the The Ellis area

General information
- Type: Residential
- Location: 512 N College Street; Charlotte, North Carolina
- Coordinates: 35°13′47″N 80°50′12″W
- Construction started: April 2019
- Opening: June 2021
- Owner: Lennar

Height
- Roof: 117 m (384 ft)

Technical details
- Floor count: 33

Design and construction
- Developer: Lennar

Other information
- Parking: On site parking garage
- Public transit: 9th Street

The Ellis is a high-rise residential building in Uptown Charlotte, North Carolina. Construction was completed on June 23, 2021. The building was developed by Lennar and it is located between Eight and Ninth Streets on N College St fronting the Lynx Blue Line.

The 3.5-acre lot was purchased from Levine Properties in 2017 for $23 million. Previously the property was a surface parking lot. It aligns with the ongoing project the North Tryon Vision which is working to revitalize a 50-square-block area of North Tryon St, although the project is officially not part of the North Tryon Vision since it is located on North College Street.

== Apartment building ==
It consists of 549 apartments in two sections of the building. The primary section is a 6-story low-rise tower with 184 units and the other is a 33-story tower with height of 384 feet, it contains 365 units. The low-rise section has a more eclectic and relaxed feel with rent starting at $1,200 for a studio apartment. The high-rise is more expansive and has refined modern spaces with rents starting at $1,500. 19,000 of ground level retail will also be included in the building. When it was completed it was one of the tallest multifamily buildings in the Charlotte area.

The Ellis ran into a number of challenges during construction. The development fills up almost the entire lot so materials could not lay around for very long. This required a lot of coordination with vendors. Also the building was built during the COVID-19 pandemic which caused a lot of cases of virus transmission among construction workers. The Charlotte Commercial Construction Group developed safety protocols for the Charlotte team to prevent the spread of the virus and allow construction work to safely continue. Part of these protocols were nightly cleanings of the construction site and daily worker health screenings.

Behind the development will be a private street called Ellis Lane which will front the Charlotte Rail Trail. This street will be used for farmer's markets, food trucks, and "Small Business Saturdays". Other amenities include work from home space, a fitness center, a salt water pool, and a bar overlooking First Ward Park.

A number of organizations are excited to see this building complete Michael Smith, president of Center City Partners, said this "This is a big move as we continue to transform the North Tryon district from many surface lots into a treasured TOD neighborhood". Charles Bowman, North Carolina market president of Bank of America, added "All of you who are a part of it or are going to be a part of it, thank you — if you’re not part of it yet, find another project, bring some capital to town and we’ll put it to work for you". Bank of America and Center City Partners, along a number of other organizations, are a part of the North Tryon Vision.

== Homewood Suites Uptown ==
In early 2018 Concord Hospitality paid $3 million for a .4-acre site at the corner of North College and East Eighth streets. As part of the Ellis project the first Homewood Suites in Uptown Charlotte was being built. It is a 13-story upscale extended stay hotel with 211 suites. The hotel will also have 4,00 square feet of ground floor retail, 3,500 square of flexible meeting space, a fitness center, pool, and lounge. The project is being developed by Concord Hospitality Enterprises Company and Charlotte-based Levine Properties. Other Charlotte area properties of Concord Hospitality include the AC Hotel in Ballantyne, Homewood Suites Charlotte Airport, and Kingsley's Courtyard by Marriott Charlotte Fort Mill. As of July 2023 Concord was in the midst of hiring housekeeping, reception, security and maintenance in order to open the hotel in August 2023.

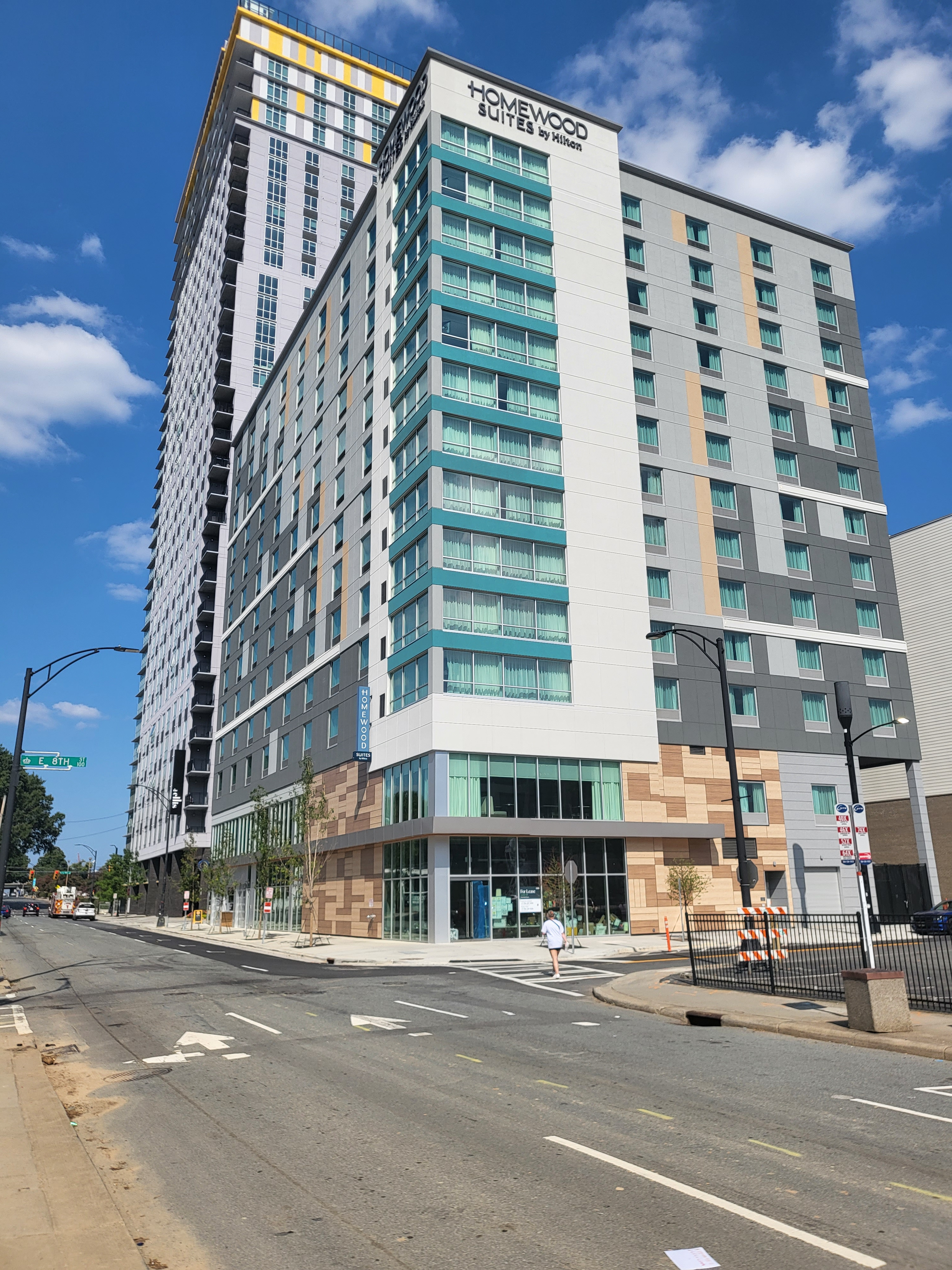
The finished building in August 2023, a few weeks after the hotel opened.

== See also ==
- List of tallest buildings in Charlotte
- List of tallest buildings in North Carolina
