= Brooklyn Village station =

Light rail station in Charlotte, North Carolina, USA

Brooklyn Village
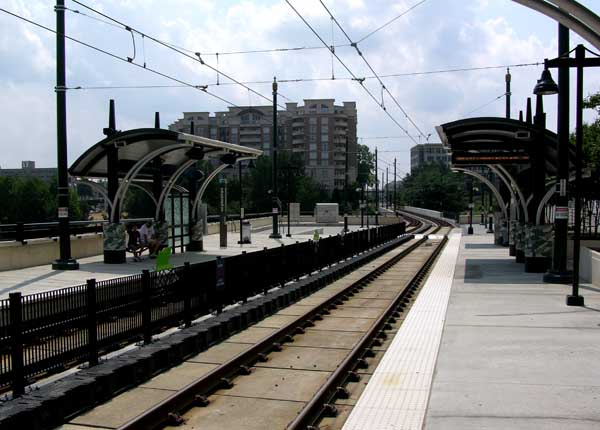
- Looking south across the I-277 bridge.

General information
- Location: 260 East Brooklyn Village Ave; Charlotte, North Carolina; United States
- Coordinates: 35°13′17″N 80°50′49″W
- Owner: Charlotte Area Transit System
- Platforms: 2 side platforms
- Tracks: 2

Construction
- Structure type: Elevated
- Cycle facilities: Bicycle racks
- Accessible: yes
- Architect: Ralph Whitehead Associates
- Architectural style: Modern

History
- Opened: August 30, 1996
- Rebuilt: November 24, 2007
- Former names: Westin

Services
Preceding station	CATS	Following station
Carson toward I-485/South Boulevard	Lynx Blue Line	3rd Street/Convention Center toward UNC Charlotte–Main
Former services
Preceding station	CATS	Following station
Morehead toward Atherton Mill	Charlotte Trolley	3rd Street/Convention Center toward 9th Street
Location

Brooklyn Village, formerly Stonewall, is a light rail station in Charlotte, North Carolina. The elevated dual side platforms are a stop along the Lynx Blue Line in Uptown Charlotte.

== Location ==
The station is located on top of the parking structure for the Westin Charlotte, which it is also adjacent too, and is accessible from Brooklyn Village Avenue via stairs and elevators. On its other-side is the Francis, a luxury apartment complex, with a Whole Foods Market, Home2 Suites by Hilton, and other retail and services. Across Brooklyn Village Avenue is the Charlotte Convention Center with the Harvey B. Gantt Center, catercorner at College Street, and the NASCAR Hall of Fame, catercorner at Brevard Street. Other nearby landmarks and popular destinations include: Ally Charlotte Center, Duke Energy Center, JW Marriott Charlotte, Legacy Union, Mint Museum Uptown, Museum Tower, Regions 615, and Bank of America Stadium.

=== Artwork ===
The Wanderwall, completed in 2018, is an eight-story architectural skin installation, located at the Francis parking garage. Designed by French architect Marc Fornes, the blue-green exterior parkade wall is described as elements of flows and networks, with a labyrinthine porosity that allows light through to the garage interior. It was commissioned by both Crescent Communities and the Charlotte Arts and Science Council (ASC).

== History ==
The station first opened for service on August 30, 1996, for the historic Charlotte Trolley, with one track and one wooden platform. In 2001, during construction of the Westin Charlotte, the original wooden platform was removed and the bridge over the John Belk Freeway was refurbished. In mid-2002, the station reopened with a temporary wooden platform at the end of the bridge over the John Belk Freeway. In 2003, the station was renamed the Westin Station after completion of the Westin Charlotte; a new platform for the station was built on top of the parking structure of the adjacent hotel. On February 6, 2006, the station was closed again for reconstruction for the LYNX Blue Line; the Charlotte Area Transit System (CATS) decided going forward to call it Stonewall Station again. The station officially reopened for service on Saturday, November 24, 2007, and as part of its opening celebration fares were not collected. Regular service with fare collection commenced on Monday, November 26, 2007. Charlotte Trolley service resumed on April 20, 2008, but was scaled back to weekend and special events in 2009. In 2010, the Charlotte Trolley service to the station was discontinued. In 2015, the side platforms were lengthened to allow three-car trains at the station. On June 30, 2022, the station was renamed to Brooklyn Village to correspond with the street renaming of Stonewall Street to Brooklyn Village Avenue.

=== Bridge controversy ===
In 1991 when the South College site was chosen as the location for the new Charlotte Convention Center, the demolition of the original rail span built in the 1950s was imminent. Its demolition became necessary as it would not properly align with the proposed design of the new convention center. As a result, it was demolished in 1991 even though it was a known route for a future light rail or trolley line into Uptown. The construction of the replacement span began in spring 1999 and was complete by summer 2001.

== Station layout ==
The station consists of two side platforms and 10 covered waiting areas; other amenities include ticket vending machines, emergency call box, and bicycle racks. The station also features several art installations including a drinking fountain basin designed to look like dogwood, the North Carolina state flower, by Nancy Blum. Bas-reliefs entitled Gingko, by Alice Adams. Leaf motifs on both the pavers and shelters, by Leticia Huerta, and track fencing featuring maple leaves, by Shaun Cassidy.
