= New Bern station =

Light rail station in Charlotte, North Carolina

New Bern
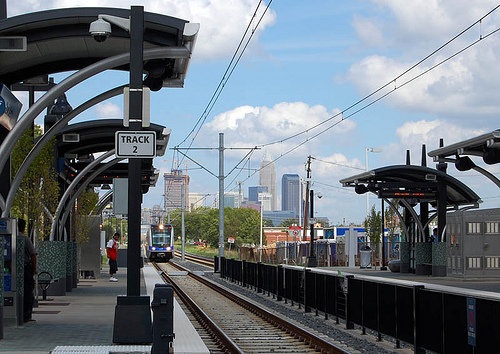
- Looking North from the New Bern Station

General information
- Location: 129 New Bern Street; Charlotte, North Carolina
- Coordinates: 35°11′59″N 80°52′8.5″W
- Owner: Charlotte Area Transit Systems
- Platforms: 2 side platforms
- Tracks: 2

Construction
- Structure type: At-grade
- Cycle facilities: Bicycle racks
- Accessible: yes
- Architect: Ralph Whitehead Associates
- Architectural style: Postmodern

History
- Opened: November 24, 2007

Services
Preceding station	CATS	Following station
Scaleybark toward I-485/South Boulevard	Lynx Blue Line	East/West Boulevard toward UNC Charlotte–Main
Location

New Bern is a light rail station in Charlotte, North Carolina. The at-grade dual side platforms are a stop along the Lynx Blue Line and serves the neighborhoods of Sedgefield, Southside Park and the southernmost point of South End.

== Location ==
The station is located next to New Bern Street and is accessible by sidewalk and the Charlotte Rail Trail. The immediate area features multi-level apartments, retail, and breweries. Nearby is the South Boulevard Light Rail Facility.

=== Artwork ===
The Pepsi Cube, created by Ivan Depena, is a blue cube made of crushed Pepsi cans which sits adjacent to the station. The sculpture is a reminder of the former Pepsi bottling complex that existed at the same location from 1966-2015. The street itself is named after New Bern, North Carolina, the city where Pepsi was first created.

== History ==
The station officially opened for service on Saturday, November 24, 2007, and as part of its opening celebration fares were not collected; regular service with fare collection commenced on Monday, November 26, 2007.

=== Incidents and accidents ===
- April 18, 2008: An 80 feet (24 m) tall silo adjacent to the line, just north of the New Bern Station, collapsed, with some of its debris causing minor damage to the track and disrupting service during the evening rush hour. Service was fully restored by the following day, but this marked the first disruption in service since the opening of the line in November 2007 due to conditions outside the control of CATS.

== Station layout ==
The station consists of two side platforms and six covered waiting areas; other amenities include ticket vending machines, an emergency call box, and bicycle racks. The station also features several art installations including a drinking fountain basin designed to look like dogwood, the North Carolina state flower, by Nancy Blum. Bas-reliefs entitled Hornbeam, by Alice Adams. Leaf motifs on both the pavers and shelters, by Leticia Huerta. River stone benches, by Hoss Haley, and track fencing with willow oak leaves, by Shaun Cassidy.
