= Stonewall station =

Stonewall station may refer to:

- Christopher Street–Stonewall station, a New York City Subway station
- Brooklyn Village station, a light rail station in Charlotte, North Carolina that was formerly known as Stonewall station
