= First Ward Park =

Park in North Carolina, US

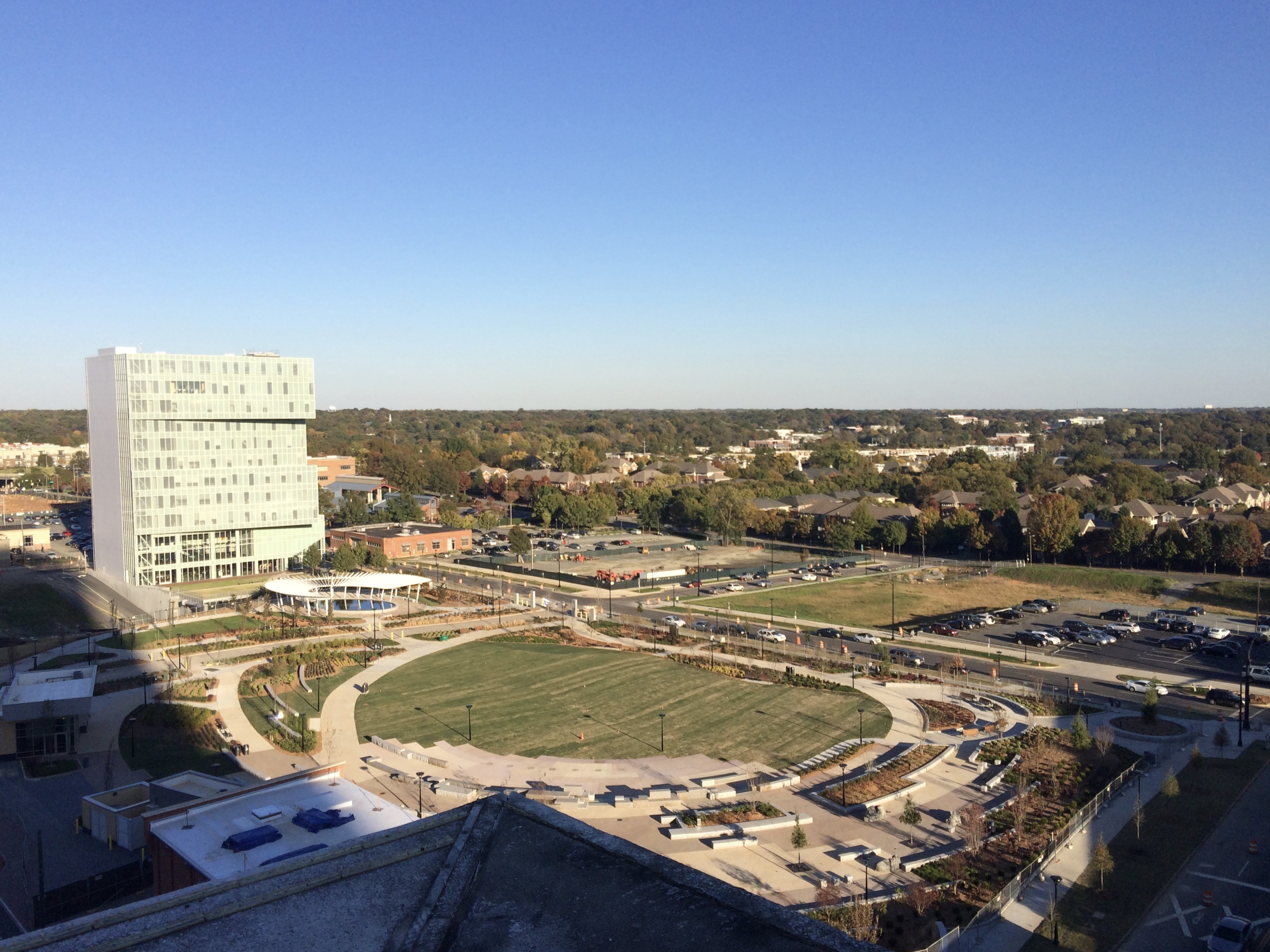
- First Ward Park on October 30, 2015
- Interactive map of First Ward Park
- Type: Urban park
- Location: Charlotte, North Carolina
- Coordinates: 35.227648°N 80.836605°W
- Area: 4.6 acres (1.9 ha)
- Opened: December 8, 2015
- Designer: Shadley Associates
- Owner: Mecklenburg County
- Operator: Mecklenburg County Parks and Recreation
- Parking: Metered parking along Brevard and 8th streets
- Public transit: 9th Street
- Website: First Ward Park

First Ward Park is a 4.6 acre urban park in the First Ward neighborhood of Uptown Charlotte. After a national competition to attract architects, the firm Shadley Associates was selected to build the park. The park incorporates the existing Dixie's Tavern and UNCC buildings, and new construction will include an office tower, hotel, and parking deck on adjacent land.

The park is located at the corner of 7th and Brevard St, adjacent to ImaginOn and the Lynx light rail tracks. Completion of the park occurred on December 8, 2015 with a dedication ceremony followed by tours of the park. This marked the completion of a major park in each of Uptown Charlotte's four wards.

== Planning ==
Development of the First Ward Park and surrounding areas had been in planning for several decades by Daniel Levine, owner of Levine Properties, which holds 24 acres of land in First Ward.

Under a joint partnership between Levine Properties, UNC Charlotte, Mecklenburg County and the City of Charlotte, Levine will trade the park property with the county for an area of land along Brevard between 8th and 9th streets.

The First Ward Park was highlighted in the Charlotte 2020 Vision Plan adopted by the City Council in September 2011. The park is mentioned as the keystone of a "First Ward Village" that would include development of surrounding vacant lots. One of the key accomplishments of such a park would be "creating attractive, active spaces and focal points for each of [the Uptown] neighborhoods.

Developers and city officials were hoping that the park could serve as a catalyst similar to what happened after the construction of nearby Romare Bearden Park and BB&T Ballpark in the Third Ward of Uptown Charlotte, which spurred development of several apartment and office buildings.

== Surrounding Development ==
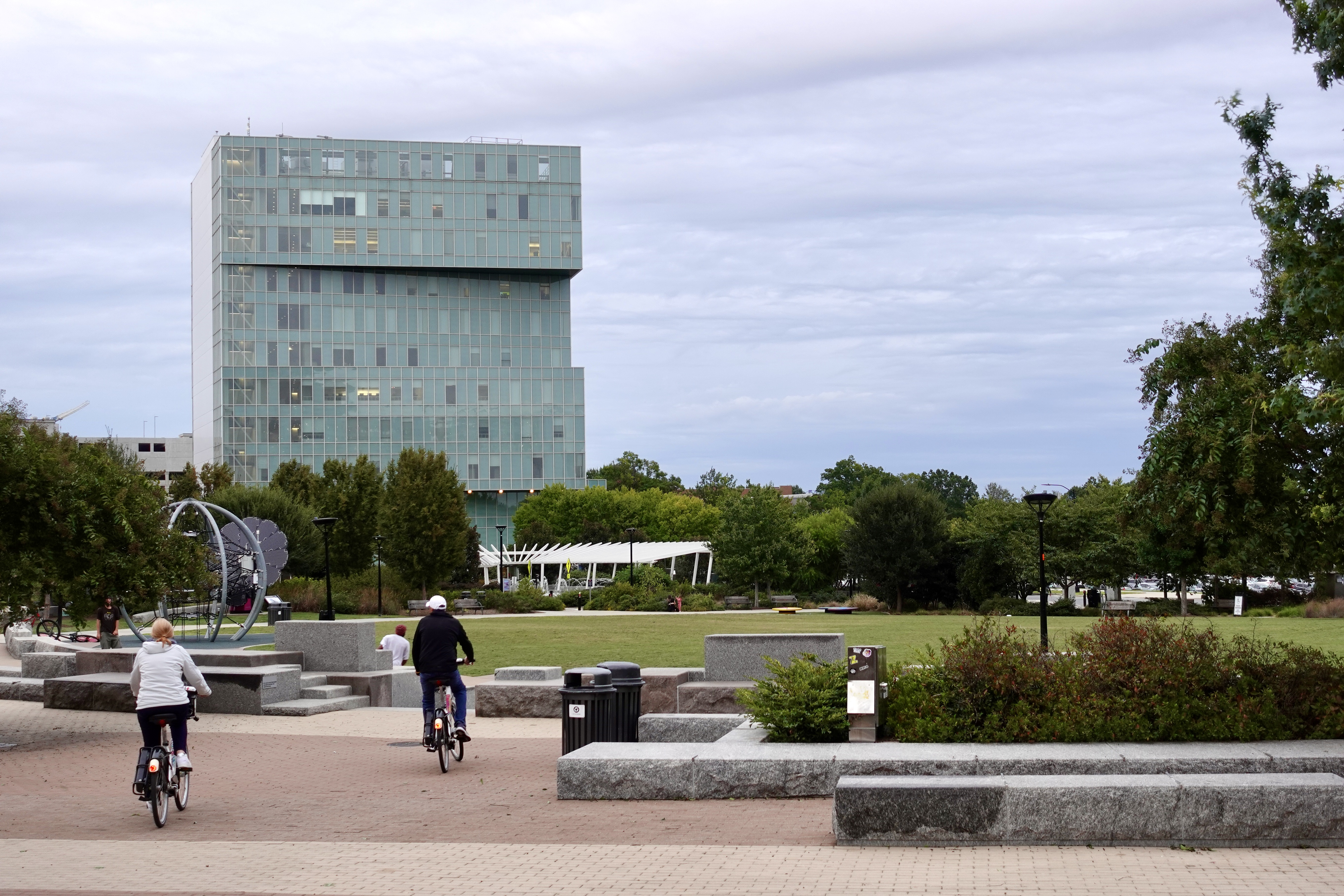
View of First Ward Park in Charlotte, NC

=== Dixie's Tavern Building ===
Historical renovation of the Philip Carey building on 7th street (aka Dixie's Tavern) will turn the building into modern offices. In December, it was announced that the tenant for the Philip Carey building was Google Fiber- who will use the building as their regional HQ.

=== Apartments and Parking Deck ===
As of October 2015, construction of an apartment complex and parking deck located roughly two blocks northeast of the park was on hold as Levine Properties waited for payment from UNC Charlotte, which is contributing $4.2 million to use 300 spaces in the 1,300-space deck. The apartment complex will have 264 units and wrap around the parking deck.

=== Hotels ===
Hotel construction will likely occur before the office tower. The hotels will be a Canopy and Homewood Suites hotel, which are Hilton-owned brands. Construction could begin as early as 2016.

=== Office Tower ===
An office tower is planned adjacent to the park at the corner of 9th Street and the light rail tracks. Search for an anchor tenant is still ongoing however, and construction won't start without one.
