= Former Nebel Knitting Mill =

Historic building in North Carolina, US

- Nebel Knitting Mill, Former
- U.S. National Register of Historic Places
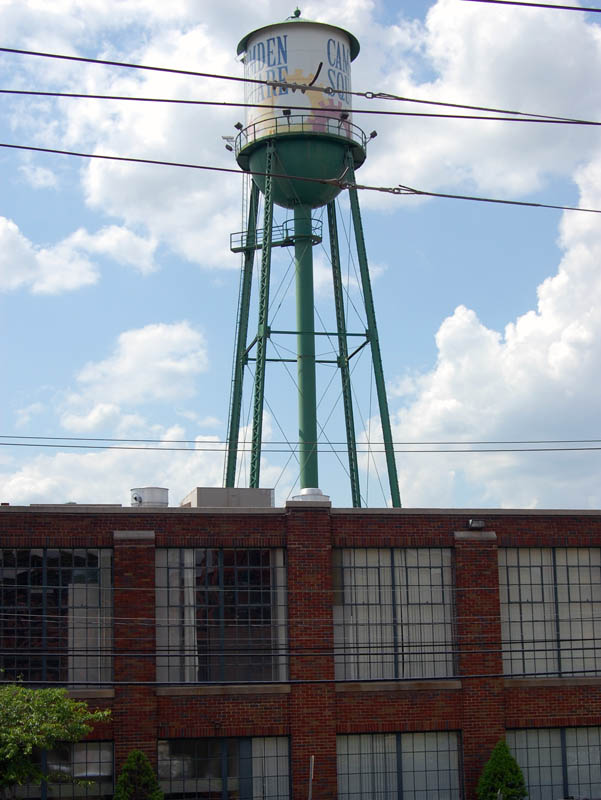
- Former Nebel Knitting Mill, May 2008

- Location within North Carolina Location within the United States
- Location: 101 W. Worthington Ave., Charlotte, North Carolina
- Coordinates: 35°12′41″N 80°51′38″W
- Area: less than one acre
- Built: 1927, 1929
- Architect: Biberstein, Richard C.
- Architectural style: Vernacular industrial
- NRHP reference No.: 91001376
- Added to NRHP: September 5, 1991

Former Nebel Knitting Mill is a historic textile mill building located at Charlotte, Mecklenburg County, North Carolina. It was designed by noted mill architect Richard C. Biberstein and built in 1927 and expanded in 1929. It is a two-story, reinforced concrete building with a brick veneer and decorative concrete detailing with Art Moderne detailing. The building has a rectangular plan measuring 204 feet across the facade and 182 feet deep. The 1927 portion has a stepped-parapet roofline with concrete coping, while the mill's 1929 part has concrete coping and a simple, crenelated roofline.

It was added to the National Register of Historic Places in 1991.

This area has been redeveloped into the Design District (Charlotte).
