= Calgary Design District =

Shopping area in Calgary, Alberta, Canada

Coordinates: 51.042757°N 114.076645°W

The Design District is a shopping area in Calgary, Alberta, Canada, centered on 11th Avenue S.W.
