= Orlando Design District =

The Orlando Design District is an area of Orlando, Florida in the United States with a number of businesses with a design focus. These industries include: creative agencies, design firms, print shops, interior designers, architects, photographers, antique shops and vintage boutiques.

Enclosed within a 5-mile radius, the Design District begins at the statue of liberty on Magnolia Avenue, down Orange Avenue to the Florida Hospital and extends out to the intersection of Virginia Drive and Mills Ave.
