= Design District (Charlotte) =

Mixed-use development in Charlotte, North Carolina

Coordinates: 35.2111°N 80.8610°W

The Design District is a 330,000 square foot mixed-use development located within the SouthEnd neighborhood in Charlotte, North Carolina.

Located at the Former Nebel Knitting Mill, the historic warehouse buildings were constructed in 1927, and were sold to Asana Properties for $42.7 million in 2016. The overall development includes seven properties alongside Camden Street, Tremont Avenue, Kingston Avenue, and the Lynx Blue Line light rail. In 2017, Asana Properties announced that it would transition the property into a retail hub over the next five years. In 2018, Superica and Jeni's Splendid Ice Creams opened their first locations in North Carolina. In 2019, it was announced Shake Shack would open a third Charlotte location in the development.
