= Norfolk Southern O-Line =

Railway line in North Carolina

Service
- Type: Freight
- Operator(s): Norfolk Southern Railway

Norfolk Southern O-Line is a seldom used freight line on the Norfolk Southern Railway in the Piedmont region of North Carolina, running from Winston-Salem, NC to Charlotte, NC. Several sections are no longer in use, such as the Barium Springs to Mooresville section. While the O-Line saw much greater traffic during its heyday, the importance of the rail line to the Lake Norman region and the greater Charlotte metropolitan area have increased. In September 2024, the line was purchased by the city of Charlotte for the Lynx Red Line.

== History ==
The O-Line was originally created by the Atlantic, Tennessee, and Ohio Railroad in 1855. During the Civil War, the rail line was dismantled so that the rails could be used elsewhere for the war effort.

After the Civil War, the railroad was reconstructed on the original roadbed and began service again in 1871. The railroad was acquired by the Richmond & Danville Railroad shortly thereafter, until financial problems resulted in the acquisition of the railroad by Southern Railway. The O-Line dramatically increased the textile industry in the north Charlotte area and helped to bring prosperity and increased population to the towns of Huntersville, Davidson, and Mooresville. While passenger traffic declined, freight traffic continued to use the O-Line heavily until the late 1990s. The O-Line continued to be only one of two north-south Category-1 mainlines in North Carolina that did not require heavy usage of subsidiary connections.

== Modern Era Usage ==
While Norfolk Southern still uses the O-Line to service several industrial customers in the area north of Charlotte, according to Lake Norman Publications, the main value of the O-Line to Norfolk Southern lies in its strategic value in negotiating with the North Carolina Railroad Company:

The line – as Gray, Thunberg and Woods acknowledged years ago, and railroad historian and writer Dan Robie explains in an essay on the wvncrails.org website – combines with Norfolk Southern’s L-Line (between Winston-Salem and northern Mooresville) to provide an alternative to a high-demand 90-mile section of North Carolina Railroad Company (NCRC) owned track Norfolk Southern currently pays to use between Greensboro and Charlotte.

According to news media outlets in the Charlotte region (such as WCNC), Norfolk Southern has always maintained a continuous and open stance on the possibility of CATS using the O-Line for a Commuter Rail route to Lake Norman.

In 2023 the last Norfolk Southern O-Line customer, Pennsylvania-based bedding manufacturer FXI (formerly known as Foamex), closed its Corneilius, North Carolina facility. This effectifely ended any rail traffic on the line for the foreseeable future.

== Future Usage for CATS Red Line ==
In late July 2023, Norfolk Southern Chief Strategy Officer Michael McClellan wrote in a letter to Charlotte's Mayor and City Manager that Norfolk Southern was now willing to consider options in transacting the O-Line for use by CATS for the Lynx Red Line. The letter was sent two months after the closure of the last Norfolk Southern customer to use the O-Line, and around the same time that Charlotte City Council had approved $5 million to update the existing Red Line design.

On September 9, 2024, the city of Charlotte finalized its purchase of the O-Line for $74 million.
