= Sedgefield (Charlotte neighborhood) =

Neighborhood in Charlotte, North Carolina

Coordinates: 35.193877°N 80.857247°W

Sedgefield is a neighborhood of Charlotte, North Carolina, United States. It is situated between Park Road and South Boulevard and belongs to the popular South End (Charlotte neighborhood). The neighborhood was developed in the 1940s, with most of the original houses being constructed in the American Small House style.

Sedgefield is only 3 miles (4.8 km) away from Charlotte Douglas International Airport and within walking distance to the Bank of America Stadium. The core of the neighborhood is a mix of duplex housing and single-family homes along tree-lined streets. Property values have been increasing faster than average due to the development along South Boulevard. Many of the homes in Sedgefield have been renovated or even rebuilt from the ground and expanded. In 2014 Redfin real estate brokerage predicted Sedgefield to be one of the nation's "hottest neighborhoods" in terms of price development.

== Area ==
Sedgefield has an area of 493 acres (200 ha). Sedgefield borders Myers Park and Dilworth, where Charlotte's largest hospital, Carolinas Medical Center, is located.

== Demographics ==
In 2012, approximately 3,200 people lived in Sedgefield. The median age of its residents was 32 years. Median household income in 2012 was US$70,000. It has a strong neighborhood association representation. There are many condo projects underway along its west side, spurred by the completion of the LYNX blue line of the Charlotte Light Rail. The boom in residential development is expected to double the neighborhood's population of about 3,200 by the end of 2015. The crime rate is below the county average.

== Transportation infrastructure and sites of interest ==
=== Mass transit ===
98% of housing units are within 0.5 miles (0.80 km) of a transit stop.

The following buses from the Charlotte Area Transit System (CATS) serve Sedgefield:

- #12 (South Boulevard)
- #19 (Park Road)

The only light rail in the city runs through Sedgefield and connects its residents with the Inner City/Uptown. It is called LYNX blue line and Sedgefield's LYNX stop is New Bern Station.

Sedgefield has been deemed one of Charlotte's most walkable neighborhoods.

=== Roads ===
Park Road and South Boulevard are major thoroughfares leading into and out of Charlotte. Sedgefield Park serves as a pedestrian connection to bordering Dilworth.

=== Parks ===
Sedgefield is home to two parks operated by the Mecklenburg County Parks and Recreation Department: Sedgefield Park and EB Moore Park. Sedgefield Park is located off Elmhurst Road on the northern edge of the neighborhood and is a popular getaway spot for locals. Often referred to as the "butterfly park" due to its uniquely designed walking path, it has a playground, a pavilion, one tennis court, and a half basketball court. The annual Sedgefest event, organized by the Sedgefield Neighborhood Association, is held at this park, typically in May. EB Moore Park is located on the southeastern edge of the neighborhood on Marsh Road and features two tennis courts, a full size soccer field, a pavilion, and a playground. The Sedgefield neighborhood is also within walking distance of Freedom Park, which is Charlotte's most popular 98-acre (40 ha) public park. It is the location of various events throughout the year, including the famous Festival in the Park.

== Education, places of faith and economy ==
=== School system ===
Residents of Sedgefield attend Charlotte-Mecklenburg Schools, including Myers Park High School. Sedgefield is also home to Sedgefield Middle and Sedgefield Montessori Elementary School. The private Holy Trinity Catholic Middle School is located on Park Road.

=== Library ===
Charlotte Mecklenburg Library is located at the southwest corner of Sedgefield.

=== Churches ===
The main churches in the neighborhood are Sedgefield United Methodist Church and Jehovah's Witnesses.

=== Commerce ===
Nearby restaurants and grocery stores are within walking distance, including a broad mix of small, locally owned bar-type diners as well as Asian restaurants and even family run bakeries, located along South Boulevard and the extension of Park Road. A 55,000-square-foot (5,100 m^{2}) supermarket was under construction in 2013 on a 4-acre (1.6 ha) lot at 2300 South Boulevard. A microbrewery was also located in Sedgefield.
