= Atherton Mill station =

Future light rail station in Charlotte, North Carolina, USA

Atherton Mill
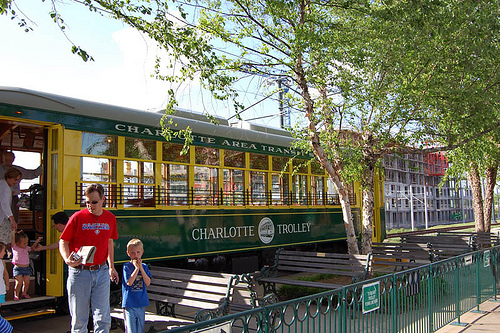

General information
- Coordinates: 35.2074°N 80.8629°W
- Owner: Charlotte Area Transit System

History
- Opened: August 30, 1996
- Opening: 2028 (infill station)
- Closed: June 28, 2010

Future services
| Preceding station | CATS | Following station |
|---|---|---|
| New Bern toward I-485/South Boulevard | Lynx Blue Line | East/West Boulevard toward UNC Charlotte–Main |
Former services
| Preceding station | CATS | Following station |
|---|---|---|
| Terminus | Charlotte Trolley | Tremont toward 9th Street |
Location

Atherton Mill is a future light rail station in Charlotte, North Carolina. Formally served as a terminus for the Charlotte Trolley (1996–2010), the Charlotte Area Transit System (CATS) announced on September 28, 2026 that it would be the name of the new South End infill station, opening in 2028.

== History ==
=== Atherton Mill and its immediate area ===
The Atherton Cotton Mill was built in 1892 and was the first industrial mill in the planned Dilworth factory district. It operated from 1893 to 1933, when Atherton Mills, Inc. lost ownership due to foreclosure. In 1937, the J. Schoenith Company, Inc. purchased the mill and converted to manufacturer "high grade" candy, baked goods, and peanut products. Lasting till the early 1960s, the facility since then was utilized as a wholesaling site for textile-related manufacturing companies and then later converted into office and residential condominiums. In 2017, part of the property was partitioned and redeveloped into a mixed-use development called Novel Atherton.

The Parks-Cramer Company Complex was built in 1919 and was expanded several times; the facility manufactured air conditioning equipment for textile mills and operated till 1988, when the firm sold its operations. Soon afterwards, the complex was converted into retail and office spaces.

The Trolley Barn, located between Atherton Mill and the Parks-Cramer Company Complex, was originally a section of warehouse, for Atherton Mill, before being converted into a museum and restoration shop in 1996 for the Charlotte Trolley. The Charlotte Area Transit System (CATS) took over operations in 2003 and by 2007 the facility was repurposed as a Farmers' market once the museum was relocated near Bland Street station. In 2017, the Trolley Barn section was kept while the rest of the original warehouse building was razed. In 2021, the building was repurposed as a restaurant and brewery, called the Trolley Barn Fermentory and Food Hall, with the farmers' market relocated to the adjacent courtyard area.

=== Charlotte Trolley service ===
Located in front of the Trolley Barn, the heritage streetcar station began operations on August 30, 1996. Consisting of a fence-separated seating area along one of the two tracks, the station operated Thursday through Sunday and then daily on June 28, 2004. Service was temporarily halted from February 5, 2006 through April 20, 2008; after-which the station operated on a limited schedule. When the Charlotte Trolley ended service on June 28, 2010, the Atherton Mill station, along with three other trolley only stations, ceased operations. In 2019, the second track that ended in front of the Trolley Barn was removed and replaced with a cement walkway that connects to Tremont station and the Charlotte Rail Trail.

=== South End infill station ===
Announced in 2022, a new infill station was to be located on the Blue Line tracks between New Bern and East/West Boulevard stations. At an estimated cost of $24 million, the platforms are in a split configuration, with the northbound platforms behind Publix and the southbound behind The Line/Atherton Lofts. Part of the reason for the selected station site is to provide a safe level crossing to access the grocery store from the north side of the tracks, as jumping the gates to cross the railway line had become an issue. The pedestrian crossing opened on August 31, 2026. On September 28, 2026, CATS announced that Atherton Mill would become station's name.
