= Dilworth (Charlotte neighborhood) =

Historic district in North Carolina, United States

- Dilworth Historic District
- U.S. National Register of Historic Places
- U.S. Historic district
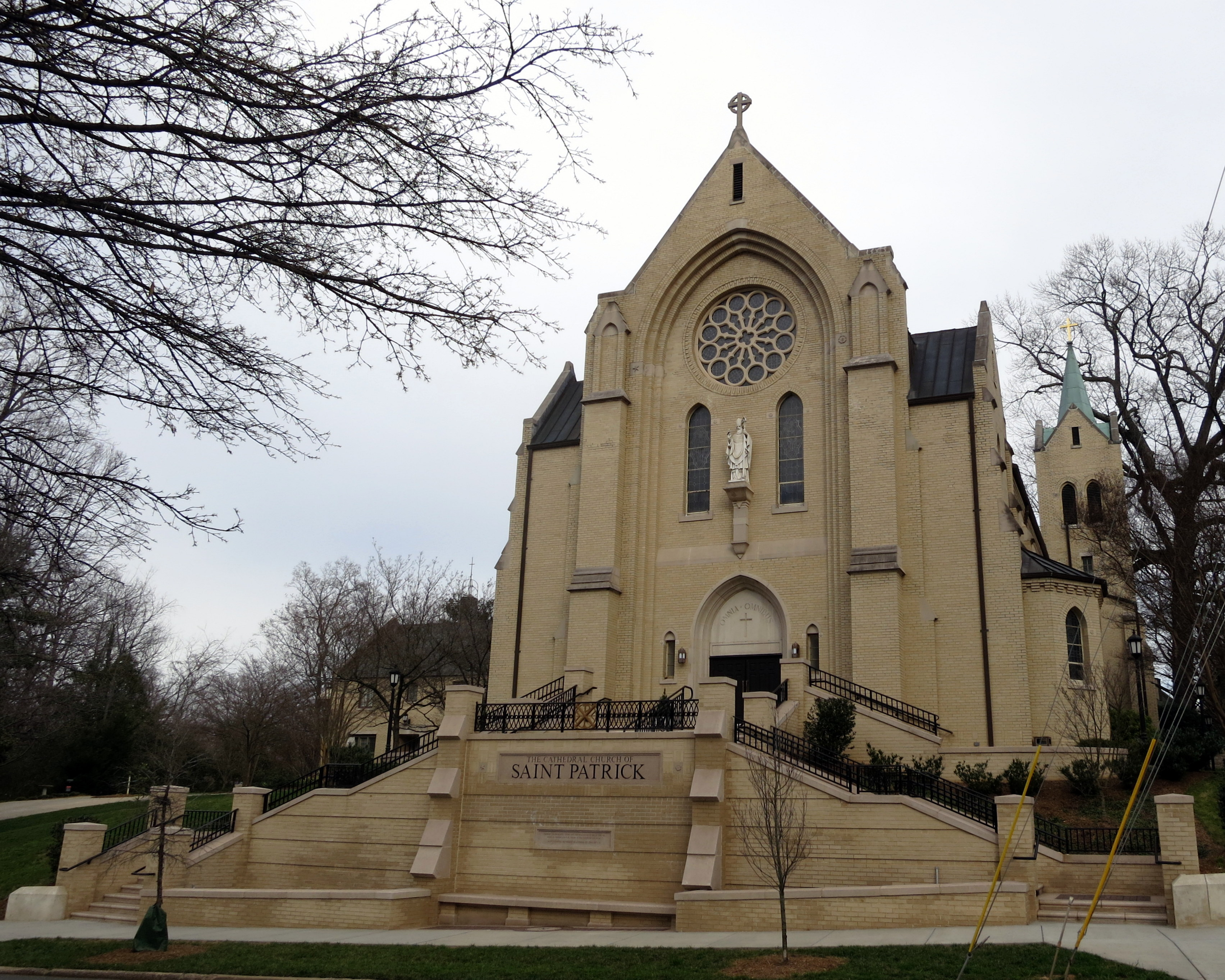
- Cathedral of Saint Patrick in Dilworth

- Location within North Carolina Location within the United States
- Location: Roughly bounded by Myrtle, Morehead, Berkeley, Dilworth Rd. W, Charlotte, Park, Tremont, Cleveland and Renssalaer, Charlotte, North Carolina
- Coordinates: 35°12′28″N 80°51′0″W
- Area: 399.1 acres (161.5 ha)
- Architect: Olmsted Bros. et al.
- Architectural style: Late 19th and 20th Century Revivals, Bungalow/Craftsman, Late Victorian
- NRHP reference No.: 87000610 (original); 00001495 (increase)

Significant dates
- Added to NRHP: April 09, 1987
- Boundary increase: December 7, 2000

Dilworth is a neighborhood of Charlotte, Mecklenburg County, North Carolina, United States. The neighborhood was Charlotte's first streetcar suburb and was established by Edward Dilworth Latta in the 1890s on 250 acres (1 km²) southwest of the original city limits. It included the Joseph Forsyth Johnson designed Latta Park. Planned largely with a grid pattern similar to the city's original four wards, Dilworth was initially designated the Eighth Ward.

Dilworth was born out of the powerful impact that the newly minted streetcar had on Charlotte's original four ward neighborhood. The first streetcars were horse-drawn and later mule-drawn. These precursor streetcars and walking were Charlotteans' primary mode of transportation which kept development close to Trade and Tryon Streets, Charlotte's urban core. The first electric streetcar, Latta's Charlotte Street Railway Company, began operation May 18, 1891, just two days before Dilworth was opened. The original streetcar was replaced just five short years later by Charlotte Electric Railway.

Streetcars or trolleys were a popular mode of transportation and made adjacent real estate extremely desirable. The Charlotte Electric Railway trolley became a billboard for the Dilworth community as it prominently displayed "Buy a home in Dilworth for rent money". Trolleys remained critical to Charlotte's development until car No. 85, the last to run, ceased operations in March 1938. This car was used for many purposes over the years and was about to be scrapped when it was located by the Charlotte-Mecklenburg Historic Landmarks Commission and meticulously restored as part of a project to bring Trolleys back to Charlotte. Since 1996, Car No. 85 once again proudly shuttles passengers from Southend, a neighborhood to adjacent to Dilworth, to Charlotte's urban center.

Sedgefield Park serves as a pedestrian connection to bordering Sedgefield.

The streets of Dilworth feature stately, mature oak trees, sidewalks, and houses with front porches. The homes are primarily bungalows — with the occasional Queen Anne — and some larger, two-story Colonial Revivals lining Dilworth Road East and West. East Boulevard serves as the main thoroughfare through the neighborhood. East Boulevard is lined with restaurants, offices and shops, many located in renovated homes. Charlotte's largest hospital, Carolinas Medical Center, is in Dilworth. This 861-bed teaching hospital is the region's only Level 1 trauma center.

Much of the neighborhood is listed on the National Register of Historic Places as the Dilworth Historic District. The district encompasses 1,389 contributing buildings and 1 contributing structure. The district was listed in 1987, with a boundary increase in 2000.
