= Charlotte Trolley =

Heritage streetcar in North Carolina, U.S.

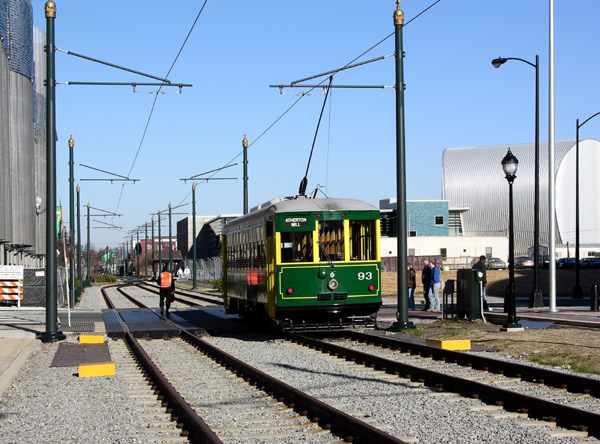

Overview
- Status: Ceased operation
- Owner: Charlotte Area Transit System
- Locale: Charlotte, North Carolina
- Termini: Atherton Mill (south); 9th Street (north)
- Stations: 11

Service
- Type: Heritage Streetcar
- System: Charlotte Area Transit System
- Operator: Charlotte Area Transit System

History
- Opened: August 30, 1996
- Completed: June 28, 2004
- Closed: June 28, 2010

Technical
- Line length: 2.1 mi (3.4 km)
- Number of tracks: 2
- Character: Grade-separated
- Track gauge: 4 ft 8 1/2 in (1,435 mm)
- Electrification: Overhead catenary
- Highest elevation: 742 ft (226 m)

The Charlotte Trolley was a heritage streetcar that operated in Charlotte in the U.S. state of North Carolina. The line ran along the former Norfolk Southern right of way between Tremont Avenue in the Historic South End in a northerly direction to its terminus at 9th Street Uptown. It ran on tracks mostly shared with the Lynx Blue Line.

== History ==
The Charlotte Trolley represented the return of streetcar service to the city of Charlotte since the closure of its original network on March 14, 1938, which had been in operation since May 18, 1891. The return of the trolley came on August 30, 1996, running in the evenings on Thursday, Friday and Saturday nights and Sunday afternoons for an initial six-month trial period. The trial period occurred on a 1.8-mile rail line between the Atherton Mill trolley barn and Stonewall Street.

Through the initial six months of operation ending on February 28, 1997, the trolley saw a ridership of 25,000. As a result of the success of the trial run of the trolley, Norfolk Southern awarded the trolley a one-year extension of the agreement to use its track.

After a new bridge was completed over Stonewall Street, 7-days-a-week service commenced between Atherton Mill in the South End and 9th Street Uptown on June 28, 2004. Operations prior to that date were run by a group of volunteers (some retirees) where some of them were hired by the Charlotte Area Transit System (CATS) which has operated the Trolley since that time. At that time, CATS purchased three replica trolleys similar to number 85, an original Charlotte car dating from the 1920s.

=== Suspension and end of trolley service ===
Service was temporarily halted on February 5, 2006, when construction began to convert the route into a light rail line. Initially service was to only be halted for a year, with the trolley running approximately a year before light rail service commenced. However, by November 2006 CATS determined it would be unfeasible to run the trolley service with the corridor still under construction.

Service resumed on April 20, 2008, with the vintage trolley cars running on the same tracks as the LYNX light rail vehicles. With the opening of the Lynx Blue Line, the Charlotte Trolley ended its daily service. It continued to run on weekends until the service completely ended on June 28, 2010.

== Service stock ==
The line operated three replica streetcars, numbered 91, 92 and 93. They were delivered to Charlotte Trolley from Gomaco Trolley Company in the fall of 2004. Beginning in July 2015, these units were then used to operate Phase 1 of the CityLynx Gold Line between CTC/Arena and Hawthorne & 5th Street station, and were withdrawn in June 2019 when Gold Line service was suspended to allow for completion of Phase 2. They were sold in late 2020 to the Memphis Area Transit Authority, for eventual use on the MATA Trolley system.

== Non-operating stock ==
=== Number 1 ===
Trolley No. 1 was originally built in Philadelphia by J.G. Brill in 1907 for Athens, Greece. The trolley's restoration was complete in 1989 by trolley restorer Bruce Thain of Guilford, Connecticut.

=== Number 85 ===
Car 85, built in 1927, was the last electric streetcar to run in Charlotte on March 14, 1938. Alexander Garfield Collie, Sr. supervised the drivers when the streetcars were retired. His son, Alexander Garfield Collie, Jr. was driving car 85 for its final run in 1938. In his personal diary, Collie Sr. wrote of the car's final run into the barn. Directing his son, Collie, Jr. to "move over," he took the controls of number 85 for its final run. After retirement it was sold for $100, along with all the remaining cars. Following the system closure, Charlotte would rely solely on bus transit to serve its citizens until the opening of the Blue Line in 2007.

Car 85 was subsequently sold, stripped of its motors and seats, and sold to the N.C. Air National Guard, which used it for office space at the Charlotte airport. In 1939-1940, it was again sold and converted into a diner/concession stand at Caldwell Station, N.C., being used in this role until the early 1950s. Around late 1951, it was purchased for $125–150 by Daisy Mae Trapp Moore, a Huntersville resident, who moved it into her backyard and converted it into a mobile home to house relatives. The car was subsequently occupied by various renters. Its last occupant, construction worker Clay Thompson, lived in the former Car 85 from approximately 1972 to late 1987, when the town of Huntersville condemned the makeshift residence as it lacked indoor plumbing. Though Moore had intended to use the former streetcar as a storage shed, she sold it to the Emergency Properties Fund of the Charlotte Mecklenburg Historic Properties Commission for $1,000 on April 12, 1988.

Following the streetcar's discovery, the Charlotte Historic Landmarks Commission led the charge in its restoration. On May 6, 1988, the streetcar was returned by road to Charlotte and stored behind the Discovery Place Museum for preservation and restoration. Original drivers' stools from the Charlotte streetcars and a period trolley bell were located and donated to the project. By the end of 1989, the streetcar had been moved to a former city bus barn, where restoration continued. Motors, trucks, wheels and electrics were sourced from retired streetcars in Melbourne, Australia. Initially named "Trolley Car No. 2" but unofficially called "Car 85", the streetcar was conclusively identified as Car 85 when surviving interior identifying numbers were revealed during restoration work in 1990. Its restoration was completed in 1991 at a cost of just over $100,000. That year, when car 85 was reintroduced to service, passengers on its first official, public run included a number of Collie's descendants: son Charles Reid Collie, Sr. and wife Louise Briggs Collie, and grandsons John Wayne Collie, Thomas Alexander Collie, and Roy Alan Collie (born after the death of his grandfather, Collie, Sr.)

Returning to service in 1996, number 85 served riders through 2006 when service was temporally halted. In March 2007, it was announced that due to safety concerns, it would not be used as part of the historic trolley network after its reopening in 2007. Charlotte Trolley, Inc., which owns the car, entered into a Memorandum of Understanding (MOU) in 2008 with the City of Charlotte to allow special excursions for it up to twice per year. Car 85 was housed in CATS' light rail maintenance facility on South Blvd until 2014, when in order to make room for three replica trolleys intended for use on the CityLynx Gold Line, it was loaned to the N.C. Transportation Museum and displayed there for four years. In June 2018, Lakewood Trolley, a Charlotte nonprofit, secured a 10-year lease for the future use of Car 85 on a former trolley line located along the Stewart Creek Greenway west of uptown Charlotte. Car 85 returned to Charlotte in July 2018. Work to restore the trolley line and develop the necessary infrastructure remains ongoing.

=== Number 117 ===
Asheville 117 was manufactured in 1927 by J.G. Brill and is commonly known as a Birney Safety Car. In the fall of that year, the Carolina Power & Light Company purchased ten of these cars to operate in Asheville, North Carolina. It currently awaits restoration at the Charlotte Trolley Car Barn.

== See also ==
- LYNX Rapid Transit Services
- CityLynx Gold Line
