= 9th Street station (Charlotte) =

Light rail station in Charlotte, North Carolina

9th Street
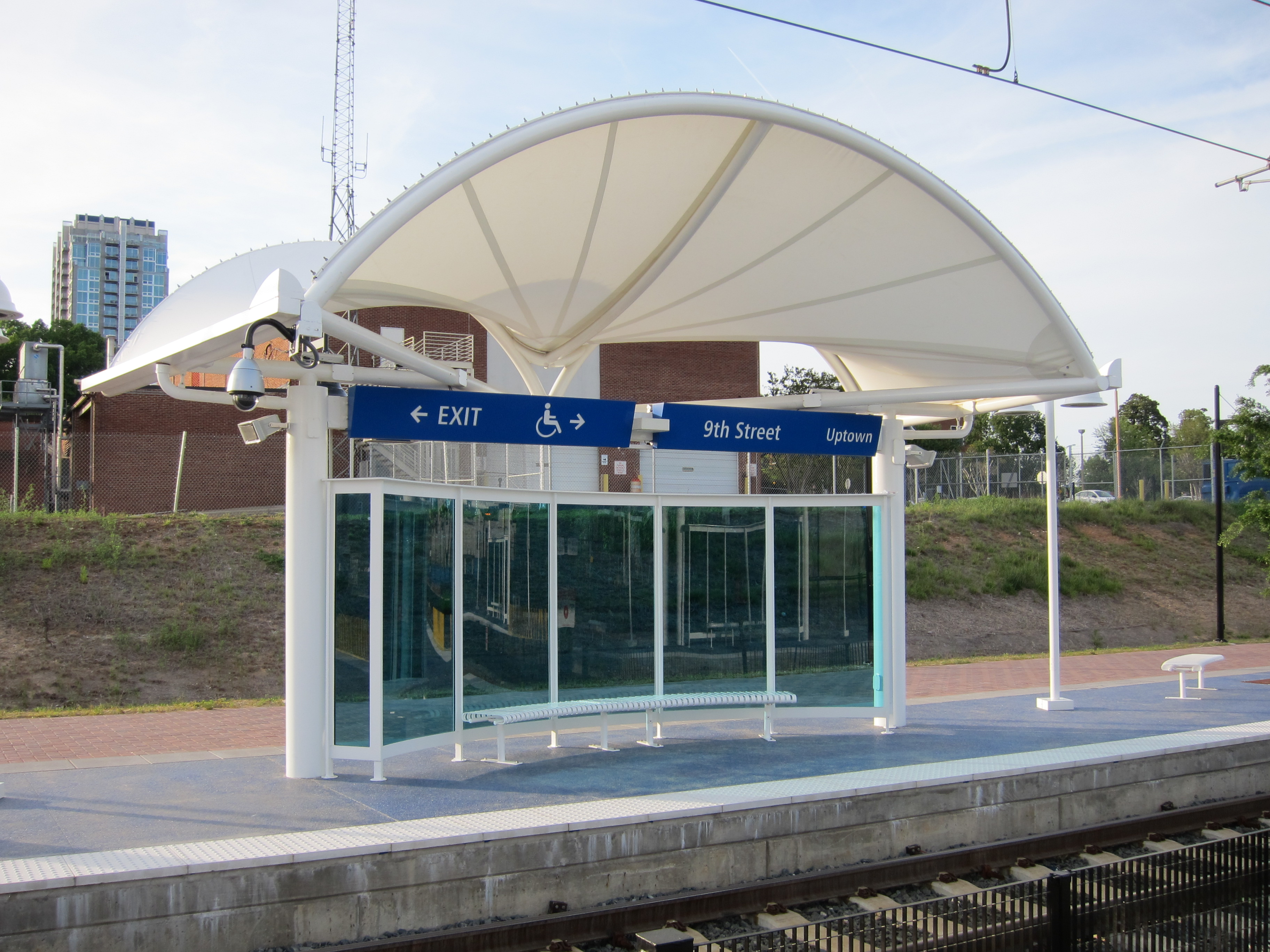

General information
- Location: 237 East Ninth Street; Charlotte, North Carolina; United States
- Coordinates: 35.2297°N 80.8350°W
- Owner: Charlotte Area Transit System
- Platforms: 2 side platforms
- Tracks: 2

Construction
- Structure type: At-grade
- Cycle facilities: Bicycle racks
- Architect: Anna V. Murch & Douglas Hollis
- Architectural style: Postmodern

Other information
- Website: 9th Street Station

History
- Opened: June 24, 2004
- Rebuilt: March 16, 2018

Services
Preceding station	CATS	Following station
7th Street toward I-485/South Boulevard	Lynx Blue Line	Parkwood toward UNC Charlotte–Main
Former services
Preceding station	CATS	Following station
7th Street toward Atherton Mill	Charlotte Trolley	Terminus
Location

9th Street is a light rail station in Charlotte, North Carolina. The at-grade dual side platforms are a stop along the Lynx Blue Line and serves Uptown Charlotte's First Ward as well as First Ward Park and the UNC Charlotte Center City Campus.

== Location ==
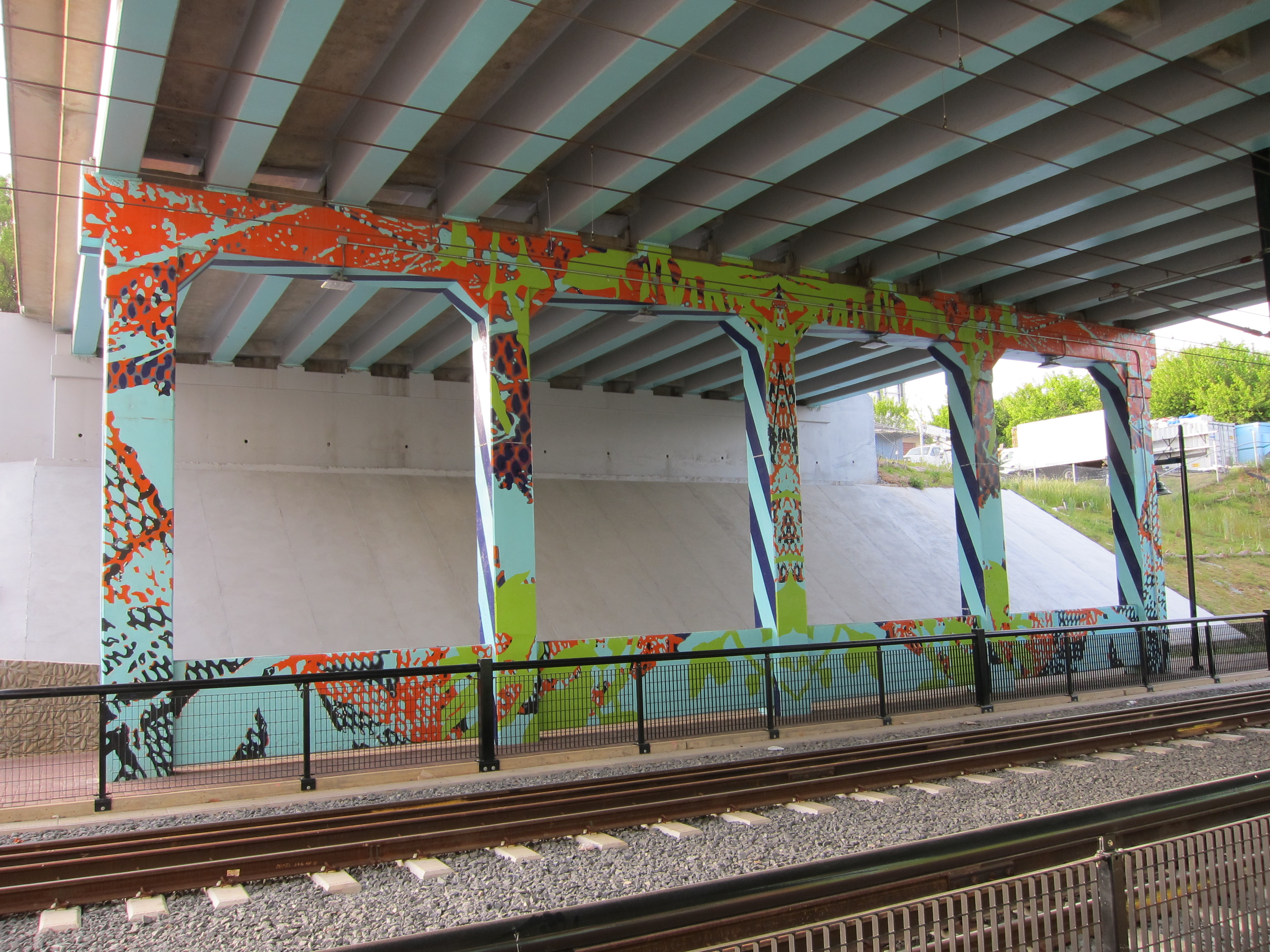
Halcyon Idyll I

The station is located next to 9th Street and is accessible by sidewalk and the Charlotte Rail Trail. immediate to the station is the Ellis, First Ward Park, and UNC Charlotte Center City Campus; while nearby are 525 North Tryon, Charlotte Ballet Academy, First Ward Creative Arts Academy, McColl Center, and SkyHouse Uptown.

=== Artwork ===
As part of the CATS Art in Transit program, 9th Street is a signature station design by Anna Valentina Murch and Doug Hollis, while working within STV Inc. overall Lynx Blue Line Extension design. Called UMBRA, Latin for shadow; the title combines the practical and metaphorical nature of their artistic intent. Inspired by Charlotte's historic textile industry, all ten passenger shelters have white tensile fabric canopies, curved blue glass windscreens, white benches and fixtures, and a blue platform.

Nearby, along the rail trail, is Halcyon Idyll I and Halcyon Idyll II, by Sharon Dowell. These murals cover approximately 9,000 sq ft (840 m^{2}) on five facades facing the sidewalk, located under 11th Street and Brookshire Freeway. Adjacent to the underpass murals is a signal house wrapped in vinyl with a vibrant pattern titled Coexist.

== History ==
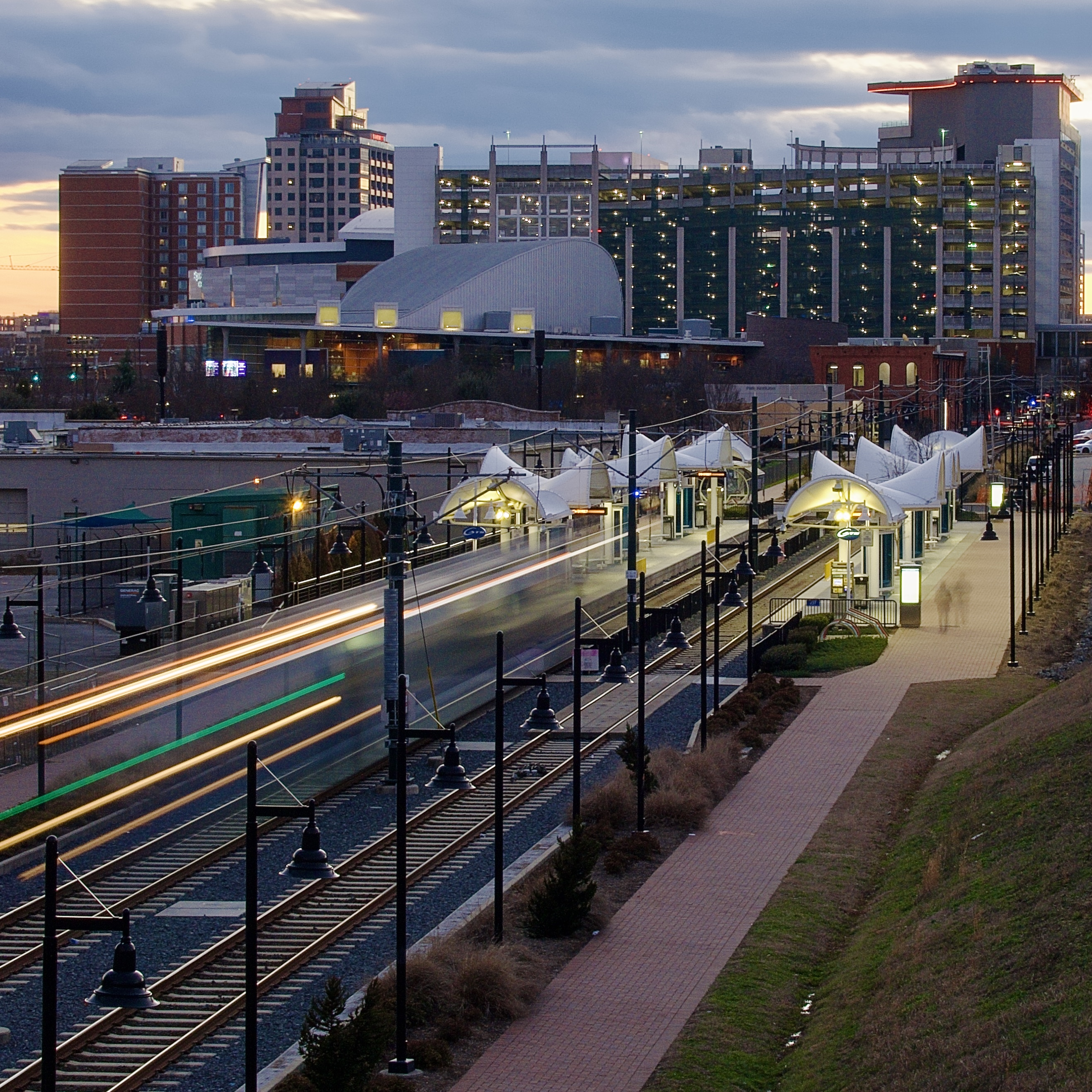
View from 11th Street

The station first opened for service on June 28, 2004, for the historic Charlotte Trolley, with one track and one platform, located south adjacent to 9th Street. Operating for little over 19 months, it was soon closed on February 6, 2006 because of LYNX Blue Line construction at neighboring 6th Street Station. The station reopened on April 20, 2008, when Charlotte Trolley service resumed, but was soon scaled back to weekend and special events in 2009. On June 28, 2010, the Charlotte Trolley service to the station was discontinued and the station was closed for a second time. For the next few years, the station remained unused while planning and funding was established for the Blue Line Extension, which would incorporate 9th Street station.

On July 18, 2013, the official groundbreaking took place near the 9th Street station for the Extension; at the ceremony were the mayor of Charlotte Patsy Kinsey, UNCC chancellor Philip Dubois, federal transit administrator Peter Rogoff and N.C. Governor Pat McCrory, the former mayor of Charlotte and an initial supporter of the LYNX project. By 2016, the original side platform and structure was razed with construction started on a new station located north adjacent to 9th Street. On March 16, 2018, the station was reopened as part of the Blue Line Extension to UNC Charlotte.

== Station layout ==
The station consists of two side platforms and 10 covered waiting areas; other amenities include ticket vending machines, emergency call box, and covered bicycle racks designed by Darren Goins, using geometric abstract shapes.
