= South End, Charlotte =

South End
- Neighborhood
- Central South End, viewed from the 110 East tower in 2026. Visible landmarks include Atherton Mill, the light rail/Rail Trail, the South End sign, the Line, and the Design Center.
- Interactive map of South End
- Coordinates: 35.212558°N 80.858777°W
- Country: United States
- State: North Carolina
- County: Mecklenburg County
- City: Charlotte
- Council Districts: 1, 2, 3
- Annexed: 1907

Government
  - City Council: Larken Egleston; Malcolm Graham; Victoria Watlington
- Time zone: UTC-5 (EST)
  - Summer (DST): UTC-4 (EDT)
- Zip Code: 28203, 28209
- Area codes: 704, 980

South End is a high-density commercial and residential neighborhood immediately southwest of Uptown Charlotte. It is also one of several Municipal Service Districts in Charlotte.

== History ==
=== Beginnings ===
The area now known as South End developed in the mid-19th century following the construction of Charlotte’s first railroad line in the 1850s, which connected the city to Columbia and Charleston, South Carolina. The railroad corridor established South End as a transportation and industrial zone, supporting the growth of textile mills, warehouses, and rail-dependent manufacturing facilities. The neighborhood’s proximity to the rail line made it one of Charlotte’s earliest industrial districts.

By the late 19th and early 20th centuries, South End became closely associated with the textile industry, including cotton mills such as Atherton Mill. Mill villages and worker housing developed nearby, shaping the area’s early residential patterns. Industrial activity remained dominant through the first half of the 20th century, contributing to Charlotte’s emergence as a regional manufacturing center.

Following World War II, broader economic shifts—including suburbanization, deindustrialization, and changes in transportation—led to the decline of South End’s industrial base. Many mills and warehouses closed or were abandoned, and the area experienced population loss and reduced investment during the mid-20th century. By the 1970s and 1980s, much of South End consisted of underutilized industrial property.

Redevelopment began in the late 20th century with adaptive reuse of former industrial buildings for offices, studios, and residential use. Early revitalization efforts were supported by local planning initiatives and private investment. A significant turning point occurred with the opening of the LYNX Blue Line light rail in 2007, which provided direct transit access between South End and Uptown Charlotte and encouraged transit-oriented development along South Boulevard.

Since the 2010s, South End has experienced sustained redevelopment, including large-scale residential, office, and retail projects. Historic industrial structures have been preserved and repurposed alongside new construction, resulting in a built environment that reflects multiple phases of Charlotte’s urban and economic history.

=== Revitalization ===
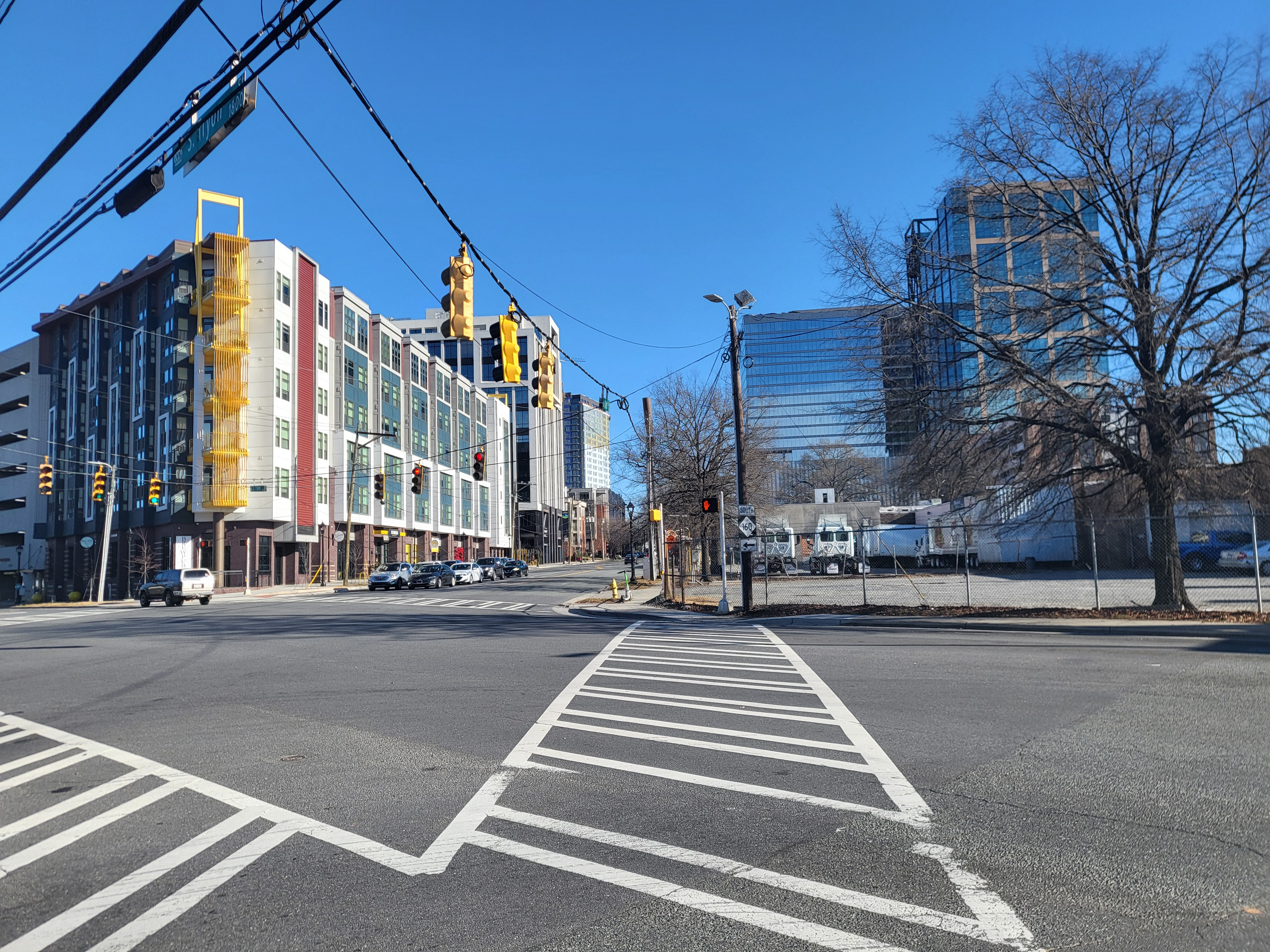
Recent urban development in South End.

Upon the opening of the Lynx Blue Line in 2007, the area has undergone a $2.2 billion transition from abandoned factories to an eclectic mix of office, retail, commercial and high end residential construction, with an additional $1 billion underway. Notable developments include the Design District and Atherton Mill. Since the 2010s, South End has experienced sustained residential growth, with numerous mid- and high-density apartment developments. The neighborhood features a combination of historic industrial structures and contemporary residential and commercial buildings. Population growth and rising property values have contributed to changes in land use and demographics consistent with broader urban redevelopment patterns in Charlotte.

In 2018, South End was named the fastest-growing submarket in the United States for apartment growth. Queensbridge Collective is a large-scale mixed-use development under construction at 1111 South Tryon Street, positioned at the edge of South End and adjacent to Uptown. Developed by Riverside Investment & Development and Woodfield Development, the project includes multiple high-rise towers with residential units, office space, and retail.

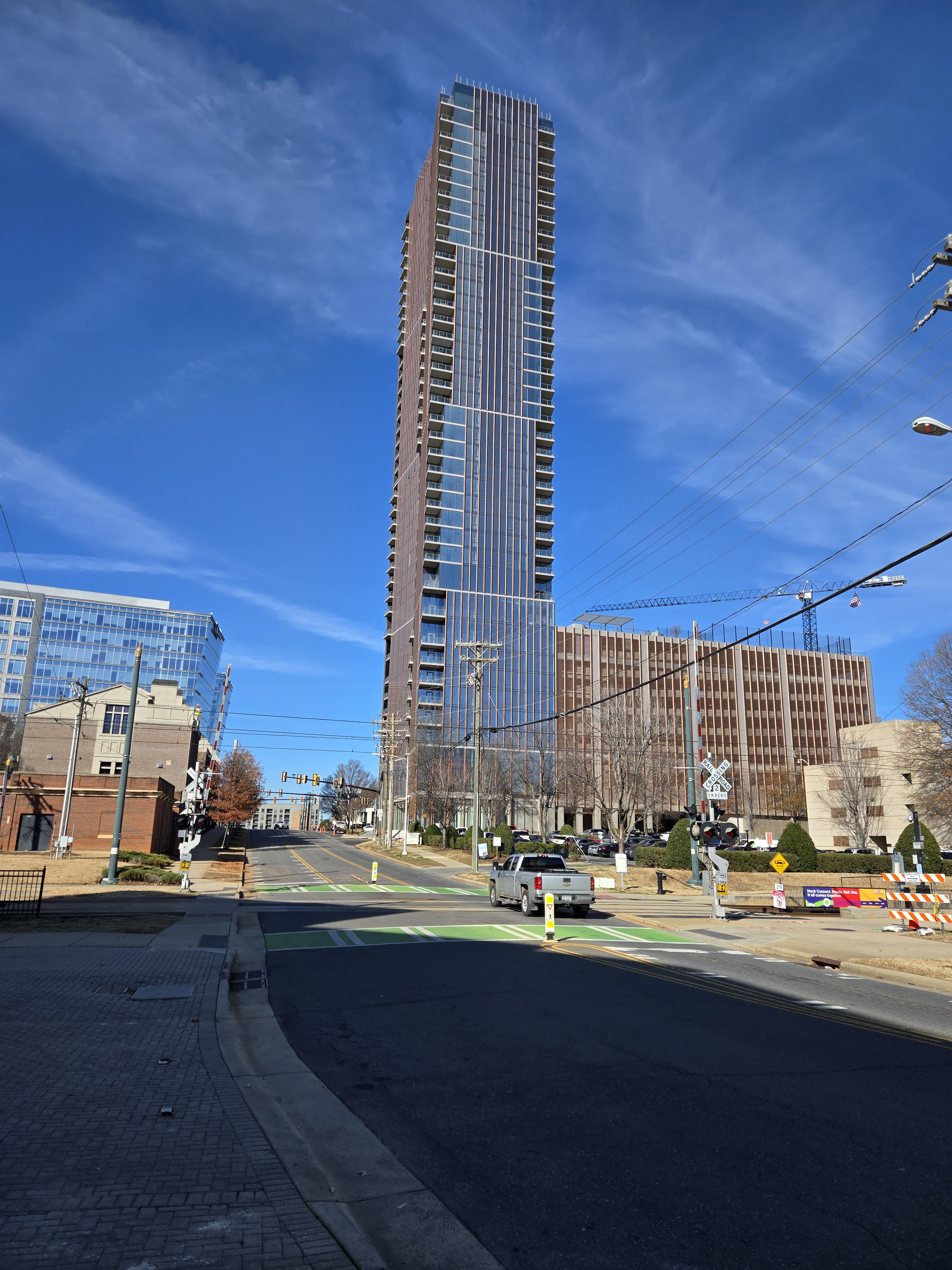
The Vivian, Charlotte's tallest building outside of Uptown.

== Demographics ==
Based on recent American Community Survey data and neighborhood-level aggregations, South End has an estimated residential population of approximately 18,000 to 19,000 residents as of the mid-2020s.

The neighborhood’s population density has increased substantially since 2010 due to the construction of multifamily residential buildings. Housing stock in South End is predominantly composed of apartments and condominiums, with relatively few single-family homes. A majority of housing units are renter-occupied.

South End’s population has a younger median age than Charlotte overall, with most residents between the ages of 25 and 44. Average household size is smaller than the citywide average, reflecting a high proportion of one- and two-person households.

Median household income in South End is higher than the Charlotte citywide median, and a large share of residents hold bachelor’s degrees or higher. Employment among residents is concentrated in professional, technical, financial, and managerial occupations.

Racial and ethnic composition data indicate that non-Hispanic White residents make up a plurality of the population, followed by Black or African American, Asian, Hispanic or Latino, and multiracial residents. Demographic composition has changed over time alongside redevelopment and increased residential density.

== Economy ==
=== Corporate ===
South End contains a growing concentration of office space, primarily in mid- and high-rise mixed-use developments constructed since the 2000s. Much of the commercial activity is oriented toward professional services, technology, consulting, and financial services firms. Several national and multinational companies maintain their headquarters or regional headquarters in the neighborhood, including LendingTree, Lowe's, Krispy Kreme, Dimensional Fund Advisors, Brightspeed, Allstate, and Ernst & Young. Coworking operators, including WeWork, also maintain locations within the neighborhood.

The 10 East office tower, completed in the mid-2020s, represents one of the largest recent office developments in South End. In 2025, Coinbase announced plans to establish an office in the building, adding to the area’s technology and financial services presence.

=== Retail ===
Retail and hospitality constitute a significant component of South End’s economy. The neighborhood contains a high density of restaurants, bars, breweries, and small retail establishments, many of which are clustered along South Boulevard and the Charlotte Rail Trail, a multi-use path that runs parallel to the LYNX Blue Line light rail.

South End has been a focal point for Charlotte’s brewery industry, with multiple craft breweries operating in the area over time. However, turnover among hospitality businesses has been common, reflecting broader trends in the food and beverage sector. For example, Resident Culture Brewing closed its South End taproom in 2025, while other restaurant and bar concepts have opened or announced plans to locate in new mixed-use developments.

The Design District is a mixed-use retail and dining area that occupies former industrial mill buildings along Camden Street and adjacent blocks. The district includes local boutiques, food and beverage establishments, and a variety of tenants, including Abercrombie & Fitch, Jeni's Splendid Ice Creams, and Shake Shack, reflecting South End’s role as a retail destination within Charlotte. Retail offerings include locally owned boutiques, fitness studios, and service-oriented businesses, with limited presence of national big-box retailers. The neighborhood’s retail mix is influenced by its residential density, transit access, and proximity to Uptown Charlotte.

== Transportation ==
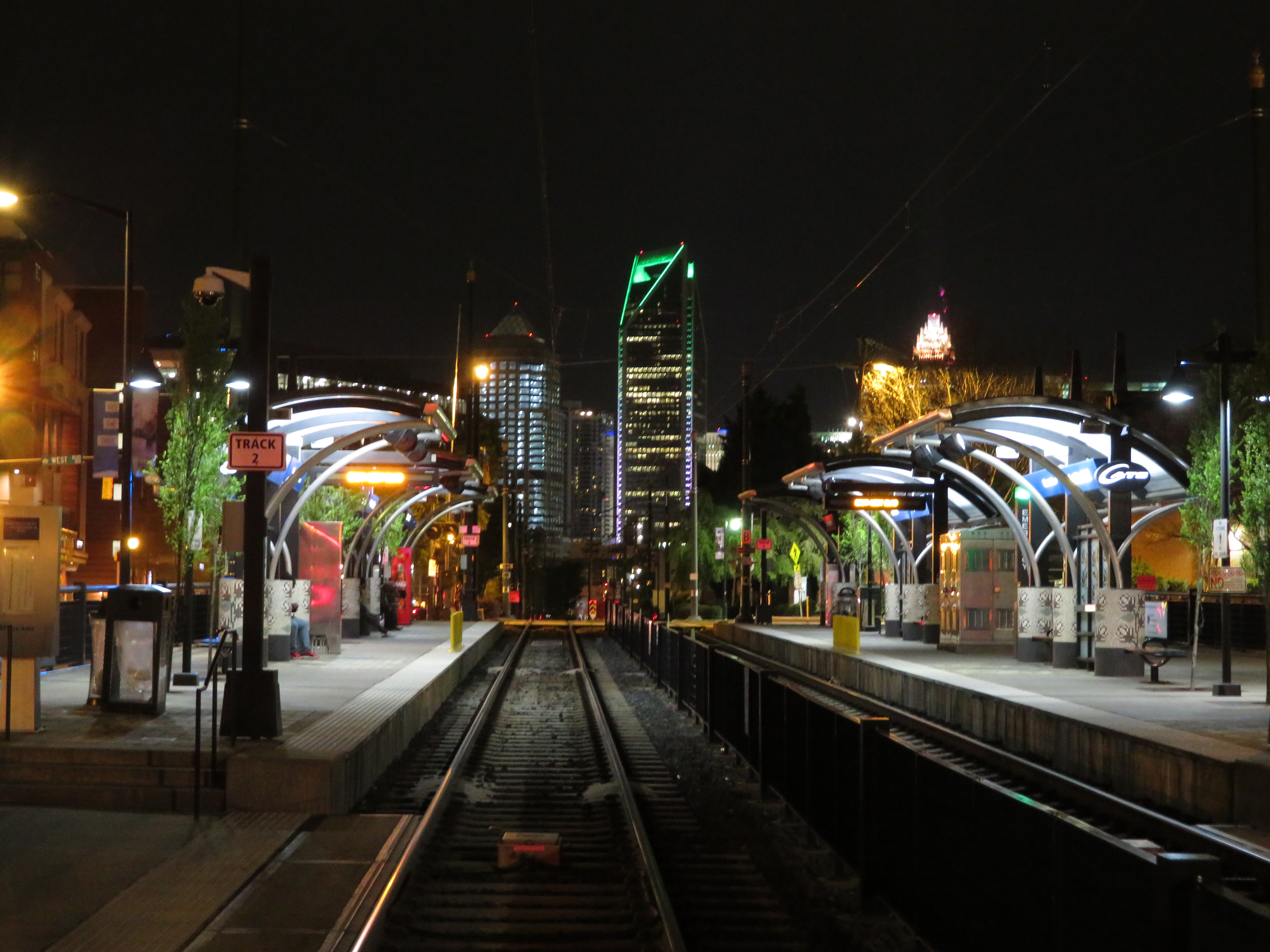
The East/West Boulevard station facing Uptown.

South End is served by multiple stations on the Charlotte Area Transit System's LYNX Blue Line, providing light rail service to Uptown Charlotte and other parts of the city. The Charlotte Rail Trail runs through the neighborhood, supporting pedestrian and bicycle travel. Planned infrastructure improvements include additional transit stations and streetscape upgrades.

=== Charlotte Trolley ===
The Historic Charlotte Trolley Museum is located in the neighborhood and is run by Charlotte Trolley, Inc., a non-profit organization. Originally, Charlotte offered electric streetcar service from May 20, 1891, to March 14, 1938. Later in the century, Charlotte Trolley, Inc. began buying up the old trolley cars which had come to a state of disrepair.

Charlotte Trolley, Inc. began partnering with the Charlotte Area Transit System (CATS) to integrate the vintage trolley service with the rest of Charlotte-Mecklenburg's extensive transit network. Light rail tracks were constructed in 2003 that ran from Atherton Mill in South End to 9th Street uptown. Service was halted in the early 2005 when a new track system began construction for the LYNX Blue Line. Service resumed on April 20, 2008, but has since been discontinued.
