= Charlotte Area Transit System =

Public transit authority for North Carolina, US

Overview
- Locale: Charlotte Metropolitan Area
- Transit type: Light rail; Streetcar; Bus; Bus rapid transit
- Number of lines: 69 (bus and rail combined)
- Number of stations: 3,628 (bus and rail combined)
- Daily ridership: 50,700 (weekdays, Q2 2026)
- Annual ridership: 15,683,300 (2025)
- Chief executive: Brent Cagle
- Headquarters: 300 East Trade Street, Charlotte
- Website: https://charlottenc.gov/cats/Pages/default.aspx

Operation
- Began operation: 1999

The Charlotte Area Transit System (CATS) is the agency responsible for public transportation in the Charlotte metropolitan area. Established in 1999, CATS operates bus and rail transit services in Mecklenburg County and surrounding areas. CATS is governed by the Metropolitan Transit Commission and is operated as a department of the City of Charlotte. In 2025, the system had a ridership of 15,683,300, or about 50,700 per weekday as of the second quarter of 2026.

== History ==
=== Origins ===
Prior to 1976, public transportation in Charlotte was entirely privatized. Trolleys operated in the city from 1891 until 1938. Privately operated bus routes also ran in Charlotte until 1976.

In 1976, the City of Charlotte began operating bus routes under the Charlotte Transit brand, which operated from 1976 until CATS was founded in 2000. (Charlotte Transit and the Charlotte Area Transit System are not to be confused despite the similarity in name.) Charlotte Transit operated almost entirely local bus routes, with the exception of two express routes. As the Charlotte metro area's population grew rapidly, the bus service operated by Charlotte Transit proved to be inadequate. In 1998, a Mecklenburg County referendum was approved by citizens that enacted a 0.5% sales tax increase to improve public transportation in the area. The Metropolitan Transit Commission (MTC) was created as a result of the vote, leading to the consolidation of Charlotte Transit and the MTC in 2000 as the Charlotte Area Transit System, creating CATS as it is today.

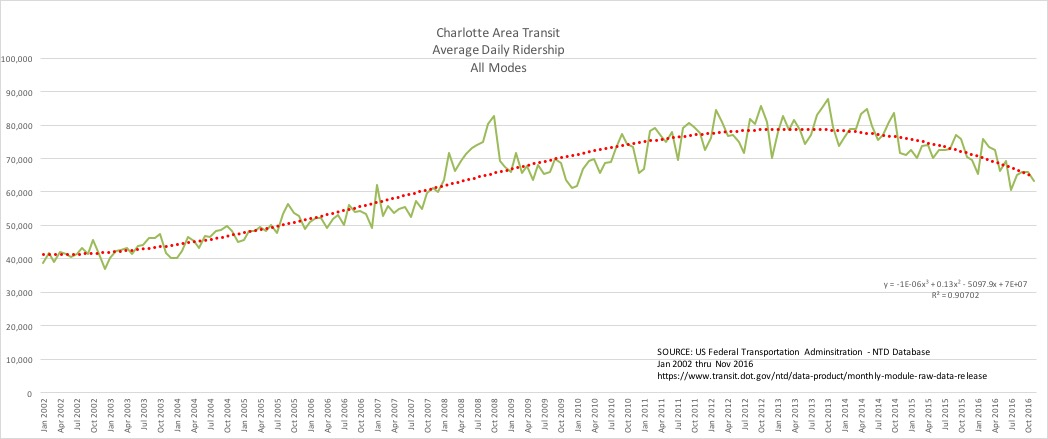
Charlotte Area Transit, Average Daily Ridership, All Modes, 2002–2016

=== 2000–2006: early years ===
After the founding of CATS, more express routes were added to the edges of Mecklenburg County and local bus service was expanded, especially to the fast-growing southern areas of Charlotte. Some commuter/express routes were also initiated outside Mecklenburg County. CATS also expanded bus infrastructure throughout the area during this period. In 2005, CATS built three community transit bus centers to supplement the central Charlotte Transportation Center in Uptown Charlotte. The centers were built in SouthPark (inside the SouthPark Mall parking facility), Eastland (at the old Eastland mall), and at Rosa Parks Place in the Wilson Heights neighborhood north of Uptown. As a result of CATS' expansion during its early years, transit ridership in the Charlotte metropolitan area increased 55 percent, largely due to the expansion of express bus services.

=== 2006–2015: the advent of rail ===
CATS chief Ron Tober began the planning process for what would become the Lynx Blue Line in the early 2000s. Under Tober's leadership, the MTC adopted the 2030 Transit Corridor System Plan in 2006. The initial plan called for the "Red Line" commuter rail with service to Northern Mecklenburg County, the Blue Line, the CityLynx Gold Line streetcar, and a busway along the route of what is now planned to be the Lynx Silver Line. In 2007, the initial portion of the Blue Line opened, connecting the Uptown, South End, Scaleybark, Tyvola, and Arrowood neighborhoods. The initial phase of the Blue Line spurred an explosion of development along the rail corridor, particularly in South End. Shortly after the Blue Line opened, CEO Ron Tober, who had led CATS since its inception, retired.

After Tober's departure, CATS hired Carolyn Flowers, who had previously headed the bus system in Los Angeles County. During Flowers' tenure, the transit system pushed ahead with the Gold Line and Blue Line extension projects in the wake of the Great Recession. In 2014, Flowers resigned to take a Federal Transit Administration position. John M. Lewis Jr. was then hired as the new head of the transit system.

After the success of the Blue Line, CATS reversed course on its initial plans to expand bus service to Matthews and the airport, instead planning for a second light rail line, the Lynx Silver Line, that would travel southeast to Matthews and west to Charlotte Douglas International Airport and across the Catawba River to Belmont.

=== 2015–present: further expansion ===
In 2015, the first phase of the CityLynx Gold Line streetcar opened. The initial line connected the Charlotte Transportation Center in Uptown to Hawthorne Lane and 5th Street, through the First Ward and Cherry neighborhoods. The first phase of the Gold Line utilized retro trolley streetcars, while future phases will incorporate Siemens S70 streetcar vehicles. In 2018, the Blue Line extension opened, connecting the existing Blue Line to the University of North Carolina at Charlotte, connecting the University City, NoDa, Optimist Park, Plaza Midwood, and Belmont neighborhoods. on June 30 2022, the gold line was completed, this has extend the existing line to Sunnyside Avenue in Plaza Midwood and French Street by Johnson C. Smith University. In September 2024, the city of Charlotte voted in approval of the purchase of the rail corridor for the Red Line from Norfolk Southern and a sales tax increase to support operations. The Red Line project, an integral piece of the 2030 System Plan, has run into significant headwinds due to disagreements with Norfolk Southern, which owns the tracks the Red Line was planned to operate on, and funding concerns.

CATS is currently in the planning and design stages for the Lynx Silver Line, a multibillion-dollar east–west light rail line that will run from Matthews through Uptown Charlotte and west to Charlotte Douglas International Airport and across the Catawba River to Belmont. The line, projected to open in 2030, will connect to the Blue Line at 11th Street and the future intermodal Charlotte Gateway Station.

== Bus ==
CATS bus service primarily serves Mecklenburg County, with service in Charlotte, Davidson, Huntersville, Cornelius, Matthews, Pineville, and Mint Hill. Limited local and express service operated by CATS also extends to Iredell County, Gaston County, and Union County.

CATS operates local routes within the City of Charlotte and Mecklenburg County, with the majority of those multiple-stop routes serving the Charlotte Transportation Center in Uptown. Other routes that do not serve Uptown mainly connect directly between Lynx rail stations and outlying neighborhoods. Three community transit centers in different parts of the city were built in the mid-2000s: the Eastland Community Transit Center in East Charlotte located near the now-closed Eastland Mall, the SouthPark Community Transit Center in South Charlotte located under SouthPark Mall, and the Rosa Parks Place Community Transit Center in North Charlotte located near Johnson C. Smith University.

Express buses in the CATS system serve Union County, far northern Mecklenburg County, the Lake Norman area, and Gastonia.

CATS operates one bus rapid transit line, the Sprinter service from the CTC to Charlotte Douglas International Airport. This center city to airport link will be replaced by the Lynx Silver Line upon its completion.

CATS also operates the Special Transportation Service (STS), a paratransit service which provides transportation to people with disabilities certified as eligible based on the Americans with Disabilities Act guidelines. STS provides service during the same times and in the same locations as the fixed route bus service.

During a typical week, CATS buses carry about 190,000 riders.

=== Active fleet ===
CATS operates with a fleet of 323 buses on 73 bus routes.

Image	Builder and model name	Fleet Series (Year Built)	Length	Engine source	Notes
	MCI; D4000	501–510 (2001)	40 ft (12 m)	Diesel	Express Route Only Coach
	MCI; D4500CT	1501–1502 (2016); 1503–1511 (2017)	45 ft (14 m)	Diesel	Express Route Only Coach
	Gillig; BRT (G27D102N4)	961–968 (2007); 400–410 (2009); 1001–1020 (2009); 1021–1043 (2011); 1044–1071 (2012); 1072–1073 (2014); 1074–1083 (2015); 1087–1094 (2017)	40 ft (12 m)	Diesel	
	Gillig; BRT HEV (G19D102N4)	2501–2502 (2005)	40 ft (12 m)	Diesel-Electric Hybrid	First hybrid buses added to fleet.
	Gillig; BRT HEV (G30D102N4)	2901–2905 (2009); 2111–2116 (2011); 2117–2120 (2013); 1084–1086 (2017); 2121–2128 (2017)	40 ft (12 m)	Diesel-Electric Hybrid	The 2901–2905 buses were assigned to airport "Sprinter" service.
	Gillig; BRT Plus	1088–1096 (2018); 2129–2144 (2018)	40 ft (12 m)	Diesel	
	Gillig; BRT 29' (G27E102R2)	630–636 (2006); 637–655 (2007); 656–658 (2009); 659–665 (2012); 667–669 (2012)	29 ft (8.8 m)	Diesel	These buses operate on community shuttles and low-ridership routes.
	Gillig; BRT HEV 29' (G30E102R2)	670–675 (2013); 2670–2680 (2013); 676–680 (2014)	29 ft (8.8 m)	Diesel-Electric Hybrid	These buses operate on community shuttles and low-ridership routes.

== Rail ==
CATS operates two rail lines under the "Lynx" (stylized as "LYNX") system umbrella. Announced on February 22, 2006, the name fits in with the city's cat theme (the NFL team is the Carolina Panthers and the NBA team was known as the Charlotte Bobcats when the name was chosen); also, "Lynx" is a homophone of "links", and was mainly chosen because the light rail is about "connectivity." The color scheme of the rail cars is silver, with black and blue accents and gold around the "Lynx" logo to tie in the history of the Charlotte region being home to the first major U.S. Gold Rush.

CATS rail service first began on June 28, 2004 with the Charlotte Trolley, operating three Birney-style replica streetcars between Atherton Mill and 9th Street. In 2006, the trolley service was suspended to allow the line's conversion to light-rail. Resumed on a limited schedule in 2008, the heritage streetcar line was discontinued two years later on June 28, 2010.

=== Lynx Blue Line ===
The Lynx Blue Line is a 19.3-mile (31.1 km) light rail in Charlotte, North Carolina. Opened on November 24, 2007 and hailed as the first major rapid rail service of any kind in North Carolina, the line has 15 stations and ran 9.6 miles (15.4 km) between I-485/South Boulevard, near Pineville, and 7th Street, in Uptown Charlotte; the line was partly shared with the Charlotte Trolley from 2008–2010. On March 16, 2018, a 9.7-mile (15.6 km) extension was opened that added 11 stations north from 7th Street to UNC Charlotte–Main, at the University of North Carolina at Charlotte The line uses the Siemens S70 as rolling stock, which connects its 26 stations.

=== CityLynx Gold Line ===
The CityLynx Gold Line is a 4-mile modern streetcar route that runs from French Street to Sunnyside Avenue through central Charlotte. When the final phase is completed the line will run from Rosa Parks Place Community Transit Center through Uptown Charlotte and down Central Avenue, terminating at Eastland Community Transit Center. A Federal Urban Circulator Grant was awarded in July 2010, allowing construction of phase 1.

The initial 1.5-mile (2.4 km) segment of the line commenced service on July 14, 2015. This section runs from the Charlotte Transportation Center / Arena station to Hawthorne Lane & 5th Street. The initial phase utilized replica Birney trolley cars. After several delays, the second 2.5-mile (4.0 km) segment opened on August 30, 2021, extending service to French Street in Biddleville and Sunnyside Avenue. The trolley cars were then replaced with Siemens S700 streetcar vehicles. Phase 3, which would extend service north along Beatties Ford Road to Rosa Parks Place Community Transit Center and east along Central Avenue to Eastland Community Transit Center, is still in the planning stages.

=== Current fleet ===
CATS currently operates two models of rail cars, Siemens S700 and S70, with a fleet total of 48 vehicles:

Image	Type	Manufacturer	Fleet #	Delivered	Quantity	Assigned lines	Notes
	S70	Siemens	101–116 (Series 1); 201–204 (Series 2); 301–322 (Series 3)	2006–2017	42	Lynx Blue Line	
	S700 (Note: These were model S70 when the order was placed, but in 2020 were retroactively rebranded as model S700 by Siemens.)	Siemens	401–406	2019–2020	6	CityLynx Gold Line	

==== Siemens S70 ====
The vehicles are 93.6 ft (28.5 m) long and 8.7 ft (2.65 m) wide, with each having an empty weight of 99,500 lb (45,100 kilograms). Each vehicle contains 68 seats and has a maximum capacity of 230 passengers complete with four wheelchair spaces and four bike racks. Maximum operational speed is 66 miles per hour (106 km/h), with a top speed of 71.5 miles per hour (115.1 km/h); power comes from a 750-volt overhead wire. When not in use, the vehicles are stored at the South Boulevard Light Rail Facility, located along South Boulevard, between the New Bern and Scaleybark stations in the Sedgefield neighborhood. The facility is approximately 92,000 square feet (8,547.1 m^{2}), and houses the Lynx rail maintenance staff, operations staff and the Rail Operations Control Center. Officially dedicated on June 23, 2007, the facility contains 2.5 miles (4.0 km) of track and 5,200 ties.

In January 2004, CATS began the process of accepting bids for construction of the system's vehicles. Original estimates for the vehicles was $3.5 million per car with the firms Bombardier, Siemens and Kinki Sharyo bidding for the final contract. The $52 million contract was awarded to Siemens on February 25, 2004. The original order of 16 S70 Avanto vehicles, similar to those in operation on the METRORail system in Houston, Texas, was delivered between 2006 and 2007; these cars are numbered 101–116. Car 101 arrived via flatbed truck on Friday, June 23, 2006, from the Siemens facility in Florin, California. Testing of the vehicles began in August 2006 along a 1.3-mile (2.1 km) stretch of track between Tremont Avenue and the light rail maintenance facility off South Boulevard. During the testing phase, each car logged 1,000 miles (1,600 km) to test the acceleration, braking and overall performance for each vehicle.

With an option in place to purchase up to an additional 25 vehicles, and better than expected ridership, in May 2008 CATS announced the purchase of four additional S70 vehicles to expand the fleet's capacity beyond the existing 16 vehicles. The vehicles cost $3.8 million each and were delivered by Siemens between January and March 2010. In 2012, after only four years of operation, the original 16 vehicles underwent significant maintenance at the Siemens facility in California for an estimated cost of $400,000 each, having run by then for nearly 300,000 miles (480,000 km).

In January 2014, CATS announced it would buy 22 more Siemens S70 light-rail vehicles for the Blue Line Extension at a cost of $96.2 million. This purchase allowed CATS to have more three-car trains on the existing Blue Line. The first car was delivered in late October 2014, and the last in spring 2017. After delivery of the 22 additional S70 cars, the fleet had a total of 42 light rail vehicles. The first series is numbered 101–116, the second series 201–204 (originally 117–120; renumbered 2018), and the third series 301–322 (originally 121–142). From late 2021 to at least 2025, the original (Series 1) vehicles will undergo extensive mid-life overhauls in Sacramento at a total cost of $30–50 million. Vehicles will be sent to California two at a time; overhauling each one will take approximately six to nine months.

==== Siemens S700 ====
Six Siemens S700 low-floor streetcars service the Gold line. They were delivered between August 2019 and April 2020 and are numbered 401–406. The vehicles have 56 passenger seats, with a total capacity of 255 passengers, and have four wheelchair spaces and two bicycle racks. They are 85.25 ft (26 m) long by 8.67 ft (2.64 m) wide, with each weighing 101,081 lb (45,850 kilograms). Maximum speed is 35 miles per hour (56 km/h), with an operational speed of 25 miles per hour (40 km/h). Their design and color schemes are similar to the vehicles used on the Blue Line. The streetcars are equipped with a hybrid wireless onboard energy storage system (OESS); they draw power from 750V DC overhead wires along most of the line except between Mint Street and the Charlotte Transportation Center, where they run on battery power. The batteries are recharged when the vehicles resume running on-wire.

=== Retired fleet ===
Image	Years in Service	Type	Manufacturer	Fleet #	Delivered	Quantity	Assigned lines	Notes
	2004–2010; 2015–2019	Birney-style replica streetcar	Gomaco Trolley Company	91–93	2004	3	Charlotte Trolley; CityLynx Gold Line	Built in 2003–2004.

Birney-style replica streetcar

Delivered in the fall of 2004, the three heritage streetcars, from Gomaco Trolley Company, were replacements of three non-owned historic streetcars that initially started the Charlotte Trolley in 1988. The streetcars operated along the, grade-separated, Charlotte Trolley from 2004 to 2006 and then on a limited schedule from 2008 to 2010, when the Charlotte Trolley ceased operations. The streetcars were then put back into service during the first phase of the CityLynx Gold Line; from 2015 to 2019, they operated along 1.5-mile (2.4 km) line along Trade Street and Hawthorne Lane. In 2020, the replica trolleys were retired and sold to the Memphis Area Transit Authority (MATA) for $550,000.

Built in Ida Grove, Iowa, they were 48.9 ft (14.9 m) long, 10 ft (3.0 m) wide and 12.9 ft (3.9 m) tall, with a weight of 48,000 lb (22,000 kg), and a crush load of 105 people (48 sitting and 57 standing). The exterior is painted green and yellow, while the interior was wood, including oak, cherry, birch, and plywood. Each streetcar had an accessible-compliant integrated wheelchair lift and air conditioning. Running equipment was a 30HP General Electric traction motor, utilizing 650 V DC via overhead lines. The streetcars had a top speed of 30 mph (48 km/h).

== Transit centers ==
CATS currently operates four transit centers, with a fifth, Charlotte Gateway Station, currently under construction. The transit centers operate as a hub-and-spoke system, with the Charlotte Transportation Center being its center and Eastland, Rosa Parks Place, and SouthPark as mini-hubs in their respective areas.

=== Eastland Community Transit Center ===
Eastland Community Transit Center

General information
- Location: 5407 Central Avenue; Charlotte, North Carolina; United States
- Coordinates: 35.20815°N 80.75372°W
- Bus operators: CATS

Construction
- Structure type: At-grade
- Cycle facilities: Bicycle racks
- Accessible: Yes

History
- Opened: October 2006
Location

The Eastland Community Transit Center is a neighborhood-sized transit hub located at the former Eastland Mall site, along Central Avenue. The 1.5-acre (0.61 ha) site includes an open-air plaza and space to accommodate 8-10 small and regular-sized buses.

=== Rosa Parks Place Community Transit Center ===
Rosa Parks Place Community Transit Center

General information
- Location: 2811 Beatties Ford Road; Charlotte, North Carolina; United States
- Coordinates: 35.27351°N 80.85462°W
- Bus operators: CATS

Construction
- Structure type: At-grade
- Cycle facilities: Bicycle racks
- Accessible: Yes

History
- Opened: 2006
Location

The Rosa Parks Place Community Transit Center is a neighborhood-sized transit hub located at the Mecklenburg County Health Department, at the intersection of Rosa Park Place and Beatties Ford Road. The facility is named after Rosa Parks, who was an American activist in the civil rights movement best known for her pivotal role in the Montgomery bus boycott.

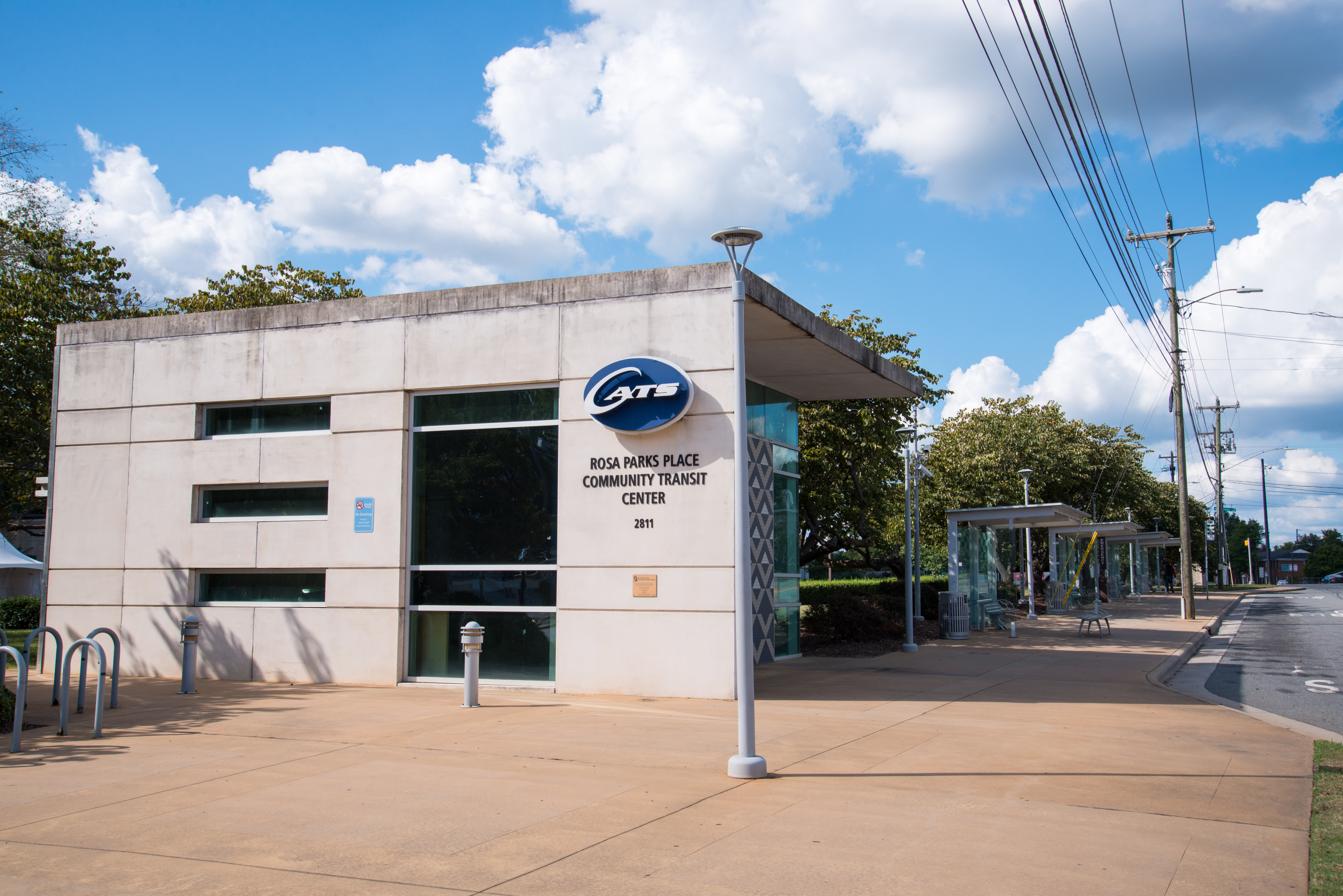
Rosa Parks Place in 2021

=== SouthPark Community Transit Center ===
SouthPark Community Transit Center

General information
- Location: 4400 Sharon Road; Charlotte, North Carolina; United States
- Coordinates: 35°09′12″N 80°49′53″W
- Bus operators: CATS

Construction
- Structure type: Underground
- Accessible: Yes

History
- Opened: December 2004
Location

The SouthPark Community Transit Center is a neighborhood-sized transit hub located underneath SouthPark Mall. The facility was the first of its kind, for CATS, to operate as a "mini-hub" for the SouthPark neighborhood and surrounding area. The facility includes artwork from George Handy of Asheville; called Migration North and Migration South, they are made from corrugated wood.

== Future service ==
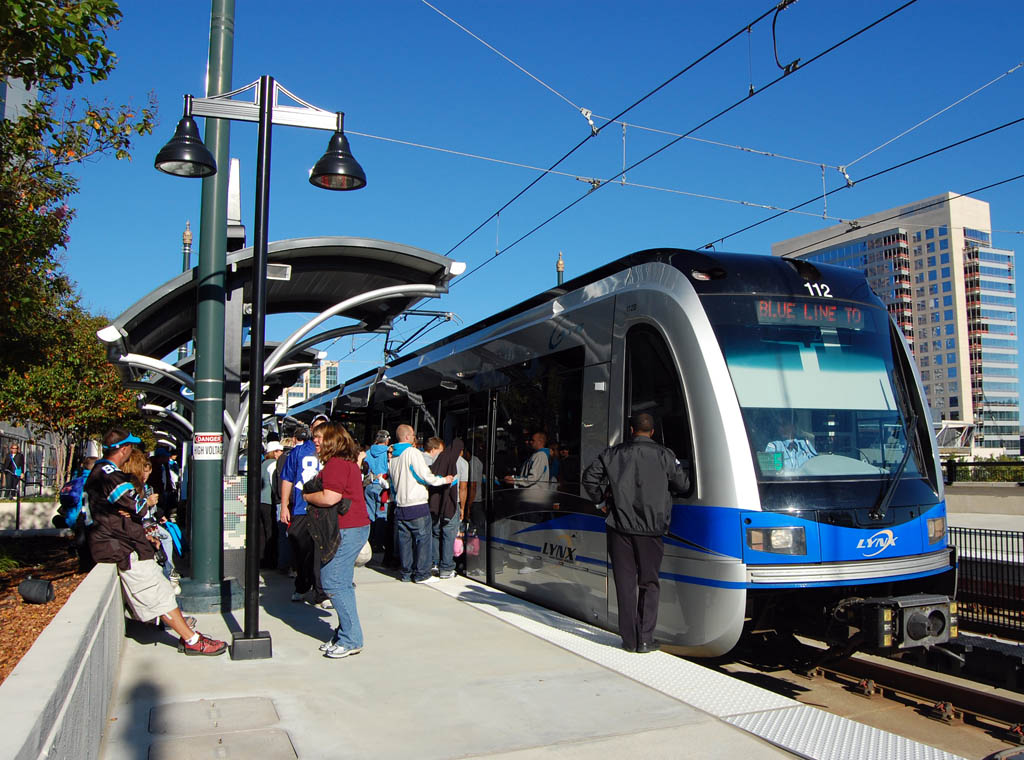
Boarding a southbound train at Brooklyn Village station

Future expansion includes plans for light rail, streetcars and bus rapid transit along the corridors in the 2030 Transit Corridor System Plan adopted in 2006 by Metropolitan Transit Commission (MTC). On May 6, 2013, a 30-member transit funding task force released a draft report in which they estimated it would cost $3.3 billion to build the remaining transit corridors, and $1.7 billion to operate and maintain the lines through 2024. To fund the build-out by sales taxes alone would require a 0.78 cent increase in the sales tax, which would need to be approved by the state General Assembly. The committee recommended any sales tax increase be limited to 0.5 cent and other methods used to raise funds; some suggested methods included:

- Using the federal Transportation Infrastructure Finance and Innovation Act (TFIA) to quickly begin construction. TFIA loans could pay for 33% of the streetcar project and 30% of the rapid transit line along Independence Boulevard. It could allow CATS to begin collecting new property taxes from projects built along the rail line, which could be used to pay off the loans.
- Expanding advertising on train cars and buses, possibly selling naming rights and sponsorships.
- Entering into partnership with a private company to help finance part of the project.

Although build-out of the entire system has been estimated for completion by 2030, by July 2015, the Charlotte Area Transit System reported it lacked the funds to support any future transit projects apart from the already budgeted 2.5-mile long Phase 2 segment of the CityLYNX Gold Line.

CATS has entered into a partnership with Duke Energy to pilot the use of electric buses. 18 BEBs from three manufacturers will be used over 18 months.

=== Proposed ===
==== Silver Line ====
The Lynx Silver Line is a proposed 29-mile (47 km) east-west light rail line that would connect the outlying cities and towns of Belmont, Matthews, Stallings and Indian Trail to Uptown Charlotte and the Charlotte Douglas International Airport using its 30 stations. Originally setup as two separate projects known as the Southeast Corridor and West Corridor, they were merged in 2019 by the Metropolitan Transit Commission. Tentative opening date in 2037.

==== Red Line ====
The Lynx Red Line is a proposed 25-mile (40 km) commuter rail service routed along the existing Norfolk Southern O-Line right-of-way, connecting the towns in northern Mecklenburg and southern Iredell counties to Uptown Charlotte, North Carolina. However, several issues had arisen that included ineligibility for federal funding and Norfolk Southern refusal to allow access to its right-of-way. In 2019, after a reevaluation of the entire corridor, the CATS decided to move forward with a bus rapid transit (BRT) service instead, the I-77 Bus Rapid Transit, and shelve the commuter rail service, which was met with frustration by various city leaders and residents impacted by it. However, in June 2024, it was announced that the City of Charlotte plans to purchase a section of the O-Line between Charlotte and Mooresville, NC for commuter rail service, thus placing the commuter rail option for the Red Line back into consideration. But a few weeks after the letter of understanding was made, local lawmakers passed a law stating that the city of Charlotte cannot buy land outside Mecklenburg County without the approval of each county and municipality with the railway that is being acquired, which could possibly limit potential expansion outside of Davidson.

==== Microtransit ====
CATS is currently working to launch microtransit in 2024, covering the University and North End zones, as well as a zone including Charlotte, Cornelius, Davidson, and Huntersville. This is proposed to replace the North Meck Village Rider service covering the latter three cities. A pilot program was deployed in 2022.

== Ridership data ==
Year	Passenger trips
2019	24,278,653
2018	22,516,607
2017	24,985,270
2016	26,248,940
2015	27,165,943
2014	29,438,356
2013	28,712,105
2010	24,355,191
2009	26,034,078
2008	23,199,350
2007	19,757,737
2006	19,156,590
2005	17,773,753
2004	20,875,635
2003	18,888,550
2002	16,587,199
2001	14,182,463
2000	13,464,745

- 1997–2005: Service Consumption Versus Costs: (costs adjusted for inflation at 3.5% per year)
  Ridership (unlinked trips): +52%
  Operational cost per passenger trip: +66%
  Operational cost per vehicle mile: +6%
  Operational cost per vehicle hour: +16%

Source: CATS 2010 Annual Report, National Transit Database
