= List of Lynx public art artists =

Since 2002, the Charlotte Area Transit System (CATS) has incorporated public art in various capital improvement projects. Encouraged by the Federal Transit Administration policy circular 9400.1A, the Art in Transit program is to add visual quality with a profound impact on transit patrons and the community at large. CATS commits 1% of design and construction costs for the integration of art, which includes stations and surrounding areas, park and ride lots, transportation centers, maintenance facilities, and passenger amenities.

The following list are artists that have contributed to the Art in Transit program.

Artist	Work	Location	Year	Summary	Image
Alice Adams	Landscape and hardscape	Lynx Blue Line	2007	Responsible for the design of the scoring patterns marking stations called Evergreen Encyclopedia and Celtic Calendar. Additionally, she is responsible for the relief images placed on walls along the route.	
Maria Artemis	Tectonic Suite	Parkwood	2018	Station artwork includes boulders, granite benches, and laminated windscreen glass.	
Nancy Blum	Dogwood	Lynx Blue Line	2007	24 bronze drinking fountain basins, located in 13 stations.	
Carolyn Braaksma	Walls & Bridges	Lynx Blue Line	2018	Responsible for all walls, bridges and piers along the Blue Line extension. Creating 17 different designs, including the Calico Kudzu on various walls, the leaf railing and color on the Old Concord Road bridge and the Pitcher Plant Bridge Piers.	
Susan Brenner	Red Tree	JW Clay Boulevard/UNC Charlotte	2018	Elevator tower.	
Susan Brenner	Waterfall	University City Boulevard	2018	Elevator tower.	
Shaun Cassidy	Ebb & Flow	McCullough	2018	Etched windscreen glass, passenger shelter columns, art benches and fencing.	
Shaun Cassidy	Mosaics and windscreens	7th Street	2007	Gingko leaf design and mosaic columns cladding features a four-color overlapping leaf pattern.	
Shaun Cassidy	Seating fabric and ceiling art	Lynx Blue Line	2007	Design of both the seat fabric and ceiling graphics in each Siemens S70.	
Shaun Cassidy	Track fencing	Lynx Blue Line	2007	Design and fabrication of 40 sections of fencing to be utilized at 10 station platforms. Each section will resemble a leaf from a tree species native to the neighborhood where the station is located. Additionally, the tree veins on each leaf will be designed to replicate the street layout of the neighborhood where the station is located.	
Jackie Chang	(T)HERE	JW Clay Boulevard/UNC Charlotte	2018	Stainless steel inlays, laminated windscreen glass, passenger shelter columns.	
Chandra Cox	Locomotion	Sugar Creek	2018	Kinetic finials, orb sculpture, laminated windscreen glass, passenger shelter columns.	
Sharon Dowell	Halcyon Idyll I, Halcyon Idyll II, Coexist	11th St & Brookshire Fwy Underpasses	2018	Murals and signal house wrapping.	
Sharon Dowell	A City of Optimists	25th Street	2018	Mosaics, painted railing and benches, laminated windscreen glass, passenger shelter columns.	
Richard C. Elliott	Tower of Light	Archdale	2007	Acrylic reflectors on elevator tower.	
Darren Goins	The Sun Guided the Road Bike Shelter, The Geometric Abstract Bicycle (on the horizon) Rack	Lynx Blue Line	2018	Bicycle parking at nine stations, eight of which include shelter.	
Hoss Haley	River Rock	Lynx Blue Line	2007	Hand-polished steel and concrete benches located at five stations.	
Doug Hollis	UMBRA	9th Street	2018	Tensile fabric canopies, curved glass windscreens, benches, and blue glass aggregate platform.	
Leticia Huerta	Pavers, mosaics, windscreens	Lynx Blue Line	2007	Design of the platform pavers, mosaic tiles, and the glass etching designs at all 11 stations between the I-485/South Boulevard and Carson stations.	
Mikyoung Kim	The Nexus Project	UNC Charlotte–Main	2018	Stainless steel, programmed lighting, paving, and landscape.	
Andrew Leicester	Bobbins	Charlotte Transportation Center	2007	Brick bridge columns and pavers.	
Ruth Lyons	Welcome to Nodaland	36th Street	2018	Station color, smalti glass mosaic, granite bench, laminated windscreen glass, and passenger canopy columns.	
Anna Murch	UMBRA	9th Street	2018	Tensile fabric canopies, curved glass windscreens, benches, and blue glass aggregate platform.	
Nancy O’Neil	Windscreens	CityLynx Gold Line	2015	Current and historical maps, photos, and manuscripts on glass, on 11 passenger shelters.	
Dennis Oppenheim	Reconstructed Dwelling	Tyvola	2007	Steel, aluminum, wood, vinyl, and lettering.	
Jody Pinto	Light Station	3rd Street/Convention Center	2008	Green and red fiberglass canopies and benches, steel, fluorescent lighting, and paving pattern.	
Susan Page	Coming Home To Cherry	Midtown	2008	A series of portraits, on five passenger shelters, of Cherry residents representing family, community, and education.	
Marek Ranis	Walls and bridge enhancements	Lynx Blue Line	2007	Design and color of Retaining walls and bridge columns in the south corridor.	
Thomas Sayre	Furrow	Scaleybark	2007	Six large concrete and steel sculptures cast from Carolina earth, pays tribute to Scaleybark's agricultural past.	
Paul Sires	Welcome to Nodaland	36th Street	2018	Station color, smalti glass mosaic, granite bench, laminated windscreen glass, and passenger canopy columns.	
Tom Stanley	A Place Called Home	Tom Hunter	2018	Laminated windscreen glass, passenger shelter columns, art benches and fencing.	
Thomas Thoune	Camden Wall	East/West Boulevard	2007	33 mosaic cogs on a 360-foot (110 m) wall.	
Michele Turner	On the Move	Sprinter	2010	Etched glass at passenger shelters along the Sprinter (express bus) route between Uptown Charlotte and Charlotte Douglas International Airport.	
David Wilson	Along the Way	Beatties Ford Road	2013	Collage on glass at six passenger shelters along Beatties Ford Road, between Interstate 485 and LaSalle Street.	
Yuriko Yamaguchi	Dream Keepers	Bland Street	2007	Four small bronze sculptures symbolizing the growth and mystery of our lives.	
