= Old Concord Road station =

Old Concord Road
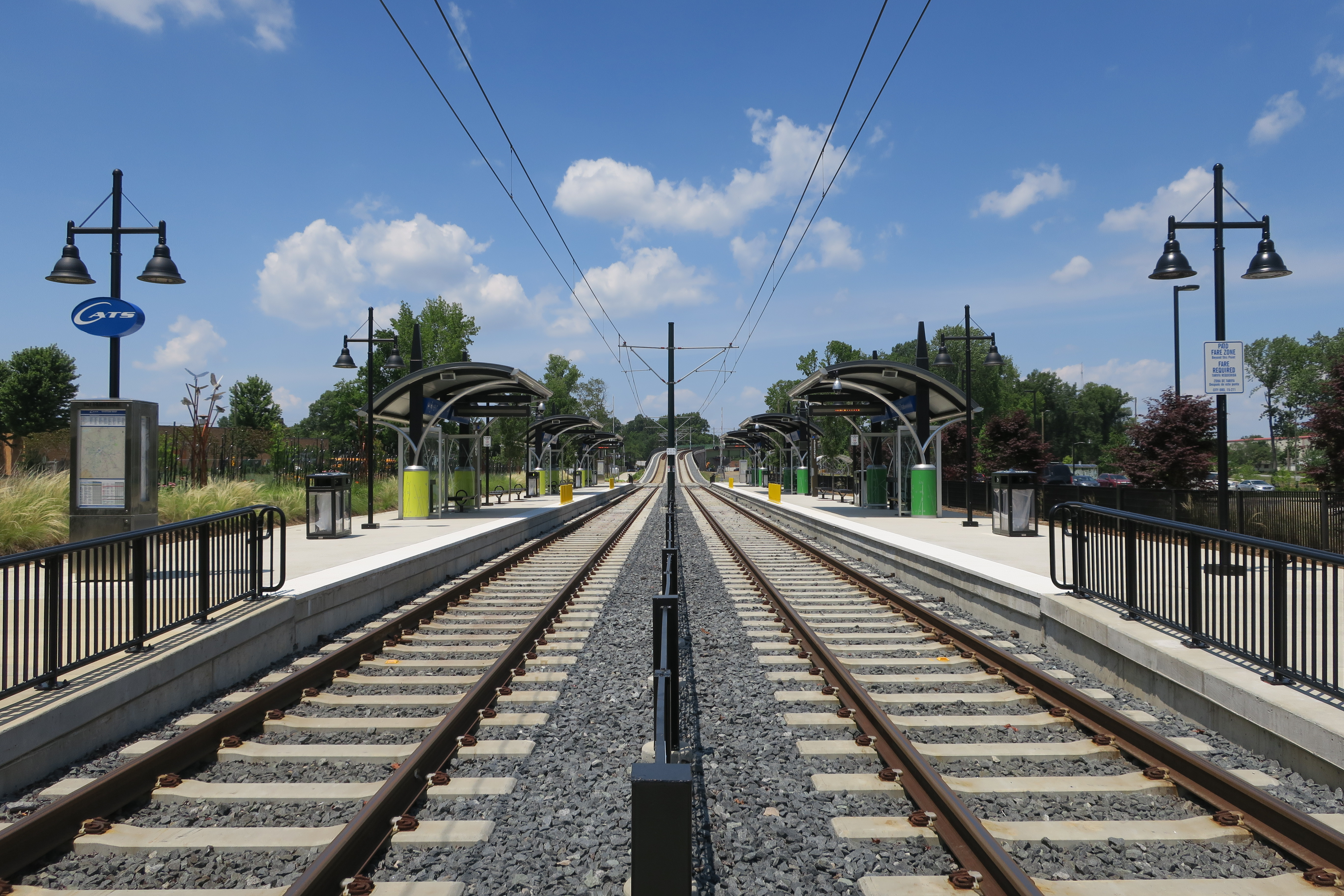
- Platforms and tracks from the south end

General information
- Location: 5442 North Tryon Street; Charlotte, North Carolina; United States
- Coordinates: 35°15′37.13″N 80°46′35.39″W
- Owner: Charlotte Area Transit System
- Platforms: 2 side platforms
- Tracks: 2
- Connections: CATS: 11, 39

Construction
- Structure type: At-grade
- Parking: 332 spaces
- Cycle facilities: Bicycle racks
- Accessible: yes
- Architect: STV Inc.
- Architectural style: Postmodern

History
- Opened: March 16, 2018

Services
Preceding station	CATS	Following station
Sugar Creek toward I-485/South Boulevard	Lynx Blue Line	Tom Hunter toward UNC Charlotte–Main
Location

Old Concord Road is a light rail station on the LYNX Blue Line in the Eastway neighborhood of Charlotte, North Carolina, United States. It opened on March 16, 2018, as part of the Blue Line extension to the UNC Charlotte campus and features a pair of side platforms.
