= Arrowood station =

Light-rail station in Charlotte, North Carolina, USA

Arrowood
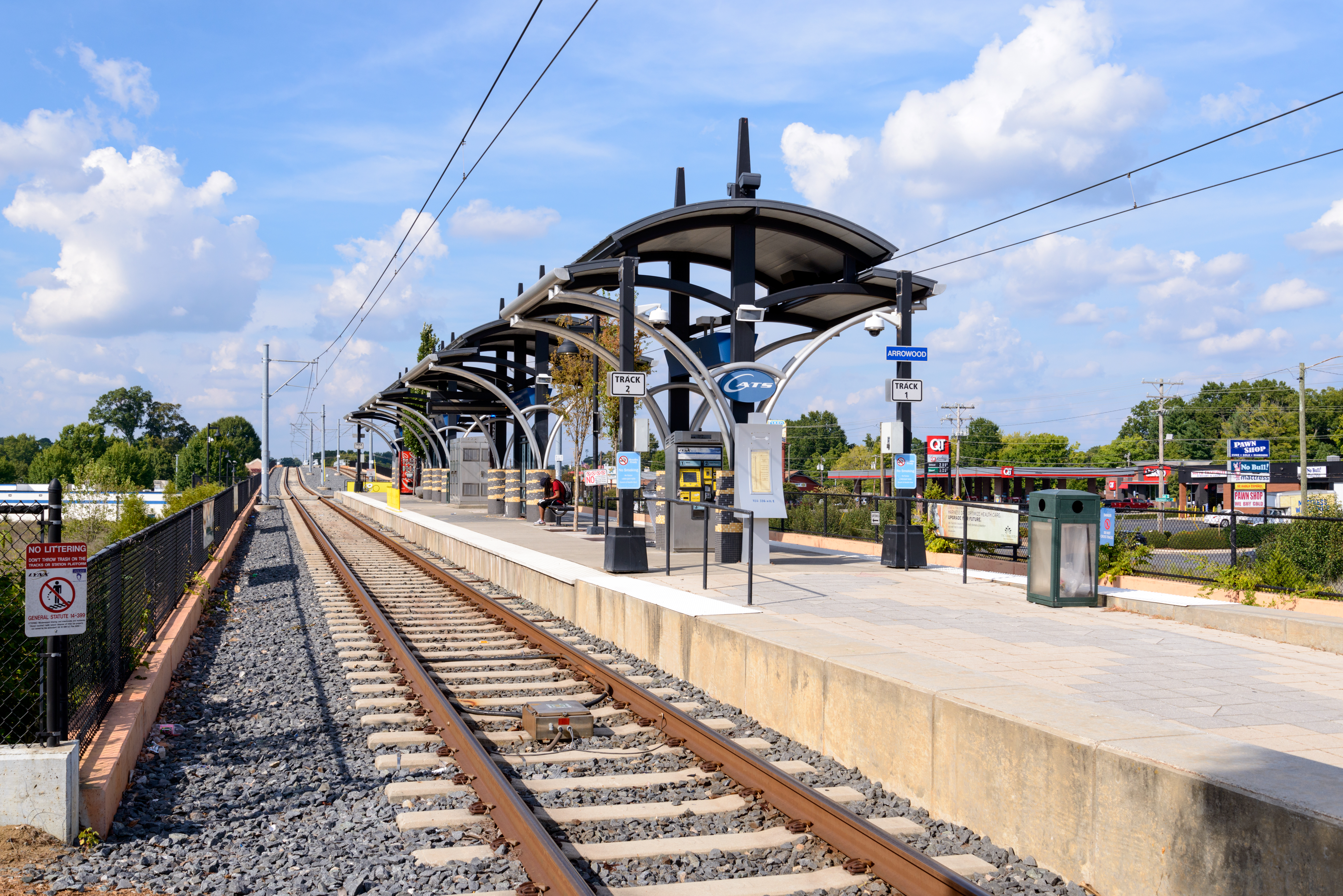

General information
- Location: 7717 England Street; Charlotte, North Carolina; United States
- Coordinates: 35°8′8″N 80°52′35″W
- Owner: Charlotte Area Transit System
- Platforms: 1 island platform
- Tracks: 2
- Bus stands: 4
- Connections: CATS: 24, 56; Megabus

Construction
- Structure type: At-grade
- Parking: 289 spaces
- Cycle facilities: Bicycle racks
- Accessible: yes
- Architect: Ralph Whitehead Associates
- Architectural style: Postmodern

History
- Opened: November 24, 2007

Services
Preceding station	CATS	Following station
Sharon Road West toward I-485/South Boulevard	Lynx Blue Line	Archdale toward UNC Charlotte–Main
Location

Arrowood is a light rail station in Charlotte, North Carolina. The at-grade island platform is a stop along the Lynx Blue Line and serves Montclaire South and Starmount neighborhoods, as well as Central Piedmont Community College's Harper Campus. It also features a 289-space park and ride that includes local bus connections and intercity bus service via Megabus.

== Location ==
The station is located off England Street, between Arrowood Road and Hebron Street; a 630-foot-long (190 m) walkway also connects the station directly with Arrowood Road. Nearby is Marlowe Place and the South Square Marketplace.

== History ==
The station was part of the overall planning and construction of the LYNX Blue Line; starting in 1999, it was approved in February 2000 and construction began on February 26, 2005. The station officially opened for service on Saturday, November 24, 2007, and as part of its opening celebration fares were not collected. Regular service with fare collection commenced on Monday, November 26, 2007.

== Station layout ==
The station consists of one island platform and four covered waiting areas; other amenities include ticket vending machines, emergency call box, and bicycle racks. The station also features several art installations including bas-reliefs entitled Skyrocket Oak, and landscaping entitled Evergreen Encyclopedia by Alice Adams; drinking fountain basins designed to look like dogwoods, the North Carolina state flower, by Nancy Blum; Catawba Pottery motifs on both the pavers and shelters by Leticia Huerta; and the painting of the bridge and retaining walls by Marek Ranis.

Adjacent to the station is the park and ride, which features a 289-space surface parking lot and four bus bays; The station is connected to England Street via Arrowood Station Drive. Parking is free for patrons for either bus or light rail and is limited to 24 hours.
