= McCullough station =

Tram stop in Charlotte, North Carolina, United States

McCullough
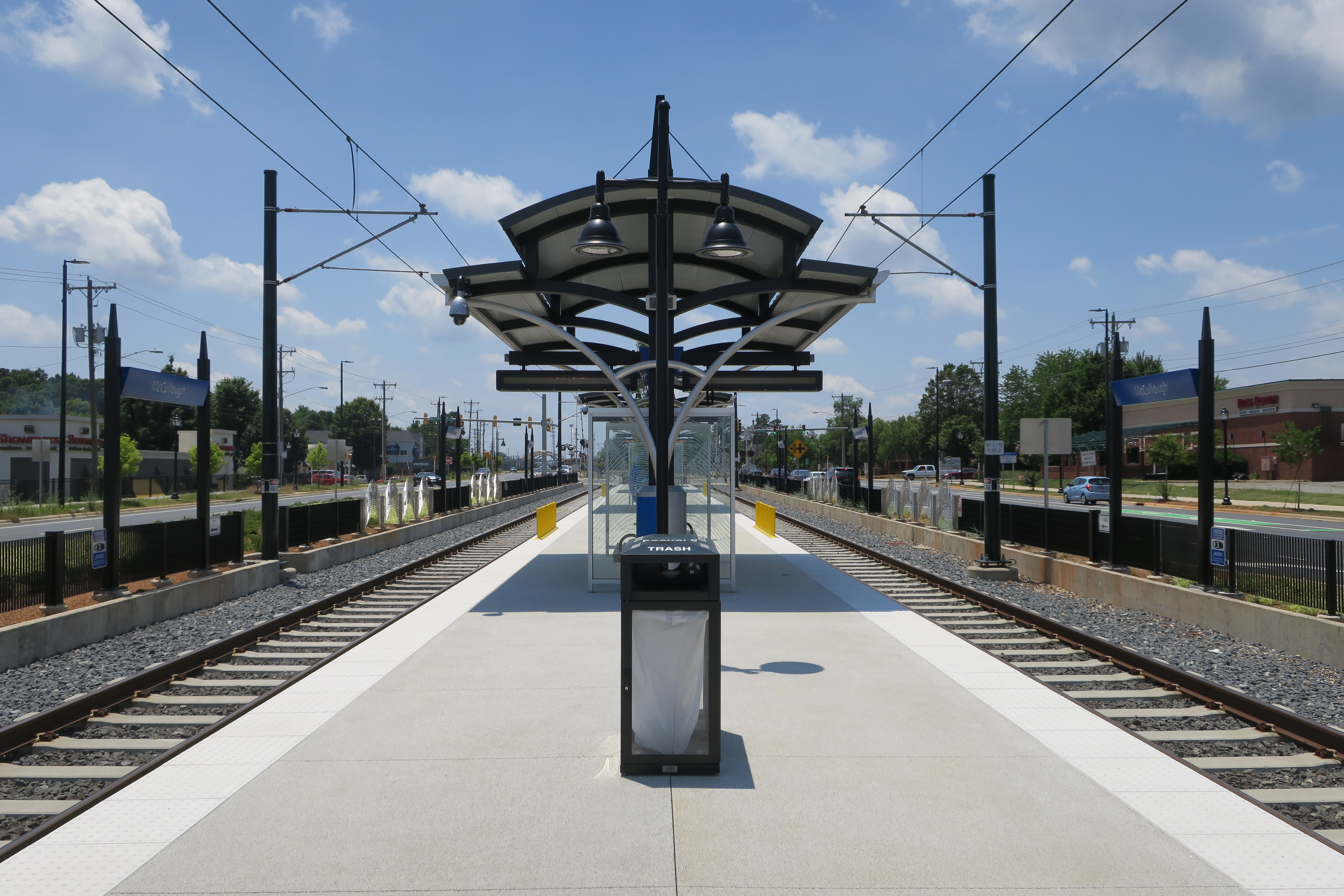
- The platform from the south end

General information
- Location: 8312 North Tryon Street; Charlotte, North Carolina; United States
- Coordinates: 35°18′2.69″N 80°45′11.72″W
- Owner: Charlotte Area Transit System
- Platforms: 1 island platform
- Tracks: 2

Construction
- Structure type: At-grade
- Cycle facilities: Bicycle racks
- Accessible: yes
- Architect: STV Inc.
- Architectural style: Postmodern

History
- Opened: March 16, 2018

Services
Preceding station	CATS	Following station
University City Boulevard toward I-485/South Boulevard	Lynx Blue Line	JW Clay Boulevard/UNC Charlotte toward UNC Charlotte–Main
Location

McCullough is a light rail station on the LYNX Blue Line in the University City neighborhood of Charlotte, North Carolina, United States. It opened on March 16, 2018, as part of the Blue Line extension to the UNC Charlotte campus and features a single island platform.
