= Archdale station =

Archdale
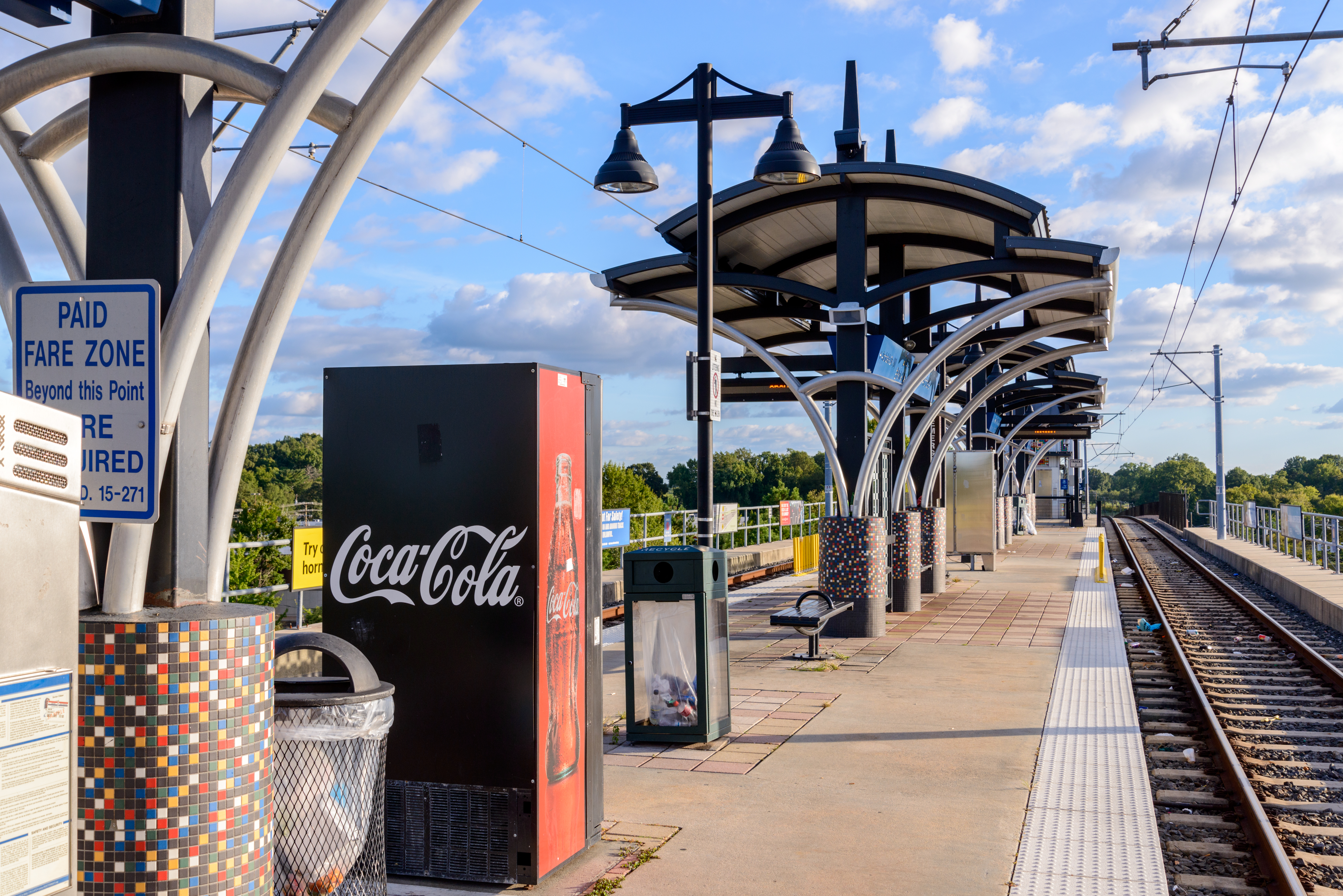

General information
- Location: 6230 South Boulevard; Charlotte, North Carolina; United States
- Coordinates: 35°9′10″N 80°52′39″W
- Owner: Charlotte Area Transit System
- Platforms: 1 island platform
- Tracks: 2
- Bus stands: 3
- Connections: CATS: 57

Construction
- Structure type: Elevated
- Parking: 432 spaces
- Cycle facilities: Bicycle racks
- Accessible: yes
- Architect: Ralph Whitehead Associates
- Architectural style: Postmodern

History
- Opened: November 24, 2007

Services
Preceding station	CATS	Following station
Arrowood toward I-485/South Boulevard	Lynx Blue Line	Tyvola toward UNC Charlotte–Main
Location

Archdale is a light rail station in Charlotte, North Carolina. The elevated island platform is a stop along the Lynx Blue Line and serves Montclaire South and nearby Montclaire and Starmount neighborhoods. It also features a 432-space park and ride and local bus connections.

== Location ==
The station is located at the intersection of Archdale Drive and Old Pineville Road. Surrounding it are three strip malls: Archdale Marketplace, Carriage Square, and Starmount Center; while to its west is the residential neighborhood of Montclaire South and nearby Archdale Park.

== History ==
The station was part of the overall planning and construction of the LYNX Blue Line; starting in 1999, it was approved in February 2000 and construction began on February 26, 2005. Between April 5 through May 5, 2006, the Archdale viaduct was installed. The station officially opened for service on Saturday, November 24, 2007, and as part of its opening celebration fares were not collected. Regular service with fare collection began on Monday, November 26, 2007.

== Station layout ==
The station is located on the Archdale viaduct, which does a fly-over of Archdale Drive. It consists of an island platform, four covered waiting areas, and both elevator and stairs that connect the platform level to street level; other amenities include ticket vending machines, emergency call box, and bicycle racks. The station also features several art installations, including a planter bench by Alice Adams, drinking fountain basins designed to look like dogwoods, the North Carolina state flower, by Nancy Blum, gingham motifs on both the pavers and shelters by Leticia Huerta, the painting of the bridge and retaining walls by Marek Ranis and the Tower of Light abstract display of acrylic reflectors on the elevator tower by Richard C. Elliott.

Beneath the station are three bus bays and a cement walkway that connects to the detached 464-space park and ride, surface parking lot, located along South Boulevard. Parking is free for patrons for either bus or light rail and is limited to 24 hours.
