= Sugar Creek station =

Sugar Creek
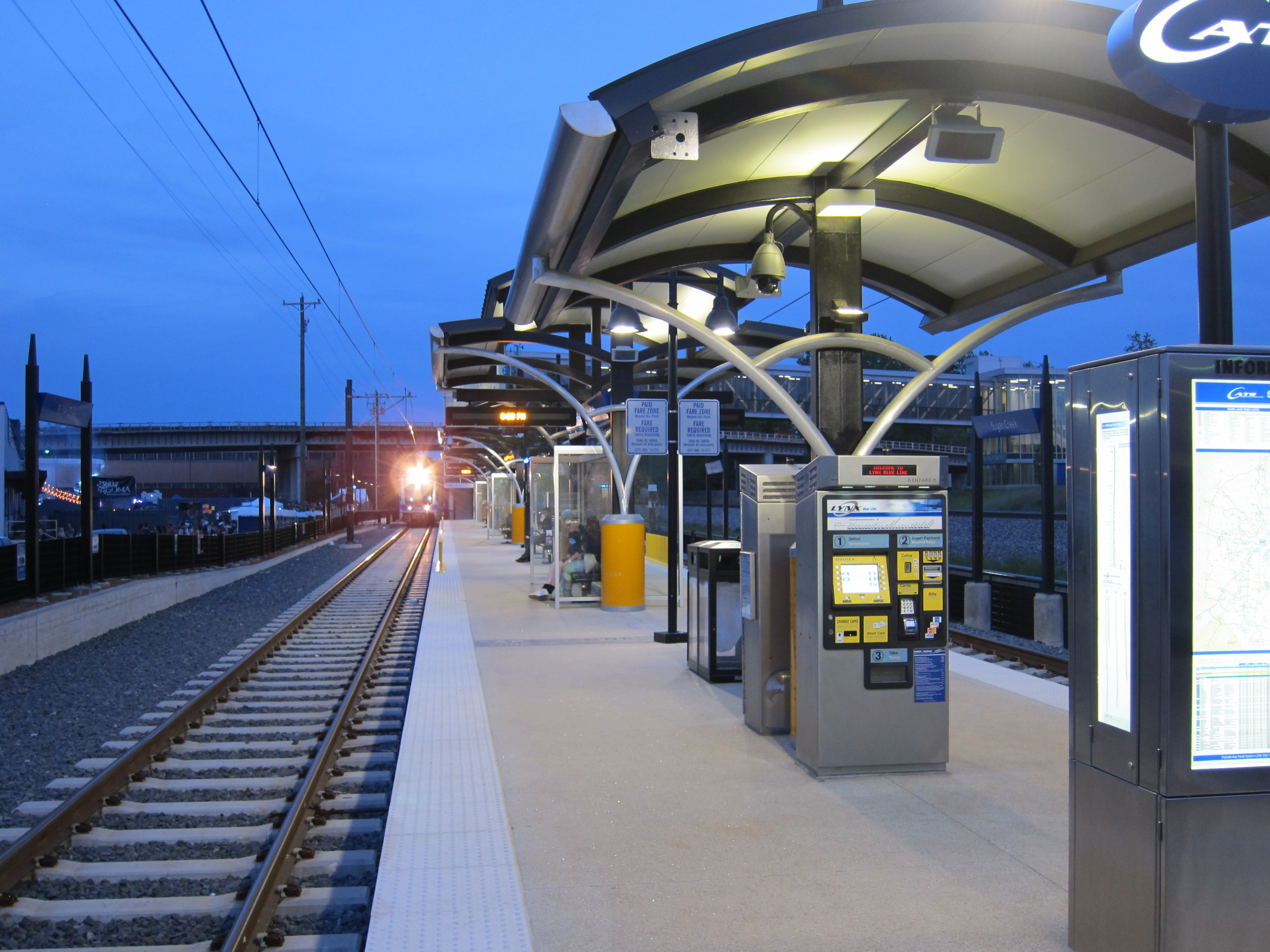

General information
- Location: 644 East Sugar Creek Road; Charlotte, North Carolina; United States
- Coordinates: 35°15′6.45″N 80°47′39.21″W
- Owner: Charlotte Area Transit System
- Platforms: 1 island platform
- Tracks: 2
- Bus stands: 3
- Connections: CATS: 4, 13, 211

Construction
- Structure type: At-grade
- Parking: 632 spaces
- Cycle facilities: Bicycle racks
- Accessible: yes
- Architect: STV Inc.
- Architectural style: Postmodern

History
- Opened: March 16, 2018

Services
Preceding station	CATS	Following station
36th Street toward I-485/South Boulevard	Lynx Blue Line	Old Concord Road toward UNC Charlotte–Main
Location

Sugar Creek is a light rail station on the LYNX Blue Line in the NoDa neighborhood of Charlotte, North Carolina, United States. It opened on March 16, 2018, as part of the Blue Line extension to the UNC Charlotte campus and features a single island platform.
