= Tyvola station =

Railway station in Charlotte, North Carolina, United States

Tyvola
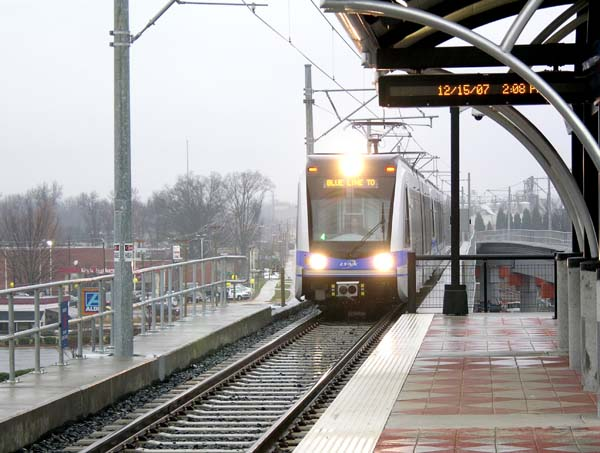
- Southbound train approaching the platform

General information
- Location: 5703 Old Pineville Road; Charlotte, North Carolina; United States
- Coordinates: 35°9′47″N 80°52′39″W
- Platforms: 1 island platform
- Tracks: 2
- Bus stands: 4
- Connections: CATS: 16, 60

Construction
- Structure type: Elevated
- Parking: 464 spaces
- Cycle facilities: Bicycle racks
- Accessible: yes
- Architect: Ralph Whitehead Associates
- Architectural style: Postmodern

History
- Opened: November 24, 2007

Services
Preceding station	CATS	Following station
Archdale toward I-485/South Boulevard	Lynx Blue Line	Woodlawn toward UNC Charlotte–Main
Location

Tyvola is a light rail station in Charlotte, North Carolina. The elevated island platform is a stop along the Lynx Blue Line and serves an area of mostly commercial and industrial businesses, with the neighborhoods of Madison Park and Montclaire located nearby. It also features a 464-space park and ride and local bus connections.

== Location ==
The station is located at the intersection of Old Pineville and Grover Roads, which is 1,050 feet (320 m) south from Tyvola Road. Various retail businesses surround the station, including Tyvola Mall on South Boulevard.

=== Artwork ===
Located at street level, beneath the station's platform, is the sculpture entitled Reconstructed Dwelling, by Dennis Oppenheim. Created in 2007, it features a stencil of a home floor plan, but with parts of the home stacked together and upside-down next to it. The sculpture is part of the CATS Art in Transit program.

== History ==
The station was part of the overall planning and construction of the LYNX Blue Line; starting in 1999, it was approved in February 2000 and construction began on February 26, 2005. Because Tyvola Road had the highest traffic count along the corridor, with an estimated 45 thousand vehicles a day, and an active Norfolk Southern rail crossing just south, an elevated station was selected for the location. Beginning on January 4, 2006, the installation of the concrete girders, ranging in size between 89 ft (27 m) to 119 ft (36 m), commenced for the construction of the elevated sections. All pieces were in place by February. The station officially opened for service on Saturday, November 24, 2007, and as part of its opening celebration fares were not collected. Regular service with fare collection began on Monday, November 26, 2007.

== Station layout ==
The station is located on the Tyvola viaduct, which spans a distance of three-eighths-mile (0.60 km), flying over Tyvola Road, Grover Road, and Norfolk Southern rail. It consists of an island platform, two covered waiting areas, and both elevator and stairs that connect the platform level to street level; other amenities include ticket vending machines, emergency call box, and bicycle racks. The station also features several art installations including a drinking fountain basin designed to look like dogwood, the North Carolina state flower, by Nancy Blum. Bas-reliefs entitled Hornbeam, by Alice Adams. Plaid motifs on both the pavers and shelters, by Leticia Huerta; and the painting of the viaduct and retaining walls, by Marek Ranis.

Two surface parking lots make-up the 464-space park and ride. The first is located directly beneath the station and includes four bus bays, with entrance/exits on both Old Pineville and Grover Roads. The second is adjacent to the station, with entrance/exits on both South Boulevard and Grover Road. Parking is free for patrons for either bus or light rail and is limited to 24 hours.
