= 36th Street station (Charlotte) =

Light rail station in Charlotte, North Carolina

36th Street
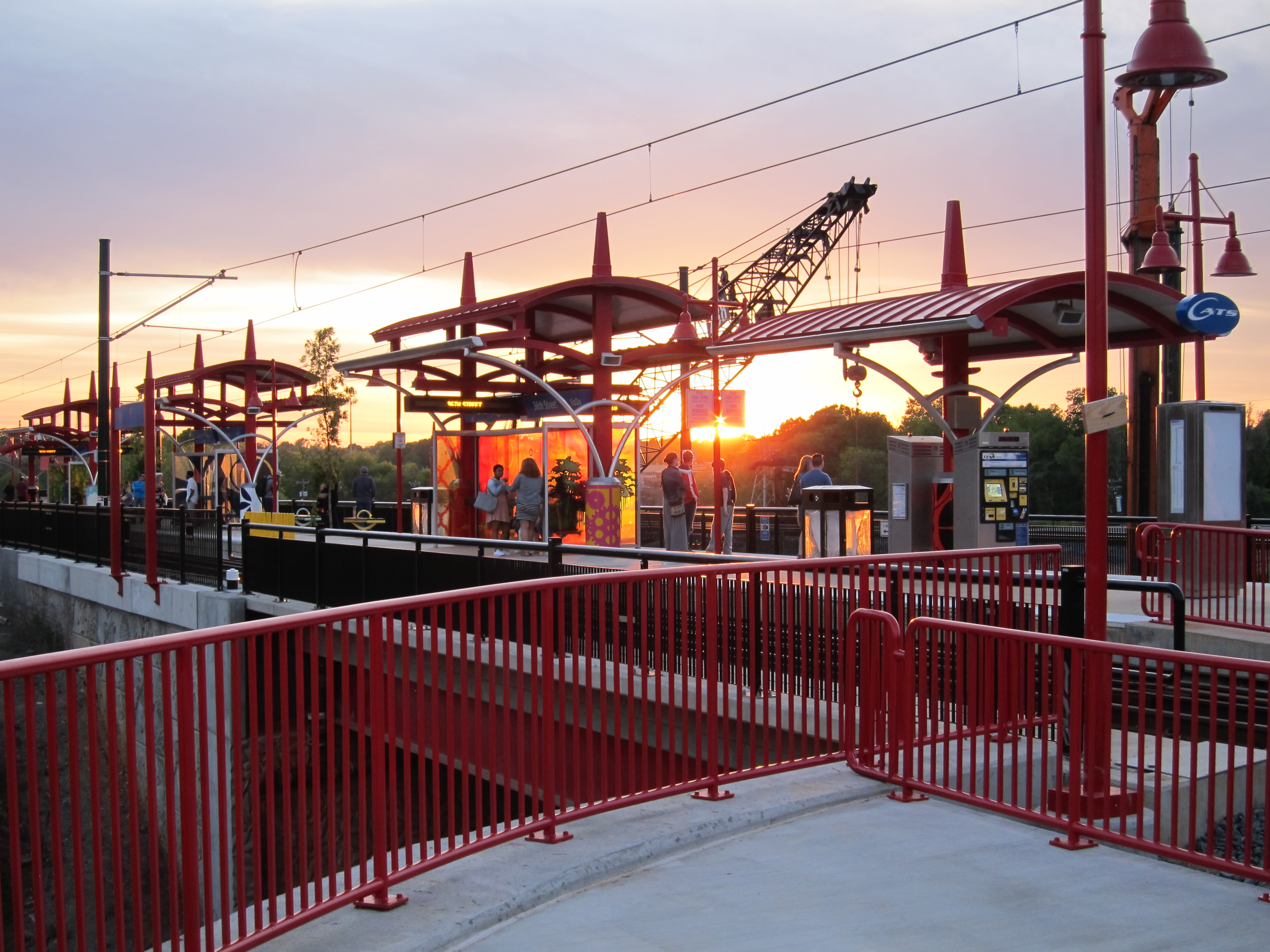
- 36th Street station at sunset

General information
- Location: 434 East 36th Street; Charlotte, North Carolina; United States
- Coordinates: 35°14′54.56″N 80°48′27.32″W
- Owner: Charlotte Area Transit System
- Platforms: 1 island platform
- Tracks: 2
- Connections: CATS: 3, 23

Construction
- Structure type: At-grade
- Cycle facilities: Bicycle racks
- Accessible: yes
- Architect: STV Inc.
- Architectural style: Postmodern

History
- Opened: March 16, 2018

Services
Preceding station	CATS	Following station
25th Street toward I-485/South Boulevard	Lynx Blue Line	Sugar Creek toward UNC Charlotte–Main
Location

36th Street is a light rail station on the LYNX Blue Line in the NoDa neighborhood of Charlotte, North Carolina, United States. It opened on March 16, 2018, as part of the Blue Line extension to the UNC Charlotte campus and features a single island platform.
