= Tom Hunter station =

Tram stop in Charlotte, North Carolina, United States

Tom Hunter
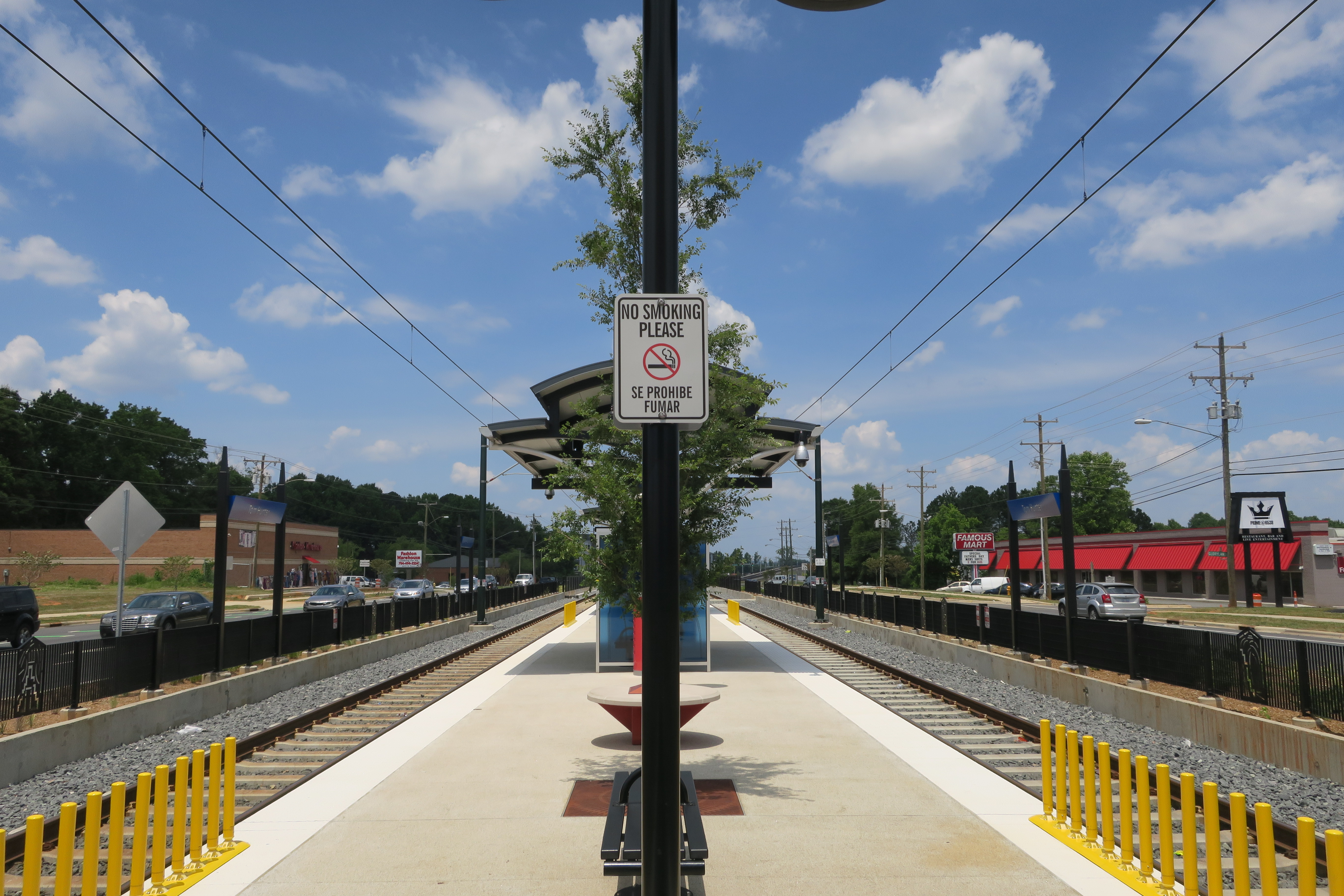
- The platform from the south end

General information
- Location: 6505 North Tryon Street; Charlotte, North Carolina; United States
- Coordinates: 35°16′38.15″N 80°46′3.44″W
- Owner: Charlotte Area Transit System
- Platforms: 1 island platform
- Tracks: 2
- Connections: CATS: 11, 211

Construction
- Structure type: At-grade
- Cycle facilities: Bicycle racks
- Accessible: yes
- Architect: STV Inc.
- Architectural style: Postmodern

History
- Opened: March 16, 2018

Services
Preceding station	CATS	Following station
Old Concord Road toward I-485/South Boulevard	Lynx Blue Line	University City Boulevard toward UNC Charlotte–Main
Location

Tom Hunter is a light rail station on the LYNX Blue Line in the Hidden Valley neighborhood of Charlotte, North Carolina, United States. It opened on March 16, 2018, as part of the Blue Line extension to the UNC Charlotte campus and features a single island platform.
