= University City station =

University City station may refer to:

- University City–Big Bend station, a St. Louis MetroLink subway station in Greater St. Louis, Missouri
- University City Boulevard station, a light rail station in Charlotte, North Carolina
- Penn Medicine Station (formerly University City station), a train station in the University City section of Philadelphia, Pennsylvania

== See also ==
- University station (disambiguation)
