= JW Clay Boulevard/UNC Charlotte station =

Public transit light rail station in North Carolina, United States

JW Clay / UNC Charlotte
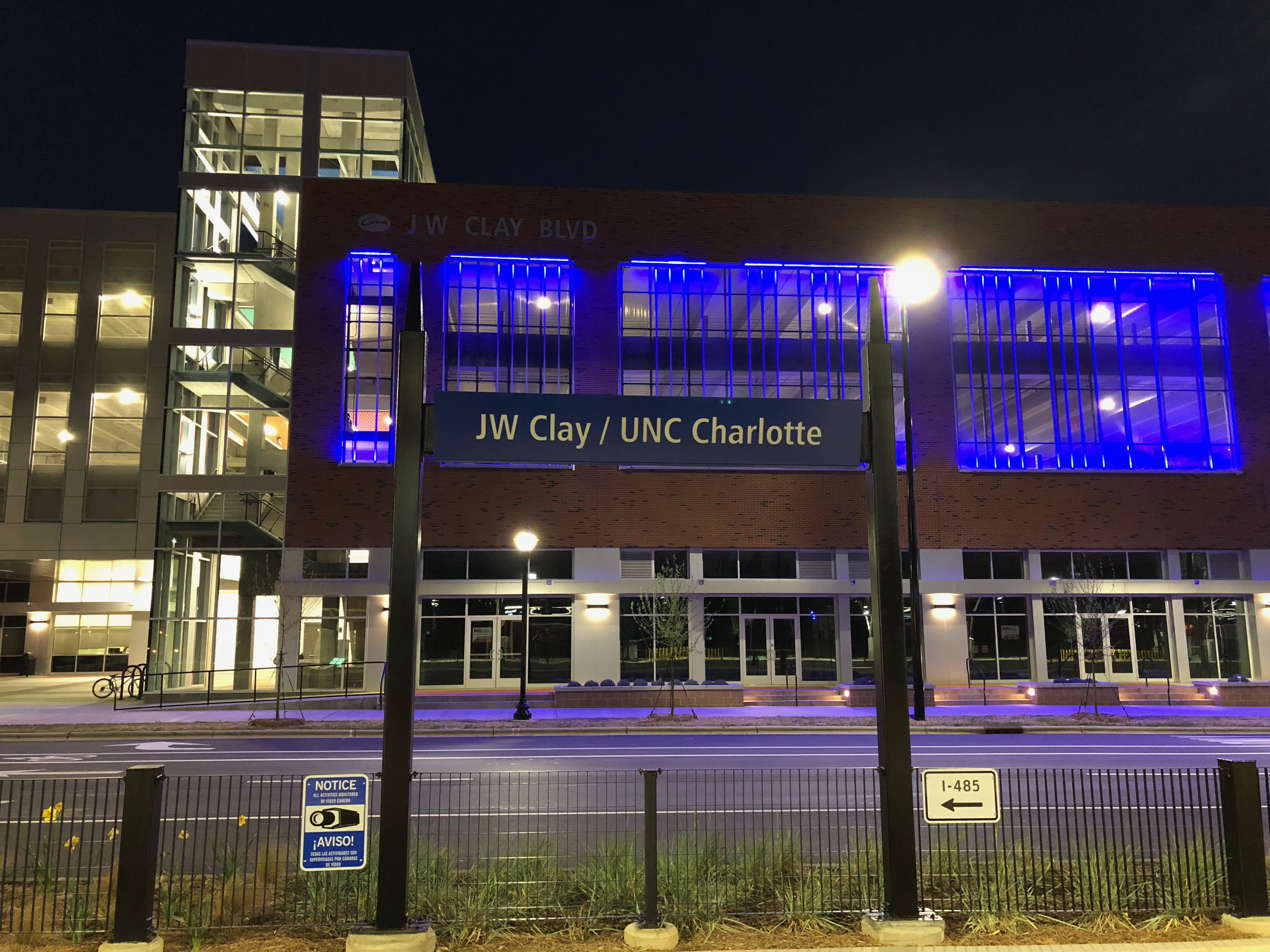
- Platform and parking garage at night

General information
- Location: 9048 North Tryon Street; Charlotte, North Carolina; United States
- Coordinates: 35°18′38″N 80°44′43″W
- Owner: Charlotte Area Transit System
- Platforms: 1 island platform
- Tracks: 2
- Bus stands: 3
- Connections: CATS: 22, 29, 47, 59; Rider: CCX

Construction
- Parking: 800 spaces
- Cycle facilities: Bicycle racks
- Accessible: yes
- Architect: STV Inc.
- Architectural style: Postmodern

History
- Opened: March 16, 2018

Services
Preceding station	CATS	Following station
McCullough toward I-485/South Boulevard	Lynx Blue Line	UNC Charlotte–Main Terminus
Location

JW Clay Boulevard/UNC Charlotte is a light rail station on the LYNX Blue Line in Charlotte, North Carolina, United States. It is located on North Tryon Street at JW Clay Boulevard in University City. The station consists of a single island platform in the street's median, connected via pedestrian overpass to both sides of North Tryon Street and to an adjacent parking garage. The parking garage charges a flat weekday fee for all riders that do not have a one-day, weekly or monthly pass. JW Clay Blvd/UNC Charlotte station is west of the University of North Carolina at Charlotte campus and is near Jerry Richardson Stadium. The station opened on March 16, 2018.

== History ==
Construction on the station began in late 2014 and the foundation was completed by the end of 2015. The pedestrian overpass was installed in two phases, from spring 2016 to August 2016, and the university plans to build a new pathway via the bridge's east approach. The Blue Line extension opened on March 16, 2018. On March 19, the Concord Kannapolis Area Transit (Rider) established a new express route, called the Concord Charlotte Express (CCX), between the station and the Rider Transit Center in Concord.

== Development ==
A 226-room hotel and conference center is planned to be built by the UNC Charlotte Foundation near the station. The project is scheduled to begin construction in 2019 and be completed the following year.
