= Starmount (Charlotte neighborhood) =

- Neighborhood
- Interactive map of Starmount
- Coordinates: 35.137667°N 80.874646°W
- Country: United States
- State: North Carolina
- County: Mecklenburg County
- City: Charlotte
- Council District: 6
- Annexed: 1965–1974

Government
  - City Council: Tariq Bokhari
- Time zone: UTC-5 (EST)
  - Summer (DST): UTC-4 (EDT)
- Zip Code: 28210
- Area codes: 704, 980

Starmount is a predominantly residential neighborhood in Charlotte, North Carolina. Located along South Boulevard, it is between Sharon Road West and Emerywood Drive, with the Little Sugar Creek its eastern border. Consisting of nearly 1,400 homes, it is one of the largest established neighborhoods and is known for its ranch-style or split-level brick bungalow homes.

== History ==
Prior to the neighborhood's development, at least as far back as (1929), most of the area was farmland. South Blvd. and Old Pineville Rd. were already there, as was the Railroad tracks running parallel to them. Starmount was constructed during the early 1960s by Ervin Construction Company. Phase One of construction took place primarily from Starbrook Drive south to Sherbourne, then spread north towards Archdale Drive at Phase Two. Homes were built using true pine 2 x 4s, hardwood floors and brick construction. A great portion of the neighborhood is made up of 1,200 to 1,500 square feet (110 to 140 m^{2}). ranch-style, but there are also many split-level, two-story, and basement homes of 2,400 sq ft (220 m^{2}) and larger.

== Subdivisions ==
Starmount has three other residential subdivisions within its area, they are: Lennox Square, Park South Station, and Starmount Cove. Several large apartment complexes can also be found at Sharon Lakes Road.

== Transportation infrastructure ==
=== Mass transit ===
The Lynx Blue Line, operated by the Charlotte Area Transit System (CATS), has three stations with parking that are all located along South Boulevard:

- Sharon Road West station
- Arrowood station
- Archdale station

CATS also operates the following bus routes, all of which borders the neighborhood:

- #12 (South Boulevard)
- #43 (Ballantyne)
- #57 (Archdale/SouthPark)
