= University City Boulevard station =

University City Blvd
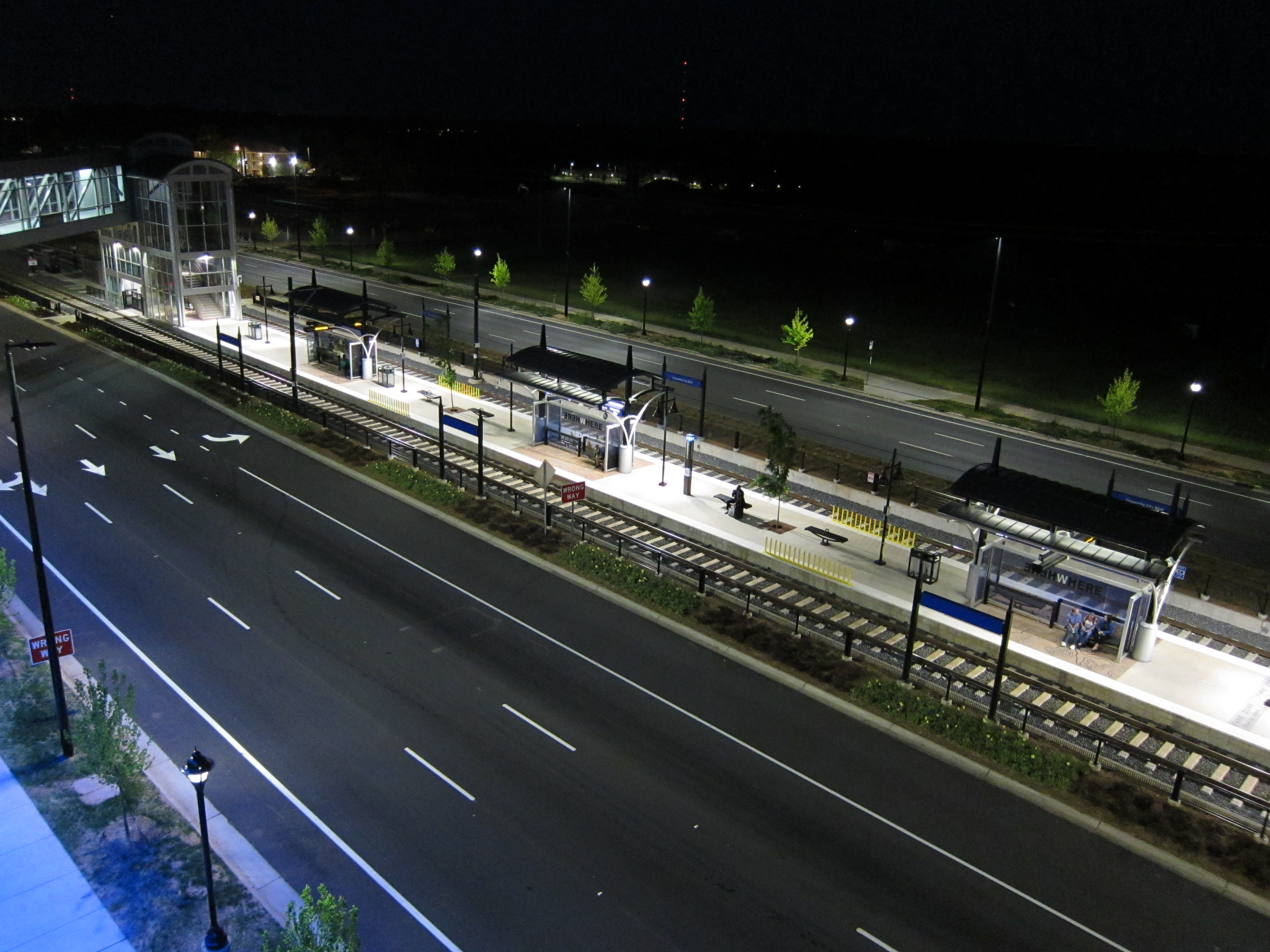

General information
- Location: 7205 North Tryon Street; Charlotte, North Carolina; United States
- Coordinates: 35°17′12.42″N 80°45′40.54″W
- Owner: Charlotte Area Transit System
- Platforms: 1 island platform
- Tracks: 2
- Bus stands: 3
- Connections: CATS: 11, 50, 54

Construction
- Structure type: At-grade
- Parking: 1,513 spaces
- Cycle facilities: Bicycle racks
- Accessible: yes
- Architect: STV Inc.
- Architectural style: Postmodern

History
- Opened: March 16, 2018

Services
Preceding station	CATS	Following station
Tom Hunter toward I-485/South Boulevard	Lynx Blue Line	McCullough toward UNC Charlotte–Main
Location

University City Boulevard is a light rail station on the LYNX Blue Line in Charlotte, North Carolina, United States. It is located on North Tryon Street and Periwinkle Hill Avenue in University City. The station consists of a single island platform in the street's median, connected to an adjacent parking garage by a pedestrian overpass. The parking garage charges a flat weekday fee for all riders that do not have a one-day, weekly or monthly pass. Notable places nearby include the Belgate Shopping Center, IKEA and the Wells Fargo Customer Information Center (CIC). The station opened on March 16, 2018.
