= Leticia Huerta =

Visual artist

Leticia Huerta (born 1954) is a Chicana artist known for her public art and paintings that reshape community spaces.

== Early life and education ==
Leticia Huerta was born in Texas. Huerta earned a B.F.A. in painting from the University of Texas at San Antonio, followed by an M.F.A. in painting at Southern Methodist University in Dallas.

Initially, she studied biology to prepare for medical school and earned a BA in Biology from St. Mary's University in Texas. Nature and the environment became her passions when it came to creating art stemming from her early studies in Biology.

In the years following her graduation from graduate school, Huerta focused on painting before moving on to multimedia. She has emphasized nature's beauty and how we should protect the planet throughout her career, emphasizing on the emergence of climate change. Throughout her art and biology career, Huerta has been driven to keep the environment healthy and stable.

== Work ==
As an artist, Huerta is passionate about the environment and displays this devotion in her studio work, and public art work at bridges, river walks, transit systems, streetscapes, and park projects. Huerta works with acrylics, oil collages, concrete, tile, limestone, photography, and steel and other materials. Though Huerta has explored other forms of art, she always seems to return to the environment because that is where her interest lies, and what is honest about her art. In addition to working on a number of public art projects, Huerta has worked with design teams and fabricators on a variety of artworks. Transit stations, streetscape, bridges, and park projects are among her public art works completed.

A color screenprint, Padre Nuestro, was created by her in 1995–96. Published in The Serie Print Project, it measures 18 x 16'. Symbolizing healing and love, she addresses her father in a religious sense.

At the entrance to Mud Creek Trail at McAllister Park in San Antonio, Texas, Bloom created in 2020 is on display. The piece was commissioned by Public Art San Antonio. Her project represents the many hiking and biking trails in San Antonio as well as the flowers that grow along the trails. To celebrate the beauty of flowers, the project creates metal sculptures out of bicycle parts inspired by native wildflowers. Bloom's flowers will flourish along the city's greenways. Due to the popularity of Bloom, Mud Creek Trail San Antonio decided to install Bloom at other locations. There are seven installations in this series. San Antonio's River Walk Public Art Garden was the next location. Among the locations where Bloom is installed are Apache Creek at Brazos Pocket Park, Salado Creek at Eisenhower Park, Salado Creek at Southside Lions Park, Alazan Creek at Farias Park, and Leon Creek at Tezel Road Facility. With silver rings on the flower stems, Blooms serves as trailhead connectors, wayfinding markers, and a scientific purpose when San Antonio receives rain, revealing different levels of water.

In 2010, the Charlotte Area Transit System Light Rail System was installed in Charlotte, NC. In Spanish and English, the project draws inspiration from Mexican bingo cards with symbols from the region, such as Charlotte's crown and state bird.

The Isaac Streetscape was created in 2009 at the Office of Arts and Culture in Phoenix, Arizona. She contributed to the improvement of the sidewalks and bus shelters with this project, since the addition of trees and plantings enhances safety and comfort. Plants and flowers from the local area are featured in ceramic mosaic tile on the bus shelters. Images of agave plants and stars from the night sky are perforated into the shade screens. Students will be welcomed into Isaac Middle School by a steel gate that echoes the theme of desert plants, as well as a river image on the walkway.

== Collections ==
Huerta's work is in the permanent collections of the Museum of Fine Arts, Boston; the Mexic-Arte Museum, Austin; the San Antonio Museum of Art; the Meadows Museum, Dallas; the McNay Art Museum

== See also ==
- List of Lynx public art artists
