= Lynx Blue Line =

Light rail line in Charlotte, NC

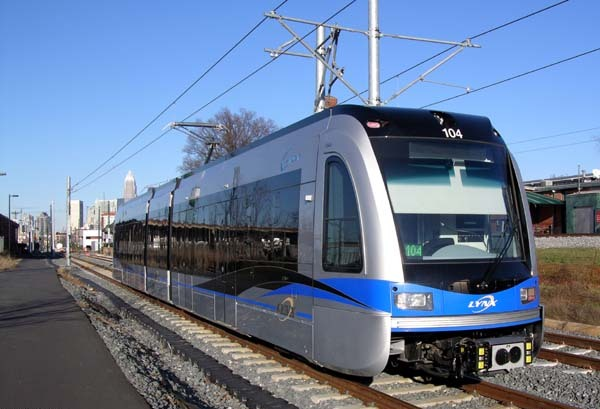

Overview
- Status: Operational
- Owner: Charlotte Area Transit System
- Locale: Charlotte, North Carolina
- Termini: I-485/South Boulevard (south); UNC Charlotte–Main (north)
- Stations: 26

Service
- Type: Light rail
- System: Charlotte Area Transit System
- Operator: Charlotte Area Transit System
- Depot(s): South Boulevard Facility; North Brevard Facility
- Rolling stock: Siemens S70
- Daily ridership: 17,057 (December 2024)

History
- Work began: February 26, 2005; 21 years ago
- Opened: November 24, 2007; 18 years ago
- Extension: March 16, 2018; 8 years ago

Technical
- Line length: 19.3 mi (31.1 km)
- Number of tracks: 2
- Character: Grade-separated
- Track gauge: 4 ft 8 1/2 in (1,435 mm) standard gauge
- Electrification: Overhead line, 750 V DC
- Operating speed: 55 mph (89 km/h)
- Highest elevation: 801 ft (244 m)
Route map
Lynx Blue Line highlighted in blue

The Lynx Blue Line is a light rail line in Charlotte, North Carolina, United States. Opened in 2007, it was the first rail line of the Charlotte Area Transit System, and the first major rapid rail service of any kind in the state. The 26-station, 19.3-mile (31.1 km) line extends from its northern terminus at the University of North Carolina at Charlotte in University City through NoDa, Uptown, and South End, then runs along South Boulevard to its southern terminus just north of Interstate 485 at the Pineville city limits. The line averages over 27,700 passenger trips every day and offers connections to the CATS CityLynx Gold Line which opened in 2015.

The first phase of the line opened on November 24, 2007 between I-485/South Boulevard and 7th Street. It began operating nearly seventy years after the previous Charlotte streetcar system was dismantled in 1938 in favor of motorized bus transit. An extension from 7th Street, following a northeast path along the existing Norfolk Southern right-of-way along both North Davidson Street and North Tryon Street, to University City and the University of North Carolina at Charlotte (UNCC) opened on March 16, 2018.

== History ==
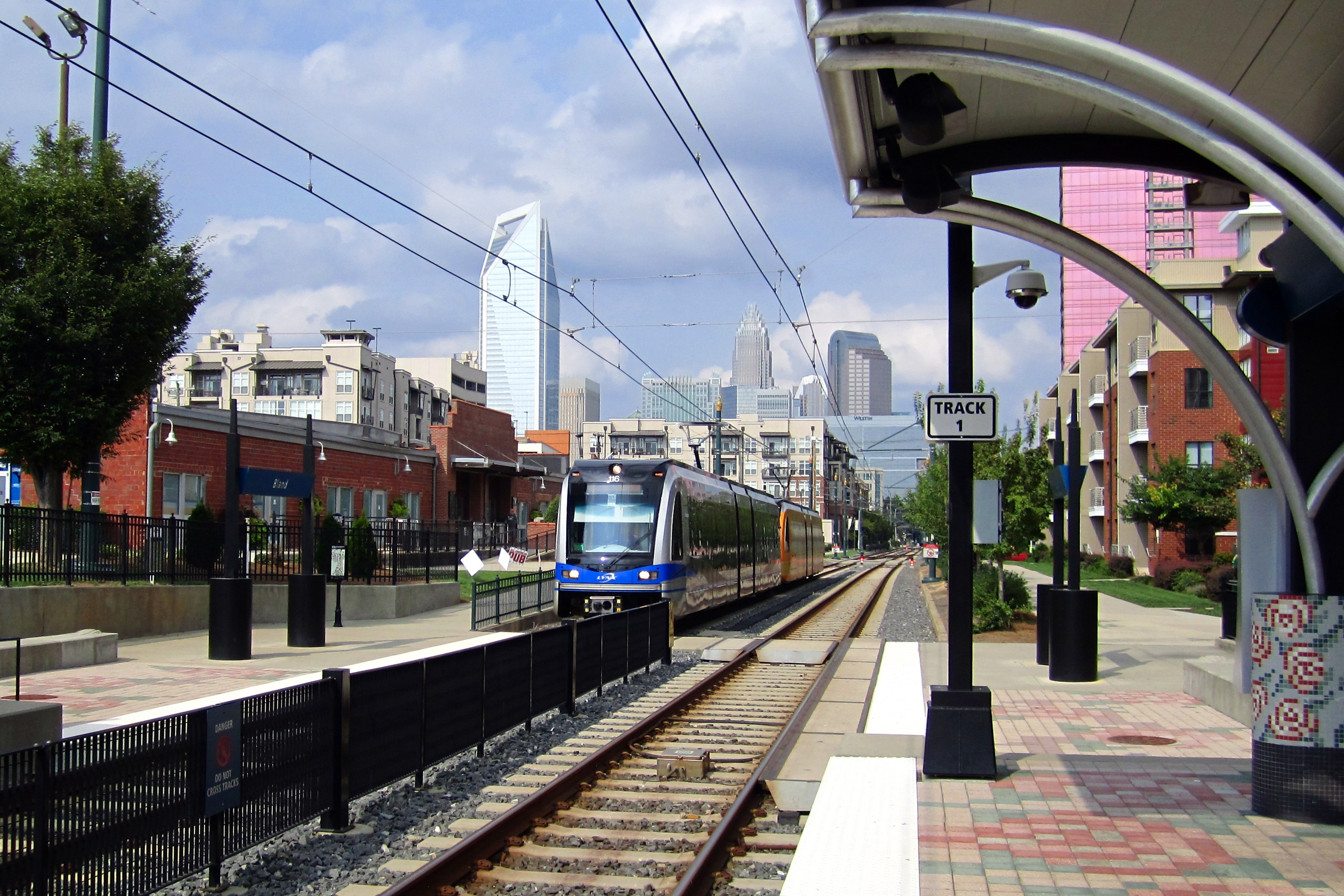
Lynx train near Bland Street station

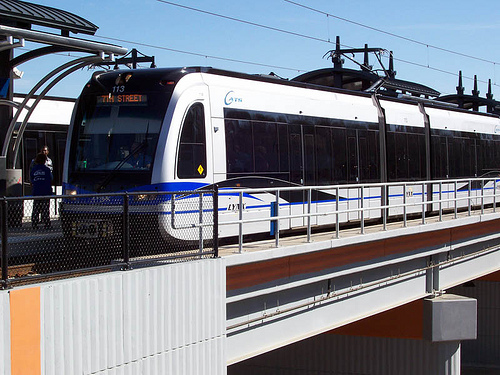
Lynx Siemens S70 car at I-485/South Boulevard station

By the mid-1980s, city and county planners were evaluating strategies to both control and focus the region's growing population and expanding development. One strategy considered was the construction of a light rail line to encourage new businesses and housing along its corridor. In 1984, the Charlotte-Mecklenburg Planning Commission made its first recommendation for a light rail line connecting Uptown Charlotte with the UNCC as part of the community's 2005 Vision Plan. In response, mayor Harvey Gantt sought $50,000 from the city council for a feasibility study, only to drop the request due to a lack of council support.

After remaining dormant for nearly three years, the light rail debate once again emerged as a light rail/mass transit task force was established by new mayor Sue Myrick in early 1988. The task force received $185,000 from a combination of local, state and federal sources to conduct an initial study of a system envisioned as three lines radiating from Uptown Charlotte. One line would run to the UNCC in the northeast; a second was to go to Pineville, with future expansion envisioned to both Fort Mill and Rock Hill to the south, and a third was to connect to Matthews, with future expansion anticipated to Monroe to the southeast.

By September 1988, the result of the initial Barton-Aschman Associates study was a 77-mile (123.9 km) system encompassing a loop around Uptown Charlotte and eight separate corridors radiating from the city center, at a total cost of $467 million. The corridors envisioned included a route along Albemarle Road to the east, connecting to SouthPark and Matthews to the southeast, Pineville to the south, the Charlotte/Douglas International Airport to the west, UNCC to the northeast, along Brookshire Boulevard to the northwest, and Davidson to the north. The cost of the plan was significantly more than the $101 million in bonds issued by the city council which was to be used to start the project. The cost factor, combined with the inability to obtain the necessary right-of-way for the lines, led to the project's deferral.

In March 1990, CATS allotted just $14 million for light rail development for the next decade. Once again, construction costs were cited in postponing the project. Additionally, at the time the proposal did not anticipate sufficient ridership to allow it to qualify for Federal Transit Administration (FTA) grants. Instead, the $14 million would be used to purchase abandoned rights-of-way for future light rail development as they became available, and to study a proposed line connecting the Wilgrove area in east Mecklenburg County with Tyvola Road south of Uptown Charlotte. In 1998, after nearly fifteen years of debate, Mecklenburg County voters approved a one-half cent sales tax toward implementing the 2025 Integrated Transit/Land-Use Plan, which included construction of a light rail network. Once the tax was approved, Charlotte was able to receive matching funds from FTA grants for financing construction, and planning for the South Corridor to Pineville commenced.

=== Planning and construction ===
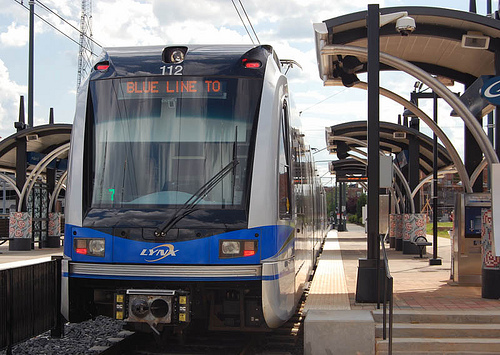
Car 112 at Carson station

Although light rail had been envisioned to connect Charlotte and Rock Hill in previous years, official planning for the corridor – later to become the Blue Line – did not commence until 1999. The line was initially to have been a 13.5-mile (21.73 km) route serving as a connection between Uptown Charlotte and Pineville along the Norfolk Southern rail line paralleling South Boulevard, at a cost of $225 million. In February 2000, the Metropolitan Transit Commission unanimously approved the corridor and by April $8.2 million was allocated for the initial purchase of construction materials. In September Parsons Transportation Group was hired by CATS to complete engineering and environmental studies for the corridor. Cost estimates for the completed line had by then increased to $331 million.

By July 2002 the overall cost for completing the line had escalated to $371 million as a result of increasing land and construction prices. By March 2004, estimates had increased to $398.7 million, and were further revised upward to $427 million in January 2005. The new estimates were again attributed to rising land and construction costs. These further delayed the official groundbreaking for the line, which was held on February 26, 2005.

Due to higher levels of traffic anticipated at a number of the stations along the route, CATS determined that bridges spanning the busiest road crossings would be necessary to prevent further congestion. Installation of concrete girders ranging in size between 89 and 119 feet (27 and 36 m) began at Tyvola station on January 4, 2006, and was completed by February. Along with the Tyvola viaduct, similar installation work took place at Archdale station from April 5 through May 5; at the Woodlawn station from May 10 through May 30; and at Arrowood station from July 13 through July 23. In February 2006, after a year of construction, CATS unveiled "Lynx" as the official name of the light rail network. Lynx was selected from a list of over 250 possibilities, including City Lynx and Xcel, and was chosen in congruence with the big cat theme used by local professional sports teams (the Carolina Panthers and the then-Charlotte Bobcats). It was also homophonous with "links", suggesting connectivity. By September 2006, estimated completion costs for the Blue Line had increased again, attributed to faulty planning and design by Parsons Transportation Group. By early 2007 revised estimates for completion were $462.7 million, more than double the original amount of $227 million.

=== Commencement of service ===
Nearly three years after the start of construction, the Lynx Blue Line opened to passengers on November 24, 2007. On the opening weekend of November 24–25, all trips were free, resulting in 24,000 rider trips during the first four hours and 60,000 trips on the first day, well above maximum rated capacity. Revenue service commenced on Monday November 26. The first major rapid rail service of any kind in North Carolina, the opening of the Blue Line marked a revival of rail transit within the city since the original streetcar network was abandoned in 1938 in favor of motor buses.

=== University City extension ===
Originally called the Northeast Corridor, the Blue Line Extension connects end-on with the existing line at the 7th Street station in Uptown Charlotte. The extension serves University City and the University of North Carolina at Charlotte (UNCC), following a northeast path along an existing railway right-of-way along both North Davidson Street and North Tryon Street. It is 9.7 miles (15.6 km) long with 11 stations, and cost $1.159 billion ($580 million federal funding plus $299 million state and $280 million local matches). The extension opened seven months late on March 16, 2018, in time for the 2018 NCAA Division I men's basketball tournament.

==== Planning (1985–2011) ====
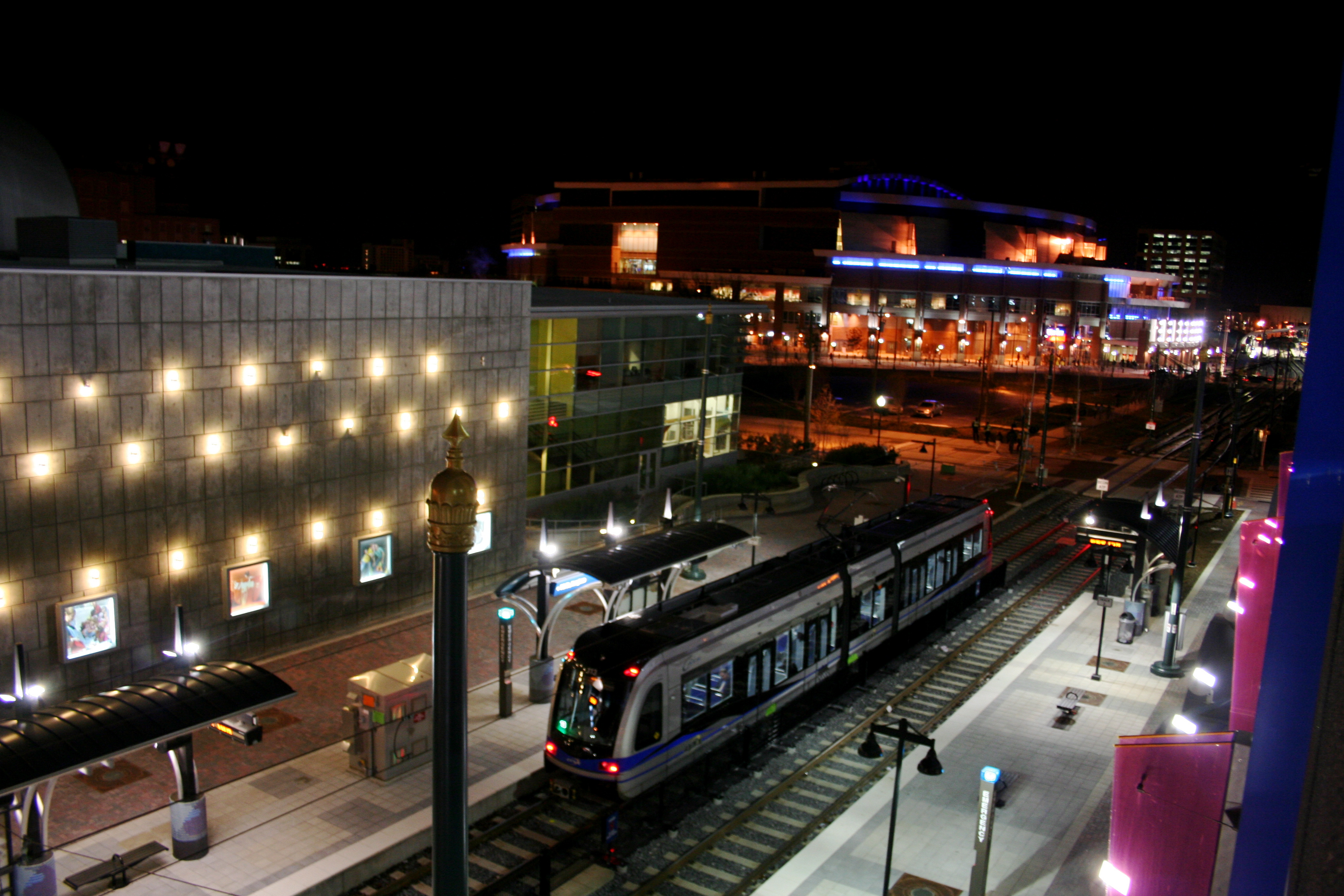
Lynx car at the 7th Street Station

The possibility of developing a light rail line between UNCC and Uptown via Newell was initially evaluated in 1985. The route was proposed for the then Southern Railway tracks, running parallel to both North Tryon Street and Old Concord Road, and was slated for completion at some point between 1995 and 2000. After years of discussion and delays, the proposed route was chosen in June 2006.

The selected route followed the existing Norfolk Southern right-of-way from Uptown to approximately Sugar Creek Road where it paralleled North Tryon Street to its terminus on the southern side of Interstate 485. Along the Norfolk Southern R-line ROW, the light rail tracks paralleled existing freight lines, and also included a station on the UNCC campus. The decision to end the line at I-485, short of Salome Church Road, was based on an estimated $30 million bridge and a projected daily passenger count of only 200 riders. Estimates for the line ranged from $928 million to $1.12 billion. This included more grade separations than previous estimates, and 300-foot (91 m) platforms to accommodate longer trains.

By November 2007, the Federal Transit Administration had approved preliminary engineering work on the corridor, and in January 2008 the Charlotte City Council approved funding, with work to commence by March 2008. The $30 million engineering study was expected to be complete by 2010, at which time the FTA would determine if federal funding was available for half of the project's construction. In July 2010, CATS announced that funding was being sought to extend the existing line to 9th Street to serve the UNCC Uptown Campus.

==== Design (2011–2013) ====
On December 12, 2011, the FTA issued a record of decision for the line, confirming that the preliminary design passed the requirements of the National Environmental Policy Act, and allowing final design work to begin. On the same day, an $18 million federal grant for the project was also approved.

On April 19, 2012, the North Carolina Department of Transportation (NCDOT) committed to paying 25 percent ($290 million) of the extension's estimated $1.16 billion final cost, with construction set to begin in 2013. On May 16, the North Carolina Railroad Company, CATS and Norfolk Southern signed lease, construction and operating agreements for the Lynx Blue Line Extension along the North Carolina Railroad Corridor.

In July, the FTA gave its approval for CATS to enter the Final Design stage for the Blue Line Extension, which allowed the project to move from the 65 to 100 percent design level, preparation of final construction plans, right-of-way acquisition, construction cost estimates, bid documents and utility relocation. CATS could then enter into a full funding grant agreement (FFGA) with the FTA, at which stage the FTA would commit to provide 50 percent funding. On October 16, CATS signed the FFGA with the FTA. Of the projected $1.16 billion cost, the FTA was responsible for $580 million; the NCDOT would spend $299 million, and CATS $281 million. Some property owners along the proposed route later expressed concerns over inadequate compensation for their properties.

==== Construction (2013–2018) ====
On July 18, 2013, the official groundbreaking took place near the 9th Street station. Attending the ceremony were Charlotte mayor Patsy Kinsey, UNCC chancellor Philip Dubois, FTA administrator Peter Rogoff and N.C. Governor Pat McCrory, the former mayor of Charlotte and an initial supporter of the Lynx project. By the end of the year work began to shift underground utilities, building retaining walls and initial grading and drainage work.

By January 2014, final design work for the extension was over 95 percent complete, costing nearly $80 million of a total budget of $187 million; the city had also purchased 261 of the 312 properties needed for $69.7 million from a total budget of $121.4 million. The remaining 51 properties were to be acquired by the end of January. Engineering challenges include depressing 36th Street in NoDa (North Davidson) and elevating the railway line in that area to make the intersection safer. The city decided to divide the extension into three segments, split between different contractors. On January 27, the city awarded a civil construction contract to a joint venture of Balfour Beatty Infrastructure and Blythe Development Co., who would be paid $108 million for the first segment, from Uptown Charlotte to Old Concord Road. The joint venture was formed to improve drainage, build bridges, maintain retaining walls, control traffic, and move water and sewer mains. CATS chief executive Carolyn Flowers said the amount was $9 million less than the city had budgeted.

A separate contract was let for the section from Old Concord Road to UNCC; the $119 million contract was awarded to Lane Construction on April 14. In the same month A separate contract for $130.8 million was awarded to Balfour Beatty to lay rails and install power stations and overhead catenary. The contracts had a total budget of $558 million. Because bids were lower than anticipated, CATS restored some previously eliminated items, including additional ticket vending machines, a parking deck at Sugar Creek station, and a fifth level on the J.W. Clay Boulevard station parking deck. CATS also intended to request additional enhancements, including expansion of the North Yard maintenance facility and construction of a pedestrian bridge at Sugar Creek station. In addition, since the original Blue Line had only been designed for two-car trains, CATS intended to extend some station platforms since the extension would use three-car trains.

By late 2014, only 20 percent of the $228 million contingency fund had been used. CATS reported encountering difficulties with relocating underground utilities, but said the project remained on schedule. In the uptown area, initial grading had begun, as well as removal of overhead electrical wires originally installed for the Charlotte Trolley in the 1990s. Along the second phase (from uptown to Old Concord Road) the city had started building retaining walls and laying the foundation for the Old Concord Road station. Several temporary street closures were required, including 16th Street (to February 2015) and 36th Street in NoDa (until 2017). CATS also worked with NCDOT to replace the West Mallard Creek Church Road bridge over North Tryon Street.

On June 8, 2015, the Charlotte city council approved a change order to increase three contracts by $19.5 million and keep the project on schedule; however, city council reported still having $170 million in the contingency fund. In September 2015, the United States Department of Transportation (USDOT) announced that it had issued a $180 million loan via the Transportation Infrastructure Finance and Innovation Act for Blue Line construction. According to a December 2015 CATS construction report, most track had been laid and the foundations for the J.W. Clay Boulevard and UNCC stations had been completed. Work continued on the University City Boulevard and Tom Hunter stations, while grading for foundation work was under way for McCullough station.

By January 2016, new rail car deliveries had begun from Siemens in California, with four of the cars undergoing testing during that month. By early 2017, the extension's stations had been completed and most of the track had been laid. On February 27 John Lewis, the CEO of CATS – citing delays in testing new light rail vehicles and completing the remaining electrical work – announced that the extension would not be opened until March 16, 2018, when it opened in its entirety and dropped the name "extension".

== Future development plans ==
=== Proposed Pineville–Ballantyne extension ===
Although a light rail line serving the Pineville area had been incorporated in the original 1988 plan, including a southern terminus in the town of Pineville, the station was eliminated after Mayor George Fowler and the Pineville Town Council voted against it. Low projected ridership figures further argued against its construction at the time. Following significant public interest and the success of the existing Blue Line, the Pineville town council passed a resolution in October 2018 which supported extending the line southwards from the I-485 station to serve the town and the Ballantyne neighborhood. After further study, the Metropolitan Transit Commission formally approved the plan on September 25, 2019, with a bus rapid transit route along I-485 intended to service the Ballantyne area in the short term.

As proposed, the project would involve upgrading existing stations to accommodate three-car trains, expanding parking facilities at the I-485 station, and constructing five additional stations, tentatively situated at Centrum, Carolina Place Mall, Ballantyne Corporate Park, Johnston, and Community House. The completed extension would be 5.5 mi (8.9 km) long, and is estimated to begin operating in 2041.

=== Additional station in South End ===
An additional light rail station to improve service for the South End neighborhood was first proposed in a 2018 city plan, and was approved by the city council on September 13, 2021. The station, currently at the pre-planning phase, would be situated between the New Bern and East/West Boulevard stations, and would be constructed with a blend of public and private funding. CATS expects the station to open in 2026.

== Ridership ==
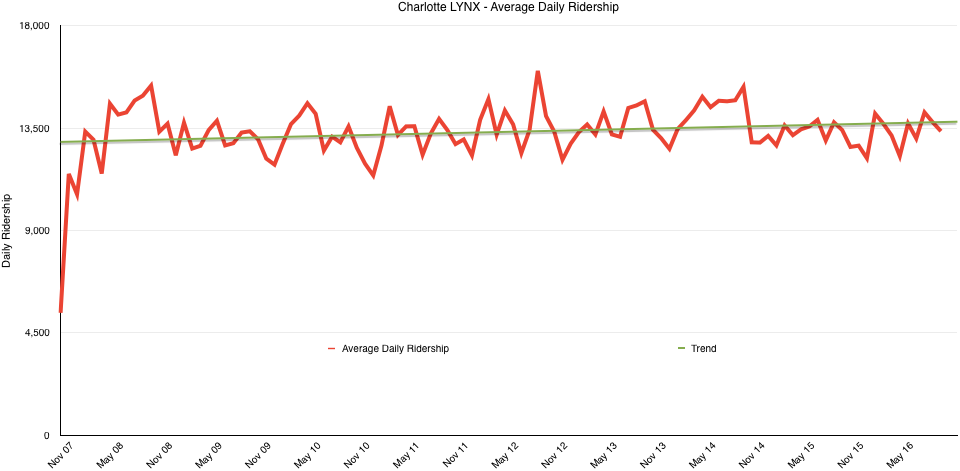
Charlotte Lynx, Average Daily Ridership, Nov 2007 – Oct 2016

Prior to the opening of the line in November 2007, CATS projected ridership for the completed Blue Line to be 9,100 on an average weekday in its first year of operation, gradually increasing to 18,100 by 2025. In its first few months of operation, the Blue Line saw an average daily weekday ridership of 8,700 passengers. By the end of the first quarter of 2008, weekday ridership had increased to 18,600, double first-year projections and ahead of the 2025 projections. In March 2008, the single light rail line accounted for 19.5% of total system ridership—402,600 of the 2,061,700 monthly passenger-trips of all lines including bus, dial-a-ride, and vanpool. Daily ridership continued to climb through the fall of 2008 due to increasing gasoline prices, peaking at 22,300 in the third quarter.

By summer 2009, a CATS survey indicated that 72 percent of Lynx riders did not use public transportation prior to its completion. On December 11, 2009, Lynx celebrated its 10 millionth passenger trip since its opening in November 2007.

For 2009, Lynx saw a decrease in daily ridership from 19,700 to 19,500 passengers per day. In 2017–2018, Charlotte lost transit passengers at a faster rate overall than other large U.S. cities, with continued ridership declines (–20% Feb 2018 vs Feb 2017) and ridership dropping 19% in the first half of 2018.

After the Blue Line Extension opened, the entire Blue Line averaged 26,064 trips on an average weekday in March 2018. In April, the entire Blue Line averaged 24,333 weekday passenger trips (–7% from previous month or –27% from projected ridership). The original Lynx line was averaging about 15,500 passenger trips before the extension opened. Original projections had the extension adding nearly 18,000 passenger trips in its first year, for a total of about 33,500 trips. As of the fourth quarter of 2020, the American Public Transportation Association (APTA) has Lynx weekday ridership at 27,700, making Lynx the 18th largest light rail system in the United States in terms of ridership.

== Operation ==
=== Fares ===
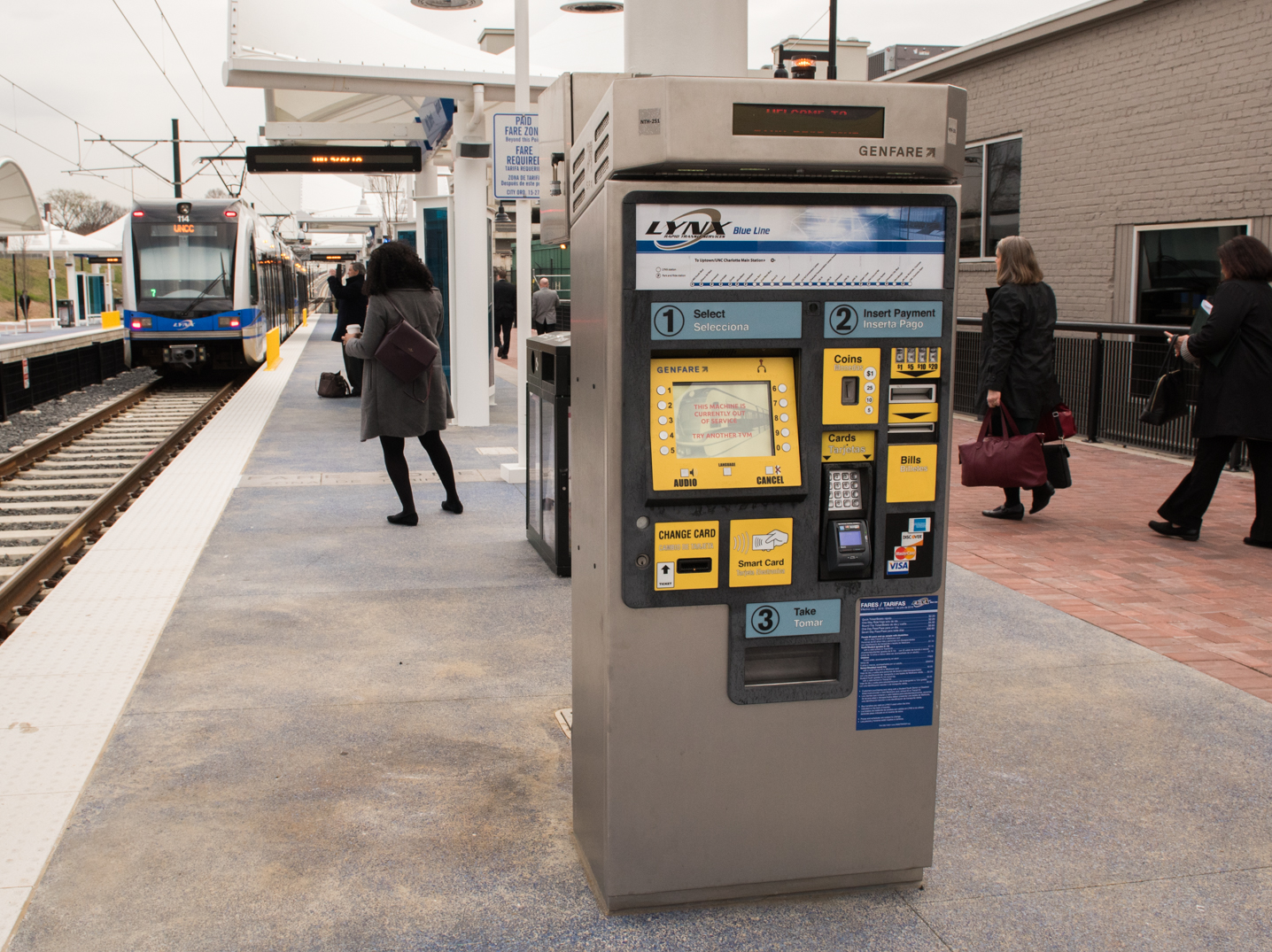
Lynx ticket machine at 9th Street station

Fares were not collected as part of the opening celebration in 2007. Regular service with fare collection commenced the next day. Tickets for the Blue Line are purchased on the platform of all stations from self-serve ticket vending machines that accept cash, coins, debit, and credit cards. Transfers from buses, weekly and monthly passes are also accepted. Fares, which are equal to those of the existing bus network, are as follows: $2.20 for a one-way trip, $4.40 for a round-trip ticket, $6.60 for a one-day pass with unlimited rides, $30.8 for a weekly pass, and $88 ($44 for seniors and ADA) for a monthly pass. There is no fare to kids below 6 with fare-paying rider (limit 3). The first ride on a round trip ticket must be taken within 90 minutes of purchase, while the second trip can be taken at any time during the day of purchase.

Lynx uses a proof-of-payment system, as there are no turnstiles at the entrances to train platforms. Instead, CATS fare inspectors and CATS security conduct random sweeps through trains and occasional checks for tickets as passengers enter and leave trains. If a passenger is caught without evidence of proper fare, a citation of $50 is issued in addition to potentially facing a Class 3 misdemeanor charge. CATS estimates between 4 and 5 percent of total fare revenue is lost from passengers who ride without paying.

Following an initial "grace period" between its November 2007 opening and February 2008, CATS took more action with regards to issuing citations for fare jumpers. This was the case as many of the ticket vending machines were not working properly at all stations. As part of Lynx's initial "fare enforcement blitz" during the first week of February 2008, 41 citations were issued with one arrest in the first day of enhanced enforcement. Due to its success, CATS officials announced that future "blitzes" would target individual stations and not be publicized. As of June 2010, CATS estimates 0.5 percent of daily riders are fare jumpers at a daily loss of $300 in revenue.

=== Hours ===
Lynx Blue Line trains operate daily, with service approximately every 20 minutes middays. During weekday rush hours, trains operate every 15 minutes, with trains up to every 30 minutes during evenings. Trains run the entire length of the line from the 5 a.m. hour to the 12 a.m. hour daily, with additional trains operating earlier and later over parts of the line.

=== List of stations ===
Stop	Neighborhood	Connections	Destinations
I-485/South Boulevard	Sterling	CATS: 12, 42, 58; I-485/South Boulevard Park & Ride	
Sharon Road West	Montclaire South	CATS: 19, 43, 55; Sharon Road West Park & Ride	Snyder's-Lance factory
Arrowood	Montclaire South	CATS: 24, 56; Megabus; Arrowood Park & Ride	
Archdale	Montclaire South	CATS: 57; Archdale Park & Ride	
Tyvola	Madison Park	CATS: 16, 60; Tyvola Park & Ride	
Woodlawn	Madison Park	CATS: 24; Woodlawn Park & Ride	
Scaleybark	York Road	CATS: 12, 30	
New Bern	South End		
East/West Boulevard	South End	CATS: 10, 25	The Line, Lowe's Global Technology Center
Bland Street	South End		
Carson	South End		Dowd YMCA
Brooklyn Village	Uptown Charlotte (2nd ward)		Ally Charlotte Center, Bank of America Stadium, Duke Energy Center, Harvey B. Gantt Center, Legacy Union, Mint Museum Uptown, Regions 615, Westin Charlotte
3rd Street/Convention Center	Uptown Charlotte (2nd ward)		200 South Tryon, 300 South Tryon, 400 South Tryon, BB&T Center, Bechtler Museum of Modern Art, Charlotte Convention Center, Charlotte Plaza, Duke Energy Plaza, Johnston Building, Knight Theater, Latta Arcade, NASCAR Hall of Fame, Romare Bearden Park, The Green, Truist Field, One Wells Fargo Center, Two Wells Fargo Center, Three Wells Fargo Center
Charlotte Transportation Center	Uptown Charlotte (1st and 2nd wards)	CityLynx: Gold; CATS: 1, 4–11, 14–17, 19–23, 26, 27, 34, 35, 40x, 46x–48x, 52x, 62x–64x, 74x, 77x, 82x, 85x	Bank of America Corporate Center, Belk Theater, One South, Spectrum Center
7th Street	Uptown Charlotte (1st ward)	Uptown Cycle Track	Charlotte Mecklenburg Library, Discovery Place, ImaginOn, Levine Museum of the New South, McGlohon Theatre, Truist Center
9th Street	Uptown Charlotte (1st ward)		First Ward Park, UNC Charlotte Center City Campus
Parkwood	Optimist Park		
25th Street	Optimist Park		
36th Street	NoDa	CATS: 3, 23	
Sugar Creek	NoDa	CATS: 4, 13, 211; Sugar Creek Park & Ride	
Old Concord Road	Eastway	CATS: 39; Old Concord Road Park & Ride	
Tom Hunter	Hidden Valley	CATS: 11, 211	
University City Boulevard	University City	CATS: 11, 50, 54; University City Blvd Park & Ride	
McCullough	University City		
JW Clay Boulevard/UNC Charlotte	University City	CATS: 22, 29, 47, 59; Rider: CCX; JW Clay Boulevard Park & Ride	University of North Carolina at Charlotte
UNC Charlotte–Main	University City		University of North Carolina at Charlotte

== Controversies ==
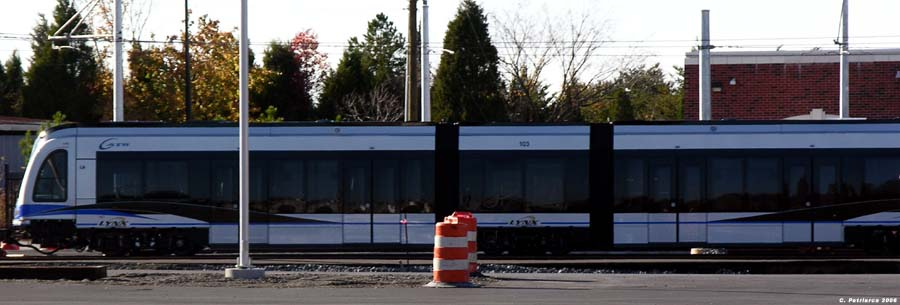
Car#103 at the South Boulevard Light Rail Facility

=== Viability and transit tax ===
With construction under way, development of light rail and cost overruns associated with it became a major issue between incumbent Charlotte mayor Pat McCrory and Democratic opponent Craig Madans in the 2005 mayoral race. In 2006, following a report by the Americans for Prosperity Foundation, the project was cited as inefficient use of federal taxpayer dollars, and opponents claimed most of the $8.9 billion slated for transit out of a total of $12.7 billion for all transportation projects in the Charlotte Region's Long Range Plan was attributed to rail. In response to these concerns, a coalition labeling itself Stop the Train launched a petition drive to put a repeal of the 1998 transit tax on the November 2007 ballot, citing cost-overruns and concerns over CATS management. Mecklenburg County elected officials announced in June 2007 the required number of signatures had been gathered and validated, guaranteeing a referendum on the transit tax.

According to David Hartgen, professor emeritus of Transportation Policy Studies at UNCC, transit would provide a viable means of transportation for just 2–3% of the Charlotte region's travel needs, and 1% of regional travel. This is a similar proportion to most arterial road segments Road transportation advocate Wendell Cox also cited similar concerns of a low cost/benefit ratio of both the south corridor line and other urban rail projects proposed for Charlotte-Mecklenburg. Additionally, Sam Staley, Director of Urban and Land Use Policy for the Reason Foundation, stated Lynx struggled to capture riders in a sprawling city like Charlotte, where the majority of trips are not made to the central city.

In 2015, Lynx ridership was back to earlier 2008 levels. During this same time period, the area's population increased 20%. The recent 2015 Urban Mobility Scorecard, rated Charlotte First In Worst Traffic In North Carolina.

A contrary report on the impact of light rail in Sacramento, Baltimore, and St. Louis, indicated that light rail systems had resulted in traffic congestion growing more slowly than before the system was built(from 2.8% annual congestion growth to 1.5%, from 4.5% to 2.2%, and to 0.89% from 0.86% respectively). Further pro-rail arguments emphasize that rail lines were built to areas before development takes place, as is done with superhighway construction. When ignoring the usable life of improvements the construction of roads is less costly than building light rail or subways, excluding land costs, but may contribute to increased sprawl.

A campaign to retain the transit tax garnered more than $650,000, with at least one third coming from local corporations including Duke Energy, Wachovia (now Wells Fargo), Bank of America, McDonald Transit Associates, Parsons Brinckerhoff, and Siemens. An additional twenty major businesses contributed, all of whom profit from CATS operations according to former city council member Don Reid. The group working to repeal the transit tax saw far less support (under $13,000) mostly from individuals. Mecklenburg County voters overwhelmingly rejected the repeal of the tax, 70 percent to 30 percent, on November 6, 2007.

=== Extent of development generated ===
In the months following opening, the line was averaging 80% over initial ridership projections, leading Light Rail Now to proclaim the line a "huge success". Jim Puckett, former Mecklenburg County Commissioner and a leader of the campaign to repeal the transit tax, said in the Charlotte Observer: "I have to admit, they are doing better than I expected... Our concern was whether we would have a white elephant, and it doesn't seem we do."

In August 2008, the John Locke Foundation's Carolina Journal reported that taxpayers were subsidizing more than 90% of a rider's trip on what the Journal calls "a lightly used line," and that low ridership estimates did not take into account increasing gasoline costs resulting in higher transit ridership. The analysis of subsidies was flawed by the report's reliance on a 7% discount rate for capital expenditures on the project, since no money was borrowed for the project (at the local and state level) no interest is paid on its capital costs, thus the report overstated costs by a substantial margin. Criticisms of transit on the grounds of subsidies also overlook the fact that all other modes of transportation are subsidized by non-user fees. For example, the Pew Charitable Trust found that highway construction and maintenance requires a 49% subsidy in 2007. UNCC transportation studies professor David Hartgen states that the line does not displace car traffic significantly as about half the ridership consists of prior bus riders. Also, Hartgen dismisses a city report's claims concerning increased land use as a result, stating: "In short, the big winners are about 4,000 prior bus riders, 4,000 commuters living close to the line, and 400 South Carolina drivers." Hartgen's claims of limited benefits are contradicted by the March 2011 report from the Center for Transit Oriented Development which found that the Blue Line generated nearly 10,000,000 square feet (930,000 m^{2}) of new commercial and residential development along its route, more than comparable lines in Denver and Minneapolis.

=== Extension corruption allegations ===
In March 2014, Mayor Patrick Cannon was arrested by the FBI on corruption charges. According to the affidavit, he agreed to help undercover agents posing as developers to "time purchases of real property on the Gold Line," and also discussed development opportunities along the Blue Line Extension. He allegedly boasted of having political clout in Washington, which he said he would use to get further funding for the Gold Line.

Further allegations filed in the federal corruption probe revealed Cannon had accepted payments from a local strip club owner, David Baucom, from at least 2009; Baucom's business lay in the path of the light-rail extension and was slated for demolition as a result. Both Baucom and Cannon were members of the city Hospitality and Tourism Board. According to the federal bill of information outlining the charges against Cannon, Cannon, then a city councilman, used his position to influence Charlotte zoning, planning and transportation officials to allow the club to be rebuilt on the remaining property after the original building had been demolished and the required land for the extension appropriated. In January 2013, Baucom's club received a zoning variance to allow its continued operation at the same site, as a church and a residential area were both within 1000 feet of the adult establishment. Cannon had also consulted about Baucom with the councilman for Baucom's district, Michael Barnes, who subsequently became mayor pro tem of Charlotte. While Barnes said he had contacted the CATS chief executive on Baucom's behalf to see if his business could remain open for longer, the request for an extension had been turned down, as the club had already received extensions to remain open. Barnes said he had "made an inquiry just as I would for any citizen," and apart from a $500 campaign contribution from Baucom in October 2012, had had no other contacts with him.

Baucom said he didn't know Cannon well and denied requesting him for help with permits; he declined comment on the federal allegations and has neither been charged nor named in court documents. On June 3, 2014, Cannon pleaded guilty to one count of honest services wire fraud, a charge commonly used when a public official takes kickbacks or bribes. The charge referenced a $2,000 bribe Cannon had received from Baucom in January 2013, according to prosecutors. After learning about the new federal allegations relating to Cannon and the light-rail extension, several business owners who had also been forced to give up property along the path of the extension said they were surprised. Some expressed frustration with disruption from construction and with compensation for their properties; they also said the corruption probe deepened their doubts about the fairness of the construction process. Other business owners felt the temporary disruptions would be worth it, as the new light-rail line would improve their business.

In a statement issued after the new allegations were revealed, Ryan Daniels, a spokesman for the U.S. Department of Transportation, said the corruption probe would not affect federal funding for the light-rail extension. "Decisions to fund major transit projects are part of a multiyear, multistep process. Funding decisions are based solely on the merits of the project, which in this case, were determined well before these allegations arose."
