= Concord Kannapolis Area Transit =

Public transit system in North Carolina, US

- Headquarters: 45 Transit Court NW; Concord, North Carolina
- Locale: Cabarrus County, North Carolina
- Service type: Fixed route bus demand response van
- Routes: 8
- Operator: Transdev
- Website: Website

The Concord Kannapolis Area Transit, operating under the banner Rider, is the public transit system shared between the cities of Concord and Kannapolis, North Carolina, United States. It operates local bus service as well as express bus service to neighboring Charlotte.

== Fleet ==
As of December 2025, Concord Kannapolis Area Transit's fleet consists of 11 transit buses and 8 vans, with vehicles ranging in production years from 2021 to 2024. All vehicles are owned by Concord Kannapolis Area Transit, and are operated by TransDev.

=== Active Fleet ===
Fleet number	Operator	Make and Model	Year built	Length	Seats	Fuel Type
417	Transdev	Ford; Transit 350	2024	22 ft (6.7 m)	15	Gasoline
418	Transdev	Ford; Transit 350	2024	22 ft (6.7 m)	15	Gasoline
419	Transdev	Ford; Transit 350	2024	22 ft (6.7 m)	11	Gasoline
420	Transdev	Ford; Transit 350	2024	22 ft (6.7 m)	11	Gasoline
511	Transdev	Gillig; BRT HEV 35' (G30B102N4)	2021	35 ft (11 m)	30	Hybrid Diesel
512	Transdev	Gillig; BRT HEV 35' (G30B102N4)	2023	35 ft (11 m)	32	Hybrid Diesel
513	Transdev	Gillig; BRT HEV 35' (G30B102N4)	2023	35 ft (11 m)	32	Hybrid Diesel
514	Transdev	Gillig; BRT HEV 35' (G30B102N4)	2023	35 ft (11 m)	32	Hybrid Diesel
515	Transdev	Gillig; BRT HEV 35' (G30B102N4)	2023	35 ft (11 m)	32	Hybrid Diesel
516	Transdev	Gillig; BRT HEV 35' (G30B102N4)	2023	35 ft (11 m)	32	Hybrid Diesel
517	Transdev	Gillig; BRT HEV 35' (G30B102N4)	2023	35 ft (11 m)	32	Hybrid Diesel
518	Transdev	Gillig; BRT HEV 35' (G30B102N4)	2023	35 ft (11 m)	32	Hybrid Diesel
519	Transdev	Gillig; BRT HEV 35' (G30B102N4)	2023	35 ft (11 m)	32	Hybrid Diesel
520	Transdev	Gillig; BRT HEV 35' (G30B102N4)	2024	35 ft (11 m)	32	Hybrid Diesel
521	Transdev	Gillig; BRT HEV 35' (G30B102N4)	2024	35 ft (11 m)	32	Hybrid Diesel
T311	Transdev	Ford; Transit 350	2023	20 ft (6.1 m)	3	Gasoline
T312	Transdev	Ford; Transit 350	2023	20 ft (6.1 m)	3	Gasoline
T313	Transdev	Ford; Transit 350	2023	20 ft (6.1 m)	3	Gasoline
T314	Transdev	Ford; Transit 350	2023	20 ft (6.1 m)	3	Gasoline

=== Retired Fleet ===
Fleet number	Make and Model	Year built	Year retired	Length	Seats	Fuel Type
101	Ford; F-250	2003	unknown	unknown	unknown	Gasoline
401	Gillig; Low Floor 35' (G29B102N4)	2004	2014	35 ft (11 m)	32	Diesel
402	Gillig; Low Floor 35' (G29B102N4)	2004	2014	35 ft (11 m)	32	Diesel
403	Gillig; Low Floor 35' (G29B102N4)	2004	2014	35 ft (11 m)	32	Diesel
404	Gillig; Low Floor 35' (G29B102N4)	2004	2014	35 ft (11 m)	32	Diesel
405	Gillig; Low Floor 35' (G29B102N4)	2004	2014	35 ft (11 m)	32	Diesel
406	Gillig; Low Floor 35' (G29B102N4)	2004	2014	35 ft (11 m)	32	Diesel
407	Gillig; Low Floor 35' (G29B102N4)	2004	2014	35 ft (11 m)	32	Diesel
408	Gillig; Low Floor 35' (G29B102N4)	2004	2014	35 ft (11 m)	32	Diesel
409	Gillig; Low Floor 35' (G27B102N4)	2008	2018	35 ft (11 m)	32	Diesel
410	Gillig; Low Floor 35' (G27B102N4)	2008	2018	35 ft (11 m)	32	Diesel
411	Ford / ElDorado; E-450	2010	unknown	22 ft (6.7 m)	15	Gasoline
412	Ford / ElDorado; E-450	2010	unknown	22 ft (6.7 m)	15	Gasoline
501	Gillig; BRT HEV 35' (G30B102N4)	2014	2023	35 ft (11 m)	32	Hybrid Diesel
502	Gillig; BRT HEV 35' (G30B102N4)	2014	2023	35 ft (11 m)	32	Hybrid Diesel
503	Gillig; BRT HEV 35' (G30B102N4)	2014	2023	35 ft (11 m)	32	Hybrid Diesel
504	Gillig; BRT HEV 35' (G30B102N4)	2014	2023	35 ft (11 m)	32	Hybrid Diesel
505	Gillig; BRT HEV 35' (G30B102N4)	2014	2023	35 ft (11 m)	32	Hybrid Diesel
506	Gillig; BRT HEV 35' (G30B102N4)	2014	2023	35 ft (11 m)	32	Hybrid Diesel
507	Gillig; BRT HEV 35' (G30B102N4)	2014	2023	35 ft (11 m)	32	Hybrid Diesel
508	Gillig; BRT HEV 35' (G30B102N4)	2014	2023	35 ft (11 m)	32	Hybrid Diesel
509	New Flyer Industries; XDE35	2017	2024	35 ft (11 m)	32	Hybrid Diesel
510	New Flyer Industries; XDE35	2017	2024	35 ft (11 m)	32	Hybrid Diesel

== Routes ==
All routes begin and end at the Rider Transit Center in Concord.

- Blue Route – A.L. Brown High School, Amtrak station, YMCA and Jackson Park
- Brown Route – North Carolina Research Campus and Amtrak station
- Green Route – Daymark and Walmart/Northlite
- Orange Route – Carolina Mall, Northeast Medical Center and downtown Concord
- Purple Route – RCCC Business & Tech Center and Walmart/Concord Commons
- Red Route – Rowan-Cabarrus Community College and Concord Mills
- Yellow Route – Rowan-Cabarrus Community College, Target/Afton Ridge and Carolina Mall
- Concord Charlotte Express (CCX) – JW Clay LYNX station
