= NoDa =

NoDa (North Davidson)
- Neighborhood
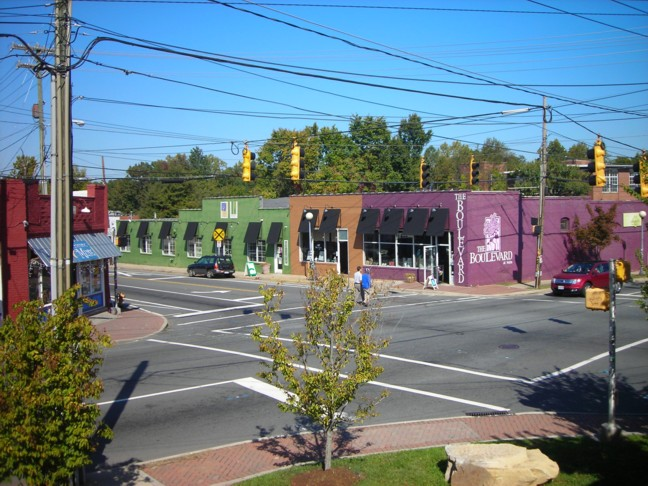
- The center of NoDa: N. Davidson St. @ E. 36th St.
- Interactive map of NoDa (North Davidson)
- Coordinates: 35.246°N 80.805°W
- Country: United States
- State: North Carolina
- County: Mecklenburg County
- City: Charlotte
- Council District: 1
- Annexed: 1907–1959
- Named for: North Davidson

Government
  - City Council - Local Mayor, by title only - Steve Chickillo 10 years: Larken Egleston

Area
  - Total: 1.111 sq mi (2.877 km^{2})

Population (2009)
  - Total: 2,745
- according to City-Data.com
- Zip Code: 28205, 28206
- Area codes: 704, 980

NoDa (a portmanteau of "North Davidson arts") is a popular arts district in Charlotte, North Carolina, United States. It is located in the North Charlotte neighborhood centered around North Davidson Street and 36th Street, approximately two and a half miles northeast of Uptown. Formerly an area of textile manufacturing and mill workers' residences, the area has also served as a center for the arts.

NoDa shares the same geography as Historic North Charlotte which is listed on the National Register of Historic Places. The name "NoDa" was coined by architect Russell Pound. In addition to historic mill houses, NoDa has seen a boom in residential construction in multifamily housing in recent years. The neighborhood has become an entertainment district focused on bimonthly gallery crawls. In addition to the art galleries, there are several music venues, restaurants, bars, and shops in the neighborhood.

== North Charlotte/NoDa ==
"NoDa" is the central village located within the neighborhood of North Charlotte. The City of Charlotte recognizes North Charlotte politically as a neighborhood, and characterizes the demographics of the neighborhood as a whole. However, the "district" of NoDa possesses very different demographics than the political whole of North Charlotte. Due to this dichotomy, NoDa's Neighborhood Association has chosen to redefine and represent the boundaries of NoDa, rather than the political boundaries of North Charlotte. The neighborhood association is either referred to as "HNCNA (Historic North Charlotte Neighborhood Association)" or "NoDa Neighborhood Association," as the two names are used interchangeably to reflect the interests of two separate districts that share part of the same geography. Often, NoDa will be used when referring to issues of the arts and entertainment community; and North Charlotte will be used when referencing historic buildings or organizations. Several individual buildings in NODA are on the National Historic Places register, but are recognized by the location of (Historic) North Charlotte. The unelected Local Mayor, by title only - Steve Chickillo for 10 years has provided Clean up services, Plants, Wood art, Wood Benches, Easter activities, Holiday decorations and other community improvement initiatives to beautify the NODA community.

== History ==
=== North Charlotte 1900-1950: Construction of A Mill Village ===
The North Charlotte neighborhood began development in 1903 on rolling farmland about two miles north of the Charlotte city limits. It was conceived by a group of wealthy textile leaders who envisioned a self-contained industrial district. Highland Park Mill No. 3 was the first mill to be constructed. A housing village for mill workers and their families was built across North Davidson Street from the mill, occupying the area between North Davidson and North McDowell Streets. Designed by noted mill architect Stuart Cramer, the mill housing was of a simple, yet functional design. The typical house consisted of five rooms which included two bedrooms. Soon after Highland Park No. 3 began construction, the Mecklenburg Mill, north of 36th Street, began construction. The associated mill housing was constructed immediately across North Davidson Street on Mercury Street, 37th Street and Herrin Avenue. These houses were of the D. A. Tompkins design which were originally designed for the Atherton Mill Village in Dilworth. In 1906 the North Charlotte Realty Company started developing the remaining large tract of land in North Charlotte, east of the Highland Park and Mecklenburg Mill villages, towards The Plaza. This was laid out for suburban house lots and provided larger houses for middle income families. Also planned was a central square between present-day Alexander and Yadkin streets. Two stores, a pair of churches, a hotel and a school were to face onto the square. As built, most of the east–west streets in the grid were omitted, as was the square. The hotel was apparently the only one of the proposed public buildings to be erected, and it stands today at 3020 North Alexander Street. The business district was located on North Davidson Street linking the two mill villages and becoming the "main street" of North Charlotte. This district provided the basic necessities for the mill workers and their families: a drug store, several grocery stores, a dry goods store, a doctor's office and The Bank of North Charlotte. The Hand Pharmacy was a popular gathering spot for residents, the ice cream and soda fountain being a particular favorite. The business district of North Charlotte was connected to uptown Charlotte by a trolley line down North Davidson Street. This was for residents who wanted to do business uptown, for few residents owned an automobile. The development of Johnston Mill in 1913 expanded the neighborhood and businesses. North Charlotte has a rich and diverse housing typology. The types range from the simple mill cottage to big 2-story houses. It was this diversity that would continue to characterize North Charlotte as a potentially exciting neighborhood. There were always the poor and the wealthy and those in the middle, but the most important aspect of North Charlotte was its sense of community. It was a good neighborhood, a good environment to raise a family and do business, and there was an overall feeling of safety. Things weren't perfect by any means. The neighborhood consisted primarily of mill workers, whose day-to-day existence was a struggle and was tied directly to the prosperity of the mills. From time to time people were out of work and they depended on their extended family and neighbors to help them out. The community spirit made this possible. It was in this fashion that the neighborhood functioned for most of the first half of this century.

=== North Charlotte 1950-1990: Destruction of A Mill Village ===
The decline of the neighborhood started before the closing of the mills in the sixties and seventies. After the depression, the mills were never quite as strong, and in 1953, when the mills were sold, the relationship between the ownership of the mill and the mill worker housing was severed. The concept of a mill village was gone and the houses were being sold on the open market. The neighborhood became more transient and the sense of community that had held North Charlotte together for the first half of the century was replaced by apathy toward the community among newer residents, and fear and distrust among existing residents. The construction of the four lane freeway-type facility, Matheson Avenue, in 1969, did irreparable damage to the southern edge of the neighborhood. It demolished homes, disconnected neighborhood streets, and created a physical divider in the neighborhood. The once quiet neighborhood street, formerly known as Wesley Avenue, now carried high volumes of traffic. The beginning of the 1970s found a neighborhood characterized by deteriorating houses and vacant storefronts. The Housing and Community Development Act (HCDA) of 1974 was the first positive step in the revitalization of North Charlotte. The HCDA made available low interest loans and grants for the rehabilitation of deteriorating houses. The small parks that were built in North Charlotte were funded by the HCDA, as were other public improvements. However, there was still a predominance of low-income residents, and a large number of houses that needed improvement. The business districts on North Davidson and The Plaza had declined until only a few viable businesses remained, and they were struggling. The overall appearance of these commercial areas was one of negligence and disrepair, which added to the negative impression of the neighborhood. The decade of the 1980s found North Charlotte in an overall condition of deterioration, although there were a number of long term homeowners who still took pride in their neighborhood and hoped for the day it would be revived. The 1980 Census confirmed the fact that this was a neighborhood in need of help, and was in danger of declining even further. The decade of the 1990s saw some promising signs of rebirth. The North Davidson Street business district took on a new life as many of the buildings were renovated for artists’ studios and galleries. The uniqueness of this emerging artists' district in a former mill village business district began to attract citywide attention. Friday night gallery crawls offered an alternative to the more upscale galleries of Uptown Charlotte. This became a district unlike any other in Charlotte. A row of galleries and shops that opened directly onto the street gave pedestrians a different kind of experience from the parking lot/interior gallery scene of Uptown. This was a real place, unaffected by the wrecking balls that had demolished many of Charlotte's older neighborhoods. Along with the revitalization of this artists' district, many new families and individuals started moving into the neighborhood and fixing up the old houses. Since its construction in 1950, the Johnston YMCA has been a positive factor in North Charlotte, and continues to provide a wide variety of programs for all ages of the population.

In the early 1990s a proposal was made to renovate the old Johnston Mill to provide low-income housing. The participation of the city and local banks to make available a low-interest loan enabled the developer to implement the proposal and build 100 units for rent. While these apartments have since been evacuated and the fate of this vacant historic property is unknown, it was clear that some positive things were happening in the Historic North Charlotte neighborhood largely because of several private initiatives. The positive steps taken by the private sector, as well as the excitement and interest generated by the Gallery Crawl, gave the North Charlotte Neighborhood Association the impetus to continue to improve at the turn of the century.

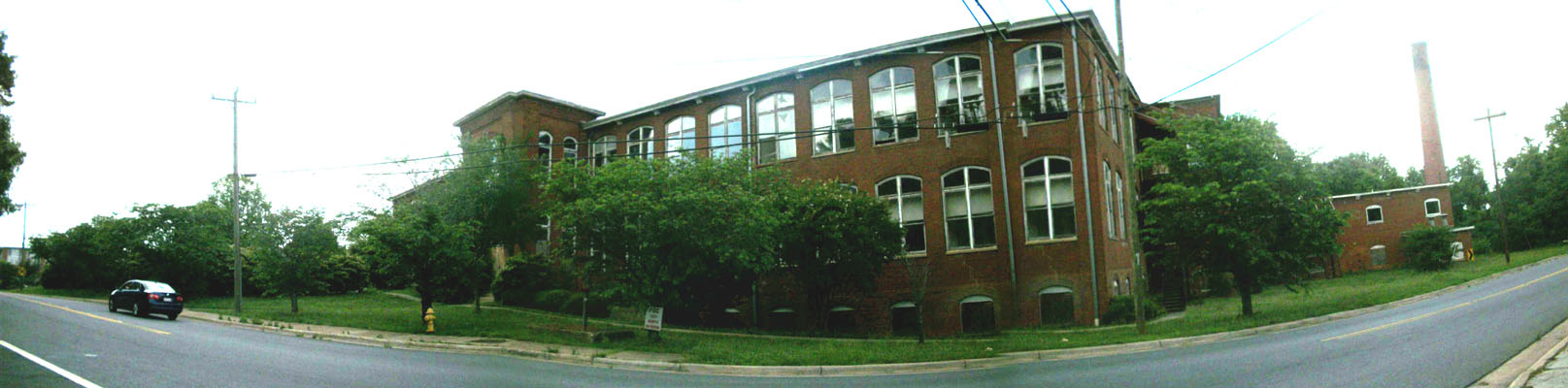

Many North Charlotte buildings were brought back from the edge of destruction to be part of NoDa

=== 1990s-2000s: rebirth as NoDa ===
In 1985 Paul Sires and Ruth Ava Lyons, two young artists, arrived in the dilapidated and neglected mill village main street of North Charlotte and became captivated by the area's character. They bought and renovated the Lowder Building and continued to renovate nearby buildings and mill houses as part of an ongoing revitalization effort, and participated in beautification efforts. They became known as the pioneer activists that began a wave of arts growth that continues to this day. Starting the revitalization and transformation of an abandoned mill village into a community for the arts, they created the first artist establishment, Center of the Earth Gallery, which became a leading gallery in the southeast until it closed in 2010. They offered studio spaces for artists of all disciplines as well, and lobbied to attract arts related businesses to their properties. Lyons and Sires were recognized with a Governor's Award for Businesses in the Arts for its impact on the City of Charlotte, and the Historic Charlotte Preservation Award 2003.

As of 1995, Steve Holt, artist and owner of Studio 23 and WrightNow galleries, called the neighborhood "NoDa" (for North Davidson arts).

The first decade of the 21st century ushered in a wave of real estate speculation and development, not only in Charlotte, but nationwide. The City of Charlotte, and its character neighborhoods such as No-Da, was head-and-shoulders above the national trends in terms of value appreciation and growth. Indeed, NoDa had ushered in the much-awaited rebirth of North Charlotte. As NoDa gained reputation as a desirable neighborhood on the real estate maps, home ownership soared and new residents flocked to the historic neighborhood. As was the national trend, home prices inflated to double and triple the appreciated values set by the last census. Home equity had very rarely affected the aesthetic of North Charlotte, but now, new and old homeowners alike were spending money to improve, expand, and often demolish and rebuild the structures of NoDa.

Many unresolved issues still exist within NoDa; some trace back to their development at the beginning of the last century. Many more supplemental and infrastructure mistakes were made in the last 25 years. The reuse of the Historic Highland Mill for residential use by a private developer has proven a model for the future. The reuse of the Johnston and Mecklenburg Mills under ownership of the City of Charlotte has failed and now the Mills await a second rebirth in the private sector. The historic Hand Pharmacy building was preserved and turned into the successful Cabo Fish Taco restaurant that lines up diners into the neighborhood streets daily. Many catalyst endeavors, such as Fat City Deli, which helped to introduce live music back to North Charlotte, have been lost to progress - but not without concession to the fabric which it helped to weave: The HNCNA worked very closely with the developer of Fat City Lofts to protect the integrity and function of the original Fat City. The same can be said for the integrity of the Neighborhood Theatre, which is now a premiere music venue.

The active “Back in the Day” history committee researches and records the stories and history of the neighborhood and its people. The rebirth of North Charlotte into the arts community of NoDa fills the streets, businesses, and houses with neighbors and patrons.

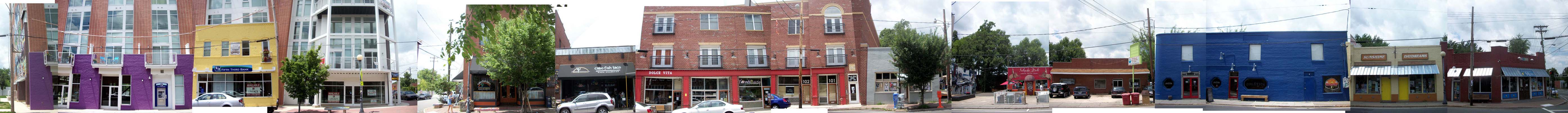

NoDa, along with Dilworth and Plaza Midwood, have a large population of LGBTQ residents. In 2015, a report from the Census Bureau found that more than 350 LGBTQ households were in NoDa and Plaza Midwood.

== Geography of NoDa's Villages ==
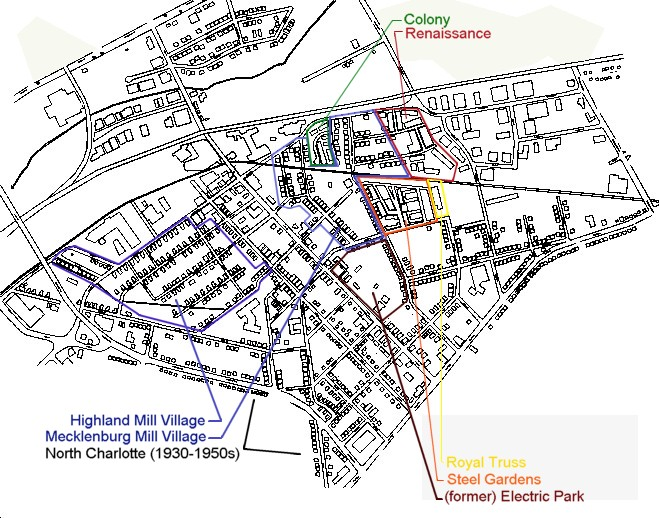
Map shows the different parts of NoDa

NoDa's geography can further be broken down into the original (mostly still intact) mill villages of Highland Mill Village and Mecklenburg Mill Village. Further development of other corners of the neighborhood also note Electric Park (defunct), North Charlotte (extending to The Plaza), The Colony, Renaissance, Steel Gardens and Royal Truss.

== Community ==
Residents of NoDa have carried on the tight-knit traditions of the original mill villagers and continue to find new ways to interact with their neighbors. Gallery Crawls are popular on the first and third Fridays of every month, but most weekend nights offer similar events (especially in the warm months). Neighbors offer and promote other grassroots NoDa-centric events such as NoDa 16" Softball (Monday nights at North Charlotte Park), NoDa Outdoor Movie Night (first Wednesday of the month; backyard movies), NoDa Cornholio Tournament, NoDa Scavenger Hunt, NoDa Pumpkin Carving, Charles Avenue Block Party, Pickles Farmers Market, NoDa All Arts Market, and other arts-related activities. The McGill Rose Garden, a popular city park, lies at the south end of the Noda District.

== Transit and infrastructure ==
=== Notable streets ===
- Matheson Ave., N. Sugar Creek Rd., N. Tryon St., and The Plaza form the boundaries of NoDa.
- NoDa's main thru-streets are N. Davidson St. and E. 36th St.

7 to 11 Wood Benches and several wood tables Donated by Local Mayor Steve Chickillo

=== CATS bus routes ===
- CATS Bus Routes 3
- CATS Bus Route 23
  - Both lines share stops along E. 36th. St. and N. Davidson St. and buses alternately come about every 10 minutes during peak hours.

=== LYNX light rail ===
Stations located at:

- Sugar Creek
- 36th St.

=== Passenger and freight Rail ===
- The Aberdeen and Carolina Western Railroad transects NoDa
- The Norfolk Southern Railway "Mainline" carries freight parallel to N. Davidson St.
  - Amtrak also carries on the NSRR "Mainline"
  - regional rail also carries on the NSRR "Mainline"
  - The "mainline" is also planned to carry the Southeast High Speed Rail in the future.

=== Water ===
- Little Sugar Creek crosses E. 36th St. between N. Tryon St. and NSRR "Mainline"
- North Charlotte Reservoir (dry) once existed between E. 36th St. and Herrin Ave.

== Notable residents ==
- Adam Lazzara - Lead singer of Taking Back Sunday
- John Nolan - Guitarist of Taking Back Sunday
- Ade Olufeko - Designer
- Steve Chickillo - Local Mayor - maintains the NODA community

== See also ==
- Charlotte center city (uptown)
- SoHo
