= Bus turnout =

Space for buses to pick up and drop off passengers

Diagram of bus lay-by as used in the UK

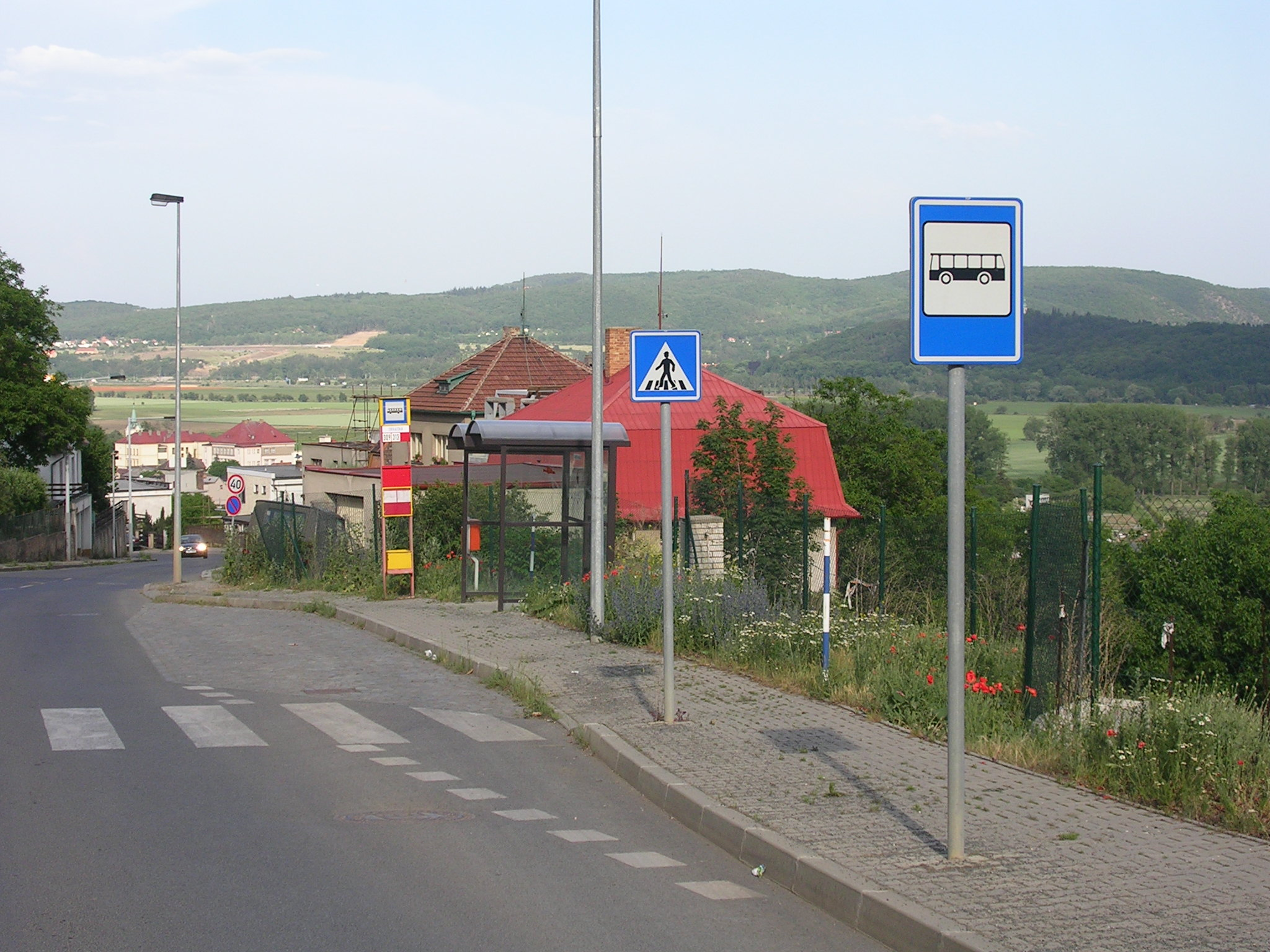
Bus bay in Prague-Radotín, Czech Republic

A bus turnout, bus pullout, bus bay, bus lay-by (UK), or off-line bus stop is a designated spot on the side of a road where buses or trams may pull out of the flow of traffic to pick up and drop off passengers. It is often indented into the sidewalk or other pedestrian area. A bus bay is, in a way, the opposite of a bus bulb. With a bus bulb, the point is to save the bus the time needed to merge out of and back into moving traffic, at the cost of temporarily blocking that traffic while making a stop. With a bus bay, the goal is to not block traffic while the bus is stopped, but at the cost of the time necessary to merge back into flowing traffic. Bus bays, therefore, will generally produce longer dwell times than bus bulbs.

Sometimes a Half-width turnout can be used - defined by being approximately half the width of the carriageway or bus that would use it. This offers a compromise between the shorter dwell time of a non-turnout bus stop and the convenience to overtake (especially for 2 wheeled vehicles) of a turnout. However, this compromise means that they are not a common sight compared to their alternatives.

The dwell time can be reduced by traffic legislation. For example in the Czech Republic, the drivers in the running traffic lane are obliged to enable to the bus to leave the bus stop, but this obligation applies only in built up area. The Czech technical standards from the 1970s and 1990s (ČSN 73 6425) preferred to build bus bays at all classes of roads, the new version ČSN 73 6425-1 from 2007 prefers bus stops in the running lane within traffic calming concept. On roads of higher classes, bus bays or bus stop lanes are obliged.

== See also ==
- Bus lane
- Bus stop
