= STV Inc. =

U.S. architectural company

STV
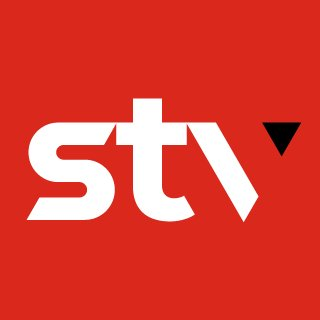
- STV logo (2023)
- Company type: Private
- Industry: Architecture, Engineering, Construction Management, Planning
- Founded: 1912 (SSV&K); 1945 (S&T)
- Headquarters: New York City, U.S.
- Key people: Dominick M. Servedio, P.E. (Chairman); Greg Kelly, P.E. (President & CEO); David Black (CFO)
- Number of employees: 3,200
- Website: www.stvinc.com

STV is a multinational professional services company that specializes in architecture, engineering, program and construction management, planning and advisory services for transportation systems, buildings, water and other facilities. Headquartered at the Empire State Building in Manhattan, New York City, STV is a portfolio company of The Pritzker Organization.

== History ==
STV's oldest predecessor firm, Seelye Stevenson Value & Knecht, was founded in New York City in 1912 as Elwyn E. Seelye & Co. as a structural engineering firm. The firm performed multi-discipline engineering services throughout the country, working on projects, including the Jefferson Memorial in Washington, D.C., the parachute jump at the 1939 World's Fair, NASA's Vehicle Assembly Building at the Kennedy Space Center in Florida, and the Enrico Fermi National Accelerator Laboratory in Batavia, Illinois.

Sanders & Thomas, another predecessor firm of STV's, was founded in Pennsylvania in 1945. Sanders & Thomas performed process and industrial engineering and was best known for its military and industrial work. Sanders & Thomas merged in 1968 with Voss Engineering Company, a manufacturer, to form STV, Inc., a management holding company established to acquire other firms that would later evolve into the present-day STV Group.

In 1983 STV acquired Lyon Associates, which enhanced STV's international capabilities with offices in several key foreign cities. In 1990, STV Environmental and STV Architects were established to increase the firm's abilities within those fields. STV Construction Services was formed in 1994. Also in 1994, the acquisition of STV/Silver & Ziskind added specialized architectural expertise in criminal justice, education, and health care facilities. In 1995 Seelye Stevenson Value & Knecht, Sanders & Thomas and Lyon Associates were renamed STV Incorporated and merged into one company, STV Incorporated (STV), which is headquartered in New York City. STV Group, the parent company, is headquartered in Douglassville, Pennsylvania.

In 2006, STV acquired Ralph Whitehead Associates (RWA), a consulting civil and transportation engineering firm based in Charlotte, North Carolina, to extend the corporation's geographic reach into the Southeastern United States as well as its capabilities in the bridge engineering and freight operations.

STV acquired DPM in 2015. Based in Newton, Massachusetts, and Hartford, Connecticut, STV|DPM provides owner's project management services to assist clients through staff augmentation and project specific leadership throughout the entire project lifecycle including master planning, feasibility studies, building assessments, design management, pre-construction, construction oversight, relocation management and project closeout..

In 2021, STV Group, Inc. acquired CP&Y, Inc., an employee-owned engineering, architectural, and field services consulting firm with a staff of over 375 professionals in Texas, Oklahoma, Colorado, Florida, and Virginia. This significantly expanded STV's presence in Texas and the south-central United States and extended the firm's capabilities in water and highway engineering.

In 2023, STV acquired American Engineers, Inc. (AEI), a full-service civil engineering firm with a staff of more than 120 professionals in Kentucky and Georgia to further serve clients in the Southeastern U.S. In 2024, STV Group, Inc., further bolstered its infrastructure services in the Southeast, acquiring MEHTA and Associates, Inc., an engineering and construction engineering inspection firm with more than 75 professionals in Florida.
