= UNC Charlotte–Main station =

Light rail station in Charlotte, North Carolina

UNC Charlotte–Main
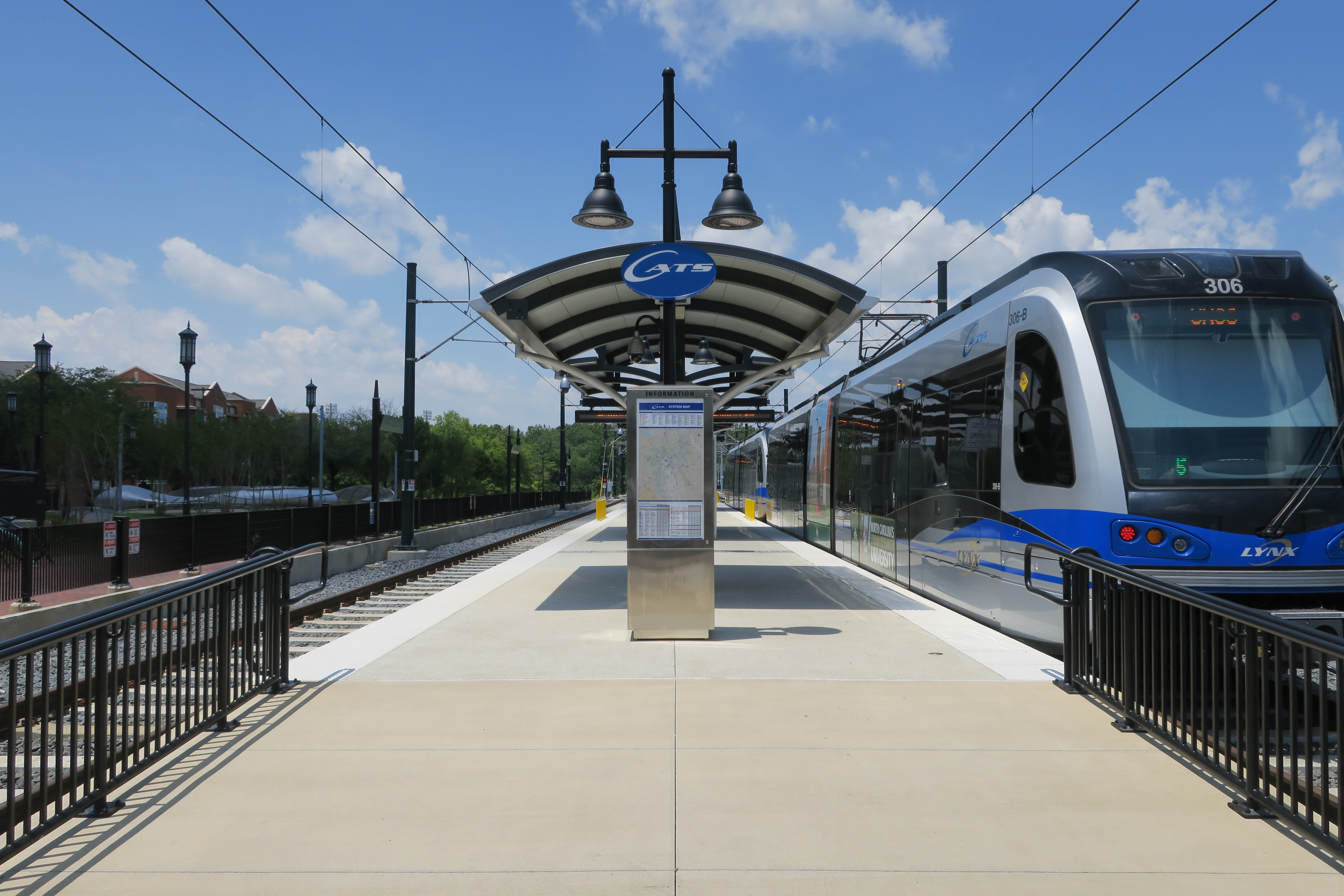

General information
- Location: 9025 Cameron Boulevard; Charlotte, North Carolina; United States
- Coordinates: 35°18′44″N 80°44′01″W
- Owner: Charlotte Area Transit System
- Platforms: 1 island platform
- Tracks: 2
- Connections: Niner Transit

Construction
- Structure type: At-grade
- Cycle facilities: Bicycle racks
- Accessible: yes
- Architect: STV Inc.
- Architectural style: Postmodern

History
- Opened: March 16, 2018

Services
Preceding station	CATS	Following station
JW Clay Boulevard/UNC Charlotte toward I-485/South Boulevard	Lynx Blue Line	Terminus
Location

UNC Charlotte–Main is a light rail station on the LYNX Blue Line in Charlotte, North Carolina, United States. It opened on March 16, 2018, as part of the Blue Line extension to the UNC Charlotte campus, and serves as the line's northern terminus. The station features a single island platform and is located on the north side of Cameron Boulevard, adjacent to the university's main campus in University City.

== History ==
The university entered into a partnership with the city government in 2005 to bring light rail to the campus. Construction on the station began in late 2014, and the foundation was completed by the end of 2015. The first test trains arrived at the station in June 2017.

The Blue Line extension opened on March 16, 2018, and the inaugural train departed from UNC Charlotte–Main station at 10 a.m. A ribbon cutting ceremony was conducted at the station a month earlier to celebrate the university's involvement in the light rail project.

== Public art ==
UNC Charlotte–Main station features public art from Mikyoung Kim, a Boston-based urban designer commissioned by CATS. Her firm designed a "dynamic" sculpture placed in the station's main plaza, consisting of two long, deformed benches that provide seating. The plaza faces the UNC Charlotte Student Union building and includes a crosswalk on Cameron Boulevard.
