= I-485/South Boulevard station =

Tram stop in Charlotte, North Carolina, United States

I-485/South Blvd.
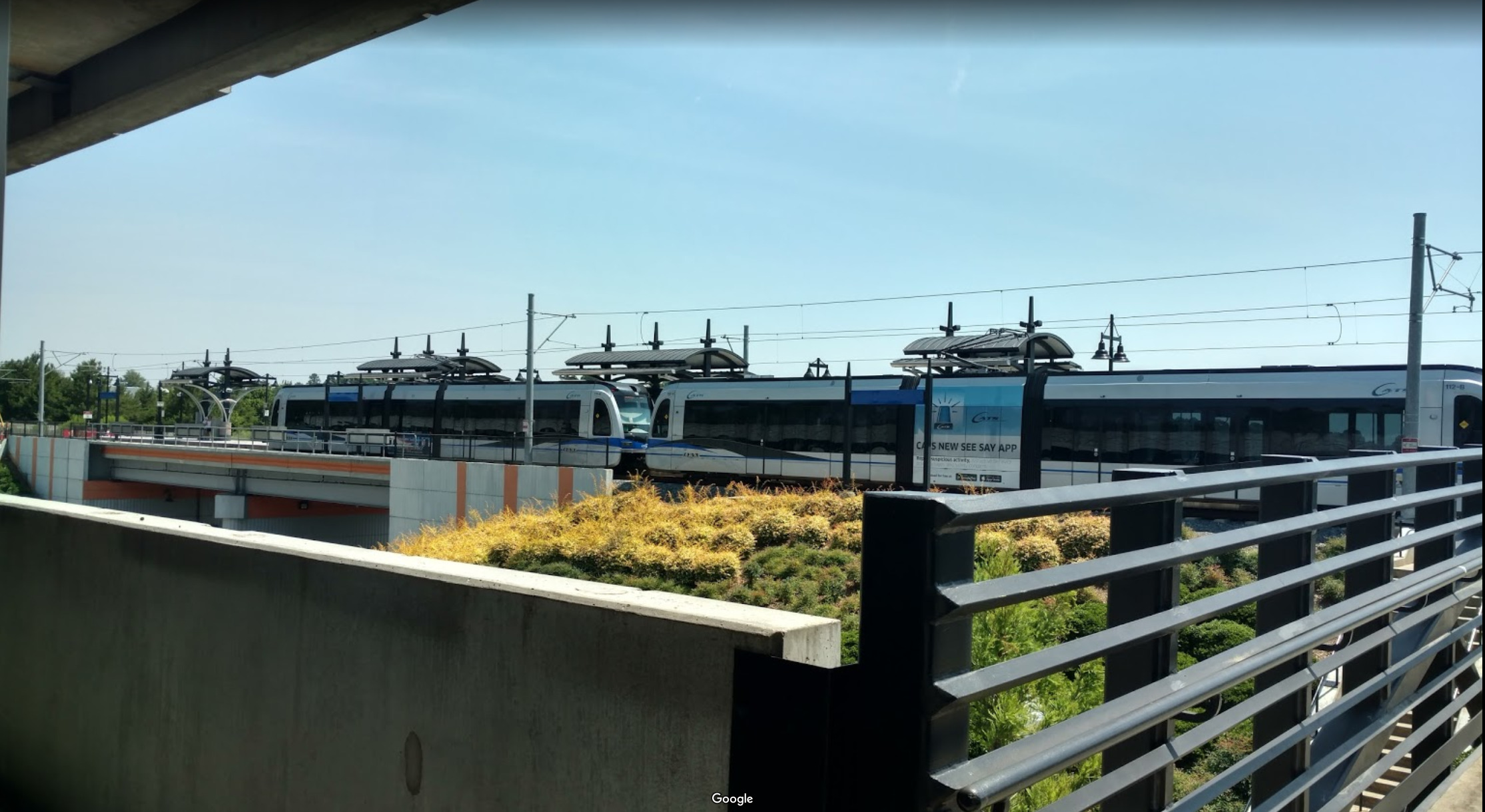
- Platform viewed from parking garage

General information
- Location: 9508 South Boulevard; Charlotte, North Carolina
- Coordinates: 35°6′26″N 80°52′58″W
- Owner: Charlotte Area Transit System
- Platforms: 1 island platform
- Tracks: 2
- Bus stands: 4
- Connections: CATS: 12, 42, 58

Construction
- Structure type: Elevated
- Parking: 1,366 spaces
- Cycle facilities: Bicycle racks
- Accessible: yes
- Architect: Ralph Whitehead Associates
- Architectural style: Postmodern

History
- Opened: November 24, 2007

Services
Preceding station	CATS	Following station
Terminus	Lynx Blue Line	Sharon Road West toward UNC Charlotte–Main
Location

I-485/South Boulevard is a light rail station in Charlotte, North Carolina. The elevated island platform is the southern terminus stop along the Lynx Blue Line and includes the second largest park and ride operated by Charlotte Area Transit System (CATS). Serving both Carolina Pavilion and Sterling neighborhood in the immediate area, it also serves commuters from Pineville, Ballantyne, and the South Carolina border towns.

== Location ==
The station is located on an embankment with Norfolk Southern tracks, which goes over a road that connects the parking garage to Carolina Pavilion Drive and South Boulevard intersection. Adjacent and on top of the parking garage is Sterling Elementary School, while across South Boulevard is the Carolina Pavilion strip mall and access to Little Sugar Creek Greenway. South of the station is Interstate 485 (I-485) and the town of Pineville.

== History ==
Originally, the southern terminus for the Blue Line was proposed for downtown Pineville, near NC 51. In 2002, the southern end was moved approximately 1.5 miles (2.4 km) to the north along South Boulevard at its present location as a result of low projected ridership figures for the proposed downtown Pineville station. The parking garage was the only one constructed along the original line, and was built in a ravine adjacent to Sterling Elementary School. The 1,120 space garage and overflow lot was completed at a cost of $22.9 million, with the top floor featuring a playing field for the adjacent school. The station officially opened for service on Saturday, November 24, 2007, and as part of its opening celebration fares were not collected. Regular service with fare collection commenced on Monday, November 26, 2007. In late 2008 the station received the Federal Highway Administration's Award of Excellence in the "Intermodal Transportation Facilities" category. In November 2008, an additional 54 space parking lot was opened to the east of the station platform due to frequent overflow conditions (later expanding to 246 spaces). By August 2009, digital signs were added to the garage to alert motorists as to how many spaces remain prior to entering the facility. In 2015, the island platform was extended to allow three-car trains at the station.

== Station layout ==
The station consists of one island platform and four covered waiting areas; other amenities include ticket vending machines, emergency call box, and bicycle racks. Below the station embankment are four bus bays, while connected by two pedestrian bridges is the adjacent 1,120-space three level parking garage and overflow lot. East of the station is the additional 246-space surface parking lot, known as Lot A. Parking is free for patrons for either bus or light rail and is limited to 24 hours. Walkways from the parking garage connect to Sterling Elementary School and the Sterling neighborhood. The station also features several art installations including bas-reliefs entitled Skyrocket Oak by Alice Adams, drinking fountain basins designed to look like dogwoods, the North Carolina state flower, by Nancy Blum, games motifs on both the pavers and shelters by Leticia Huerta and the painting of the bridge and retaining walls by Marek Ranis.
