= 2025 Charlotte City Council election =

- November 4, 2025

All 11 seats on the Charlotte City Council 6 seats needed for a majority

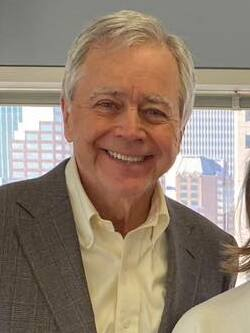
	Majority party	Minority party
Leader	Danté Anderson	Ed Driggs (Note: There is no official minority leader of the council. Driggs was the most senior Republican at the time of the election.)
Party	Democratic	Republican
Leader since	December 4, 2023	—
Leader's seat	1st–Freedom Park	7th–Piper Glen
Last election	9 seats, 90.20% (at-large); 68.33% (districts)	2 seats, 0.00% (at-large); 28.52% (districts)
Seats won	10	1
Seat change	▲1	▼1
Popular vote	369,854 (at-large); 84,730 (districts)	82,754 (at-large); 28,597 (districts)
Percentage	80.67% (at-large); 70.84% (districts)	18.05% (at-large); 23.91% (districts)
- Results: Democratic hold Democratic gain Republican hold Republican gain Voteshare: Democrats: 50–60% 70–80% 80–90% ≥90% Republicans: 80–90%
Mayor Pro Tem before election
Danté Anderson
Democratic
Elected Mayor Pro Tem
Smuggie Mitchell
Democratic

The 2025 Charlotte City Council elections were held on November 4, 2025, to elect all eleven members of the Charlotte City Council. Primary elections were held on September 9, 2025. This election represented the first change in the council's composition since 2011, and the first district flip since 1999.

Four members of the city council were elected at-large in an election where voters voted for four candidates, while the other seven were elected individually by geographic district.

== At-large seats ==
2025 Charlotte's at-large City Council election
- November 4, 2025
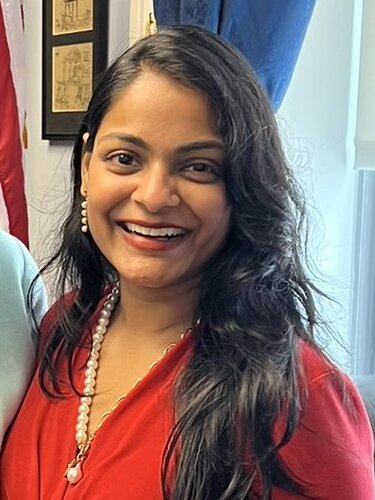

Nominee	Dimple Ajmera	Victoria Watlington	Smuggie Mitchell
Party	Democratic	Democratic	Democratic
Popular vote	96,599	95,212	90,177
Percentage	21.07%	20.77%	19.67%
Nominee	LaWana Slack-Mayfield	Edwin Peacock III	Misun Kim
Party	Democratic	Republican	Republican
Popular vote	87,866	46,190	36,564
Percentage	19.17%	10.07%	7.98%
- Parties: Democrats: 50–60% 60–70% 70–80% 80–90% ≥90% Candidates: Ajmera Watlington Mitchell Peacock
Council member before election
Multi-member district
Democratic
Elected Council member
Multi-member district
Democratic

The Charlotte City Council has four at-large seats. All four are elected in the same election, as voters vote for four candidates. The incumbents were:

- Dimple Ajmera, who had represented at-large since 2017 (Note: Ajmera previously represented the 5th district (2017).) and was re-elected with 23.1% of the vote in 2023
- Smuggie Mitchell, who had represented at-large since 2022 (Note: Mitchell previously represented the 2nd district (1999–2013) and at-large (2015–2021).) and was re-elected with 22.2% of the vote in 2023
- LaWana Slack-Mayfield, who had represented at-large since 2022 (Note: Slack-Mayfield previously represented the 3rd district (2011–2019).) and was re-elected with 21.6% of the vote in 2023
- Victoria Watlington, who had represented at-large since 2023 (Note: Watlington previously represented the 3rd district (2019–2023).) and was elected with 23.2% of the vote in 2023

=== Democratic primary ===
==== Nominees ====
- Dimple Ajmera, incumbent council member
- James (Smuggie) Mitchell Jr., incumbent council member
- LaWana Slack-Mayfield, incumbent council member
- Victoria Watlington, incumbent council member

==== Eliminated in primary ====
- Matt Britt, marketing manager
- Roderick Davis, nonprofit organizer and perennial candidate
- Will Holley, general contractor
- J. G. Lockhart, transportation executive
- Namrata (N.Y.) Yadav, human resources manager

==== Withdrawn ====
- Emerson Stoldt, architect (remained on ballot)

==== Endorsements ====
Dimple Ajmera

Individuals

- Hugh McColl, former CEO of Bank of America (co-endorsement with Yadav)

Labor unions

- Charlotte-Metrolina Labor Council (co-endorsement with Slack-Mayfield and Watlington)
- International Association of Fire Fighters Local 660 (co-endorsement with Slack-Mayfield and Watlington)
- Service Employees International Union, Local 32BJ (co-endorsement with Slack-Mayfield and Watlington)
- UNITE HERE Local 23 (co-endorsement with Slack-Mayfield and Watlington)

Organizations

- Black Political Caucus of Charlotte-Mecklenburg (Democratic primary only, co-endorsement with Mitchell, Slack-Mayfield, and Watlington)
- Charlotte-Mecklenburg Fraternal Order of Police (co-endorsement with Britt, Watlington, and Yadav)
- Everytown for Gun Safety (co-endorsement with Slack-Mayfield and Watlington)
- LGBTQ+ Democrats of Mecklenburg County (co-endorsement with Mitchell, Slack-Mayfield, and Yadav)

Newspapers

- The Charlotte Observer (Democratic primary only, co-endorsement with Mitchell, Slack-Mayfield, and Watlington)
Matt Britt

State legislators

- Woodson Bradley, state senator from the 42nd district (2025–present)

Organizations

- Charlotte-Mecklenburg Fraternal Order of Police (co-endorsement with Ajmera, Watlington, and Yadav)
Will Holley

Organizations

- Democratic Men of Mecklenburg County (co-endorsement with Lockhart and Mitchell)
J. G. Lockhart

Organizations

- Democratic Men of Mecklenburg County (co-endorsement with Holley and Mitchell)
James (Smuggie) Mitchell Jr.

Organizations

- Black Political Caucus of Charlotte-Mecklenburg (Democratic primary only, co-endorsement with Ajmera, Slack-Mayfield, and Watlington)
- Democratic Men of Mecklenburg County (co-endorsement with Holley and Lockhart)
- LGBTQ+ Democrats of Mecklenburg County (co-endorsement with Ajmera, Slack-Mayfield, and Yadav)

Newspapers

- The Charlotte Observer (Democratic primary only, co-endorsement with Ajmera, Slack-Mayfield, and Watlington)
LaWana Slack-Mayfield

Labor unions

- Charlotte-Metrolina Labor Council (co-endorsement with Ajmera and Watlington)
- International Association of Fire Fighters Local 660 (co-endorsement with Ajmera and Watlington)
- Service Employees International Union, Local 32BJ (co-endorsement with Ajmera and Watlington)
- UNITE HERE Local 23 (co-endorsement with Ajmera and Watlington)

Organizations

- Black Political Caucus of Charlotte-Mecklenburg (Democratic primary only, co-endorsement with Ajmera, Mitchell, and Watlington)
- Everytown for Gun Safety (co-endorsement with Ajmera and Watlington)
- LGBTQ+ Democrats of Mecklenburg County (co-endorsement with Ajmera, Mitchell, and Yadav)
- LGBTQ+ Victory Fund

Newspapers

- The Charlotte Observer (Democratic primary only, co-endorsement with Ajmera, Mitchell, and Watlington)
Victoria Watlington

Labor unions

- Charlotte-Metrolina Labor Council (co-endorsement with Ajmera and Slack-Mayfield)
- International Association of Fire Fighters Local 660 (co-endorsement with Ajmera and Slack-Mayfield)
- Service Employees International Union, Local 32BJ (co-endorsement with Ajmera and Slack-Mayfield)
- UNITE HERE Local 23 (co-endorsement with Ajmera and Slack-Mayfield)

Organizations

- Black Political Caucus of Charlotte-Mecklenburg (Democratic primary only, co-endorsement with Ajmera, Mitchell, and Slack-Mayfield)
- Charlotte-Mecklenburg Fraternal Order of Police (co-endorsement with Ajmera, Britt, and Yadav)
- Everytown for Gun Safety (co-endorsement with Ajmera and Slack-Mayfield)

Newspapers

- The Charlotte Observer (Democratic primary only, co-endorsement with Ajmera, Mitchell, and Slack-Mayfield)
Namrata (N.Y.) Yadav

City councilors

- Julie Eiselt, former at-large council member (2015–2022)

Individuals

- Hugh McColl, former CEO of Bank of America (co-endorsement with Ajmera)

Organizations

- Charlotte-Mecklenburg Fraternal Order of Police (co-endorsement with Ajmera, Britt, and Watlington)
- LGBTQ+ Democrats of Mecklenburg County (co-endorsement with Ajmera, Mitchell, and Slack-Mayfield)

==== Forums ====
Democratic primary candidate forums
No.	Date	Host	Moderator	Link	Participants									
Key: P Participant A Absent W Withdrawn														
Key: P Participant A Absent W Withdrawn					Ajmera	Britt	Davis	Holley	Lockhart	Mitchell	Slack-Mayfield	Stoldt	Watlington	Yadav
1	July 22, 2025	Sarah Stevenson; Tuesday Forum	Jackie Edwards Walton; Mary Johnson		P	A	A	P	P	A	P	A	P	P
2	August 19, 2025	WFAE	Steve Harrison		P	P	A	P	P	P	P	W	P	P
3	August 26, 2025	The Charlotte Ledger	Tony Merica		P	P	A	A	P	P	P	W	P	P
4	September 2, 2025	Sarah Stevenson; Tuesday Forum	Winston Robinson		A	P	A	A	A	A	A	W	A	A

==== Fundraising ====
Campaign finance reports as of August 26, 2025
Candidate	Raised	Spent	Cash on hand
Dimple Ajmera (D)	$54,475	$31,601	$167,021
Matt Britt (D)	$27,693 (Note: $20,000 of this total was self-funded by Britt)	$11,682	$16,010
Will Holley (D)	$1,943 (Note: $1,001 of this total was self-funded by Holley)	$1,805	$356
J. G. Lockhart (D)	$1,450 (Note: $150 of this total was self-funded by Lockhart)	$1,075	$375
Smuggie Mitchell (D)	$12,085	$3,742	$8,343
LaWana Slack-Mayfield (D)	$17,265	$15,912	$19,491
Victoria Watlington (D)	$7,265	$5,275	$31,527
N.Y. Yadav (D)	$21,985	$15,701	$6,284
Source: Mecklenburg County Board of Elections

==== Results ====
Precinct results by top vote-getter: Ajmera Slack-Mayfield Mitchell Watlington Yadav Tie: Ajmera–Watlington

Democratic primary results
Party	Candidate	Votes	%
Democratic	Dimple Ajmera	30,435	20.78%
Democratic	LaWana Slack-Mayfield	25,612	17.49%
Democratic	James (Smuggie) Mitchell, Jr.	23,624	16.13%
Democratic	Victoria Watlington	22,849	15.60%
Democratic	Namrata (N.Y.) Yadav	13,102	8.95%
Democratic	Matt Britt	8,701	5.94%
Democratic	Roderick Davis	7,382	5.04%
Democratic	Will Holley	6,726	4.59%
Democratic	J. G. Lockhart	5,721	3.91%
Democratic	Emerson Stoldt (withdrawn)	2,314	1.58%
Total votes		146,466	100.00%

=== Republican primary ===
==== Nominees ====
- Misun Kim, realtor and nominee for mayor in 2023
- Edwin Peacock III, incumbent council member from the 6th district (2025–present) (Note: Peacock previously represented at-large (2007–2011).) and nominee for mayor in 2013 and 2015

==== Fundraising ====
Campaign finance reports as of August 26, 2025
Candidate	Raised	Spent	Cash on hand
Edwin Peacock III (R)	$31,337	$385	$30,952
Source: Mecklenburg County Board of Elections

=== General election ===
==== Post-primary endorsements ====
Dimple Ajmera (D)

Labor unions

- United Auto Workers (co-endorsement with Slack-Mayfield and Watlington)

Organizations

- Black Political Caucus of Charlotte-Mecklenburg (co-endorsement with Mitchell, Slack-Mayfield, and Watlington)
- CAIR Action (co-endorsement with Slack-Mayfield and Watlington)
- Equality North Carolina PAC (co-endorsement with Mitchell, Slack-Mayfield, and Watlington)
- New North Carolina Project Action First (co-endorsement with Mitchell, Slack-Mayfield, and Watlington)
- Sierra Club North Carolina

Newspapers

- The Charlotte Observer (co-endorsement with Peacock, Slack-Mayfield, and Watlington)
- The Charlotte Post (co-endorsement with Mitchell, Peacock, and Slack-Mayfield)
James (Smuggie) Mitchell Jr. (D)

Organizations

- Black Political Caucus of Charlotte-Mecklenburg (co-endorsement with Ajmera, Slack-Mayfield, and Watlington)
- Equality North Carolina PAC (co-endorsement with Ajmera, Slack-Mayfield, and Watlington)
- New North Carolina Project Action First (co-endorsement with Ajmera, Slack-Mayfield, and Watlington)

Newspapers

- The Charlotte Post (co-endorsement with Ajmera, Peacock, and Slack-Mayfield)
LaWana Slack-Mayfield (D)

Labor unions

- United Auto Workers (co-endorsement with Ajmera and Watlington)

Organizations

- Black Political Caucus of Charlotte-Mecklenburg (co-endorsement with Ajmera, Mitchell, and Watlington)
- CAIR Action (co-endorsement with Ajmera and Watlington)
- Equality North Carolina PAC (co-endorsement with Ajmera, Mitchell, and Watlington)
- LPAC
- Red Wine & Blue
- New North Carolina Project Action First (co-endorsement with Ajmera, Mitchell, and Watlington)

Newspapers

- The Charlotte Observer (co-endorsement with Ajmera, Peacock, and Watlington)
- The Charlotte Post (co-endorsement with Ajmera, Mitchell, and Peacock)
Victoria Watlington (D)

Labor unions

- United Auto Workers (co-endorsement with Ajmera and Slack-Mayfield)

Organizations

- 314 Action
- Black Political Caucus of Charlotte-Mecklenburg (co-endorsement with Mitchell, Slack-Mayfield, and Slack-Mayfield)
- CAIR Action (co-endorsement with Ajmera and Slack-Mayfield)
- Equality North Carolina PAC (co-endorsement with Ajmera, Mitchell, and Slack-Mayfield)
- New North Carolina Project Action First (co-endorsement with Ajmera, Mitchell, and Slack-Mayfield)

Newspapers

- The Charlotte Observer (co-endorsement with Ajmera, Peacock, and Slack-Mayfield)
Edwin Peacock III (R)

Newspapers

- The Charlotte Observer (co-endorsement with Ajmera, Slack-Mayfield, and Watlington)
- The Charlotte Post (co-endorsement with Ajmera, Mitchell, and Slack-Mayfield)

==== Forums ====
2025 Charlotte's at-large City Council candidate forums
No.	Date	Host	Moderator	Link	Participants					
Key: P Participant A Absent W Withdrawn										
Key: P Participant A Absent W Withdrawn					Ajmera	Mitchell	Slack-Mayfield	Watlington	Kim	Peacock
1	October 14, 2025	Sarah Stevenson; Tuesday Forum	Winston Robinson		A	P	P	P	P	A
2	October 23, 2025	The Charlotte Ledger	Glenn Burkins; Tony Mercia		P	A	A	A	P	P

==== Fundraising ====
Campaign finance reports as of October 20, 2025
Candidate	Raised	Spent	Cash on hand
Dimple Ajmera (D)	$76,350	$40,783	$179,714
Smuggie Mitchell (D)	$31,282	$21,927	$9,355
LaWana Slack-Mayfield (D)	$34,485	$35,675	$16,948
Victoria Watlington (D)	$21,635	$8,731	$42,441
Edwin Peacock III (R)	$144,555	$26,738	$117,817
Source: Mecklenburg County Board of Elections

==== Results ====
2025 Charlotte's at-large City Council election results
Party	Candidate	Votes	%
Democratic	Dimple Ajmera	96,599	21.07%
Democratic	Victoria Watlington	95,212	20.77%
Democratic	James (Smuggie) Mitchell, Jr.	90,177	19.67%
Democratic	LaWana Slack-Mayfield	87,866	19.17%
Republican	Edwin Peacock III	46,190	10.17%
Republican	Misun Kim	36,564	7.98%
Write-in		5,863	1.28%
Total votes		458,471	100.00%

== District 1 ==
2025 Charlotte's 1st City Council district election
- November 4, 2025

Nominee	Danté Anderson	Write-ins
Party	Democratic
Popular vote	17,607	498
Percentage	97.25%	2.75%
- Anderson: ≥90%
Council member before election
Danté Anderson
Democratic
Elected Council member
Danté Anderson
Democratic

The 1st district included the neighborhoods of Chantilly, Cherry, Derita, Dilworth, Elizabeth, Freedom Park, Grier Heights, Madison Park, NoDa, Plaza Midwood, Sedgefield, and the First and Second Ward of Uptown Charlotte, among others. The incumbent was Democrat Danté Anderson, who had represented the district since 2022 and was re-elected with 97.9% of the vote in 2023.

=== Democratic primary ===
==== Nominee ====
- Danté Anderson, incumbent council member

==== Eliminated in primary ====
- Charlene Henderson El, cosmetologist and perennial candidate

==== Endorsements ====
Danté Anderson

Organizations

- Black Political Caucus of Charlotte-Mecklenburg (Democratic primary only)
- LGBTQ+ Democrats of Mecklenburg County

Newspapers

- The Charlotte Observer (Democratic primary only)
Charlene Henderson El

Organizations

- Democratic Men of Mecklenburg County

==== Forums ====
Democratic primary candidate forums
No.	Date	Host	Moderator	Link	Participants	
Key: P Participant A Absent W Withdrawn						
Key: P Participant A Absent W Withdrawn					Anderson	El
1	August 5, 2025	Sarah Stevenson; Tuesday Forum	Winston Robinson		P	P
2	August 19, 2025	WFAE	Steve Harrison		P	P
3	August 26, 2025	The Charlotte Ledger	Tony Mercia		P	P

==== Fundraising ====
Campaign finance reports as of August 26, 2025
Candidate	Raised	Spent	Cash on hand
Danté Anderson (D)	$33,122	$5,315	$49,638
Charlene Henderson El (D)	$6,301	$3,591	$2,710
Source: Mecklenburg County Board of Elections

==== Results ====
Precinct results: Anderson: 50–60%; 60–70%; 70–80%; 80–90%; El: 50–60%; 60–70%

Democratic primary results
Party	Candidate	Votes	%
Democratic	Danté Anderson	4,731	68.62%
Democratic	Charlene Henderson El	2,163	31.38%
Total votes		6,894	100.00%

=== General election ===
==== Post-primary endorsements ====
Danté Anderson (D)

Organizations

- Black Political Caucus of Charlotte-Mecklenburg
- LPAC

==== Results ====
2025 Charlotte's 1st City Council district election results
Party	Candidate	Votes	%
Democratic	Danté Anderson	17,607	97.25%
Write-in		498	2.75%
Total votes		18,105	100.00%

== District 2 ==
2025 Charlotte's 2nd City Council district election
- November 4, 2025
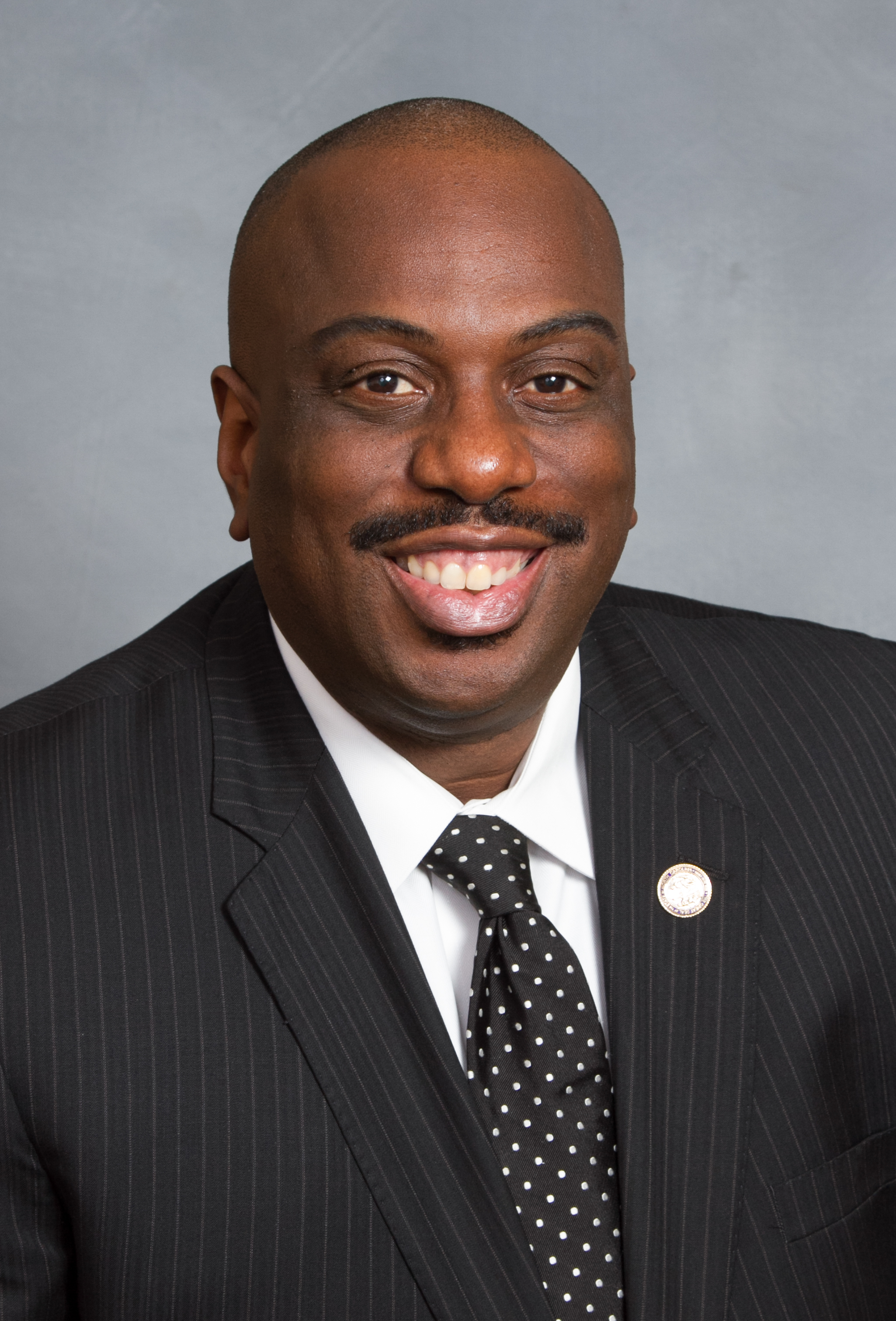

Nominee	Malcolm Graham	Lia White (Write-in)
Party	Democratic	Independent
Popular vote	13,530	629
Percentage	92.84%	4.32%
- Graham: 80–90% ≥90%
Council member before election
Malcolm Graham
Democratic
Elected Council member
Malcolm Graham
Democratic

The 2nd district included the neighborhoods of Biddleville, Coulwood, Paw Creek, and the Third and Fourth Ward of Uptown Charlotte, among others. The incumbent was Democrat Malcolm Graham, who had represented the district since 2019 and was re-elected with 97.7% of the vote in 2023.

=== Democratic primary ===
==== Nominee ====
- Malcolm Graham, incumbent council member

==== Endorsements ====
Malcolm Graham

Organizations

- Black Political Caucus of Charlotte-Mecklenburg (Democratic primary only)

==== Fundraising ====
Campaign finance reports as of July 25, 2025
Candidate	Raised	Spent	Cash on hand
Malcolm Graham (D)	$19,648	$12,921	$24,297
Source: Mecklenburg County Board of Elections

=== Write-in candidate ===
- Lia White, educator (Independent)

=== General elections ===
==== Post-primary endorsements ====
Malcolm Graham (D)

Organizations

- Black Political Caucus of Charlotte-Mecklenburg
- Equality North Carolina PAC

==== Fundraising ====
Campaign finance reports as of October 20, 2025
Candidate	Raised	Spent	Cash on hand
Malcolm Graham (D)	$2,300	$5,890	$10,652
Source: Mecklenburg County Board of Elections

==== Results ====
2025 Charlotte's 2nd City Council district election results
Party	Candidate	Votes	%
Democratic	Malcolm Graham	13,530	92.84%
Write-In	Lia White	629	4.32%
Write-in		414	2.84%
Total votes		14,573	100.00%

== District 3 ==
2025 Charlotte's 3rd City Council district election
- November 4, 2025

Nominee	Joi Mayo	James Bowers	Robin Emmons
Party	Democratic	Republican	Independent
Popular vote	10,050	2,224	1,387
Percentage	73.51%	16.27%	10.15%
- Mayo: 50–60% 60–70% 70–80% 80–90% Bowers: 50–60% No votes
Council member before election
Tiawana Brown
Democratic
Elected Council member
Joi Mayo
Democratic

The 3rd district included the neighborhoods of Clanton Park, Reid Park, South End, Steele Creek, and York Road, among others. The incumbent was Democrat Tiawana Brown, who had represented the district since 2023 and was elected with 78.6% of the vote in 2023.

=== Background ===
In 1993, Brown was indicted on charges related to Social Security fraud. After pleading guilty, she was sentenced to 33 months in prison at FPC Alderson, beginning in 1994. She was released early but later violated her parole. After facing two charges in Mecklenburg County relating to check fraud, she went back to prison and was released in 1998.

Upon her election in 2023, Brown became the first formerly incarcerated person elected to the City Council. In May 2025, Brown was indicted by the Western District of North Carolina for allegedly securing $124,000 in fraudent loans during the COVID-19 pandemic. In January 2026, Brown pleaded guilty to one count of wire fraud conspiracy.

=== Democratic primary ===
==== Nominee ====
- Joi Mayo, community advocate

==== Eliminated in primary ====
- Tiawana Brown, incumbent council member
- Warren Turner, former council member for this district (2003–2011)

==== Withdrawn ====
- Montravias King, former Elizabeth City councilman (2013–2015) (remained on ballot, endorsed Brown)

==== Endorsements ====
Tiawana Brown

Local officials

- Montravias King, former Elizabeth City councilman (2013–2015) and former candidate for this district

Labor unions

- Service Employees International Union, Local 32BJ
- UNITE HERE Local 23
Montravias King (withdrawn)

Organizations

- Everytown for Gun Safety
- Run for Something
Joi Mayo

Organizations

- Black Political Caucus of Charlotte-Mecklenburg (Democratic primary only)
- Charlotte-Mecklenburg Fraternal Order of Police
- LGBTQ+ Democrats of Mecklenburg County

Newspapers

- The Charlotte Observer (Democratic primary only)

==== Forums ====
Democratic primary candidate forums
No.	Date	Host	Moderator	Link	Participants			
Key: P Participant A Absent W Withdrawn								
Key: P Participant A Absent W Withdrawn					Brown	King	Mayo	Turner
1	August 12, 2025	Sarah Stevenson; Tuesday Forum	Mary Johnson		P	P (Note: King withdrew from the race and endorsed Brown during the forum, citing the Black Political Caucus of Charlotte-Mecklenburg's endorsement of Mayo, which was announced earlier that morning.)	P	P
2	August 19, 2025	WFAE	Steve Harrison		A	W	P	P
3	August 26, 2025	The Charlotte Ledger	Tony Mercia		P	W	P	P

==== Fundraising ====
Campaign finance reports as of August 26, 2025
Candidate	Raised	Spent	Cash on hand
Tiawana Brown (D)	$7,210	$3,822	$3,388
Joi Mayo (D)	$17,270	$7,661	$10,916
Warren Turner (D)	$13,234 (Note: $1,034 of this total was self-funded by Turner)	$5,264	$11,538
Source: Mecklenburg County Board of Elections

==== Results ====
Precinct results: Mayo: 40–50%; 50–60%; 60–70%; Brown: 30–40%; 40–50%; Turner: 30–40%; 40–50%; No votes

Democratic primary results
Party	Candidate	Votes	%
Democratic	Joi Mayo	2,409	49.47%
Democratic	Tiawana Brown	1,223	25.11%
Democratic	Warren Turner	1,071	21.99%
Democratic	Montravias King	167	3.43%
Total votes		4,870	100.00%

=== Republican primary ===
==== Nominee ====
- James Bowers, minister and nominee for this district in 2022 and 2023

==== Fundraising ====
Campaign finance reports as of August 26, 2025
Candidate	Raised	Spent	Cash on hand
James Bowers (R)	$1,499	$619	$880
Source: Mecklenburg County Board of Elections

=== Independent candidate ===
- Robin Emmons, hunger activist

=== General elections ===
==== Post-primary endorsements ====
Joi Mayo (D)

Organizations

- Black Political Caucus of Charlotte-Mecklenburg
- CAIR Action
- New North Carolina Project Action First
- Sierra Club North Carolina

Newspapers

- The Charlotte Observer
- The Charlotte Post

==== Forums ====
2025 Charlotte's 3rd City Council district candidate forums
No.	Date	Host	Moderator	Link	Participants		
Key: P Participant A Absent W Withdrawn							
Key: P Participant A Absent W Withdrawn					Mayo	Bowers	Emmons
1	October 21, 2025	Sarah Stevenson; Tuesday Forum	Mary Johnson		P	A	P
2	October 23, 2025	The Charlotte Ledger	Glenn Burkins; Tony Mercia		P	A	A

==== Fundraising ====
Campaign finance reports as of October 20, 2025
Candidate	Raised	Spent	Cash on hand
Joi Mayo (D)	$26,707	$21,409	$6,605
Robin Emmons (I)	$7,410	$3,332	$4,078
Source: Mecklenburg County Board of Elections

==== Results ====
2025 Charlotte's 3rd City Council district election results
Party	Candidate	Votes	%
Democratic	Joi Mayo	10,050	73.51%
Republican	James Bowers	2,224	16.27%
Independent	Robin Emmmons	1,387	10.15%
Write-in		10	0.07%
Total votes		13,661	100.00%

== District 4 ==
2025 Charlotte's 4th City Council district election
- November 4, 2025

Nominee	Reneé Perkins Johnson	Write-ins
Party	Democratic
Popular vote	14,522	284
Percentage	98.08%	1.92%
- Johnson: ≥90%
Council member before election
Reneé Perkins Johnson
Democratic
Elected Council member
Reneé Perkins Johnson
Democratic

The 4th district included the neighborhoods of Highland Creek and University City, among others. The incumbent was Democrat Reneé Perkins Johnson who had represented the district since 2019 and was re-elected with 97.9% of the vote in 2023.

=== Democratic primary ===
==== Nominee ====
- Reneé Perkins Johnson, incumbent council member

==== Eliminated in primary ====
- Wil Russell, construction manager and candidate for this district in 2023

==== Endorsements ====
Reneé Perkins Johnson

Labor unions

- Charlotte-Metrolina Labor Council
- Service Employees International Union, Local 32BJ
- International Association of Fire Fighters Local 660
- UNITE HERE Local 23

Organizations

- Black Political Caucus of Charlotte-Mecklenburg (Democratic primary only)
- Charlotte-Mecklenburg Fraternal Order of Police

Newspapers

- The Charlotte Observer (Democratic primary only)
Wil Russell

Organizations

- LGBTQ+ Democrats of Mecklenburg County

==== Forums ====
Democratic primary candidate forums
No.	Date	Host	Moderator	Link	Participants	
Key: P Participant A Absent W Withdrawn						
Key: P Participant A Absent W Withdrawn					Johnson	Russell
1	August 19, 2025	Sarah Stevenson; Tuesday Forum	Laura McClettie		P	P
2	August 19, 2025	WFAE	Steve Harrison		P	P
3	August 26, 2025	The Charlotte Ledger	Tony Merica		P	A

==== Fundraising ====
Campaign finance reports as of August 26, 2025
Candidate	Raised	Spent	Cash on hand
Reneé Perkins Johnson (D)	$10,698	$8,510	$3,251
Wil Russell (D)	$21,685	$12,275	$12,733
Source: Mecklenburg County Board of Elections

==== Results ====
Precinct results: Johnson: 50–60%; 60–70%; 70–80%

Democratic primary results
Party	Candidate	Votes	%
Democratic	Reneé Perkins Johnson	4,197	67.87%
Democratic	Wil Russell	1,987	32.13%
Total votes		6,184	100.00%

=== General elections ===
==== Post-primary endorsements ====
Reneé Perkins Johnson (D)

Labor unions

- United Auto Workers

Organizations

- Black Political Caucus of Charlotte-Mecklenburg
- Red Wine & Blue

==== Fundraising ====
Campaign finance reports as of October 20, 2025
Candidate	Raised	Spent	Cash on hand
Reneé Perkins Johnson (D)	$27,833	$28,047	$849
Source: Mecklenburg County Board of Elections

==== Results ====
2025 Charlotte's 4th City Council district election results
Party	Candidate	Votes	%
Democratic	Reneé Perkins Johnson	14,522	98.08%
Write-in		284	1.92%
Total votes		14,806	100.00%

== District 5 ==
2025 Charlotte's 5th City Council district election
- November 4, 2025

Nominee	JD Mazuera Arias	Write-ins
Party	Democratic
Popular vote	12,753	345
Percentage	97.37%	2.63%
- Mazuera Arias: ≥90% No votes
Council member before election
Marjorie Molina
Democratic
Elected Council member
JD Mazuera Arias
Democratic

The 5th district included the neighborhoods of Cotswold, East Forest, Eastland, and Sherwood Forest, among others. The incumbent was Democrat Marjorie Molina who had represented the district since 2022 and was re-elected with 98.1% of the vote in 2023.

=== Democratic primary ===
==== Nominee ====
- JD Mazuera Arias, chair of the Hispanic American Democrats of Mecklenburg County (2025–present)

==== Eliminated in primary ====
- Marjorie Molina, incumbent council member

==== Endorsements ====
JD Mazuera Arias

State legislators

- Jordan Lopez, state representative from the 112th district (2025–present)

Local officials

- Jennifer Roberts, former mayor of Charlotte (2015–2017)

Labor unions

- Charlotte-Metrolina Labor Council
- Service Employees International Union, Local 32BJ

Organizations

- Everytown for Gun Safety
- FFRF Action Fund
- LGBTQ+ Democrats of Mecklenburg County (co-endorsement with Molina)
- LGBTQ+ Victory Fund
- Run for Something

Newspapers

- The Charlotte Observer (Democratic primary only)
Marjorie Molina

Organizations

- Black Political Caucus of Charlotte-Mecklenburg (Democratic primary only)
- LGBTQ+ Democrats of Mecklenburg County (co-endorsement with Mazuera Arias)

==== Forums ====
Democratic primary candidate forums
No.	Date	Host	Moderator	Link	Participants	
Key: P Participant A Absent W Withdrawn						
Key: P Participant A Absent W Withdrawn					Mazuera Arias	Molina
1	August 19, 2025	WFAE	Steve Harrison		P	P
2	August 26, 2025	Sarah Stevenson; Tuesday Forum	Jackie Edwards Walton		P	P
3	August 26, 2025	The Charlotte Ledger	Tony Merica		P	P

==== Fundraising ====
Campaign finance reports as of August 26, 2025
Candidate	Raised	Spent	Cash on hand
JD Mazuera Arias (D)	$31,308 (Note: $100 of this total was self-funded by Mazuera Arias.)	$11,820	$20,985
Source: Mecklenburg County Board of Elections

==== Results ====
Precinct results: Mazuera Arias: 50–60%; 60–70%; 70–80%; 80–90%; Molina: 50–60%; 60–70%; ≥90%

Democratic primary results
Party	Candidate	Votes	%
Democratic	JD Mazuera Arias	3,020	50.28%
Democratic	Marjorie Molina	2,986	49.72%
Total votes		6,006	100.00%

=== General election ===
==== Post-primary endorsements ====
JD Mazuera Arias (D)

Labor unions

- United Auto Workers

Organizations

- Black Political Caucus of Charlotte-Mecklenburg
- Equality North Carolina PAC

==== Fundraising ====
Campaign finance reports as of October 20, 2025
Candidate	Raised	Spent	Cash on hand
JD Mazuera Arias (D)	$36,535	$27,967	$8,567
Source: Mecklenburg County Board of Elections

==== Results ====
2025 Charlotte's 5th City Council district election results
Party	Candidate	Votes	%
Democratic	JD Mazuera Arias	12,753	97.37%
Write-in		345	2.63%
Total votes		13,098	100.00%

== District 6 ==
2025 Charlotte's 6th City Council district election
- November 4, 2025

Nominee	Kimberly Ownes	Krista Bokhari
Party	Democratic	Republican
Popular vote	16,268	12,510
Percentage	56.46%	43.42%
- Owens: 50–60% 60–70% 70–80% 80–90% ≥90% Bokhari: 50–60% 60–70%
Council member before election
Edwin Peacock III (Note: In May 2025, Peacock was appointed by the Charlotte City Council fill the vacancy caused by the resignation of council member Tariq Bokhari, who had become Deputy Administrator of the Federal Transit Administration.)
Republican
Elected Council member
Kimberly Owens
Democratic

The 6th district included the neighborhoods of Eastover, Myers Park, Parkdale, Quail Hollow, Starmount, SouthPark, and Stonehaven, among others.

The previous incumbent, Republican Tariq Bokhari, had represented the district since 2017 and was re-elected with 50.7% of the vote in 2023. Bokhari resigned on April 20, 2025, to become Deputy Administrator of the Federal Transit Administration. Per North Carolina law, Bokhari's replacement had to be a Republican.

On May 19, the Charlotte City Council voted to appoint Republican Edwin Peacock III to fill the remainder of Bokhari's term. Peacock previously represented at-large from 2007 to 2011. On July 17, Peacock announced his intent to run for an at-large seat.

=== Appointment ===
==== Interim appointee ====
- Edwin Peacock III, former at-large council member (2007–2011)

==== Eliminated in appointment vote ====
- Krista Bokhari, nominee for North Carolina's 104th House district in 2024 and wife of outgoing council member Tariq Bokhari

==== Applied to be appointed ====
- Sary Chakra, realtor
- Andy Dulin, former state representative from the 104th district (2017–2019)
- Andrew Dunn, journalist
- David Jewell, marketing executive
- Christopher McBride
- Douglas Paris
- La Reshia Poore, social worker
- James Rice, realtor

==== Disqualified from being appointed ====
- Grayson Sandlin, college student (lived outside district boundaries)
- Asherdee Welby, domestic violent advocate (Independent)

==== Endorsements ====
Krista Bokhari (R)

U.S. representatives

- Tim Moore, U.S. representative from North Carolina's 14th congressional district (2025–present)

State legislators

- Tricia Cotham, state representative from the 105th district (2007–2017, 2023–present)
- Destin Hall, Speaker of the State House (2025–present) from the 87th district (2017–present)
- Vickie Sawyer, state senator from the 37th district (2018–present)

Local officials

- Tariq Bokhari, city council member from the 6th district (2017–2025) (candidate's husband)

Political parties

- Mecklenburg County Republican Party

==== Forum ====
2025 Charlotte's 6th City Council district appointment public forum
No.	Date	Host	Moderator	Link	Participants									
Key: P Participant A Absent W Withdrawn														
Key: P Participant A Absent W Withdrawn					Bokhari	Chakra	Dulin	Dunn	Jewell	McBride	Paris	Peacock	Poore	Rice
1	May 15, 2025	Charlotte City Council	Vi Lyles		A	P	P	A	A	A	A	P	P	P

==== Appointment vote ====
Vote by member: Peacock: Democratic member; Bokhari: Democratic member; Republican member; Vacant

Candidate	Votes	Percent
Edwin Peacock III ✓	6 (Note: Peacock received votes from Anderson, Graham, Mitchell, Molina, and Slack-Mayfield. Lyles cast the tie-breaking vote for Peacock.)	54.5%
Krista Bokhari	5 (Note: Bokhari received votes from Ajmera, Brown, Driggs, Johnson, and Watlington.)	45.5%

=== Republican primary ===
==== Nominee ====
- Krista Bokhari, nominee for North Carolina's 104th House district in 2024, and wife of outgoing council member Tariq Bokhari

==== Eliminated in primary ====
- Sary Chakra, realtor

==== Declined ====
- Edwin Peacock III, incumbent council member (running in at-large seat)

==== Endorsements ====
Krista Bokhari

Labor unions

- International Association of Fire Fighters Local 660

Organizations

- Charlotte-Mecklenburg Fraternal Order of Police

Newspapers

- The Charlotte Observer (Republican primary only)

==== Forums ====
Republican primary candidate forums
No.	Date	Host	Moderator	Link	Participants	
Key: P Participant A Absent W Withdrawn						
Key: P Participant A Absent W Withdrawn					Bokhari	Chakra
1	August 19, 2025	WFAE	Steve Harrison		P	P
2	August 26, 2025	The Charlotte Ledger	Tony Merica		P	P

==== Fundraising ====
Campaign finance reports as of August 26, 2025
Candidate	Raised	Spent	Cash on hand
Krista Bokhari (R)	$61,435	$6,925	$54,510
Sary Chakra (R)	$20,077	$13,123	$6,954
Source: Mecklenburg County Board of Elections

==== Results ====
Precinct results: Bokhari: 50–60%; 60–70%; 70–80%; 80–90%; Chakra: 60–70%

Republican primary results
Party	Candidate	Votes	%
Republican	Krista Bokhari	2,409	76.07%
Republican	Sary Chakra	758	23.93%
Total votes		3,167	100.00%

=== Democratic primary ===
==== Nominee ====
- Kimberly Owens, attorney

==== Endorsements ====
Kimberly Owens

Local officials

- Christy Clark, mayor of Huntersville (2023–present)

Individuals

- Hugh McColl, former CEO of Bank of America

Labor unions

- UNITE HERE Local 23

Organizations

- Black Political Caucus of Charlotte-Mecklenburg (Democratic primary only)
- Everytown for Gun Safety
- LGBTQ+ Democrats of Mecklenburg County

==== Fundraising ====
Campaign finance reports as of August 26, 2025
Candidate	Raised	Spent	Cash on hand
Kimberly Owens (D)	$46,710 (Note: $2,000 of this total was self-funded by Owens.)	$31,868	$14,843
Source: Mecklenburg County Board of Elections

=== General election ===
==== Post-primary endorsements ====
Krista Bokhari

Newspapers

- The Charlotte Observer
Kimberly Owens (D)

State legislators

- Woodson Bradley, state senator from the 42nd district (2025–present)

Organizations

- Black Political Caucus of Charlotte-Mecklenburg
- Equality North Carolina PAC
- Red Wine & Blue
- Sierra Club North Carolina

Newspapers

- The Charlotte Post

==== Forums ====
2025 Charlotte's 6th City Council district candidate forums
No.	Date	Host	Moderator	Link	Participants	
Key: P Participant A Absent W Withdrawn						
Key: P Participant A Absent W Withdrawn					Bokhari	Owens
1	October 23, 2025	The Charlotte Ledger	Glenn Burkins; Tony Mercia		P	P
2	October 28, 2025	Sarah Stevenson; Tuesday Forum	Laura McClettie		A	P

==== Fundraising ====
Campaign finance reports as of October 20, 2025
Candidate	Raised	Spent	Cash on hand
Krista Bokhari (R)	$157,053	$71,776	$85,277
Kimberly Owens (D)	$86,747 (Note: $2,000 of this total was self-funded by Owens.)	$70,980	$15,768
Source: Mecklenburg County Board of Elections

==== Results ====
2025 Charlotte's 6th City Council district election results
Party	Candidate	Votes	%
Democratic	Kimberly Owens	16,268	56.46%
Republican	Krista Bokhari	12,510	43.42%
Write-in		34	0.12%
Total votes		28,812	100.00%

== District 7 ==
2025 Charlotte's 7th City Council district election
- November 4, 2025
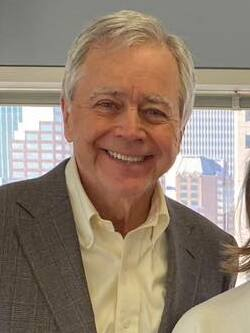

Nominee	Ed Driggs	Write-ins
Party	Republican
Popular vote	13,863	2,678
Percentage	83.81%	16.19%
- Driggs: 70–80% 80–90%
Council member before election
Ed Driggs
Republican
Elected Council member
Ed Driggs
Republican

The 7th district included the neighborhood of Ballantyne, among others. The incumbent is Republican Ed Driggs who had represented the district since 2013 and was re-elected with 84.9% of the vote in 2023.

=== Republican primary ===
==== Nominee ====
- Ed Driggs, incumbent council member

==== Endorsements ====
Declined to endorse

Organizations

- Black Political Caucus of Charlotte-Mecklenburg

==== Fundraising ====
Campaign finance reports as of August 26, 2025
Candidate	Raised	Spent	Cash on hand
Ed Driggs (R)	$23,275	$22,246	$32,520
Source: Mecklenburg County Board of Elections

=== General election ===
==== Fundraising ====
Campaign finance reports as of October 20, 2025
Candidate	Raised	Spent	Cash on hand
Ed Driggs (R)	$32,125	$27,644	$35,973
Source: Mecklenburg County Board of Elections

==== Results ====
2025 Charlotte's 7th City Council district election results
Party	Candidate	Votes	%
Republican	Ed Driggs	13,863	83.81%
Write-in		2,678	16.19%
Total votes		16,541	100.00%

== Mayor Pro Tem election ==
An election for Mayor Pro Tem of the Charlotte City Council took place on December 1, 2025, on the opening day of the 2025–2027 Council. Traditionally, the council awards the title to the at-large member who received the most votes in the preceding election, which was Dimple Ajmera in the 2025 elections. However, the council has not followed this tradition since the 2019 elections.

=== First ballot ===
First ballot vote by member: Aye: Democratic member; Nay: Republican member; Democratic member

JD Mazuera Arias made a motion to elect Dimple Ajmera as Mayor Pro Tem. The motion failed in a four-to-seven vote.

Candidate	Votes	Percent
Aye	4 (Note: Ajmera, Johnson, Mayo, and Mazuera Arias supported the motion to elect Ajmera as Mayor Pro Tem.)	36.4%
Nay ✗	7 (Note: Anderson, Driggs, Graham, Mitchell, Owens, Slack-Mayfield, and Watlington opposed the motion to elect Ajmera as Mayor Pro Tem.)	63.6%

=== Second ballot ===
Second ballot vote by member: Aye: Democratic member; Republican member; Nay: Democratic member

LaWana Slack-Mayfield made a subsequent motion to elect Smuggie Mitchell as Mayor Pro Tem. The motion passed in an eight-to-three vote.

Candidate	Votes	Percent
Aye ✓	8 (Note: Anderson, Driggs, Graham, Johnson, Mazuera Arias, Mitchell, Slack-Mayfield, and Watlington supported the motion to elect Mitchell as Mayor Pro Tem.)	72.7%
Nay	3 (Note: Ajmera, Mayo, and Owens opposed the motion to elect Mitchell as Mayor Pro Tem.)	27.3%

== See also ==
- 2025 United States local elections
  - 2025 Charlotte mayoral election
- Charlotte City Council
