= List of Charlotte neighborhoods =

The city of Charlotte, has 199 Neighborhood Statistical Areas, as determined by the city's planning division. Below is a partial listing of neighborhoods in the city.

== Center City ==
- Uptown is the central business district bounded by the Bill Lee Freeway, Brookshire Freeway, and John Belk Freeway; it comprises four wards that are delineated by Trade and Tryon streets.
  - First Ward is home of the Charlotte Hornets who play at Spectrum Center, UNC Charlotte Center City Campus, First Ward Park, and a sizable mixed-income housing area.
  - Second Ward, is where both city and county government resides and was where Brooklyn, a historically African-American neighborhood, once existed before mid-twentieth century urban renewal.
  - Third Ward is known as the home of the Carolina Panthers and Charlotte FC, who play at Bank of America Stadium, and of the Charlotte Knights, who play at Truist Field. Romare Bearden Park, Brevard Court, and Latta Arcade are also in this ward.
  - Fourth Ward has sections falling within a registered historic district and is one of the few neighborhoods of single-family homes left within the I-277 loop. It is home to Fourth Ward Park.

== East Charlotte ==
- Coventry Woods is a neighborhood with mature tree-scape and original & generational owners. Includes historic Cohen-Fumero House & Cedarwood Park. Cul-de-Sac full neighborhood with many brick homes; built in the late 60's early 70's. Bounded by North Sharon Amity Road, Coronado Drive, Farmingdale Drive, Stonecrest Drive, Amity Place, Redmann Road. Easy access to Uptown Charlotte via US74/Independence Blvd, Monroe Rd., Central Ave.
- East Forest is an area of East Charlotte bounded by N Sharon Amity Rd, Sardis Rd N, Independence Boulevard (US 74), and Monroe Road.
- Easthaven is bounded by W.T. Harris Blvd, Easthaven Dr., Meadowdale Lane and Dawnwood Dr.
- Eastland is a large portion of eastern Charlotte.
- Grove Park is a spacious park-like neighborhood with lakes and tree-lined streets. It is bordered by W.T. Harris Blvd., Robinson Church Road, and the Ravenwood Community.
- Hickory Grove is an area of East Charlotte along East W.T. Harris Blvd and Hickory Grove Road.
- Hickory Ridge is an area approximately bordered by East W.T. Harris Blvd, Albemarle Road, and Pence/Parkton/Hickory Grove Road.
- Idlewild is a neighborhood bordering Eastland along East W.T. Harris Blvd and Idlewild road.
- Oakhurst is the area surrounding Monroe Rd between Wendover and Sharon Amity Rd.
- Plaza Hills is an area extending from North of Mecklenburg Ave along the Plaza to Matheson Ave.
- Plaza-Midwood is an area east of Uptown and along The Plaza and along Central Ave.
- Ravenwood is a neighborhood with large mature trees that borders the Grove Park neighborhood, Plott Road and Robinson Church Road.
- Reedy Creek is an area of the far north of Mecklenburg County & along Plaza Rd. ext. Cabarrus County
- Shamrock is a neighborhood along Shamrock Road near Plaza-Midwood.
- Sardis Woods is an area of East Charlotte bounded by Sardis Rd, Sardis Rd North and the Crown Point Business Park.
- Sheffield Park is a neighborhood full of history bounded by North Sharon Amity Road, Albemarle Rd. and Central Avenue.
- Sherwood Forest is a neighborhood bounded by North Sharon Amity Road, Randolph Rd. and Sardis Road.
- Stonehaven is an area of East Charlotte bounded by Rama Rd., Sardis Rd. and the McAlpine Greenway.
- Windsor Park is a neighborhood full of history bounded by North Sharon Amity Road, Kilborne Rd. and Central Avenue.

== North Charlotte ==
- Belmont is a former mill village located east of Uptown, bordered by N. Davidson St., Parkwood Ave, 10th Ave, and Hawthorne St.
- College Downs is a John Crosland Co./Ryland developed subdivision of tract-built and customized homes located directly across from UNC Charlotte in the University City/Newell-South district, and bordered by Old Concord Rd. to the east, University City Blvd. (Hwy. 49) to the west, Suther Rd. to the north, and Harris Blvd. to the south. Notably, the homesite of Dr. Bonnie Ethel Cone (1907–2003), late UNC Charlotte founder; Vice-Chancellor Emeritus, and namesake of main thoroughfare Bonnie Ln., is located at Sandburg Ave. & Millay Ave. Streets are named after notable literary figures; e.g., Robert Frost Ln., Lewis Carroll Ct., Van Dyke Dr., et al. With few exceptions, Most homes in this area were constructed btw. 1964 & 1984 & average btw. 1500 sq. ft.-2500+ sq. ft. Lots range btw. .35 acr.-.85+ acr.
- Croft contains the Croft Historic District and is an area located between Statesville Rd, I-485, Browne Rd, West Sugar Creek Rd, and extends just past West WT Harris Blvd to include Griffith Lakes, named after historically prominent local landowner E.C. Griffith. It contains access to Clarks Creek Greenway with connections to Mallard Creek Greenway, Toby Creek Greenway and Barton Creek Greenway, forming one of the largest greenway systems in Mecklenburg County. This system provides access to the Blue Line light rail extensions.
- Derita, centered on the Derita mineral spring, is located north of I-85 along West Sugar Creek Road.
- Hidden Valley is located along Sugar Creek Rd south of I-85, bordered by North Tryon St. along the south and west.
- Graceshire is an area located between Old Statesville Rd, Griffith Lakes, W Sugar Creek Rd, Hubbard Rd, Mallard Creek Rd, Nevin Rd, and Gibbon Road. This area is centered around the Charles Manuel Grace mansion.
- Highland Creek is a planned community West of Concord Mills and I-85, east of Eastfield Road and north of Mallard Creek.
- Lockwood, consisting of residential housing, is to the northeast of the I-277 loop, between North Tryon St. and North Graham St.
- Newell is located along Old Concord Rd.; encompassing Orr Rd. to Rocky River Rd. W., McLean Rd. to Suther Rd., and all points east and west between.
- Nevin is the area surrounding Nevin Regional Park and Ribbonwalk Nature Preserve.
- NoDa, a former mill village previously called North Charlotte, is located along North Davidson Street.
- Northlake is located near the mall of the same name.
- Mallard is the area bordered by I-485, I-85, W Mallard Creek Church Rd, Mallard Creek Rd, Hubbard Rd, West Sugar Creek Rd, and Browne Rd. It contains access to Mallard Creek Greenway and Clarks Creek Greenway with connections to Toby Creek Greenway and Barton Creek Greenway, forming one of the largest greenway systems in Mecklenburg County. This system provides access to the Blue Line light rail extensions.
- Mineral Springs is an area located between by North Graham St, W Sugar Creek Rd, Nevin Rd, Mallard Creek Rd, around the Ridgeview subdivision, Neal Rd, University City Boulevard, and I-85.
- Tryon Hills is area surrounding North Tryon St just northeast of Uptown.
- University City is the portion of Charlotte in the extreme northeast and includes UNC Charlotte, University Research Park, and The Shoppes at University Place. It contains access to Mallard Creek Greenway, Toby Creek Greenway, and Barton Creek Greenway with connections to Clarks Creek Greenway, forming one of the largest greenway networks in Mecklenburg County. This area contains access to the Blue Line light rail extension.
- Villa Heights, a former mill village, now combined with a portion of the former Plaza Hills neighborhood, is bordered by Parkwood Avenue, The Plaza, Matheson Avenue, and North Davidson Street.
- Wilson Heights is the area surrounding the intersection of Statesville Rd and Nevin Rd.

== South Charlotte ==
- Ballantyne is a major commercial office, retail, and residential area, near the NC/SC border, centered on the Ballantyne edge city which includes Ballantyne Corporate Park, Ballantyne Commons, Ballantyne Hotel & Resort, Ballantyne Village, and Toringdon mixed use development (Toringdon Circle, Toringdon Market, etc.) along Johnston Road, Ballantyne Commons Parkway, and North Community House Road.
- Barclay Downs is a mid-twentieth century neighborhood west of Colony Road near the SouthPark Mall
- Beverly Woods is an area of SouthPark enclosed by Sharon Road, Park Road, and Sulkirk Road
- Blakeney is centered on the intersection of Ardrey Kell and Rea roads, located in between the Arboretum and Ballantyne neighborhoods
- Cameron Wood, built on 386 acres that was once the hunting preserve owned by the Belk family and was the largest planned community in Charlotte (until Highland Creek was completed 10 years later)
- Carmel is an area near the intersection of Pineville-Matthews Road and Carmel Road
- Chantilly is a neighborhood along 7th street between Plaza-Midwood and Elizabeth
- Cherry is a historically African-American neighborhood, which also includes the Metropolitan strip mall. It is bounded within Little Sugar Creek, Kenilworth Avenue, John Belk Freeway, East 4th Street, Queens Road, and Henley Place.
- Cotswold is centered on the intersection of Randolph and Sharon Amity roads
- Dilworth is a historic streetcar suburb of largely craftsman-style bungalows located directly south of uptown
- Eastover is an enclave developed by prominent local landowner E.C.Griffith. It is bounded along the southern side of Providence Road; Colville Road, Randolph Road, and Laurel Avenue.
- Elizabeth, located along East 7th Street and Elizabeth Avenue, is a historic streetcar suburb. Located in Elizabeth is Novant Health Presbyterian Medical Center, American Legion Memorial Stadium, Central Piedmont Community College Center Campus, and three parks.
- Governors Square is an area bounded by Fairview Rd, Colony Rd, and Carmel Rd and also holds the first independent private school in Charlotte, Charlotte Country Day School
- Grier Heights is an area bounded by N. Wendover Rd, Monroe Rd. and Randolph Rd.
- Landsdowne is located along Providence Rd between the Intersection of Fairview Road and Sardis Road and the intersection of Rea Road and Alexander Road.
- Madison Park is a residential area located between E Woodlawn Road to the north, Park Road to the east, Chedworth to the south, and South Blvd to the west. It made up of 1950s style homes, many of which have been renovated
- Montclaire is a residential area located between Chedworth to the north, Archdale to the south and South Blvd to the west. Little Sugar Creek borders its eastern side.
- Myers Park is a planned neighborhood from the early 20th century characterized by its curving streets and mature oaks
- Nations Ford is the area of southwestern Charlotte, near Steele Creek
- Parkdale is northeast of Park Road/Tyvola Road intersection, south of Briar Creek
- Piper Glen is a country club community located off Rea Road, and home of TPC Piper Glen Golf Course, designed by Arnold Palmer.
- Quail Hollow, located in between SouthPark and Pineville, is home to the Quail Hollow Championship
- Raeburn is located along Rea Road
- Sedgefield is located immediately south of Dilworth
- South End is a former industrial district directly south of Uptown that has been converted and expanded into an area of mixed-use developments.
- SouthPark is a small edge city centered on the intersection of Sharon Road and Fairview Road. It includes the nearby neighborhoods of Morrocroft, Governors Square, Foxcroft, and Sharon Woods.
- Starmount is a large neighborhood in the South Boulevard area
- York Road is a large neighborhood area with a mix of commercial, industrial, and residential areas; it is bounded within Bill Lee Freeway, Clanton Road, South Boulevard, and Woodlawn Road.

== West Charlotte ==
- Arbor Glen is a neighborhood located along West Blvd. and adjacent to Clanton Park.
- Ashley Park is the area between Ashley Rd, Freedom Dr, and Wilkinson Blvd.
- Berryhill is a neighborhood located in the extreme west bordering Gaston County near the Charlotte-Douglas International Airport and North of the Dixie neighborhood.
- Biddleville, in west Charlotte along Beatties Ford Rd, is a historically African-American neighborhood surrounding Johnson C. Smith University.
- Camp Greene / Historic Camp Greene is the area between Wilkinson Blvd, Freedom Dr, W Morehead St, and Ashley Rd. This includes parts of Ashley Park.
- Clanton Park is located near the intersection of Clanton Rd. and West Blvd. and takes its name from the park named Clanton Park.
- Coulwood is an area bounded by Brookshire Blvd. and Mount Holly Rd.
- Eagle Lake is an area surrounded by Billy Graham Pkwy, I-485, S Tryon St, and West Blvd.
- Enderly Park is located in west Charlotte along Tuckaseegee Road between I-85 and Berryhill Rd.
- Firestone-Garden Park is located along Beatties Ford Rd. in northwest Charlotte on Capps Hill Mine Rd.
- Lincoln Heights is the area surrounding La Salle St. between Statesville Ave and Beaties Ford Rd.
- Mountain Island is located in the extreme northwest along Brookshire Rd, I-485, and Mt. Holly-Huntersville Rd near Mountain Island Lake.
- Northwood Estates / University Park North is located on the west side of I-85 off of Beatties Ford Rd, anchored by Beatties Ford Rd. and Hoskins Rd. Other main streets include Northbrook Dr, Dawnshire Ave, and Northcliff Dr. Other streets are Clearview Dr, Maple Grove Rd, and Banbury Pl. There are cul-de-sacs of Wood Valley, Valley Wood, and Bondale Pl.
- Oakview Terrace is the neighborhood surrounding the Brookshire freeway between Tennessee Ave. and Rozzelles Ferry Rd.
- Oakdale is located along Oakdale Rd.
- Paw Creek is a large neighborhood from the headwaters of Paw Creek (near Fred D. Alexander Blvd) west to the Catawba River.
- Pinecrest is located on Old Steele Creek Rd. between Wilkinson Blvd. and West Blvd. It is home to the Carolina Golf Club.
- Ponderosa-Wingate is located along West Blvd.
- Reid Park is located where Tryon St. and West Blvd meet. Neighborhood is home to Reid Park Elementary School.
- Revolution Park is the area surrounding the intersection of West Blvd and Remount Rd west of Center City.
- Seversville straddles Seversville Park which is part of the Irwin-Stewart Creek Greenway system.
- Shuffletown area surrounds Bellhaven Road and Mt. Holly-Huntersville Rd.
- Steele Creek is one of the largest neighborhoods covering most of southwestern Mecklenburg County.
- Thomasboro-Hoskins is a former mill town in west Charlotte, between Freedom Drive and N Hoskins Rd north of I-85.
- Todd Park is located along Toddville Rd.
- University Park is located near I-85 anchored primarily from Beatties Ford Rd to LaSalle St. Botany St. Montana Dr. Senior Drive, English Dr. and Southwest Blvd. are main streets in the neighborhood which houses the historical West Charlotte High School.
- Washington Heights is a historic streetcar suburb north of Biddleville.
- Wesley Heights is an original streetcar suburb mainly developed in the 1920s by E.C. Griffith. It is a historically registered neighborhood adjacent to uptown Charlotte.
- Westchester is located along Freedom Dr. and near the Thomasboro-Hoskins neighborhood.
- Westerly Hills is a neighborhood primarily located on Alleghany St. that is home to Harding University High School between Freedom Dr. and Wilkinson Blvd.
- Wilmore is a historically registered neighborhood adjacent to South End.
- Wandawood Acres is the neighborhood surrounding Alleghany St, Ashley Rd and Wilkinson Blvd, west of uptown Charlotte.
- Yorkmount Park is the area surrounding the intersection of Tyvola Rd and Nations Ford Rd.
