= Highland Creek =

Highland Creek may refer to:

== Rivers ==
=== Ontario, Canada ===
- Highland Creek (Toronto), in Scarborough, which flows into Lake Ontario
- Highland Creek, in Kenora and Rainy River districts, a tributary of the Little Turtle River
- Highland Creek, in Lambton County, which flows into Lake Huron
- Highland Creek, in Renfrew County, a tributary of the Madawaska River (Ontario)

=== United States ===
- Highland Creek, a tributary of the Rubicon River (California)

== Settlements ==
- Highland Creek, Toronto, in Ontario, Canada
- Highland Creek (Charlotte neighborhood), a large subdivision in southern North Carolina, United States.
