= Washington Heights, North Carolina =

Predominantly-Black neighborhood in Charlotte, NC, USA

Coordinates: 35°15′22″N 80°51′37″W

Washington Heights is a neighborhood area of Charlotte, North Carolina. It was founded in 1912 as a planned streetcar suburb for mainly Black residents along the Beatties Ford Road streetcar line. Washington Heights was further developed during 1930s, with the addition of streets lined with bungalows and locally owned businesses. The late 1960s saw the construction of the Brookshire Freeway, which went through the southern end of the neighborhood. More recent preservation and redevelopment projects aim to maintain the neighborhood's cultural heritage, while addressing housing and investment challenges.

== History ==
=== Founding and early development (1913–1930s) ===
Named in honor of Booker T. Washington., Washington Heights was founded in June of 1912 by Freehold Realty as a planned suburb along the Beatties Ford Road streetcar line, intended for middle-class Black residents. By June 1913, 43 lots had been sold and development continued until the economic depression following World War I.

Street names were named after Black figures such as community leader Thad L. Tate; D.J. Sanders, the first Black president of Johnson C. Smith University; Booker, and Douglas.. Lot prices ranged roughly from $300 to $500; minimum house‑construction prices ranged from $600 to $1,000; additionally, there were no racial deed restrictions compared to similar neighborhoods like Dilworth and Elizabeth

Around 200 bungalows were built between the 1910s and 1930s, predominantly one‑story homes that were wood‑frame with porches

=== Commercial and social expansion (1930s–1940s) ===
Commercial activity expanded along Beatties Ford Road during the late 1930s-’40s, as wooden storefronts gave way to two‑story brick and concrete buildings featuring grocery stores, salons, photography studios, and drug stores.

The Excelsior Club, established around 1944 by Jimmie McKee, operated as an Art Moderne social and political hub hosting community meetings, politicians, and musicians like Nat King Cole, James Brown, and Louis Armstrong. The club was expanded in 1952 and operated until 2016, closing due to lack of business and rising maintenance costs. The building was purchased in 2020 by Kenwood Investments and not much work has been done.

The Ritz Theater was another space of social relevance, having opened in the 1960s as a theater exclusively for Black residents. The theater had 500 seats and offered movie screenings for 25 cents a ticket before closing in 1971.

=== Mid‑20th century challenges ===
The neighborhood was bisected from 1968 onwards, by freeway and ramp construction for the (Brookshire Freeway), causing the loss of Douglas St. Additionally, plans for Lincoln Park, a creek‑side green space imagined in the establishment of the neighborhood, never materialized

== Preservation and revitalization ==
=== Jim Patterson ===
The very few remaining pre‑WWII grocery store buildings date to the 1920s. One surviving example is Jim Patterson’s Grocery at 2515 Booker Avenue. Preserve Mecklenburg purchased the property in 2020 to protect it, but the property was later sold to Ellis Legacy Group (Henry & Todd Ellis) in 2021 for redevelopment as community‑oriented space, under preservation easement.

=== Ritz at Washington Heights ===
The site of the former segregation‑era Ritz Theater was transformed into The Ritz at Washington Heights, a pocket park and community gathering space. Funded by Lowe’s 100 Hometowns Grant ($200,000), plus $50,000 from Charlotte’s Corridors of Opportunity and $25,000 from the neighborhood association. Built in about three months, the space opened November 2021. The 0.17-acre area features Wi‑Fi, a performance stage, seating, murals, a play area, and honors community history.

== Community and demographics ==
As of 2022, Washington Heights spans approximately 276 acres with about 1,741 residents and a median household income of $31,222. The neighborhood has a 85% Black population compared to Mecklenburg County's 30% Black population. Homeownership (24%) is significantly lower than Mecklenburg County average (56%), while home values average $100,111, about one-third of county average. The neighborhood remains walkable, tree‑lined, and within ½ mile of public transit. The CityLynx Gold Line light rail stops near, and bus service continues along former streetcar corridors. Local schools include University Park Creative Arts School and Northwest School of the Arts.

== Notable residents and leadership ==
Mattie Marshall has served as president of the Washington Heights Community Association for more than 30 years. The association participates in neighborhood engagement and revitalization initiatives, including the Ritz project and transit planning efforts.

== Urban renewal, investment, and gentrification ==
The Corridors of Opportunity program and other public‑private investments (e.g., Five Points Plaza, $6 million) are reshaping Charlotte’s west side, including Washington Heights, bringing new infrastructure and business activity to the area. At the same time, residents and advocacy groups have expressed concern about potential displacement and the loss of cultural identity.

== See also ==
- Biddleville
- Johnson C. Smith University
- List of Charlotte neighborhoods
