= Clanton Park =

Clanton Park may refer to:

- Clanton Park (Charlotte, North Carolina), a park in Charlotte, North Carolina
- Clanton Park, Toronto, a neighborhood in Toronto, Ontario, Canada
