= East Forest (Charlotte Neighborhood) =

Coordinates: 35°09′51″N 80°44′57″W

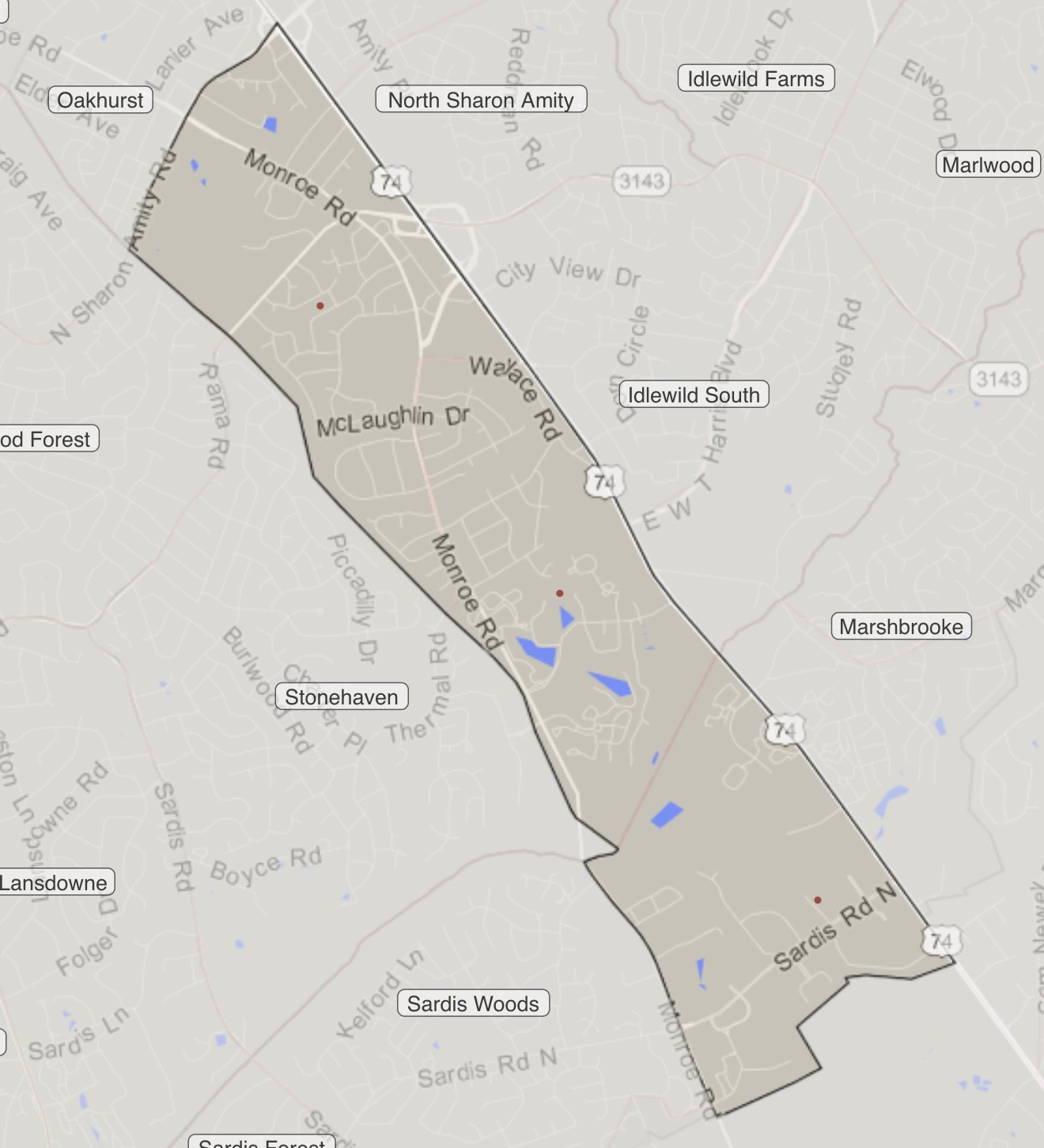
- Country: United States
- State: North Carolina
- County: Mecklenburg
- City: Charlotte

Population
  - Total: 12,717
- according to point2homes.com
- ZIP code: 28211, 28212, 28277, 28270
- Area codes: 704, 980

The East Forest neighborhood of Charlotte, North Carolina was established in the 1960s and 1970s. The neighborhood is bounded by N Sharon Amity Rd to the north, Sardis Rd N to the south, Independence Boulevard (US 74) to the east, and Monroe Rd to the southwest. Neighboring areas include Stonehaven, Sardis Woods, Oakhurst, Sherwood Forest, and Idlewild South. The area’s dominant architectural style is ranch-style, split-level and Craftsman designs with brick or wood exterior.

== Education ==
The neighborhood's public schools are served by Charlotte-Mecklenburg Schools. The neighborhood is primarily zoned for East Mecklenburg High School with some southeastern parts zoned for Butler High School. The neighborhood is also zoned for McClintock Middle School and Crestdale Middle School as well as Rama Road Elementary School, Greenway Park Elementary School, and Matthews Elementary School.

== Demographics ==
East Forest offers a diverse population with 45.8% of residents being African-American, 25.7% being Caucasian, 18.9% being Hispanic, 4.9% being Asian, and 4.6% being other.
