= Dimple Ajmera =

American politician

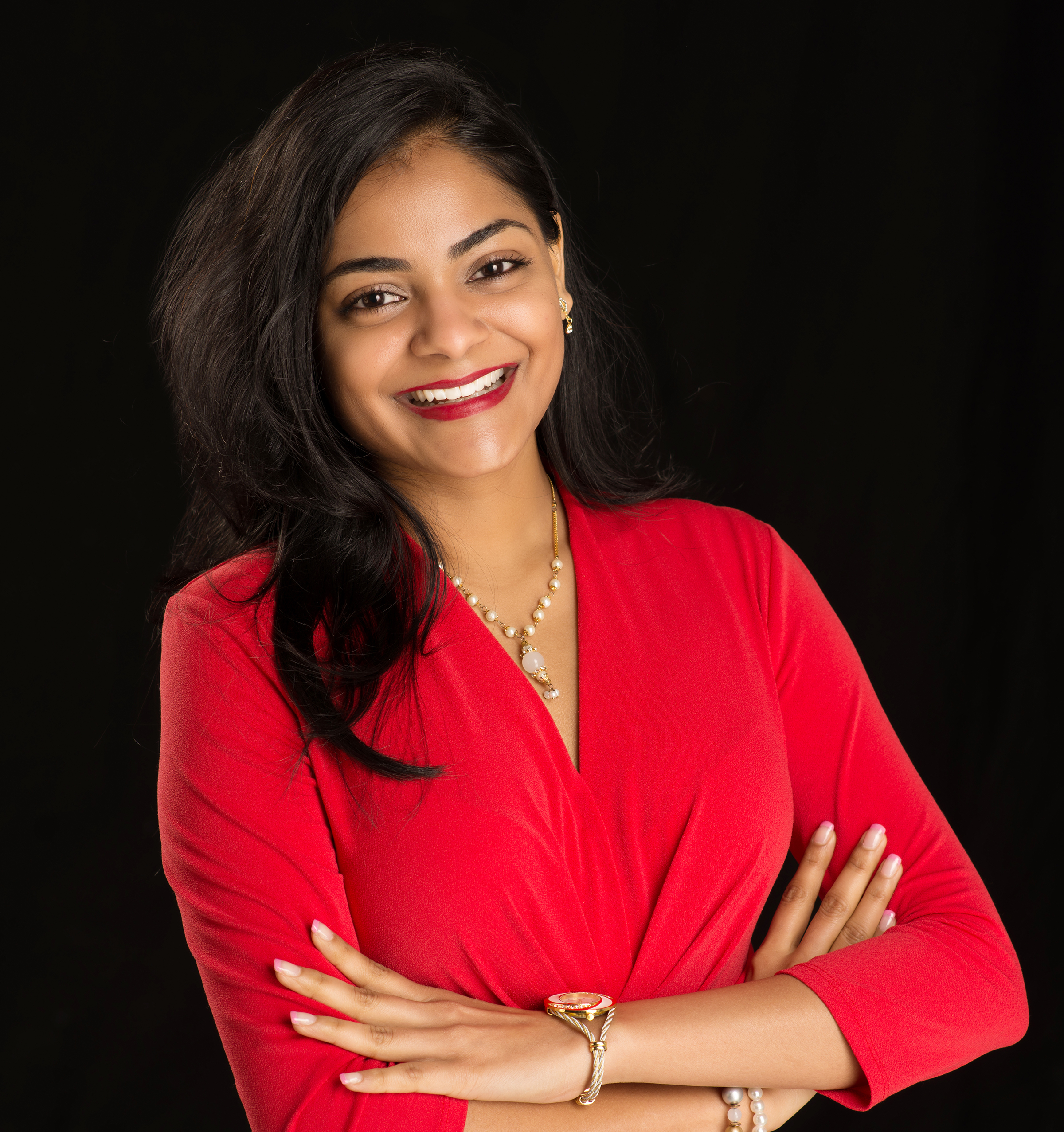

Member of the Charlotte City Council from the at-large district
- Incumbent
- Assumed office January 1, 2018
- Preceded by: Claire Fallon; Vi Lyles

Member of the Charlotte City Council from the 5th district
- In office January 1, 2017 – December 31, 2017
- Preceded by: John Autry
- Succeeded by: Matt Newton

Personal details
- Born: Dimple Tansen Ajmera; September 2, 1986 (age 39) Surat, India
- Party: Democratic
- Spouse: Vaibhav Bajaj (m. 2018)
- Education: University of Southern California (BS)

Dimple Tansen Ajmera (born September 2, 1986) is an American politician and accountant who has served on the Charlotte City Council since 2017. Ajmera is the first Asian-American and youngest woman to ever hold this position. In 2021, she became the second sitting Charlotte City Council member to give birth since the arrival of her daughter in 2021. A member of the Democratic Party, Ajmera was a candidate for North Carolina State Treasurer in the 2020 primary.

== Early life and education ==
Dimple Tansen Ajmera was born in Surat, India into a Gujarati family. With little means, Ajmera's parents immigrated to the U.S. to provide their children with greater opportunities. Her parents relocated the family to Durham, North Carolina in 2003 where they found work at a motel.

Ajmera graduated from Southern High School in Durham. She described adjusting to life in the United States as “joy paired with challenges and difficulties.” She faced a cultural shock and language barrier, as she was used to speaking Gujarati and Hindi at home. Some of her teachers and guidance counselors stayed after school, helping her learn English.

She then attended University of Southern California. Upon graduation, Ajmera was recruited by Deloitte & Touche LLP in Los Angeles, and earned her CPA license in 2011. Later, she was recruited to work for TIAA-CREF in North Carolina. Ajmera stated that after the sudden passing of her father, she decided to leave the finance sector and work on the City Council.

== Career ==
In 2017, Ajmera was unanimously appointed to fill the remainder of Rep. John Autry's term in the City Council representing the 5th district. Later in 2017, Ajmera successfully ran for an At-Large seat on the City Council. She received endorsements from Harvey Gantt the first Black Mayor of Charlotte, and Hugh McColl former CEO of Bank of America.

During her tenure on city council, Ajmera played an integral role in securing the funding and neighborhood support for the St. John's Place affordable housing development. She is widely known for expanding access to affordable housing, increasing local awareness on school safety, and bringing traction and economic opportunities to the 69-acre Eastland site, an area left undeveloped for years. Ajmera is also known for chairing the Environment Committee and helping Charlotte become a global leader in sustainability with bipartisan support. The adoption of the Strategic Energy Action Plan (SEAP) is the city's first ever framework to transition to a low carbon future. Within 24 hours of its passing, former New York City Mayor Michael Bloomberg visited Charlotte to announce a $2.5 million grant from his foundation towards Charlotte's efforts to fight climate change. She received the Blue Sky Award for Public Policy Work in 2019 by Clean Air Carolina, an advocacy group focused on air quality, climate change, and environmental justice in North Carolina.

For Charlotte Mecklenburg Schools, Ajmera advocated for funding ($4.6 million) to improve safety for students including hiring more mental health workers and training staff workers for mental health care. In 2019, she successfully championed affordable health care for thousands of city employees.

In 2019, Ajmera was re-elected to serve a second term on the Charlotte City Council. Later in 2019, Ajmera was recruited to run for North Carolina State Treasurer. January and February polling in the North Carolina Democratic primary placed her as the frontrunner, though with 80% of voters still undecided. After running a 90-day statewide campaign for NC State Treasurer, Ajmera earned 387, 616 votes but missed victory for the Democratic nomination by 1.6% of the vote in the March 3, 2020 Democratic primary. Ajmera continues to serve as Charlotte City Councilwoman At Large.

== Personal life ==
On July 23, 2018, she was proposed to by Vaibhav Bajaj after a City Council meeting. She married Bajaj, a dentist, in Charlotte, NC on November 4, 2018. She and her husband welcomed their first child, Charlotte Bajaj Ajmera, on June 26, 2021, naming her after the city they fell in love with.
