= York Road (Charlotte neighborhood) =

- Neighborhood
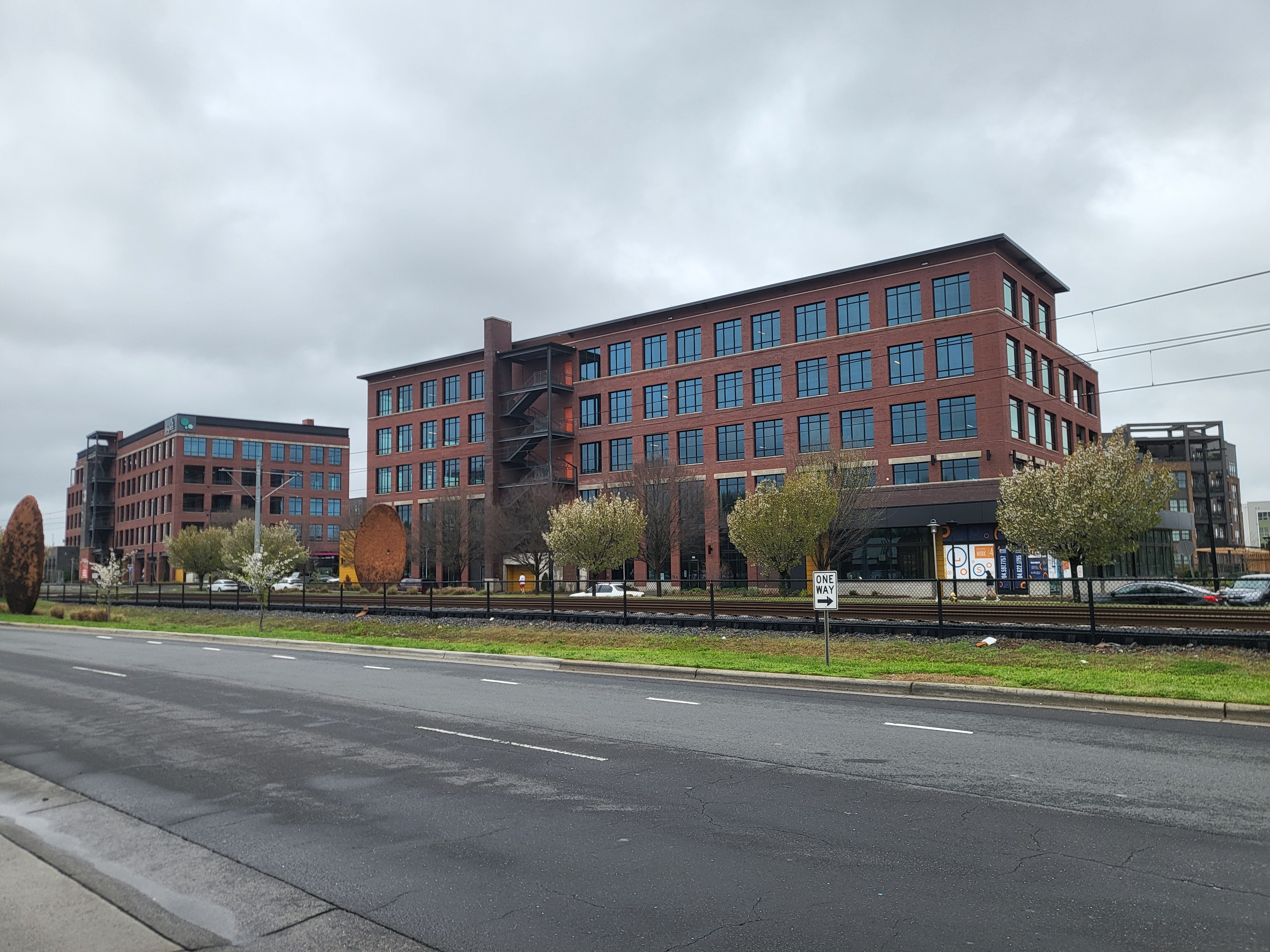
- LoSo Station 3 & 4 along South Blvd in March 2024
- Interactive map of York Road
- Coordinates: 35.187298°N 80.880089°W
- Country: United States
- State: North Carolina
- County: Mecklenburg County
- City: Charlotte
- Council District: 3
- Annexed: 1960

Government
  - City Council: Victoria Watlington
- Time zone: UTC-5 (EST)
  - Summer (DST): UTC-4 (EDT)
- Zip Code: 28209, 28217
- Area codes: 704, 980

York Road, and recently referred to as Lower South End (LoSo) by redevelopers and businesses wanting to emulate the Charlotte neighborhoods of NoDa and South End, is a mixed-use development neighborhood of commercial, industrial, and residential in Charlotte, North Carolina. Located along South Tryon Street (NC 49), it is bounded by Woodlawn Road to the south, Bill Lee Freeway (I-77/US 21) to the west, Clanton Road to the north, and South Boulevard to the east.

== History ==
Originally known as York Road, it was named after the road York Road before Charlotte annexed the neighborhood in 1960, changing the name to South Tryon Street.

In 2009, The Olde Mecklenburg Brewery opened on Southside Drive (moving to Yancey Road in 2014); which was followed by other breweries and entertainment/restaurants to the area. By the Mid-2010s the name Lower South End (LoSo) began appearing as a place name for the area; the Charlotte Observer first mentions Lower South End in a 2016 article called Is ‘LoSo’ the new Charlotte drinking district?

The name change sparked discussions about renaming neighborhoods with tacky and/or generic names, with some proposing to rename the area Queen Park, named after a drive-in movie theater (and sign that outlived it) that used to be in the area. Since then, several businesses have incorporated Lower South End or LoSo in their names; in 2019, a 15-acre (6.1 ha) mixed-use development, spearheaded by Beacon Partners, began construction next to the Scaleybark station called LoSo Station.

== Transportation infrastructure ==
=== Mass transit ===
Scaleybark station, located at the intersection of South Boulevard and Whitton Street, is a stop along the Lynx Blue Line, operated by the Charlotte Area Transit System (CATS). The station includes a 315-space park and ride, located nearby on Dewitt Lane.

CATS also operates the following bus routes that traverse through the neighborhood:

- #2 (Ashley Park/Scaleybark)
- #12 (South Boulevard)
- #16 (South Tryon)
- #24 (Nations Ford Road)
- #30 (Woodlawn Crosstown)
