= Croft Historic District =

Historic district in North Carolina, United States

- U.S. National Register of Historic Places
- U.S. Historic district
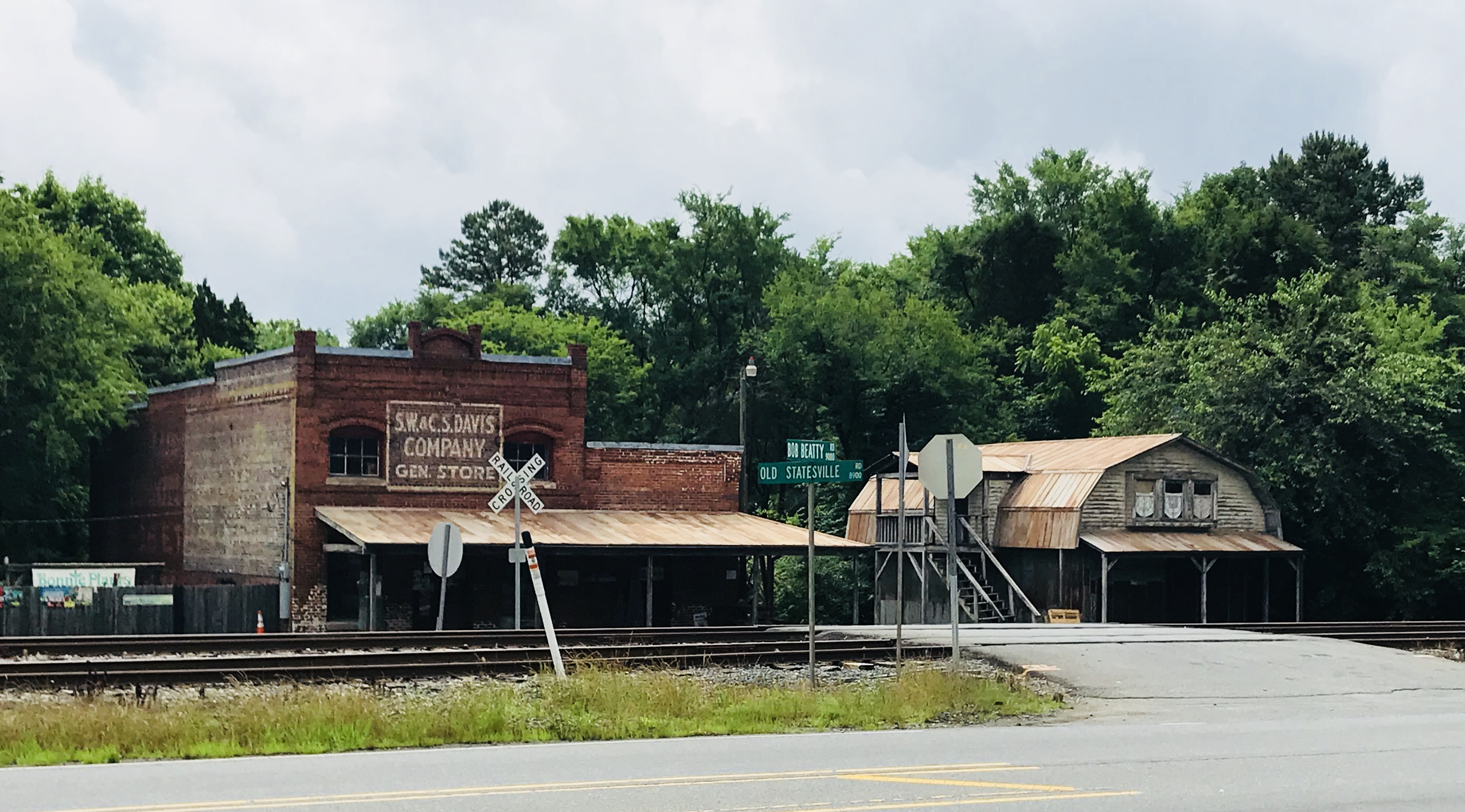

- Location within North Carolina Location within the United States
- Location: Jct. of NC 115 and NC 2483, near Charlotte, North Carolina
- Coordinates: 35°20′44″N 80°49′23″W
- Area: 8 acres (3.2 ha)
- Built: c. 1890
- Architectural style: Queen Anne, Early Commercial
- NRHP reference No.: 99000699
- Added to NRHP: June 10, 1999

Croft Historic District is a national historic district located near Charlotte, Mecklenburg County, North Carolina. The district encompasses seven contributing buildings and one contributing structure in the crossroads community of Croft in rural Mecklenburg County. Contributing resources include the S. W. & C. S. Davis General Store (1908), two-story Queen Anne style S. W. Davis House (1903) and flower house (c. 1903), the old Croft School (c. 1890, c. 1912), three warehouses (c. 1910, c. 1925, and c. 1930), and a section of the (former) Atlantic. Tennessee and Ohio Railroad Tracks (1871).

It was added to the National Register of Historic Places in 1999.
