= Madison Park (Charlotte neighborhood) =

- Neighborhood
- Interactive map of Madison Park
- Coordinates: 35.167°N 80.861°W
- Country: United States
- State: North Carolina
- County: Mecklenburg County
- City: Charlotte
- Council District: 6
- Founded: 1950s
- Annexed: 1960

Government
  - City Council: Kimberly Owens

Area
  - Land: 998 acres (404 ha)

Population (2018)
  - Total: 5,476
- Time zone: UTC-5 (EST)
  - Summer (DST): UTC-4 (EDT)
- Zip Code: 28209, 28210, 28217
- Area codes: 704, 980
- Website: madisonparkcharlotte.org

Madison Park, a neighborhood in Charlotte, North Carolina, United States, is primarily made up of single-family and multi-family residential homes. It is commonly referred to as the Montford/Madison Park/Park Road Shopping Center area; acknowledged in a 2018 survey of more than 5,000 Charlotte residents. The zip-codes that make up Madison Park include 28217, 28210, and 28209. The neighborhood is located between South Boulevard, East Woodlawn Road, Park Road, and slightly extends beyond Tyvola Road. It has a Neighborhood Association, whereby the board of directors help determine the neighborhood boundaries.

Madison Park hosts one of the largest National Night Out events in Charlotte; their 8th hosting on August 2, 2011 estimated over 1,000 residents. The latest event occurred August 6, 2019.

== History ==
Madison Park was developed 70 years ago in the mid to late 1950s, as one of the first post-World War II neighborhoods in Charlotte. It consists of brick, ranch-style homes and was originally catered to the middle-class family. Today, a mix of original homes and other styles such as cape cods, split levels and mid-century modern can be found.

== Demographics ==
- Population (2018): 5,476
- Population density (2018): 5 people per acre
- Race & ethnicity (2017)
  - 70.3% White
  - 13.7% Hispanic or Latino
  - 5.5% Black or African American
  - 8.7% Asian
  - 1.8% All other races
- Median household income (2017): $87,209

== Transportation ==
- Lynx Blue Line: The nearest light rail stations include Woodlawn and Tyvola
- Charlotte Area Transit System (CATS) has many bus stop surrounding the neighborhood, primarily found on E Woodland Road, South Boulevard, and Park Road.

While most errands require a car, Madison Park is considered a walkable and bikable neighborhood.

== Education ==
- Elementary
  - Park Road Montessori
  - Pinewood Elementary
- Middle
  - Alexander Graham Middle School
- High
  - Myers Park High School

== Nearby Sites of Interest ==
- Park Road Shopping Center - 425,408 square foot shopping center; developed in 1956 as the first open air shopping institution in Charlotte.
- SouthPark Mall (Charlotte, North Carolina)
- Marion Diehl Park – includes a track and field, gym, pool, and senior center.
- 72-acre Park Road Park – 11-acre lake, tennis, outdoor sport courts, playgrounds, and trails.
- Freedom Park (Charlotte, North Carolina)
- Montford drive
