= Park Road Shopping Center =

Shopping mall in North Carolina

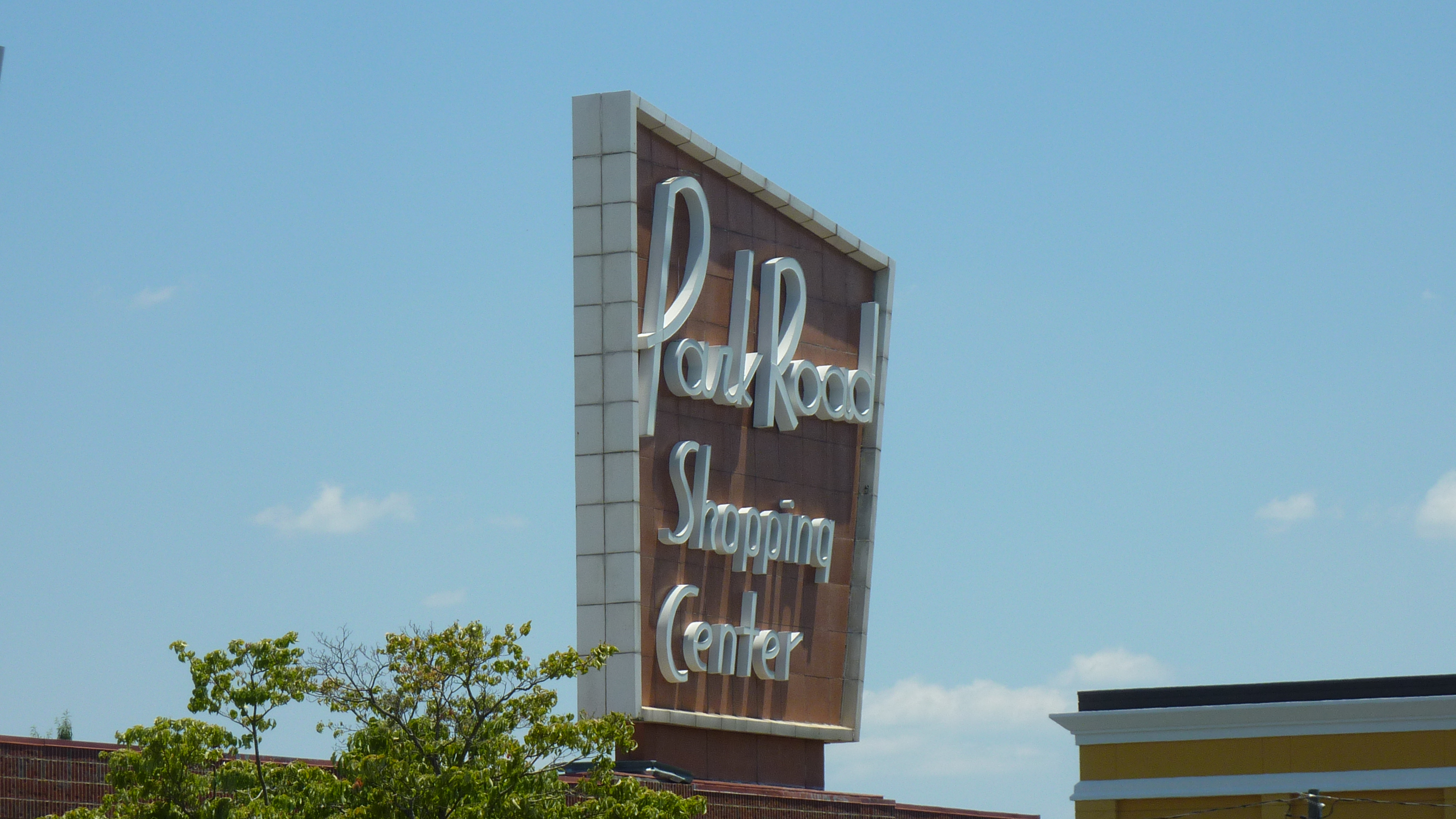
- The original 1956 Park Road Shopping Center billboard has an Art Deco feel and stands at the southeast end of the mall
- Location: Charlotte, North Carolina, United States
- Coordinates: 35.173980°N 80.848834°W
- Address: 4201 Park Rd.
- Opened: November 15, 1956
- Developer: A.V. Blankenship
- Owner: Edens
- Num. of stores: 65
- Floor area: 425,408 sq ft (39,521.7 m^{2})
- Floors: 1
- Website: parkroadshoppingcenter.com

Park Road Shopping Center is an open air strip mall located in Charlotte, North Carolina. It is located northeast of the intersection of Woodlawn Road and Park Road in the south central part of Charlotte. Park Road Shopping Center has a nostalgic ambience, which is sustained by the soda shop, Ace Hardware (Black Hawk Hardware) and many other stores that date back to the Post-World War II baby boom era.

== History ==
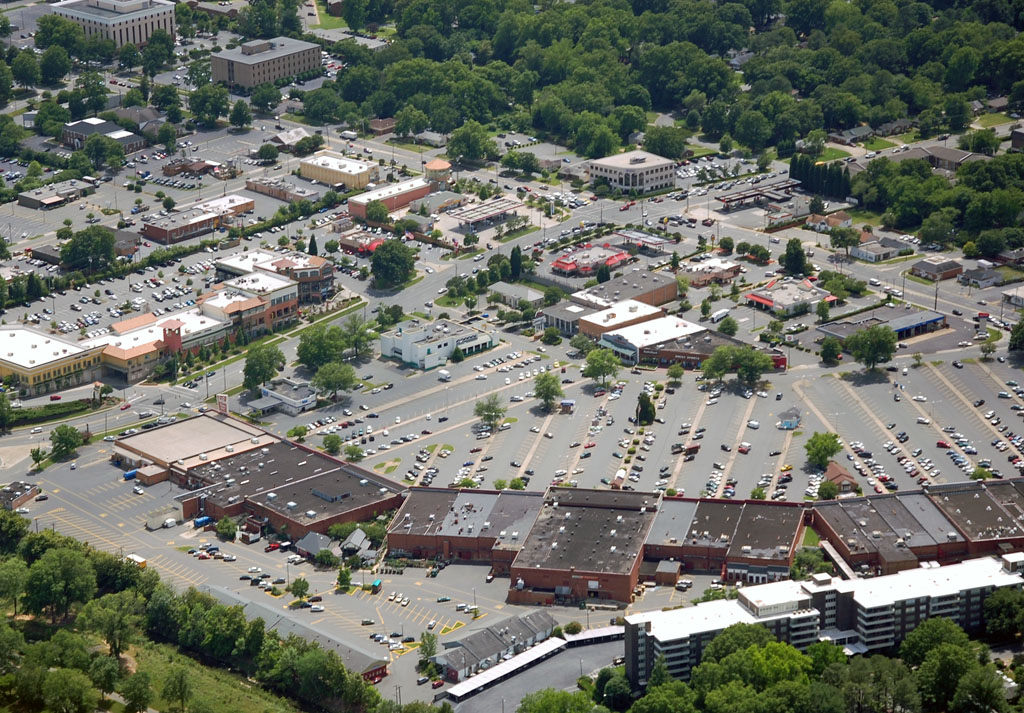
Park Road Shopping Center, Charlotte, NC

Park Road Shopping Center opened up on November 15, 1956 and was Charlotte's very first open area-type shopping mall. Developed by A.V. Blankenship, it is typical of Mid-Century modern architecture and the original billboard sign remains today. When the mall was first envisioned, it was considered to be a shift in area business development. At this time period most of the shopping areas were still located in and around downtown Charlotte. Meanwhile, more and more people continued to move to the suburbs and outlying areas of the city. This has been the catalyst that has kept the shopping center successful to this day. Park Road Shopping Center is a very bustling mall and serves many of the surrounding Charlotte neighborhoods such as Myers Park, Barclay Downs, Parkdale, Colonial Village, Madison Park, Sedgefield, Ashbrook, and Starmount. In 1967 a local attorney named Porter Byrum bought Park Road Shopping Center. On June 16, 2011 Mr. Byrum announced that Park Road Shopping Center would be donated to 3 local colleges (Queens University of Charlotte, Wingate University, and Wake Forest University). Mr. Byrum had held ownership of the shopping center for nearly 44 years. Just one month later these 3 colleges sold the shopping center for $82 million to EDENS, a shopping center operator and developer. Despite these sudden changes in ownership, it is expected that the shopping center will continue on as is. It is easy to walk or bike to the Park Road Shopping Center since it lies on the Little Sugar Creek Greenway. In 2014 the center underwent a renovation. It was painted white, given wooden features, outdoor seating was added and the covered walkways got new lighting and floor treatment.
