= Cherry (Charlotte neighborhood) =

- Neighborhood
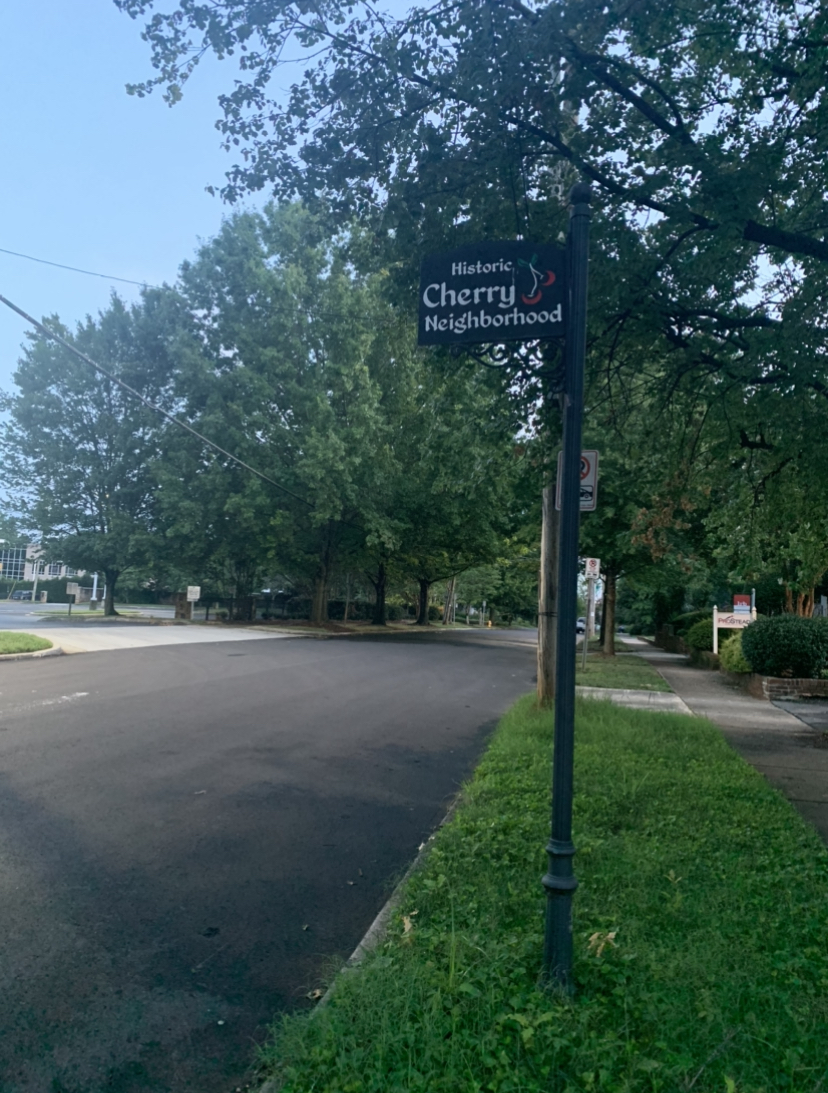
- Photograph of "Historic Cherry Neighborhood" sign
- Interactive map of Cherry
- Coordinates: 35.21154°N 80.83354°W
- Country: United States
- State: North Carolina
- County: Mecklenburg County
- City: Charlotte
- Council District: 1
- Founded: 1891
- Annexed: 1907

Government
  - City Council: Larken Egleston
- Time zone: UTC-5 (EST)
  - Summer (DST): UTC-4 (EDT)
- Zip Code: 28204, 28207
- Area codes: 704, 980

Cherry is a historical African-American neighborhood in Charlotte, North Carolina. Adjacent to Uptown Charlotte, it is bounded within Little Sugar Creek, Kenilworth Avenue, John Belk Freeway, East 4th Street, Queens Road, and Henley Place.

== History ==
The neighborhood's development was unusual upon inception. Cherry was planted in 1891 by John Myers using land that was part of his thousand-acre cotton farm. Myers wished to "develop [it] for the negro race, giving them such a modern convenience as would make their contentment and comfort."

Myers is noted that the anticipated outcome was to create "better citizens" and homeowners, reflecting that the community would produce "thrifty, industrious, well-behaved and construction forces in their race.

Despite the original goal, Cherry provided housing for Black skilled and unskilled laborers at the turn of the century. Residents had the option to rent or purchase homes and were creating a community that boasted urban amenities, including a city park, school, churches, and tree-lined streets.

Homeownership in Cherry increased from twenty-six percent in 1905 to as many as sixty-five percent by 1925. The Myers family sold lots that ranged from $40 per lot to $100 per lot. This was considered affordable compared to the $300 to $600 lots available in Washington Heights.

Myers also sold the land for two churches to be built in the community. Pleasant Hill Baptist Church and a Lutheran church that later became Mount Zion Church of Holiness in 1946. In 1919 the Myers family deeded a parcel of land to create the Myers Chapel A.M.E Zion Church.

The family also designated land for a community park. Morgan Park, later named Cherry Park on July 18, 2006, was initiated in 1927.

John and Mary Myers transferred control of their Cherry holding to their children. Improvements were made between the 1930s and 1940s, including the installation of indoor restrooms and general updates to the home's support columns. Black property ownership expanded during the 1950s.

The growth convinced John Dwelle and Brevard Myers to begin increasing their holdings in Cherry. Cherry was one of the few neighborhoods to escape federally funded Urban Renewal, unlike the neighborhood of Brooklyn, Greenville, First Ward, and the Third Ward. In response to recent developments Cherry community Development Association was organized in the 1960s'.

The Cherry Community Organization would then purchase property from the city and rehabilitate homes with city-sponsored low-interest loans, collecting rent from the remaining property.

=== Gentrification ===
Due to growth, developers and affluent homeowners have moving in, upscale apartment complexes and expensive homes are being built. Low and middle-income residents are being priced out from Cherry and are being displaced. The location is attractive to buyers and developers because it's located a mile southeast of Charlotte's Uptown. Because of the displacement of those who couldn't afford to stay has resulted in Cherry going from 66 percent African-American back in the 1990s to 57 percent white as of 2019. Easier access to public transportation has also aided with Cherry's gentrification as developers move in to purchase vacant lots and cheaper houses.

== Subdivisions ==
Cherry has one subdivision, Midtown, which includes the Metropolitan and Midtown Crossing strip malls as well as Little Sugar Creek Greenway and Midtown Park. The area was once the site of Charlottetown Mall, the first fully-enclosed shopping center in the Southeast, and fourth major interior mall in the United States; it operated from 1959 to 2003, razed in 2005.
