= Chantilly (Charlotte neighborhood) =

Coordinates: 35.211°N 80.804°W

- Interactive map of Chantilly
- Country: United States
- State: North Carolina
- County: Mecklenburg
- City: Charlotte

Area
  - Total: 0.438 sq mi (1.134 km^{2})

Population (2009)
  - Total: 1,335
- according to City-Data.com
- Zip Code: 28205

The Chantilly Neighborhood is located between the Elizabeth and Plaza-Midwood neighborhoods, in Charlotte, North Carolina. The neighborhood was established in 1913, with later construction of many homes through the mid-1940s. Additional streets were added in the 1950s. Neighborhood boundaries consist of Independence Boulevard (NC Hwy 74) to the northeast, CSX Railroad Tracks to the west and south, and Briar Creek to the east. Chantilly is positioned adjacent to the northeast of Elizabeth, and south of Plaza-Midwood business district, featuring art galleries, funky stores, and restaurants. Chantilly contains a seven-acre public park called Chantilly Park. Maintained by Mecklenburg County, Chantilly Park is accessed at the southern end of Wyanoke Avenue in the southeastern portion of the neighborhood.
