= Cotswold (Charlotte neighborhood) =

Coordinates: 35.175370°N 80.800405°W

- Neighborhood
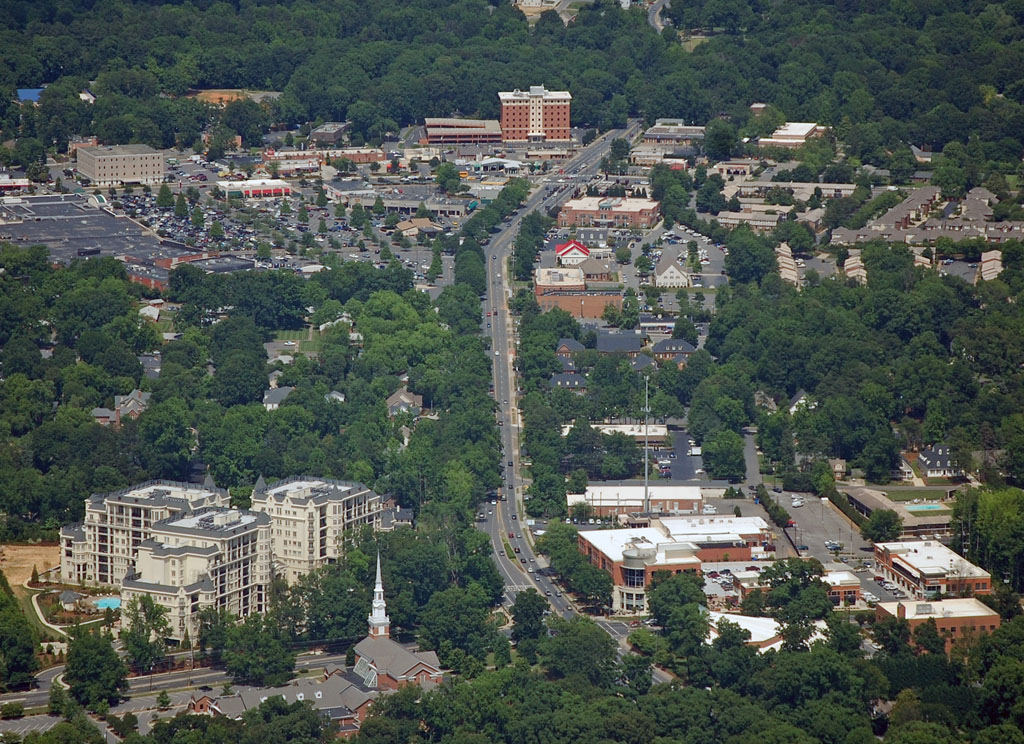
- Image of the surrounding Cotswold area

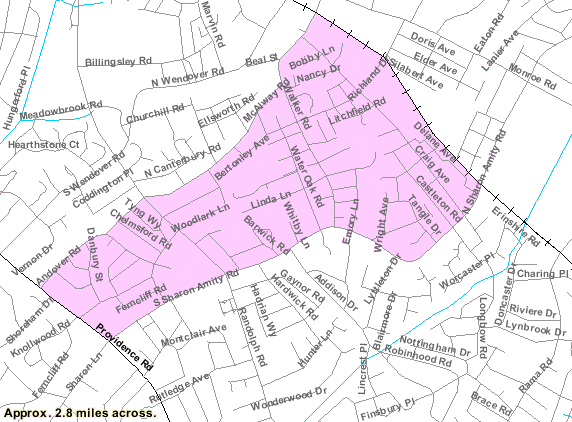
- Country: United States
- State: North Carolina
- County: Mecklenburg County
- City: Charlotte
- Council Districts: 1, 5, 6
- Neighborhood Profile Areas: 28, 320, 394

Government
  - City Council: Patsey Kinsey, John Autry, Kenny Smith

Area
  - Total: 850 acres (340 ha)

Population (2015)
  - Total: 5,199
  - Density: 3,900/sq mi (1,500/km^{2})
- Time zone: UTC-5 (EST)
  - Summer (DST): UTC-4 (EDT)
- Zip Code: 28211
- Area codes: 704, 980

The Cotswold neighborhood of Charlotte, North Carolina, United States, was named after the region of the same name in England. It is well known for a large shopping center, Cotswold Village Shops, located at the intersection of Randolph and Sharon Amity Roads. Originally known as Cotswold Mall, it was one of Charlotte's first suburban malls. Cotswold is emerging as one of the more desirable areas for living and shopping with close proximity to Uptown. Many 1950s and 1960s homes are being remodeled and sold.

The area is neighbored by Randolph Park, Echo Hills, Grier Heights, Myers Park, Oakhurst, Providence Park, Sherwood Forest, and Wendover/Sedgewood.

== Demographics ==
Historical population
| Census | Pop. | Note | %± |
|---|---|---|---|
| 2000 | 4,088 | | — |
| 2010 | 4,437 | | 8.5% |
| 2015 (est.) | 5,199 | | 17.2% |

As of 2010, Cotswold had a population of 4,437. The racial makeup of the neighborhood was 83.2% White, 11.1% Black or African American, 1.6% Asian, and 2.5% of some other race. Hispanic or Latino of any race were 5.7% of the population. The median household income for the area was $51,490.

== Transportation infrastructure ==
=== Mass transit ===
The following buses from the Charlotte Area Transit System (CATS) serve Cotswold:

- #14 (Providence Road)
- #15 (Randolph Road)
- #29 (UNCC/Southpark)
- #45x (Carmel Road Express)
- #61x (Arboretum Express)
- #62x (Rea Road Express)

=== Rail ===
The CSX Transportation rail line runs concurrent with Cotswold's eastern boundary, traveling between Charlotte, Monroe, and Wilmington.

=== Roads ===
The major thoroughfares in Cotswold are Providence Road, Randolph Road, and Sharon Amity.

== Education ==
=== School systems ===
Residents of Cotswold attend Charlotte-Mecklenburg Schools, including Cotswold Elementary, Eastover Elementary, Alex Graham Middle School, Randolph Middle School, and Myers Park High School.

== Shopping ==
The Cotswold Village Shops is a major shopping center located at the center of Cotswold. The mall originally opened in 1963 as an hybrid enclosed mall/shopping strip located at the intersection of Randolph and Sharon Amity Roads. Originally, it was known as Cotswold Mall, with A&P, the Collins Company, Harris Teeter, Ivey's, and Rose's as tenants. The enclosed portion of the mall was converted to an open-air shopping center in the early 2000s. Harris Teeter is the only original tenant left that did not close.
