= Grier Heights =

Neighborhood in Charlotte, North Carolina, United States

Coordinates: 35.197°N 80.807°W

Grier Heights is a historically Black neighborhood in Charlotte, North Carolina. It was founded around the 1890s, originally called Grier Town, when a former slave Sam Billings bought 100 acres of land in the land.

== History ==
Grier Heights was originally a farming community of four houses in 1886. Billings wanted to create a place where Black people could learn and thrive in their own community. Eventually, it became a suburb that was home to lower-income families as well as middle-class African Americans. By the 1920s, Grier Heights was the home to several prominent Black residents, including Arthur Samuel Grier, a funeral-home director for whom the community is named, and James McVay, founder of Grier Heights’ Antioch Baptist Church.

Additional land was purchased in 1907. In 1927, the landowner pursued the need for a school. However, the Board of education offered a structure. Instead, the community, supervised by Nellie B. Dykes raised $505. The School Board Committee granted $500 and Rosenwald Fund. After this, the neighborhood got a school, Billingsville School.

The school was eventually renovated into the Grier Heights Community Center, currently a virtual learning hub due to the coronavirus pandemic. The neighborhood grew until the 1940s when Arthur Grier built 100 homes that were sold to African American soldiers returning from World War II.

== Gentrification ==
Like many inner-city neighborhoods, Grier Heights faces gentrification. Houses are being converted to rental property. The neighborhood is adjacent to several highly sought-after and extremely affluent neighborhoods.

== Website ==
Grier Heights Community Center
