= Quail Hollow (Charlotte neighborhood) =

Neighborhood in south Charlotte, North Carolina

Coordinates: 35.116414°N 80.842422°W

Quail Hollow is a neighborhood in south Charlotte roughly located in between Park Road and Carmel Road, south of Dilworth and north of Ballantyne and Pineville. The neighborhood is largely residential. It is adjacent to Quail Hollow Club, which is the primary home of the PGA Tour's Wells Fargo Championship. Growth and land value in this area has been on the rise due to its location near Interstate 77 and 485, and proximity to SouthPark, Pineville and Ballantyne.
