= Coulwood (Charlotte neighborhood) =

Collection of neighborhoods in Charlotte, North Carolina, US

Coordinates: 35.2979174°N 80.9445178°W

Coulwood is a collection of neighborhoods in Charlotte, North Carolina, located between the Brookshire Freeway and Mount Holly Rd. This community area was created c. 1953, and in 1958 the Coulwood Community Council was created. This area is home to Paw Creek Elementary School and Coulwood Middle School as well as Coulwood Park and the Coulwood community pool. This area also is home to an annual 4th of July parade and celebration that starts at the middle school and ends at the elementary school, with a celebration at the park and pool.
