= Eastover (Charlotte neighborhood) =

- Neighborhood
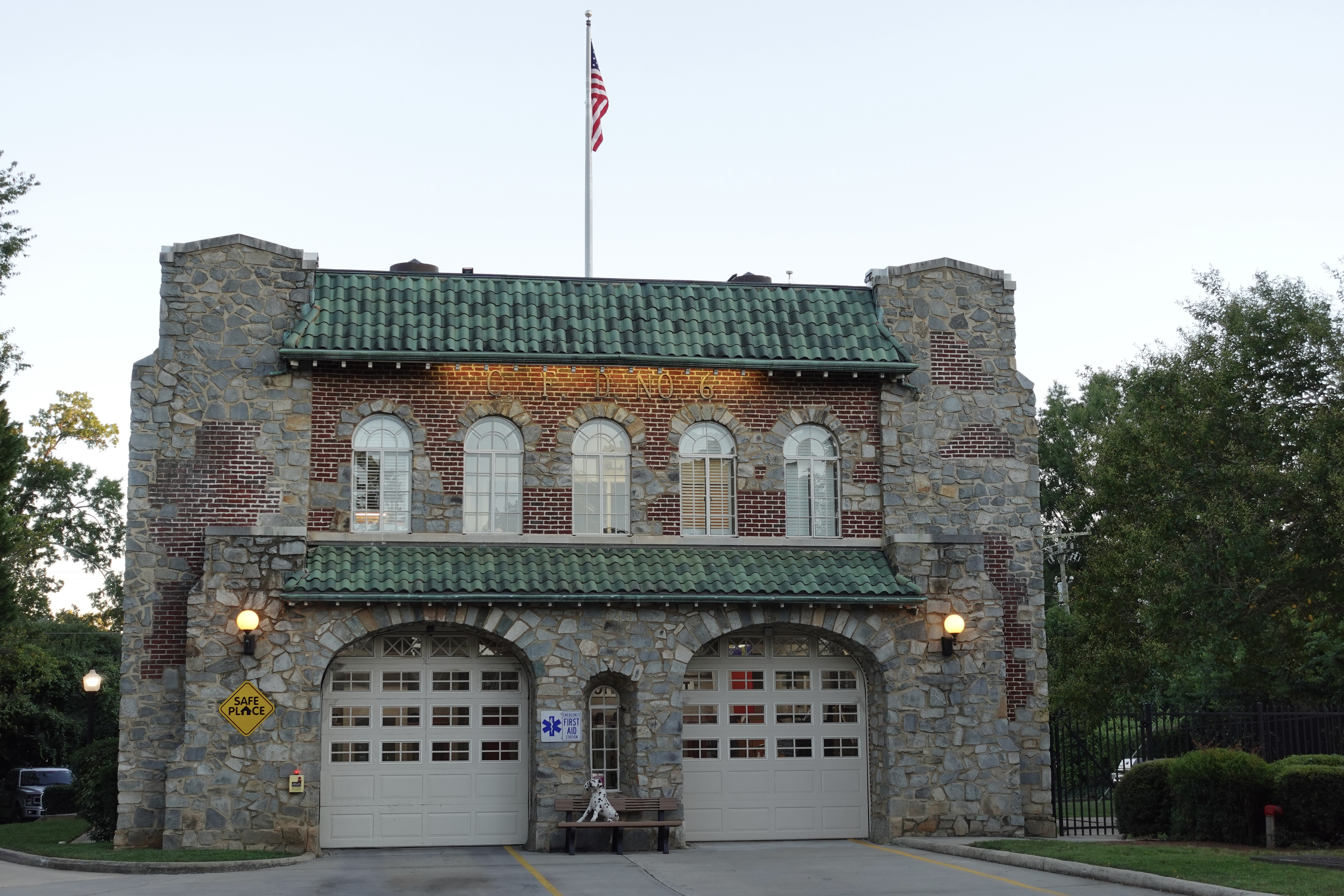
- Charlotte Fire Station No. 6 in the Eastover neighborhood
- Interactive map of Eastover
- Coordinates: 35.19300°N 80.81868°W
- Country: United States
- State: North Carolina
- County: Mecklenburg County
- City: Charlotte
- Council District: 1
- Annexed: 1928

Government
  - City Council: Larken Egleston

Population (2019)
  - Total: 2,765
- Time zone: UTC-5 (EST)
  - Summer (DST): UTC-4 (EDT)
- Zip Code: 28207
- Area codes: 704, 980

Eastover is a residential neighborhood in Charlotte, North Carolina, United States. Eastover was the city’s first suburb to build houses with driveways and has attracted many of the prominent leaders who shaped Charlotte’s growth. One of the neighborhood’s major landmarks is the Mint Museum Randolph, which attracts visitors from all over the Charlotte area.

== Location ==
Eastover is located southeast of Uptown Charlotte. It is bordered by Providence Road, Briar Creek, and Randolph Road. The Charlotte Convention Center, Spectrum Center, and the NASCAR Hall of Fame are nearby. Charlotte Douglas International Airport is less than 30 minutes away. Eastover Park, with over 30 acres of green space with multiple fields for baseball and soccer, hiking trails is part of this neighborhood.

== History ==
Before Eastover was a neighborhood, its land was originally home to the Spring Dale Dairy Farm. In 1927, the E.C. Griffith Company officially developed the land into what we now know as Eastover. The neighborhood has a reputation for attracting prominent residents such as Hugh McColl Jr., John Belk, and the E.C. Griffith family. All of these residents were community leaders who shaped much of Eastover and, ultimately, Charlotte’s growth. Many of the homes in Eastover were built in the late 1800s to early 1900s. Due to the community's historical popularity with the city's most prominent residents, homes in Eastover were the first properties with driveways designed for the newly invented automobile.

== Demographics ==
The Eastover neighborhood has a population of approximately 2,765. In 2017, the racial makeup of the area was 83.9% White, 5.1% from two or more races, 3.5% African American, 2.9% American Indian, 2.2% Asian, 1.2% Hispanic or Latino, and 1.1% from other races. In 2016, the median household income in Eastover was $159,099.

== Real estate ==
Houses in Eastover typically cost anywhere between $500,000 and $5 million. Some homes date back to the community's founding in the first half of the twentieth century, but newer builds with modern upgrades and additions are more likely to be encountered.

== Education ==
Public school students will attend Charlotte-Mecklenburg Schools, including Eastover Elementary, which was built in 1935 and is the area’s oldest elementary school. In addition to Eastover, the school also serves nearby neighborhoods, including Cherry, Elizabeth, Cotswold, and some portions of Myers Park. After attending Eastover Academy, students typically move on to attend Sedgefield Middle School and then Myers Park High School. The Queens University of Charlotte also has a campus next to the Eastover neighborhood. Established in 1857, this private university has approximately 2,300 undergraduate and graduate students, and is affiliated with the Presbyterian Church (USA).

== Nearby sites of interest ==
- Mint Museum
- Eastover Park
- Charlotte Convention Center
- Spectrum Center (arena)
- Bank of America Stadium
- NASCAR Hall of Fame
