= Derita (Charlotte neighborhood) =

Human settlement in Charlotte, North Carolina, United States of America

Coordinates: 35.296907°N 80.798873°W

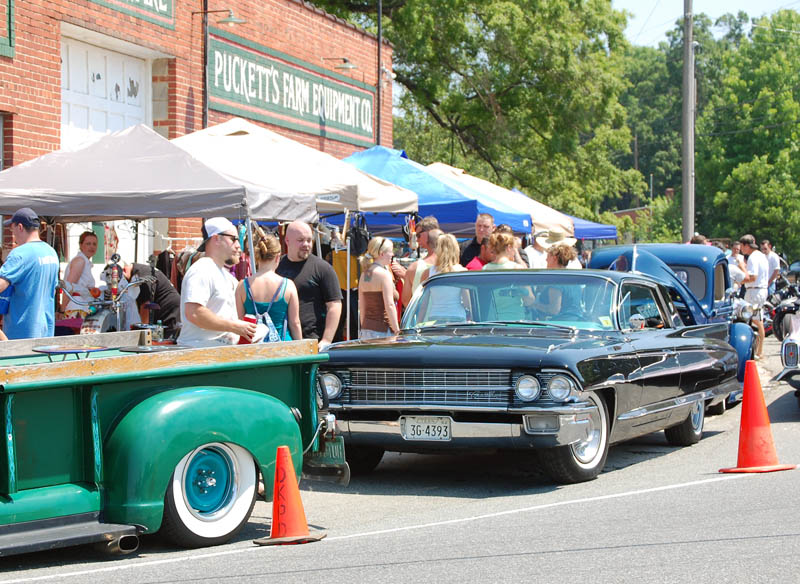
Puckett's Farm Equipment in Derita

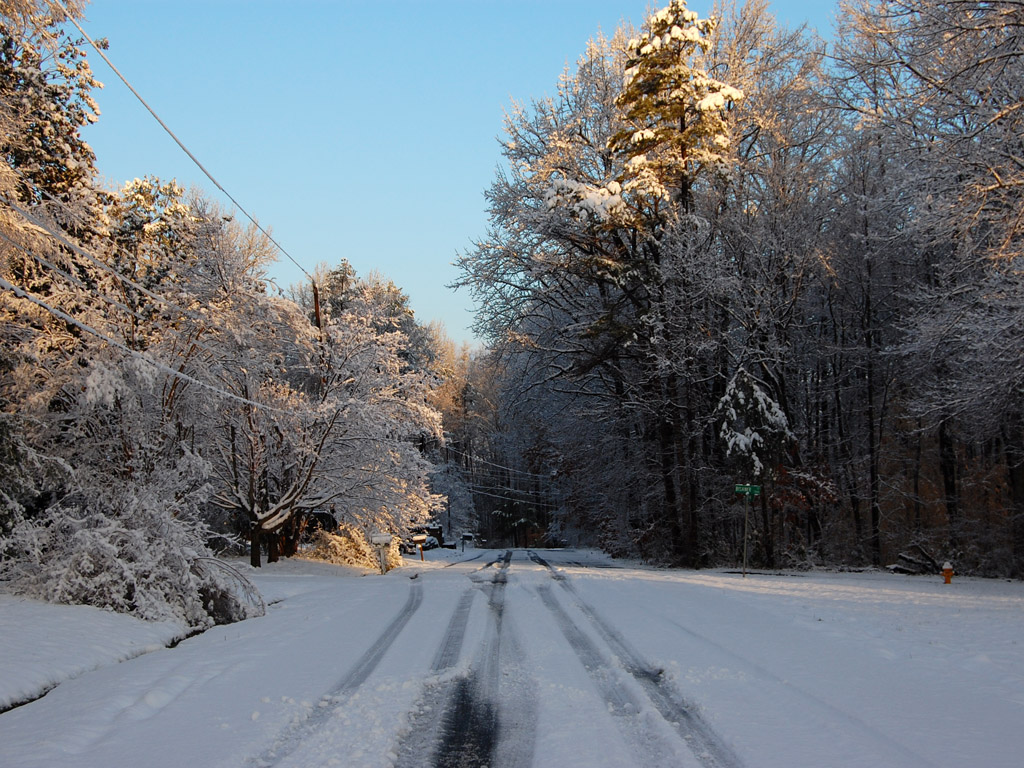
Snow in Derita, 2009

Derita is a neighborhood of Charlotte, North Carolina and is located several miles north of Charlotte. The neighborhood is bordered by I-77 to the west, I-85 to the east, and WT Harris Blvd to the north. Its business district is centered along West Sugar Creek Rd. Derita is located in almost the exact center of Mecklenburg County.

== History ==
The community became established 1860. Before that point, Derita was made up of large family farms carved from the forests and fields where the Sugaree Indians had made flint arrowheads and hunted for wild game. The first post office was established in 1882 with Amos L. Rumple as postmaster. The village was named after Derita Lewis, a friend of Mr. Rumple.

By the early-1950-60's the farms were giving way to rooftops as Charlotte's residential growth expanded. Today there are over 60,000 rooftops in the Derita area. Corporations like IBM and the (First Union) Wachovia Center moved into the Derita area. From 1914 until the 1930s, Ford Motor Company had a service branch plant and an assembly line in the Derita-Statesville area, at one point producing 300 cars a day. CMS launched an education experiment here called Governor's Village by clustering schools from Grades 1 - 12. Mecklenburg County purchased huge tracts of woodlands in the Derita area to create 320-acre (1.3 km^{2}) Nevin Community Park and the 192-acre (0.78 km^{2}) RibbonWalk Forest nature preserve. The headquarters for MEDIC, the Mecklenburg EMS Agency, are also located on Statesville Rd.

== Demographics ==
Derita is ethnically diverse and has a wide variety of housing stock from apartments, condos, and townhouses to starter homes, patio homes, second homes, and ranch-style homes on large wooded lots. It is a mix of older neighborhoods, newer HOA's, and developing neighborhoods --- represented by an umbrella Community Organization (DSRCO), now in its 45th year.
