= Reid Park (Charlotte neighborhood) =

Coordinates: 35°12′41″N 80°54′03″W

Reid Park is a historic African-American neighborhood on the west side of the U.S. city of Charlotte, North Carolina. It is one of the oldest African-American neighborhoods in the city. Located along West Boulevard, it lies east of Wingate Park, south of Westerly Hills and west of Revolution Park.

== History ==
The neighborhood was established in 1935 by an African-American landowner, Ross Reid. It was one of the first exclusively African-American neighborhoods in Charlotte. The City of Charlotte annexed Reid Park in 1959, and the number of homes and residents grew significantly thereafter. According to residents, in its first 40 years the neighborhood had a high quality of life; but by the early 1980s, the neighborhood began to decline, and crime rose. It became a popular location for crack cocaine dealers and gangs to set up shop, especially around the infamous Dalton Village housing projects. Several homes underwent major renovations in the mid 2000s, and by 2013 a majority of the homes that were once decaying were gone or renovated. A revitalization project in Reid Park began after the demolition of Dalton Village in 1998. As of today, the name "Reid Park" is no longer in use for the whole neighborhood; the eastern half is now called Arbor Glen.
