= Parkdale (Charlotte neighborhood) =

Coordinates: 35.157097°N 80.844930°W

Parkdale is a Charlotte, North Carolina residential, single-family neighborhood in the South Park area, approximately 1 mile West of SouthPark Mall and 1.5 mile South of the historic Park Road Shopping Center.

== Location ==
Parkdale’s Northern boundary is Briar Creek, Western boundary is Park Road, Southern boundary is the Picardy neighborhood, and Western boundaries are commercial development along Carnegie Road and residential Hatherly Road of the Barclay Downs neighborhood.

== Restrictions & Covenants ==
Neighborhood restrictions are recorded with the Mecklenburg County Register of Deeds Office and can be found in Deed Book 1672, Page 187. Restrictions auto-renew every 10 years as of 1985 and may be enforced by any of the 119 Block/Lot owners upon another. Block and Lot information can similarly be found in Map Book 7, Page 31 and Map Book 7, Page 33.

Restrictions include covenant for residential use, single-family only and is so qualified under 47B-3(13) Exception of the Marketable Title Act that otherwise extinguishes many legacy land-usage covenants.

== History ==
The American Investment Company purchased portions of the historic Billy Graham family dairy farm and Morrison Farms of South Charlotte in the early 1950s, intending to build a residential neighborhood of 150 single-family residences upon what is now known as Parkdale.

Original home construction for Parkdale consisted of split level and ranch-style houses typical of that era and suitable to the hilly terrain. The neighborhood’s main entrance along Park Road at Manning Drive was marked with a sign set in brickwork similar to nearby homes. This sign is currently in disrepair and illustrative how Parkdale’s historical presence has become obscured.

The area retains a diverse mix of mature Magnolia, White Oak, Tuliptree, Maple, Eastern White Pine, and Willow Oak trees. Many of the trees pre-date the era of construction and are now considered Heritage trees by Charlotte City Ordinance, protecting them from removal.

== Marketing ==
With Charlotte’s rapid expansion between 1990–2020 and desirability to live in the South Park area, Parkdale has been enveloped into the general area knowns as Barclay Downs, which is the name of the adjacent neighborhood on Parkdale’s Eastern boundary.

Area residents believe this shift in identity was promoted by local realtors marketing Parkdale residences as part of Barclay Downs, which is generally perceived to have higher property values. Consequently, from this marketing and because of a steady inflow of remodel and new home construction, values of Parkdale properties have increased relatively faster than those in Barclay Downs since 2010.

== Neighborhood Pool Membership ==
The Barclay Downs Swim & Racquet Club (BDSRC) is located in center of Barclay Downs area, approximately .5 miles North of SouthPark Mall. The club was established in 1961 and is a nonprofit, membership-owned club, built by the original Barclay Downs developers. Membership is limited to roughly 400 members and, while anyone may apply for membership, it is generally intended for just Barclay Downs area residents.

BDSRC admits new members based on prioritization of legacy membership, ownership within the BD Resident Map, and time being on the “wait list”. The new resident map mostly follows the outer boundaries of Barclay Downs, Parkdale, and Picardy neighborhoods. Historically, the club is able to grant 20-30 new memberships per year due to resignations and new residents can expect to wait 1–2 years on the wait list; non-residents are not guaranteed membership and can expect to wait 5–7 years, or more.
