= Clanton Park (Charlotte, North Carolina) =

Park in North Carolina, US

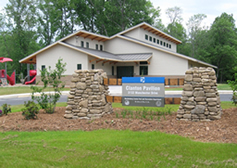
- Interactive map of Clanton Park
- Type: Public park
- Location: Charlotte, North Carolina
- Coordinates: 35.2071°N 80.8918°W
- Area: 77 acres (31 ha)
- Operator: Mecklenburg County Parks and Recreation
- Website: Clanton Park

Clanton Park is a 77-acre urban park at 1520 Clanton Road in the West Boulevard neighborhood of Charlotte, North Carolina. It features playgrounds, fields for soccer and softball, eleven basketball courts, picnic shelters, and a gazebo. The park also manages the nearby Clanton community pavilion, a 4,500 square foot indoor facility at 3132 Manchester Avenue. A half-mile section of the Irwin Creek Greenway runs through Clanton Park.

== Arbor Glen Outreach Center ==
Located in Clanton Park is the Arbor Glen Outreach Center. This facility, which contains classrooms and a gymnasium, sponsors programs for pre-schoolers, children, teens, adults, and seniors. Activities include sports, fitness, self-defense, dance, tutoring, cultural arts, and community meetings. The center hosts the Boys To Men Foundation, a mentoring program for at-risk youth, a 4-H club, and meetings of National Night Out, a community-police awareness-raising event.
