= Highland Creek (Charlotte neighborhood) =

Coordinates: 35.381004°N 80.767475°W

- Interactive map of Highland Creek
- Country: United States
- State: North Carolina
- County: Mecklenburg and Cabarrus
- Time zone: UTC-5 (Eastern (EST))
  - Summer (DST): UTC-4 (EDT)
- ZIP code: 28269
- Area code: 704/980

Highland Creek is a subdivision located in the cities of Charlotte and Concord, North Carolina.

== Golf course ==
Highland Creek Golf Club

The development was built around an 18-hole championship golf course. Spread throughout the course are five lakes creating water features for 18 holes. The course was rated one of Charlotte's hardest in 2014.

== Recreation and amenities ==
In the local area there are swimming pools, a sports club, tennis, basketball and volleyball courts, as well as a park used for outdoor movies in the spring and summer.

Highland Creek employs a private security firm (Weiser) and off-duty police officers to patrol the subdivision.

== Education ==
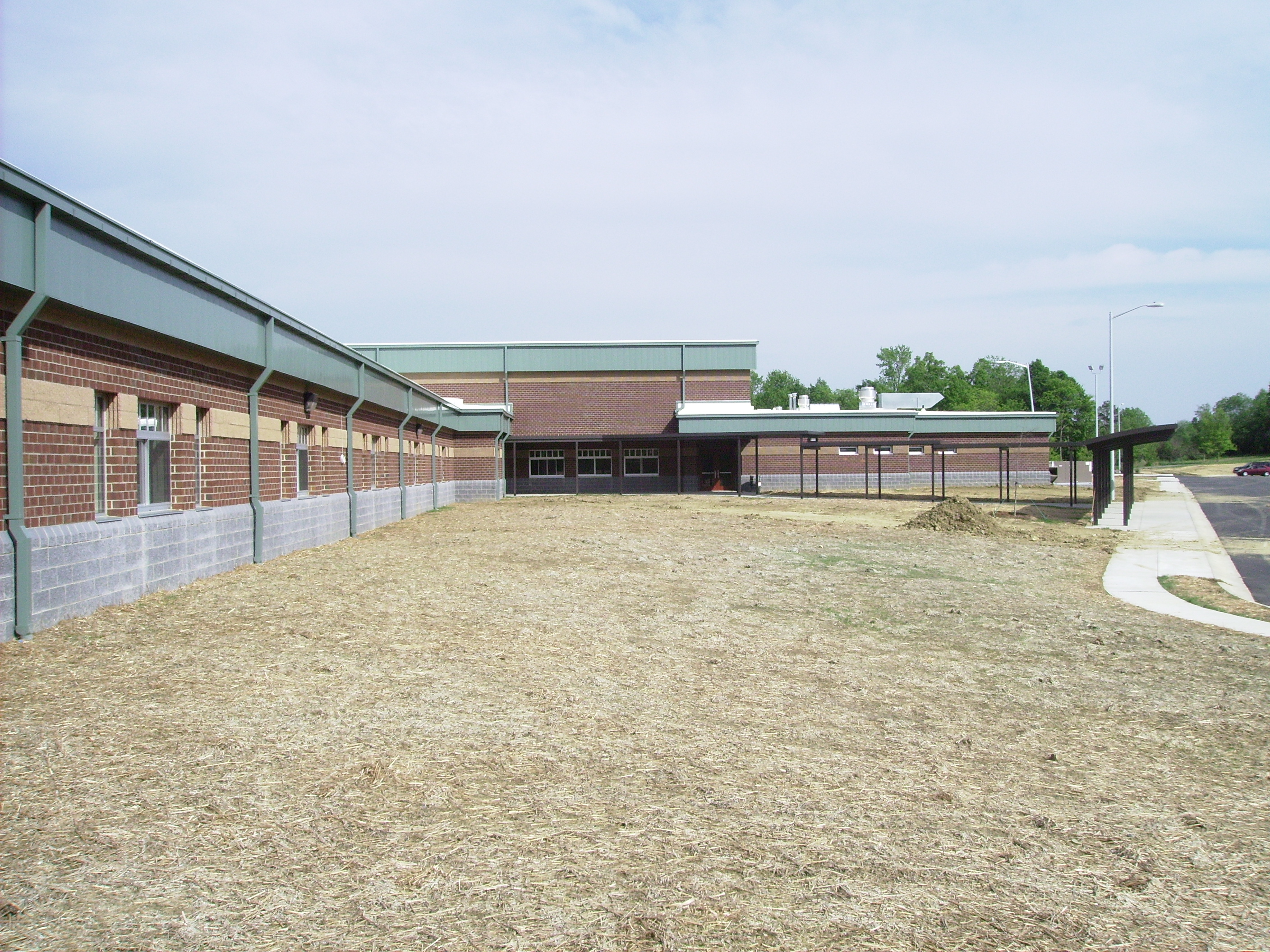
Highland Creek Elementary School, Spring 2006. The school was completed in June 2006 and opened for the 2006-2007 school year.

Highland Creek Elementary School houses 1,154 students in grades K-5 with a before and after school program to provide care for the Highland Creek community. The facility includes 51.7 acres (209,000 m^{2}) of land.

The Highland Creek Hurricanes

Mallard Creek High School, located at 3825 Johnston Oehler Road in Charlotte, serves the Highland Creek area. The school opened in the 2007-2008 school year. It houses about 2000 students.

Cox Mill High School services students living in the Cabarrus County portion of Highland Creek. It was opened in the 2009-2010 school year.

In summer 2009, Ridge Road Middle School opened to students. The middle school was constructed adjacent to the elementary school, with the construction costs totaled around $15.4 million. The two-story school has 54 classrooms and spans 130,156 square feet (12,091.9 m^{2}).

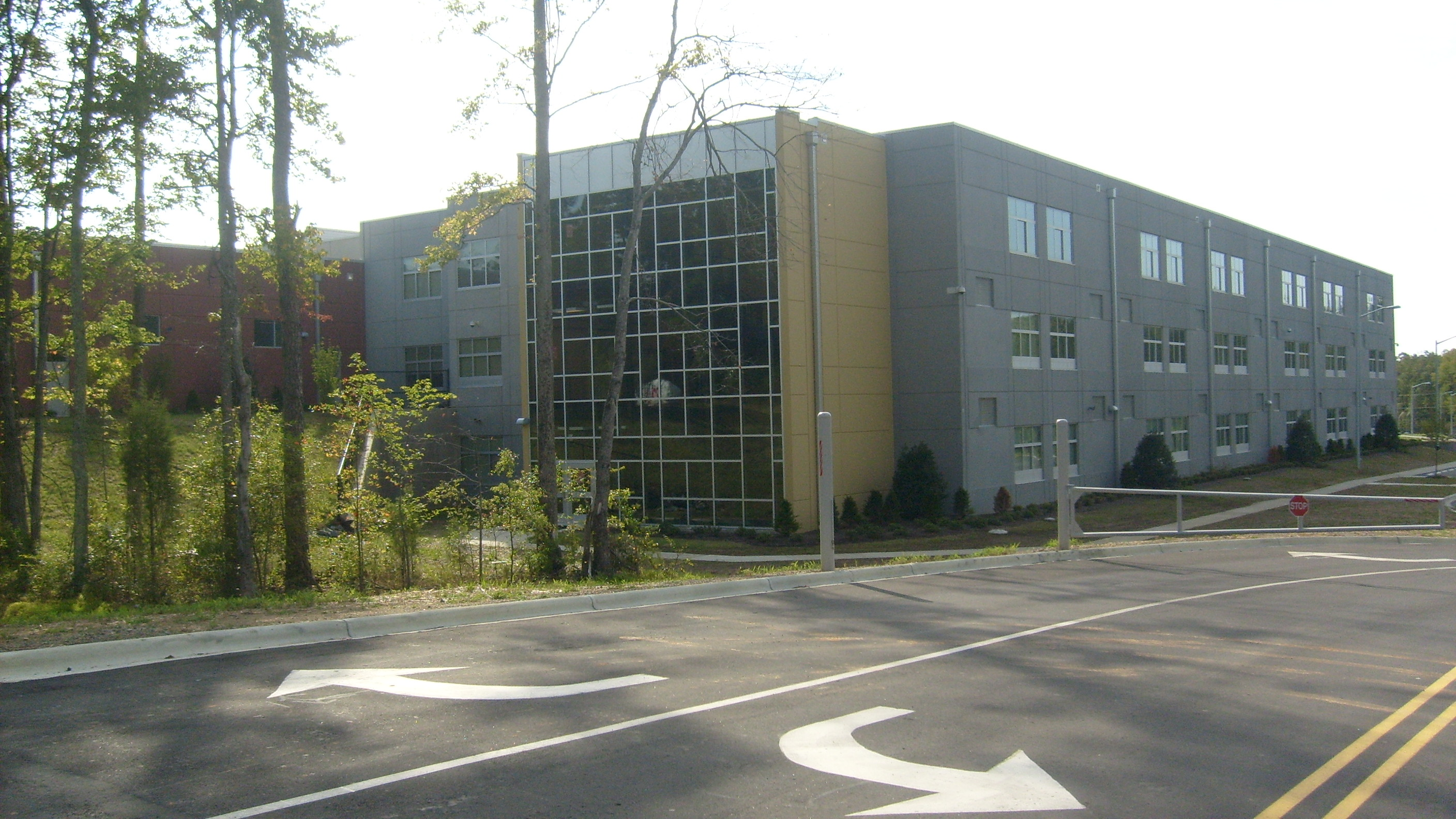
Mallard Creek High School

The Mascot: Mavericks

Mallard Creek High School Football/Soccer Field

== Surrounding area ==
Highland Creek is in a section of Charlotte called the "University Area." The University of North Carolina at Charlotte is about 10 miles (16 km) from the subdivision. Many university employees live in Highland Creek. The UNC Charlotte campus is the fourth largest campus in the Carolina system with over 21,500 students.

The city of Concord completed the annexation of its portion of Highland Creek in June 2007.

Charlotte Motor Speedway is about 5 miles (8.0 km) away. Concord Mills Mall is about 2 miles (3.2 km) from Highland Creek.

Uptown Charlotte is about a 25-minute drive South from Highland Creek. Many residents commute South to work at such businesses as Duke Energy and Bank of America each of which is headquartered in Charlotte. Wells Fargo, which purchased Wachovia in 2008, remains one of the city's largest employers. The local area is also home to the Southern campus of TIAA CREF.

The Appalachian Mountains are about a two-hour drive West, and Myrtle Beach is approximately four hours Southeast.

== Transportation ==
Highland Creek lies between two major interstate highways, I-85 and I-77. It is also located just outside the 485 loop, which circles Charlotte and connects to both I-85 and I-77.

The community is located just west of Concord Regional Airport, with a 7,400-foot (2,300 m) runway. It is also convenient to Charlotte/Douglas International Airport, with service by many major domestic and international airlines.
