= Sherwood Forest (Charlotte neighborhood) =

Coordinates: 35.171°N 80.783°W

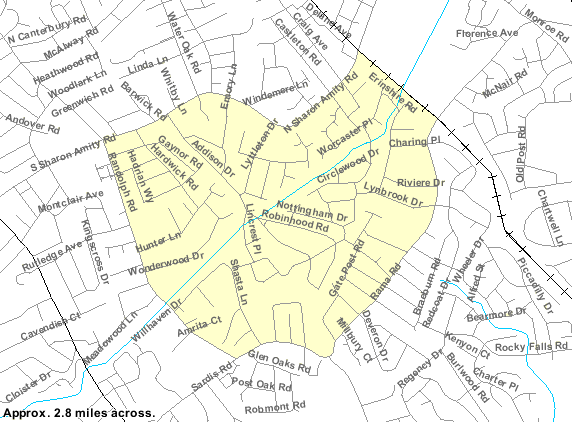
- Country: United States
- State: North Carolina
- County: Mecklenburg
- City: Charlotte

Area
  - Total: 1.906 sq mi (4.937 km^{2})

Population (March 16, 2008)
  - Total: 1,381
- according to Zillow.com
- Zip Code: 28211

The Sherwood Forest neighborhood of Charlotte, North Carolina was established in the 1950s. In addition to the Sherwood Forest subdivision, the area also includes the Castleton Gardens and Charlestowne Manor subdivisions. The area is bisected by McMullen Creek and is bounded by Sardis Road to the south, Rama Road to the southeast, and by the former Seaboard Air Line Railroad, now CSXT to the northeast, Sharon Amity Road to the north, and Randolph Road to the west. Sherwood Forest is also neighbored by the areas known as East Forest, Stonehaven, Landsdowne, Providence Park, and Cotswold. The area's dominant architectural style is the ranch-style house with brick or wood exterior. In keeping with its namesake, some of the area's street names (such as Nottingham Dr. and Robinhood Rd.) are attributed to characters and places in the Robin Hood stories.

== Education ==
The neighborhood's public schools are served by Charlotte-Mecklenburg Schools. The neighborhood is primarily zoned for Myers Park High School, with southeastern sections of the neighborhood zoned for East Mecklenburg High School. The neighborhood is also zoned for McClintock Middle School and Alexander Graham Middle School, with Cotswold Elementary School and Rama Road Elementary School serving the neighborhood as well.

Adventist Christian Academy is located on Emory Lane in Sherwood Forest.
