= Stonehaven (Charlotte neighborhood) =

Coordinates: 35.1682004°N 80.7797925°W

- Interactive map of Stonehaven
- Country: United States
- State: North Carolina
- County: Mecklenburg
- City: Charlotte
- Founder: McArn and Gwynn Co.

Area
  - Total: 3.015 sq mi (7.809 km^{2})

Population (2009)
  - Total: 6,358
- according to City-Data.com
- ZIP code: 28211, 28270
- Area codes: 704, 980

The Stonehaven neighborhood of Charlotte, North Carolina was established in the 1950s. In addition to the Stonehaven subdivision, the area also includes the Olde Stonehaven, Queens Grant, Rama Woods, Waverly Hall and Medearis subdivisions. The neighborhood is bounded by Rama Road to the northwest, Sardis Road to the southwest, McAlpine Creek to the southeast and a railroad track and Monroe Road to the northeast. The area is neighbored by the areas known as Sherwood Forest, Landsdowne, McClintock Woods, and Sardis Woods. The area's dominant architectural style is the ranch-style house with brick or wood exterior.

== Education ==
The neighborhood's public schools are served by Charlotte-Mecklenburg Schools. The neighborhood is zoned for East Mecklenburg High School, McClintock Middle School and Rama Road Elementary. The neighborhood is also home to two private schools, Charlotte Christian School and Charlotte Preparatory School. Providence Day School is located just across Sardis Rd. from the neighborhood.
