= List of Lynx light rail stations =

The LYNX rail system in Charlotte, North Carolina, US comprises 43 stations on two lines, the Blue Line and the Gold Line. The Blue Line is a light rail line connecting Uptown Charlotte to Pineville and the University of North Carolina Charlotte campus. The Gold Line is a streetcar line within Uptown Charlotte.

== Stations ==
Station	Line	Location	Opened	Reference
3rd Street/Convention Center	Lynx Blue Line	305 East Third Street	November 24, 2007	
7th Street	Lynx Blue Line	260 East Seventh Street	November 24, 2007	
8th Street	CityLynx Gold Line	499 Hawthorne Lane	August 30, 2021	
9th Street	Lynx Blue Line	237 East Ninth Street	March 16, 2018	
25th Street	Lynx Blue Line	2227 North Brevard Street	March 16, 2018	
36th Street	Lynx Blue Line	434 East 36th Street	March 16, 2018	
Archdale	Lynx Blue Line	6230 South Boulevard	November 24, 2007	
Arrowood	Lynx Blue Line	7717 England Street	November 24, 2007	
Bland Street	Lynx Blue Line	1511 Camden Road	November 24, 2007	
Brooklyn Village	Lynx Blue Line	260 East Brooklyn Village Avenue	November 24, 2007	
Bruns Avenue	CityLynx Gold Line	1704 West Trade Street	August 30, 2021	
Carson	Lynx Blue Line	218 East Carson Boulevard	November 24, 2007	
Charlotte Gateway Station	CityLynx Gold Line	601 West Trade Street	August 30, 2021	
Charlotte Transportation Center; CTC/Arena (Gold Line)	Lynx Blue Line CityLynx Gold Line	310 East Trade Street	November 24, 2007	
CPCC	CityLynx Gold Line	1160–1205 Elizabeth Avenue	July 14, 2015	
Davidson Street	CityLynx Gold Line	604 East Trade Street	July 14, 2015	
East/West Boulevard	Lynx Blue Line	1821 Camden Road	November 24, 2007	
Elizabeth & Hawthorne	CityLynx Gold Line	1617 Elizabeth Avenue	July 14, 2015	
French Street	CityLynx Gold Line	402 Beatties Ford Road	August 30, 2021	
Hawthorne & 5th Street	CityLynx Gold Line	226 Hawthorne Lane	July 14, 2015	
I-485/South Boulevard	Lynx Blue Line	9508 South Boulevard	November 24, 2007	
Irwin Avenue	CityLynx Gold Line	1007–1009 West Trade Street	August 30, 2021	
Johnson & Wales University	CityLynx Gold Line	839 West Trade Street	August 30, 2021	
Johnson C. Smith University	CityLynx Gold Line	162 Beatties Ford Road	August 30, 2021	
JW Clay Boulevard/UNC Charlotte	Lynx Blue Line	9048 North Tryon Street	March 16, 2018	
McCullough	Lynx Blue Line	8312 North Tryon Street	March 16, 2018	
McDowell Street	CityLynx Gold Line	806 East Trade Street	July 14, 2015	
Mint Street	CityLynx Gold Line	419 West Trade Street	August 30, 2021	
New Bern	Lynx Blue Line	129 New Bern Street	November 24, 2007	
Old Concord Road	Lynx Blue Line	5442 North Tryon Street	March 16, 2018	
Parkwood	Lynx Blue Line	327 Parkwood Avenue	March 16, 2018	
Scaleybark	Lynx Blue Line	3750 South Boulevard	November 24, 2007	
Sharon Road West	Lynx Blue Line	8815 Crump Road	November 24, 2007	
Sugar Creek	Lynx Blue Line	644 East Sugar Creek Road	March 16, 2018	
Sunnyside Avenue	CityLynx Gold Line	799 Hawthorne Lane	August 30, 2021	
Tom Hunter	Lynx Blue Line	6505 North Tryon Street	March 16, 2018	
Tryon Street	CityLynx Gold Line	103 West Trade Street	August 30, 2021	
Tyvola	Lynx Blue Line	5703 Old Pineville Road	November 24, 2007	
UNC Charlotte–Main	Lynx Blue Line	9025 Cameron Boulevard	March 16, 2018	
University City Boulevard	Lynx Blue Line	7205 North Tryon Street	March 16, 2018	
Wesley Heights	CityLynx Gold Line	1514 West Trade Street	August 30, 2021	
Woodlawn	Lynx Blue Line	4756 Old Pineville Road	November 24, 2007	
