= Hawthorne & 5th Street station =

Streetcar station in Charlotte, North Carolina, USA

Hawthorne & 5th Street
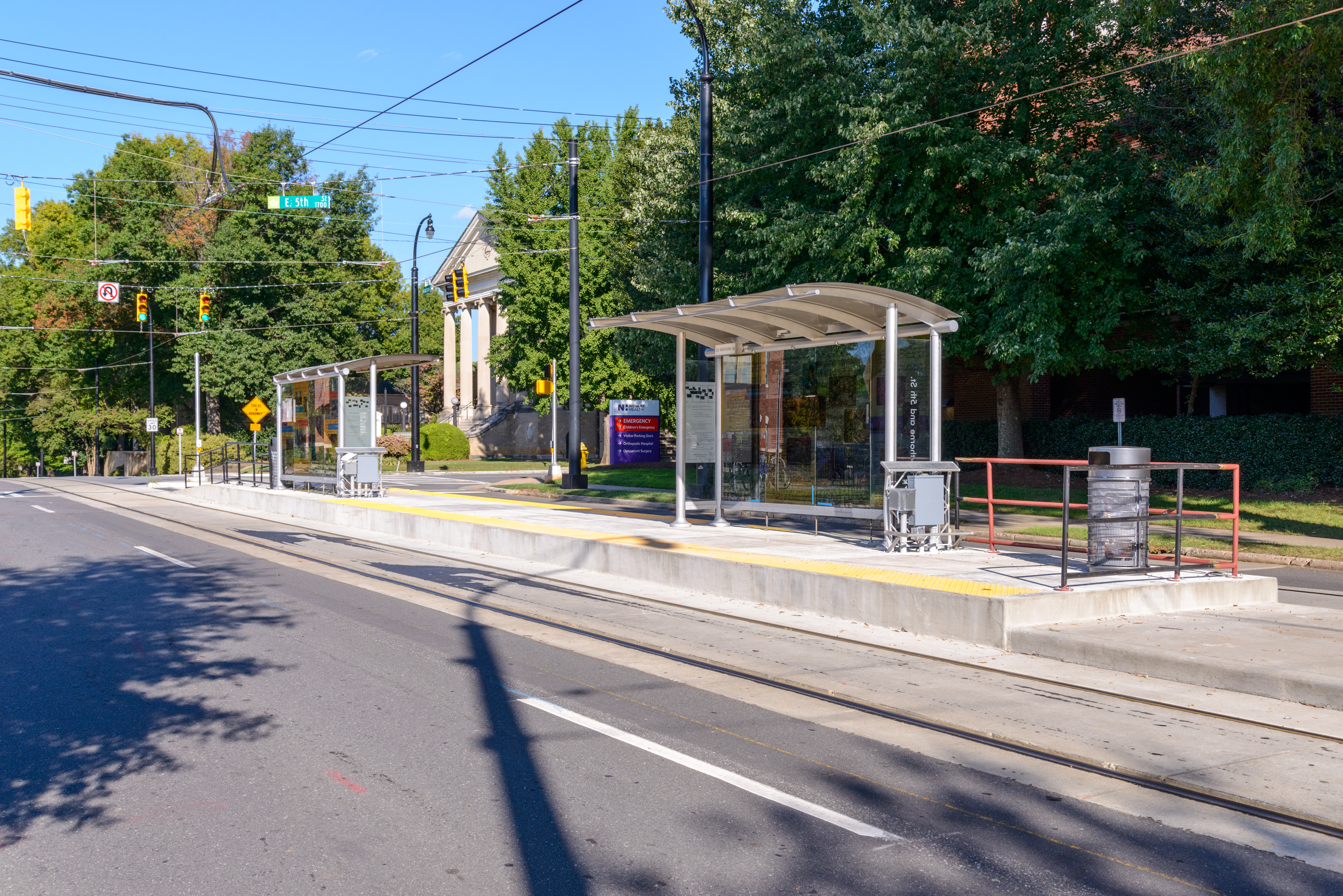
- Streetcar stop along Hawthorne Lane

General information
- Location: 226 Hawthorne Lane; Charlotte, North Carolina; United States
- Coordinates: 35.2137104°N 80.8245482°W
- Owner: Charlotte Area Transit System
- Platforms: 1 island platform
- Tracks: 2

Construction
- Structure type: At-grade
- Cycle facilities: Bicycle racks
- Accessible: yes

History
- Opened: July 14, 2015

Services
Preceding station	CATS	Following station
Elizabeth & Hawthorne toward French Street	CityLynx Gold Line	8th Street toward Sunnyside Avenue
Location

Hawthorne & 5th Street is a streetcar station in Charlotte, North Carolina. The at-grade island platform on Hawthorne Lane is a stop along the CityLynx Gold Line and serves Novant Health Presbyterian Medical Center and the Elizabeth neighborhood.

== Location ==
Hawthorne & 5th Street station is located at the intersection of Hawthorne Lane and 5th Street, in Elizabeth. It directly serves Novant Health Presbyterian Medical Center and is one block southwest of Independence Park.

== History ==
As part of the initial 1.5-mile (2.4 km) Gold Line, construction on Hawthorne & 5th Street began in December 2013. The station opened to the public on July 14, 2015, with a low platform configuration that was used for heritage streetcars. In June 2019, as part of phase two, streetcar service was replaced by the CityLynx Connector bus; at which time the station's island platform was closed off so it can be raised to accommodate the level boarding for modern streetcar vehicles. Though it was slated to reopen in early-2020, various delays pushed out the reopening till mid-2021. The station reopened to the public on August 30, 2021, at which time the CityLynx Connector bus was discontinued.

== Station layout ==
The station consists of an island platform with two passenger shelters; a crosswalk and ramp provide platform access from Hawthorne Lane. The station's passenger shelters house two art installations by Nancy O’Neil. The windscreens considers Charlotte's first public park and a hospital with an educational history, featuring a collage of historical maps, photos, and manuscripts on glass.
