= 8th Street station (Charlotte) =

Streetcar station in Charlotte

8th Street
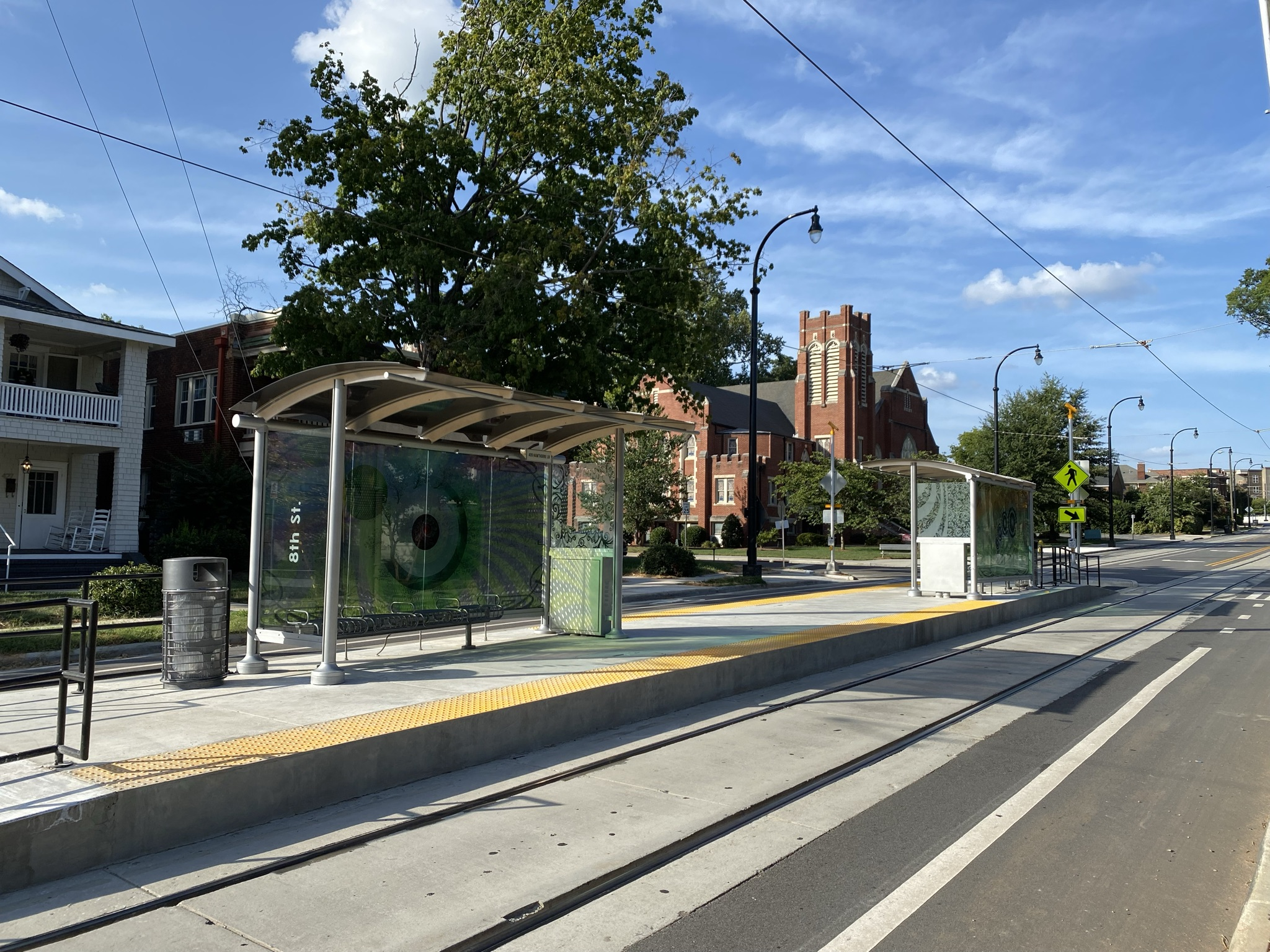
- Platform and shelters at 8th Street station

General information
- Location: 499 Hawthorne Lane; Charlotte, North Carolina; United States
- Coordinates: 35.216409°N 80.821311°W
- Owner: Charlotte Area Transit System
- Platforms: 1 island platform
- Tracks: 2

Construction
- Structure type: At-grade
- Cycle facilities: Bicycle racks
- Accessible: yes

History
- Opened: August 30, 2021

Services
Preceding station	CATS	Following station
Hawthorne & 5th Street toward French Street	CityLynx Gold Line	Sunnyside Avenue Terminus
Location

8th Street is a streetcar station in Charlotte, North Carolina. The at-grade island platform on Hawthorne Lane is a stop along the CityLynx Gold Line, serving the Elizabeth neighborhood.

== Location ==
8th Street station is located at the intersection of Hawthorne Lane and 8th Street, in Elizabeth. The immediate area is a mix of single-family homes and multifamily residential. One block southwest is Independence Park and various shops and businesses along 7th Street.

== History ==
8th Street station was approved as a Gold Line Phase 2 stop in 2013, with construction beginning in Fall 2016. Though it was slated to open in early-2020, various delays pushed out the opening till mid-2021. The station opened to the public on August 30, 2021.

== Station layout ==
The station consists of an island platform with two passenger shelters; a crosswalk and ramp provide platform access from Hawthorne Lane. The station's passenger shelters house two art installations by Taiwanese–American artist Amy Cheng. Each World Within Worlds panel features a lace-like pattern etched into the glass. They are deliberately more abstract than works of art at other Gold Line stations and are meant to evoke the quieter aspects of the Elizabeth residential neighborhood.
