= CityLynx Gold Line =

Streetcar line in Charlotte, North Carolina, US

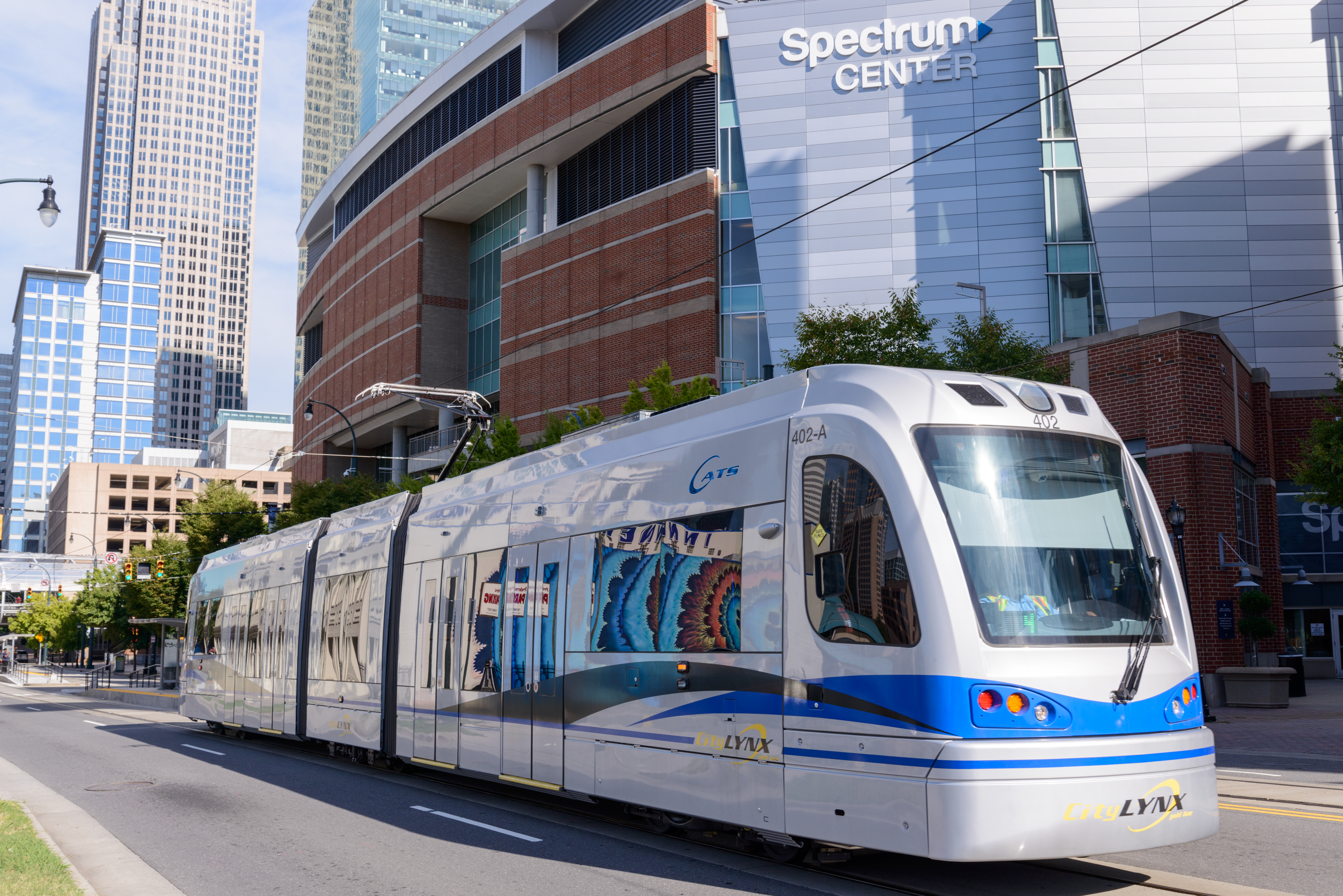
- Streetcar 402 passing by the Spectrum Center

Overview
- Status: Operational
- Owner: Charlotte Area Transit System
- Locale: Charlotte, North Carolina
- Termini: French Street (west); Sunnyside Avenue (east)
- Stations: 17 (18 planned)

Service
- Type: Streetcar
- System: Charlotte Area Transit System
- Operator: Charlotte Area Transit System
- Rolling stock: Siemens S700
- Daily ridership: 2,008 (December 2024)

History
- Work began: December 12, 2012
- Opened: July 14, 2015
- 2nd Phase: August 30, 2021
- 3rd Phase: 2033 (planned)

Technical
- Line length: 4.0 mi (6.4 km) (built); 10.0 mi (16.1 km) (planned)
- Number of tracks: 2
- Character: Street running
- Track gauge: 4 ft 8 1/2 in (1,435 mm) standard gauge
- Electrification: Overhead line, 750 V DC
- Highest elevation: 758 ft (231 m)
Route map
CityLynx Gold Line highlighted in gold

The CityLynx Gold Line is a streetcar line in Charlotte, North Carolina. A component of the Charlotte Area Transit System's Lynx rail system, it follows a primarily east-west path along Beatties Ford Road, Trade Street and Central Avenue through central Charlotte. The initial 1.5-mile (2.4 km), six-stop segment (Phase 1) between Time Warner Cable Arena (now Spectrum Center) and Presbyterian Hospital opened for service on July 14, 2015. A further 2.5-mile (4.0 km) segment (Phase 2) from the Charlotte Transportation Center to French Street, and from Hawthorne & 5th Street to Sunnyside Avenue, opened for service on August 30, 2021.

The third and final phase, comprising extensions between Hawthorne Lane and Eastland CTC, and from French Street to Rosa Parks CTC, has been planned, but lacks funding. Originally projected to be 10 miles (16 km) long with 35 stops, the Gold Line when fully completed is intended to connect the University Park area of west Charlotte with Eastland Community Transit Center in east Charlotte via Uptown Charlotte.

== History ==
=== Initial plans ===
In 1994, the City of Charlotte and Mecklenburg County jointly approved a "Centers and Corridors Vision", a comprehensive plan which focused future regional development along five major transport corridors. In support of this plan, a "2025 Integrated Transit/Land Use Plan" in 1998 reviewed transit options for five transportation corridors in the Charlotte metro area, including the Center City corridor. Voters approved a half-cent sales and use tax to support the plan in November 1998. In November 2002, the Charlotte city council adopted the "2025 Transit Plan", which selected a streetcar as the preferred transit option for the Center City corridor.

As originally conceived, the plan envisioned a single streetcar line, the "Trade Street Streetcar", linking Presbyterian Hospital (eastern portion of the line) and Johnson C. Smith University (western portion), with three subsequent extensions:

- A Central Avenue extension from the Presbyterian Hospital end of Elizabeth Avenue (a continuation of Trade Street) to the vicinity of Eastland Mall, running along Central Avenue for most of the route
- A Beatties Ford Road extension from the vicinity of Johnson C. Smith University, continuing along Trade Street and Beatties Ford Road to near I-85.
- A Downtown Streetcar Loop following a route "defined as some combination of 11th Street, 10th Street, 9th Street, 8th Street or 7th Street on the north side, McDowell Street or Davidson Street on the east side, Stonewall Street or Second Street on the south side, and Graham Street, Mint Street or Pine/Poplar Streets on the west side."

In June 2006 initial costs for the completion of the Center City Corridor streetcar line were roughly estimated at $250 million. The line was then intended to replace the No. 7 and No. 9 CATS bus routes serving Beatties Ford Road and Central Avenue, respectively. With cost and ridership projection estimates made, the Metropolitan Transit Commission (MTC) voted on the priority for its construction in November 2006. At its November meeting the MTC voted to prioritize the construction and completion of both the Blue Line Extension to UNC Charlotte and the Red Line commuter rail to Lake Norman, with the Central City streetcar coming third. At the same time, the MTC determined that initial engineering studies for the corridor would commence in 2013 with a phased completion by 2023. Although construction was not slated to commence until the mid-2010s, streetcar tracks were installed as part of a streetscape project along the Elizabeth Avenue segment between CPCC and Presbyterian Hospital, to be complete by 2009.

Although the streetcar line had been given third priority by the MTC, by 2008 CATS began to determine means to speed up its construction and have it operational by 2013. To further expedite the project, in May 2008, the Charlotte City Council approved $500,000 to study the corridor in terms of an updated cost estimate, economic benefits and the eligibility of the corridor for federal funding. To complete the line by 2013, however, CATS stated that additional capital would be required as other projects had already been budgeted for and were in progress.

In the spring of 2010, the Federal Transit Administration awarded the project a $25 million grant. On September 19, 2011, U.S. Transportation Secretary Ray LaHood formally awarded Charlotte the grant for a 1.5-mile (2.4 km) starter streetcar line from Time Warner Cable Arena to Presbyterian Hospital. Construction began in December 2012, with the line expected to open for service in 2015. Total costs were estimated at $37 million, with the city paying $12 million; however, the city did not then state how it would pay for an estimated $1.5 million in operating costs.

=== Construction and opening of Phase 1 ===
In November 2012, the Charlotte city council awarded a $26.3 million contract for construction of the starter segment to a partnership between Balfour Beatty Rail and Blythe Development Company. The groundbreaking for the initial segment took place on December 12, 2012, in front of Presbyterian Hospital, with Secretary of Transportation Ray LaHood, Mayor Foxx and other officials in attendance. By May 2014, Phase 1 was 45 percent complete.

While the starter line had originally been scheduled to open in March 2015, in January 2015 the opening date was moved to June due to construction errors on the part of the contractor, with a subsequent postponement to July 2015. On July 14, 2015, the Phase 1 section of the Gold Line began service. U.S. Secretary of Transportation and former Charlotte mayor Anthony Foxx, a primary backer of the project, delivered the keynote speech.

=== Phase 2 ===
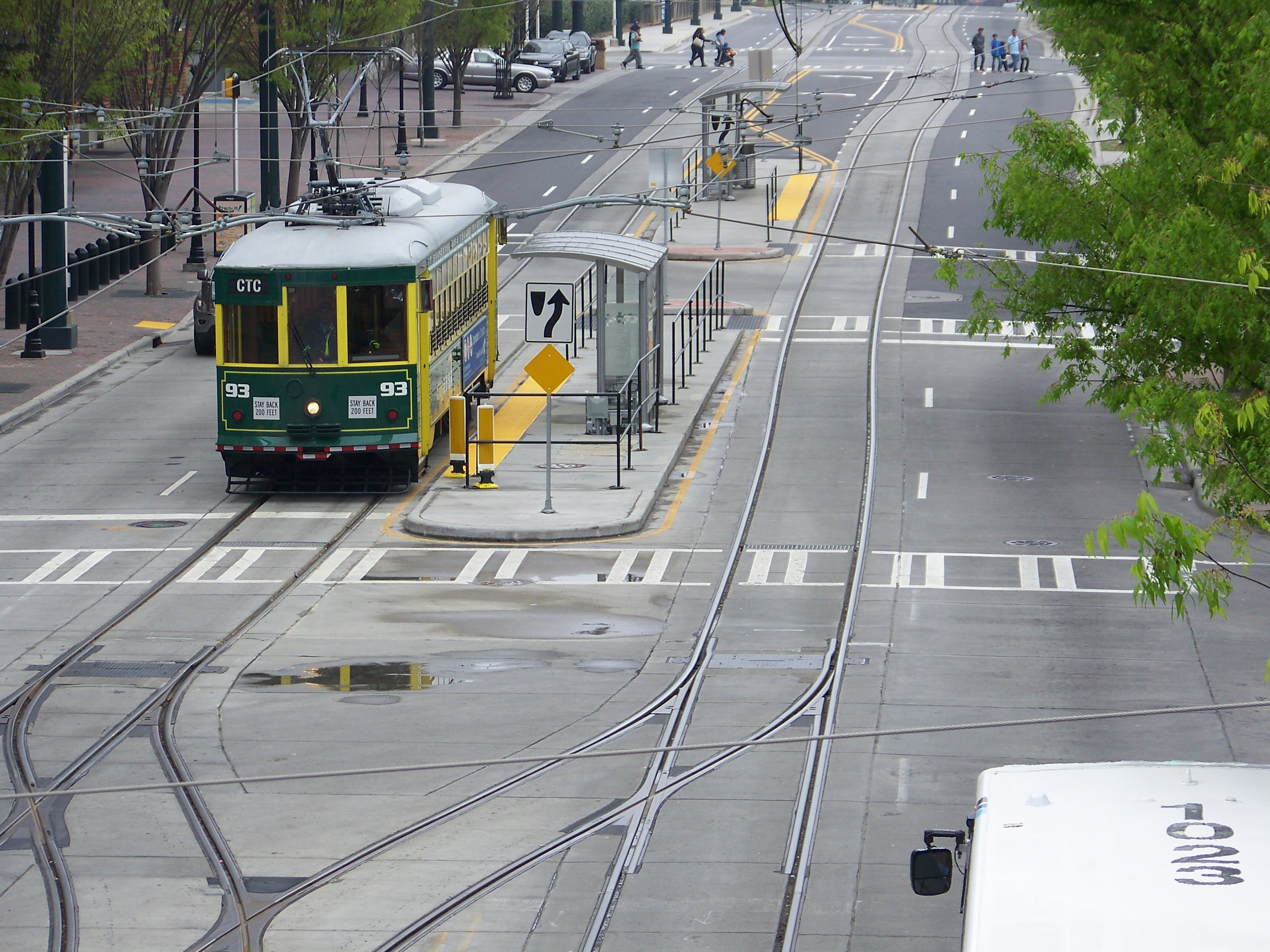
A Birney-replica streetcar which temporarily provided Gold Line service until 2019, seen at the CTC stop on Trade Street

==== Planning (2012–2014) ====
In early 2012, Mayor Anthony Foxx proposed building the next stage of the streetcar line, a 2.5-mile (4.0 km), $119 million segment which would extend the line to Johnson C. Smith University. The proposal was turned down by a majority of the city council; on June 30, Foxx vetoed a revised city budget by the council which would have eliminated the second phase. On October 30, further discussion failed to reach any consensus on how best to pay for its construction. Options considered included: charging fares for the streetcar (the city had planned for the streetcar to be free), increasing the special property tax rate charged to property owners inside Interstate 277, soliciting donations from businesses and institutions along the line, such as Johnson & Wales University, or using a portion of new property taxes created from development along the line. Other options to raise funds, which would have required approval from the state, included: increasing the rental car tax, hotel/motel tax or prepared food and beverage tax, levying a special fee on parking spaces or lobbying for a higher vehicle registration fee.

Many city council members stated they did not favor an increase in property taxes to build the segment. In an effort to end the continuing deadlock, on December 10 Foxx proposed two alternative budgets, the smaller of which would eliminate the streetcar extension; however, on December 17 the city council voted to postpone all budget decisions until early 2013. At a meeting in Raleigh on January 31, 2013, Pat McCrory, the newly elected Governor of North Carolina and former mayor of Charlotte, told Charlotte's city attorney and its deputy city manager Ron Carlee that state funding for the Blue Line Extension could be at risk if Charlotte persisted with plans to build an extension to the streetcar line. On April 10, 2013, the project was temporarily dropped from the budget, though Carlee hoped to have a separate streetcar plan ready to vote on by June 2013.

After protracted debate, on May 13, 2013, Ron Carlee, the new Charlotte city manager, said the $126 million extension to what had been renamed the CityLynx Gold Line could be funded without a property tax increase if the city could receive a federal grant for half the estimated cost, possibly through the Federal Transit Administration's New Starts Program. The remaining $63 million could be covered with surplus funds from other city programs. City council members voted to send the proposal to the Metropolitan Transit Commission on May 22, and with their approval, take a vote on May 28. On May 15, 2013, Bay Area Economics, an independent consultant hired by the city in 2009 to conduct a streetcar economic impact study, reported the proposed second phase could generate 1,100,000 square feet (102,193 m^{2}) of new development for the city by 2035, and nearly $2.4 million in new property taxes. On May 28, the Charlotte city council voted 7-4 to build the Phase 2 extension, setting aside $63 million for the purpose; the new segment would extend from Sunnyside Avenue to French Street. On September 3, it was reported the Gold Line extension had been passed over for a federal TIGER (Transportation Investment Generating Economic Recovery) grant, intended to cover the remaining $63 million it would cost to build the line. On November 13, the city announced it would apply to the Federal Transit Administration for permission to begin planning the line in detail.

==== Design (2014–2017) ====
On January 27, 2014, the Charlotte city council voted 8–3 to spend up to $12 million on engineering work for the extension. Carlee said the city would have to spend some of the $63 million it had allocated for the extension in May to demonstrate to the FTA that the project was viable. On February 26, the FTA issued its approval for CATS to begin project development for the extension and to apply for the Federal Small Starts grant in September 2014. On September 8, 2014, the Charlotte city council voted 7–4 to build the second phase and proceed with applying for the federal grant. As part of the extension project, the Hawthorne Lane bridge over Independence Boulevard would be replaced to handle the weight of the streetcars.

On June 22, 2015, the Charlotte city council voted 7–4 to approve $7.7 million for further Phase 2 design work. The initial request for construction bids returned two bids in July 2016 that came in over budget, leading CATS to request a second round of bidding the following month. In November 2016, Siemens Mobility was awarded a $40 million contract for low-floor streetcars and associated parts to service the entire Gold Line route. On November 28, the council awarded a $94 million construction contract to Johnson Bros. Corporation to build the 2.5 miles (4.0 km) of trackage in Phase 2, as well as associated road and landscaping work.

==== Construction (2017–2021) ====
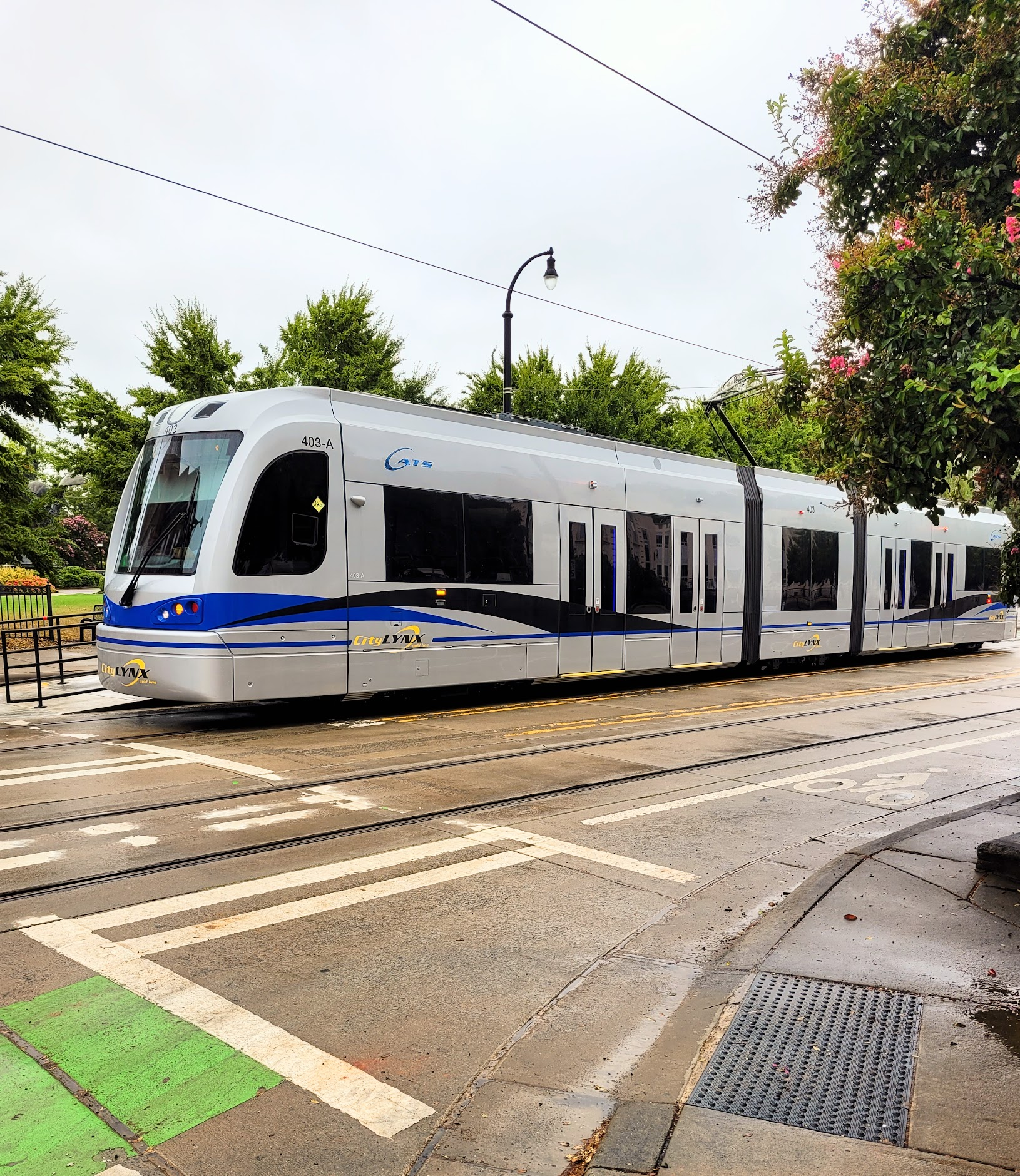
Streetcar No. 403 at the CPCC station in September 2021

Construction began with a groundbreaking ceremony on January 14, 2017, with completion required by August 31, 2020, under the terms of the federal funding used. Starting on June 3, 2019; CATS replaced streetcar service along the line with a shuttle bus in order to facilitate construction of Phase 2 and increase the heights of the existing stations by a few inches to accommodate the new Siemens streetcars. Streetcar service was initially slated to resume in 2020, but was pushed back to 2021 to accommodate the 2020 Republican National Convention. Supply shortages, a contractor ordering the wrong girders for the Hawthorne Lane bridge, the COVID-19 pandemic and the George Floyd protests further delayed the opening of the section. Test trains began running along the route in February 2021, with pre-revenue testing beginning from May 10. Phase 2 began service at 5:00 a.m. on August 30, 2021, with the first passengers boarding at the 8th Street stop.

== Future construction (Phase 3) ==
The third and final phase of the CityLynx Gold Line, comprising extensions between Hawthorne Lane and Eastland CTC, and from French Street to Rosa Parks CTC, has been planned, but lacks funding. This 6-mile-long (9.7 km) segment was originally scheduled for completion by 2023 at a cost of $231 million. In early April 2021, the city of Charlotte issued requests for qualifications for prospective firms to build the final phase of the Gold Line, which by then had been 30% designed. Firms were given until April 30 to apply, with final selections to be made by June 4 at the latest.

As of 2021, no cost estimates have been developed for the third phase, nor have local, state or federal funds been allocated for construction. According to John Lewis, CATS CEO, the final phase of the Gold Line will cost significantly more than the previous two phases, as the 4-mile-long (6.4 km) segment from Sunnyside Avenue near Novant Health Presbyterian Medical Center to the former Eastland Mall property near North Sharon Amity Road requires faster travel times, necessitating construction of a separate track in that area instead of having the streetcar share the road with traffic. This would make the streetcar function more like a light rail line in that stretch of rail. The remaining 2 miles (3.2 km) of track extending west from French Street near Johnson C. Smith, and running along Beatties Ford Road to the Rosa Parks Place Community Transit Center, will include new bridges over Brookshire Boulevard and I-85.

== Operation ==
=== Fares ===
The Gold Line was intended to have been fare-free until January 2022, when standard CATS fares would have been introduced. Due to ongoing COVID-19 pandemic-related workforce shortages, however, CATS officials decided to indefinitely postpone revenue service until enough rail operators were available to ensure sufficiently reliable service.

=== Hours ===
The CityLynx Gold Line operates seven days a week from 5 a.m. to 2 a.m.

=== List of stops ===
Stop	Neighborhood	Connections	Destinations
French Street	Biddleville		
Johnson C. Smith University	Biddleville	CATS: 7	Johnson C. Smith University
Bruns Avenue	Seversville		
Wesley Heights	Wesley Heights		
Irwin Avenue	Uptown Charlotte (3rd and 4th wards)		
Johnson & Wales University	Uptown Charlotte (3rd and 4th wards)		Johnson & Wales University
Charlotte Gateway Station	Uptown Charlotte (3rd and 4th wards)		
Mint Street	Uptown Charlotte (3rd and 4th wards)		Carillon Tower, Charles R. Jonas Federal Building, Old Settlers' Cemetery, Romare Bearden Park, Truist Field
Tryon Street	Uptown Charlotte	CATS: 1, 7, 8, 11, 21, 22, 26, 34	101 Independence Center, 112 Tryon Plaza, 121 West Trade, 129 West Trade, 200 South Tryon, Bank of America Corporate Center, BB&T Center, Blumenthal Performing Arts Center, Charlotte Mecklenburg Library, Discovery Place, Fifth Third Center, First Citizens Plaza, Johnston Building, One South, Thomas Polk Park, Truist Center
CTC/Arena	Uptown Charlotte (1st and 2nd wards)	Lynx: Blue; CATS: 1, 4–11, 14–17, 19–23, 26, 27, 34, 35, 40x, 46x–48x, 52x, 62x–64x, 74x, 77x, 82x, 85x	Spectrum Center
Davidson Street	Uptown Charlotte (1st and 2nd wards)	CATS: 9, 17, 23, 27	Charlotte-Mecklenburg Government Center, Federal Reserve Bank of Richmond Charlotte Branch
McDowell Street	Uptown Charlotte (1st and 2nd wards)	CATS: 9, 27	Mecklenburg County Courthouse
CPCC	Elizabeth		American Legion Memorial Stadium, Central Piedmont Community College, Grady Cole Center
Elizabeth & Hawthorne	Elizabeth		
Hawthorne & 5th Street	Elizabeth		Novant Health Presbyterian Medical Center
8th Street	Elizabeth	CATS: 27	
Sunnyside Avenue	Elizabeth	CATS: 9, 17	

== Ridership ==
In 2015, during its first month of operation, weekday ridership on the first phase of the CityLynx Gold Line exceeded initial projections, averaging 1,507 trips against an official projection of 1,100 trips. In its first year, Phase 1 averaged 1,600 weekday trips, slightly falling to an average of 1,480 weekday trips by July 2017. Ridership declined by 41.9 percent over the following year, with the line only averaging 803 weekday trips in July 2018. As of April 2019, the last month for which figures were available before service was temporarily suspended, weekday ridership averaged 687 trips. At the opening of the second phase in 2021, CATS CEO John Lewis said the daily ridership goal for the newly expanded line would be 4,100 daily trips. He expected this target would be achieved by roughly 2023 due to COVID-19-induced declines in public transit ridership. In its first full month of operation, the expanded Gold Line averaged 1,230 weekday trips. One year after it had reopened, the line averaged 1,895 weekday trips.

Per the original plan, in 2006 CATS estimated the Gold Line would have an average daily ridership of between 14,200 and 16,700 passengers when fully completed.

== Criticism ==
The CityLynx Gold Line project has been criticized for its high cost and limited projected benefits for the areas it is intended to serve, though the net benefits from future development as a result of the streetcar line are difficult to assess. Recent cost-benefit analyses have shown that at a cost of $1.58 per passenger mile (predicted for 2019), it would cost twice as much to operate as either city bus (77 cents/passenger mile, in 2012) or light rail services (68 cents/passenger mile, in 2012), while traveling over a shorter distance. Since its opening, the Gold Line streetcar has been criticized for its street running design, instead of having a dedicated right of way; this has been cited as contributing to frequent service delays.

== See also ==
- Streetcars in North America
- Light rail in the United States
