= Wesley Heights station =

Streetcar station in Charlotte

Wesley Heights
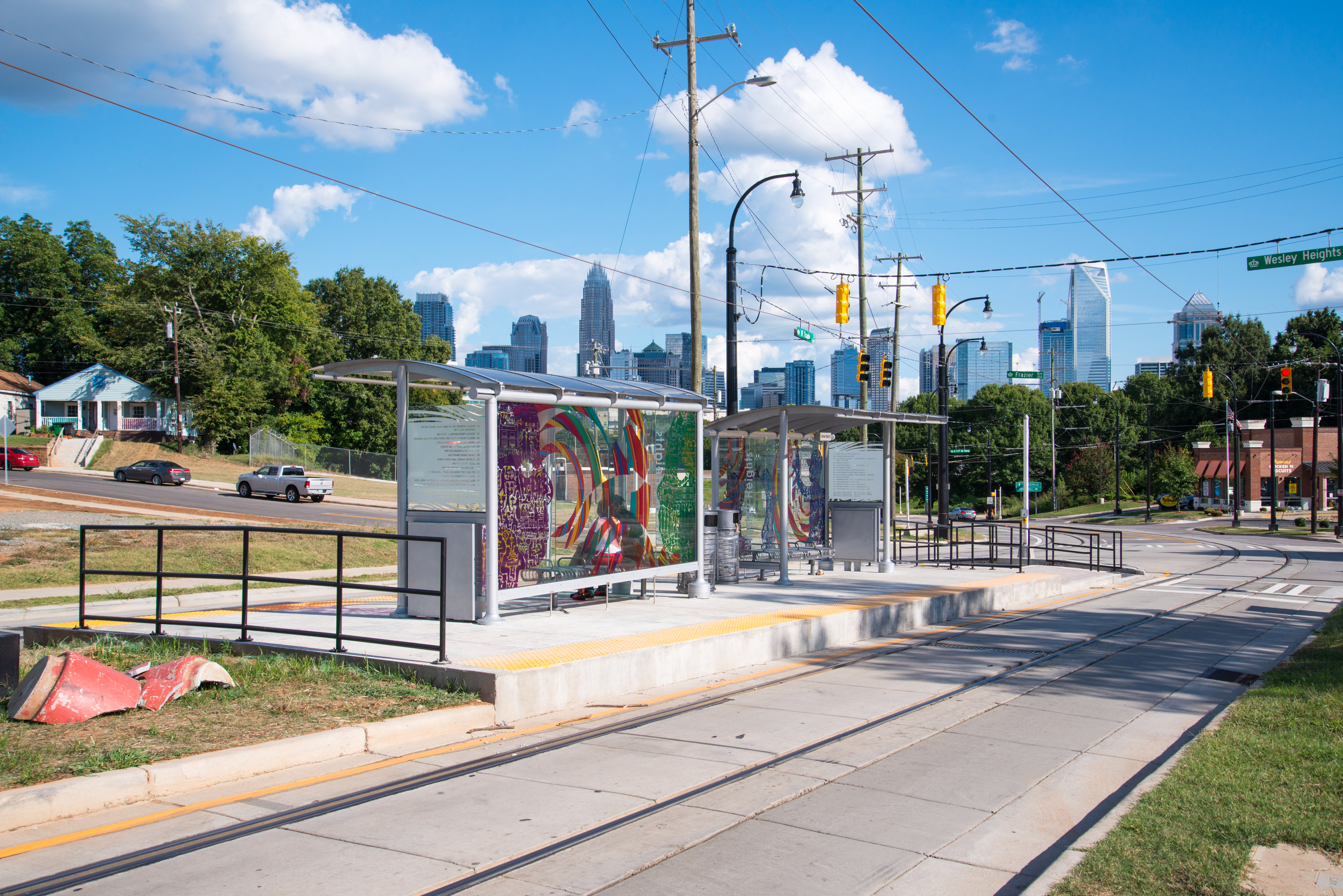
- Streetcar stop with view of Uptown Charlotte

General information
- Location: 1509 West Trade Street; Charlotte, North Carolina; United States
- Coordinates: 35.23732°N 80.85879°W
- Owner: Charlotte Area Transit System
- Platforms: 1 island platform
- Tracks: 2

Construction
- Structure type: At-grade
- Cycle facilities: Bicycle racks
- Accessible: yes

History
- Opened: August 30, 2021

Services
Preceding station	CATS	Following station
Bruns Avenue toward French Street	CityLynx Gold Line	Irwin Avenue toward Sunnyside Avenue
Location

Wesley Heights is a streetcar station in Charlotte, North Carolina. The at-grade island platform on West Trade Street is a stop along the CityLynx Gold Line, serving the Wesley Heights Historic District.

== Location ==
Wesley Heights station is located at the intersection of Frazier Avenue, Wesley Heights Way, and West Trade Street, just west of Bill Lee Freeway (I-77/US 21). The Wesley Heights neighborhood, part of West End, was developed in 1911 as a streetcar suburb and features notable examples of Bungalow / American Craftsman, Colonial Revival, and Tudor Revival style architecture.

== History ==
Wesley Heights station was approved as a Gold Line Phase 2 stop in 2013. In tandem with the project, nearby Frazier Avenue was realigned to make an intersection with Wesley Heights Way, at a cost of $1.62 million (2021 US dollars). Construction began in Fall 2016 and was slated to open in early-2020, but various delays pushed out the opening till mid-2021. The station opened to the public on August 30, 2021.

== Station layout ==
The station consists of an island platform with two passenger shelters; a crosswalk and ramp provide platform access from West Trade Street. The station's passenger shelters house two art installations by George Bates. The windscreens are titled: The Worth of That, is That Which It Contains and That is This, and This With Thee Remains. The title comes from a 1954 JCSU yearbook excerpt referencing Shakespeare's sonnet 74. The micro and macro figures and images share the specific and general history of the area.
