= Elizabeth & Hawthorne station =

Streetcar station in Charlotte, North Carolina

Elizabeth & Hawthorne
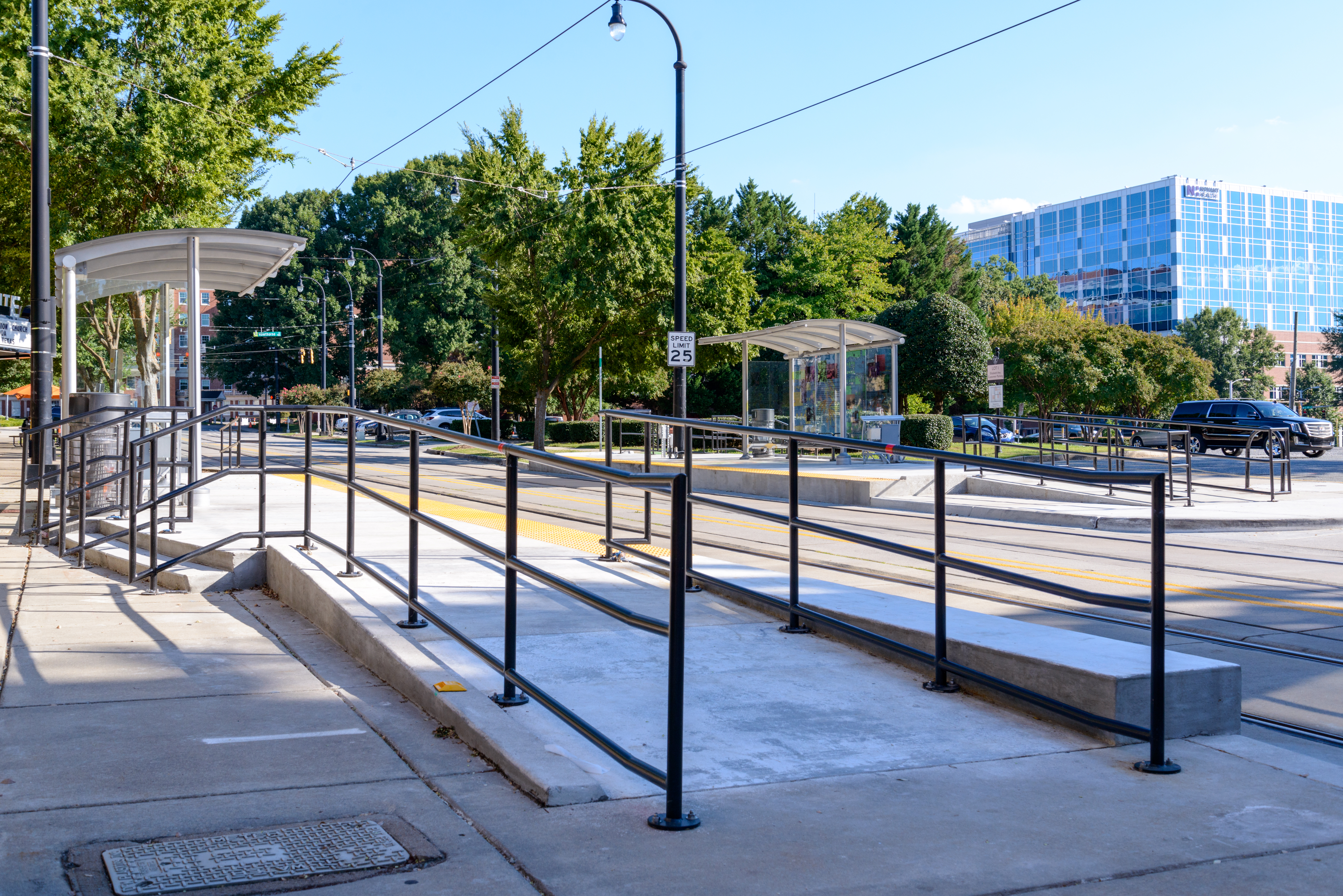

General information
- Location: 1617 Elizabeth Avenue; Charlotte, North Carolina; United States
- Coordinates: 35°12′49″N 80°49′35″W
- Owner: Charlotte Area Transit System
- Platforms: 2 side platforms
- Tracks: 2

Construction
- Structure type: At-grade
- Cycle facilities: Bicycle racks
- Accessible: yes

History
- Opened: July 14, 2015

Services
Preceding station	CATS	Following station
CPCC toward French Street	CityLynx Gold Line	Hawthorne & 5th Street toward Sunnyside Avenue
Location

Elizabeth & Hawthorne is a streetcar station in Charlotte, North Carolina. The at-grade dual side platforms on Elizabeth Avenue are a stop along the CityLynx Gold Line and serves the Elizabeth neighborhood.

== Location ==
Elizabeth & Hawthorne station is located on Elizabeth Avenue, between Travis Avenue and Hawthorne Lane, in Elizabeth. Shops and businesses are along Elizabeth Avenue, with Novant Health Presbyterian Medical Center and various stand-alone medical offices located nearby.

== History ==
As part of the initial 1.5-mile (2.4 km) Gold Line, construction on Elizabeth & Hawthorne began in December 2013. The station opened to the public on July 14, 2015, with a low platform configuration that was used for heritage streetcars. In June 2019, as part of phase two, streetcar service was replaced by the CityLynx Connector bus; at which time the station's two side platforms were closed off so they can be raised to accommodate the level boarding for modern streetcar vehicles. Though it was slated to reopen in early-2020, various delays pushed out the reopening till mid-2021. The station reopened to the public on August 30, 2021, at which time the CityLynx Connector bus was discontinued.

== Station layout ==
The station consists of two side platforms and two passenger shelters; ramps or steps provide platform access from the immediate sidewalks. The station's passenger shelters house two art installations by Nancy O’Neil. The windscreens preserves the memories of the historical suburb of Elizabeth, featuring a collage of historical maps, photos, and manuscripts on glass.
