= Irwin Avenue station =

Streetcar station in Charlotte

Irwin Avenue
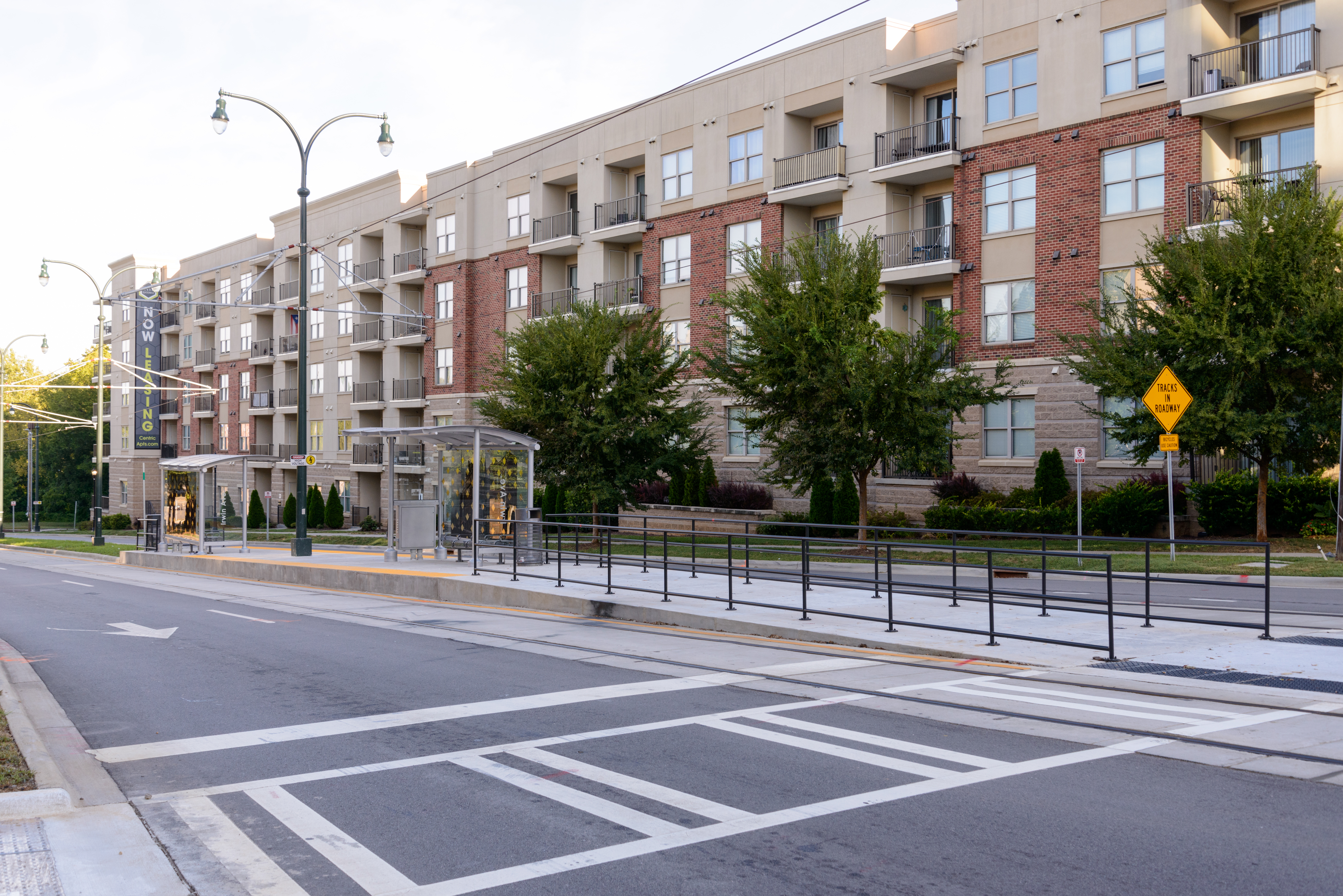
- Streetcar stop along West Trade Street

General information
- Location: 1009 West Trade Street; Charlotte, North Carolina; United States
- Coordinates: 35.23500°N 80.85277°W
- Owner: Charlotte Area Transit System
- Platforms: 1 island platform
- Tracks: 2

Construction
- Structure type: At-grade
- Cycle facilities: Bicycle racks
- Accessible: yes

History
- Opened: August 30, 2021

Services
Preceding station	CATS	Following station
Wesley Heights toward French Street	CityLynx Gold Line	Johnson & Wales University toward Sunnyside Avenue
Location

Irwin Avenue is a streetcar station in Charlotte, North Carolina. The at-grade island platform on West Trade Street is a stop along the CityLynx Gold Line, serving Johnson & Wales University and Gateway Village.

== Location ==
Irwin Avenue station is located at the intersection of West Trade Street, Irwin Avenue, and Johnson & Wales Way, in Uptown Charlotte. The immediate area features multi-level apartments, Johnson & Wales Charlotte campus, and Gateway Village office park. Also nearby, one to two blocks away, is Fraizer Park, Irwin Creek Greenway, and James Dennis Rash Park.

== History ==
Irwin Avenue station was approved as a Gold Line Phase 2 stop in 2013, with construction beginning in Fall 2016. Though it was slated to open in early-2020, various delays pushed out the opening till mid-2021. The station opened to the public on August 30, 2021.

== Station layout ==
The station consists of an island platform with two passenger shelters; a crosswalk and ramp provide platform access from West Trade Street. The station's passenger shelters house two art installations by Jim Hirschfield and Sonya Ishii.
