= Davidson Street station =

Streetcar station in Charlotte, North Carolina

Davidson Street
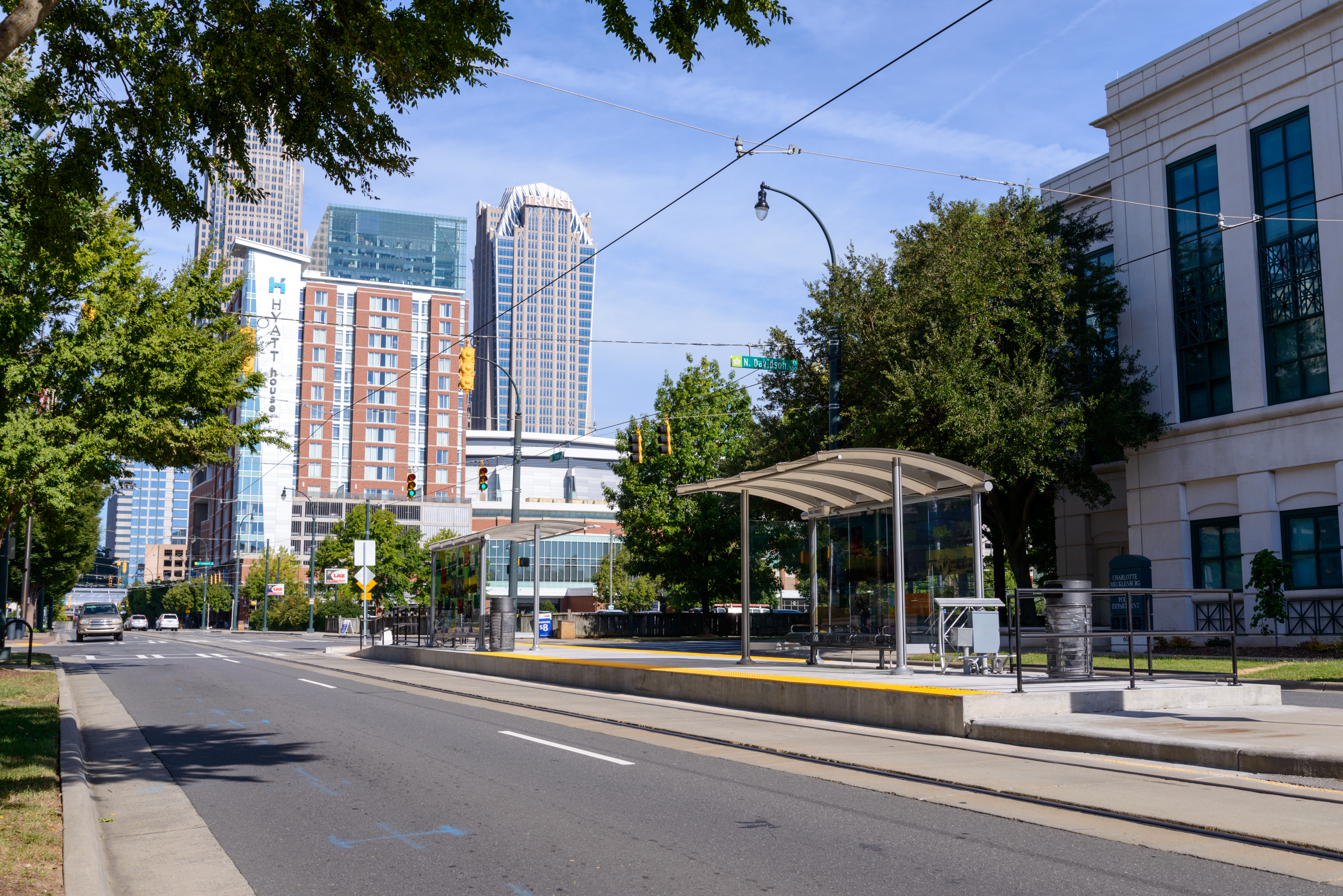
- Streetcar stop along East Trade Street

General information
- Location: 604 East Trade Street; Charlotte, North Carolina; United States
- Coordinates: 35.2226882°N 80.8378007°W
- Owner: Charlotte Area Transit System
- Platforms: 1 island platform
- Tracks: 2
- Connections: CATS: 9, 17, 23, 27

Construction
- Structure type: At-grade
- Cycle facilities: Bicycle racks
- Accessible: yes

History
- Opened: July 14, 2015

Services
| Preceding station | CATS | Following station |
|---|---|---|
| CTC/Arena toward French Street | CityLynx Gold Line | McDowell Street toward Sunnyside Avenue |
Location

Davidson Street is a streetcar station in Charlotte, North Carolina. The at-grade island platform on East Trade Street is a stop along the CityLynx Gold Line and serves various government agencies and facilities, including the Charlotte-Mecklenburg Government Center (CMGC).

== Location ==
Davidson Street station is located at the intersection of East Trade and Davidson Streets, in Uptown Charlotte. In the immediate is Charlotte City Hall, Charlotte-Mecklenburg Police Department Main Headquarters, and the Federal Reserve Bank of Richmond's Charlotte Branch; while nearby is the CMGC and First Baptist Charlotte.

== History ==
As part of the initial 1.5-mile (2.4 km) Gold Line, construction on Davidson Street began in December 2013. The station opened to the public on July 14, 2015, with a low platform configuration that was used for heritage streetcars. In June 2019, as part of phase two, streetcar service was replaced by the CityLynx Connector bus; at which time the station's island platform was closed off so it can be raised to accommodate the level boarding for modern streetcar vehicles. Though it was slated to reopen in early-2020, various delays pushed out the reopening till mid-2021. The station reopened to the public on August 30, 2021, at which time the CityLynx Connector bus was discontinued.

== Station layout ==
The station consists of an island platform with two passenger shelters; a crosswalk and ramp provide platform access from East Trade Street. The station's passenger shelters house two art installations by Nancy O’Neil. The windscreens honor those who work to keep the city safe, featuring a collage of historical maps, photos, and manuscripts on glass.
