= Bruns Avenue station =

Streetcar station in Charlotte

Bruns Avenue
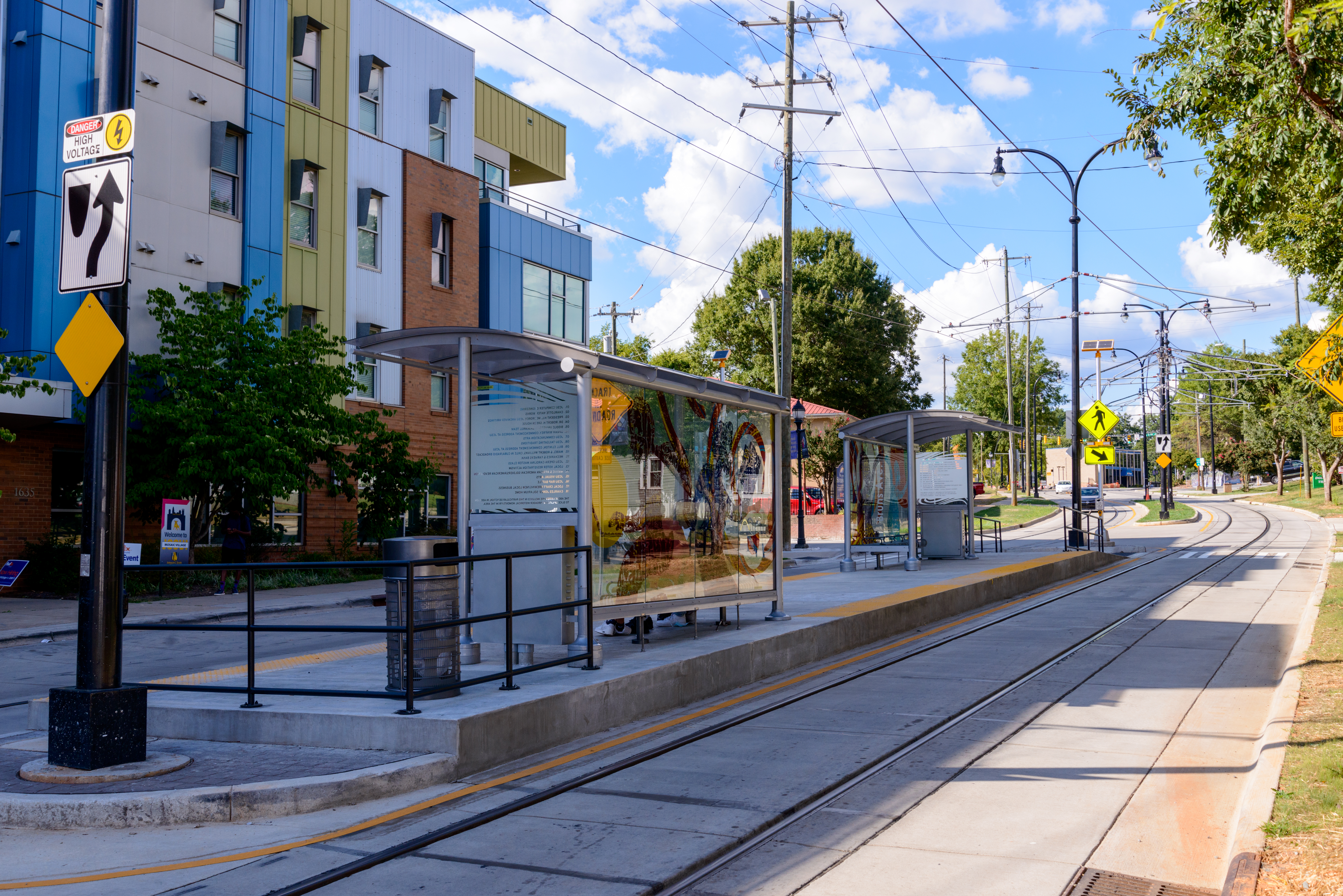
- Streetcar stop in the shadow of the Mosaic Village

General information
- Location: 1699 West Trade Street; Charlotte, North Carolina; United States
- Coordinates: 35.24000°N 80.85846°W
- Owner: Charlotte Area Transit System
- Platforms: 1 island platform
- Tracks: 2

Construction
- Structure type: At-grade
- Cycle facilities: Bicycle racks
- Accessible: yes

History
- Opened: August 30, 2021

Services
Preceding station	CATS	Following station
Johnson C. Smith University toward French Street	CityLynx Gold Line	Wesley Heights toward Sunnyside Avenue
Location

Bruns Avenue is a streetcar station in Charlotte, North Carolina. The at-grade island platform on West Trade Street is a stop along the CityLynx Gold Line, serving the Seversville and Western Heights neighborhoods.

== Location ==
Bruns Avenue station is located on West Trade Street, between South Bruns Avenue and North Bruns Avenue, and is flanked by the Mosaic Village and Jerusalem House of God. The Seversville and Western Heights neighborhoods, part of West End, were established in the late 1800s; with Seversville developing as a ring village that was economically focused with nearby Savona Mill, and Western Heights developed by W. L. Alexander as a purpose built residential suburb. Off West Trade Street, the area is a mix of single-family homes and multifamily residential buildings.

== History ==
Bruns Avenue station was approved as a Gold Line Phase 2 stop in 2013, with construction beginning in Fall 2016. Though it was slated to open in early-2020, various delays pushed out the opening till mid-2021. The station opened to the public on August 30, 2021.

== Station layout ==
The station consists of an island platform with two passenger shelters; a crosswalk and ramp provide platform access from West Trade Street. The station's passenger shelters house two art installations by George Bates. The windscreens are titled: The Worth of That, is That Which It Contains and That is This, and This With Thee Remains. The title comes from a 1954 JCSU yearbook excerpt referencing Shakespeare's sonnet 74. The micro and macro figures and images share the specific and general history of the area.
