= CPCC station =

Streetcar station in Charlotte, North Carolina, USA

CPCC
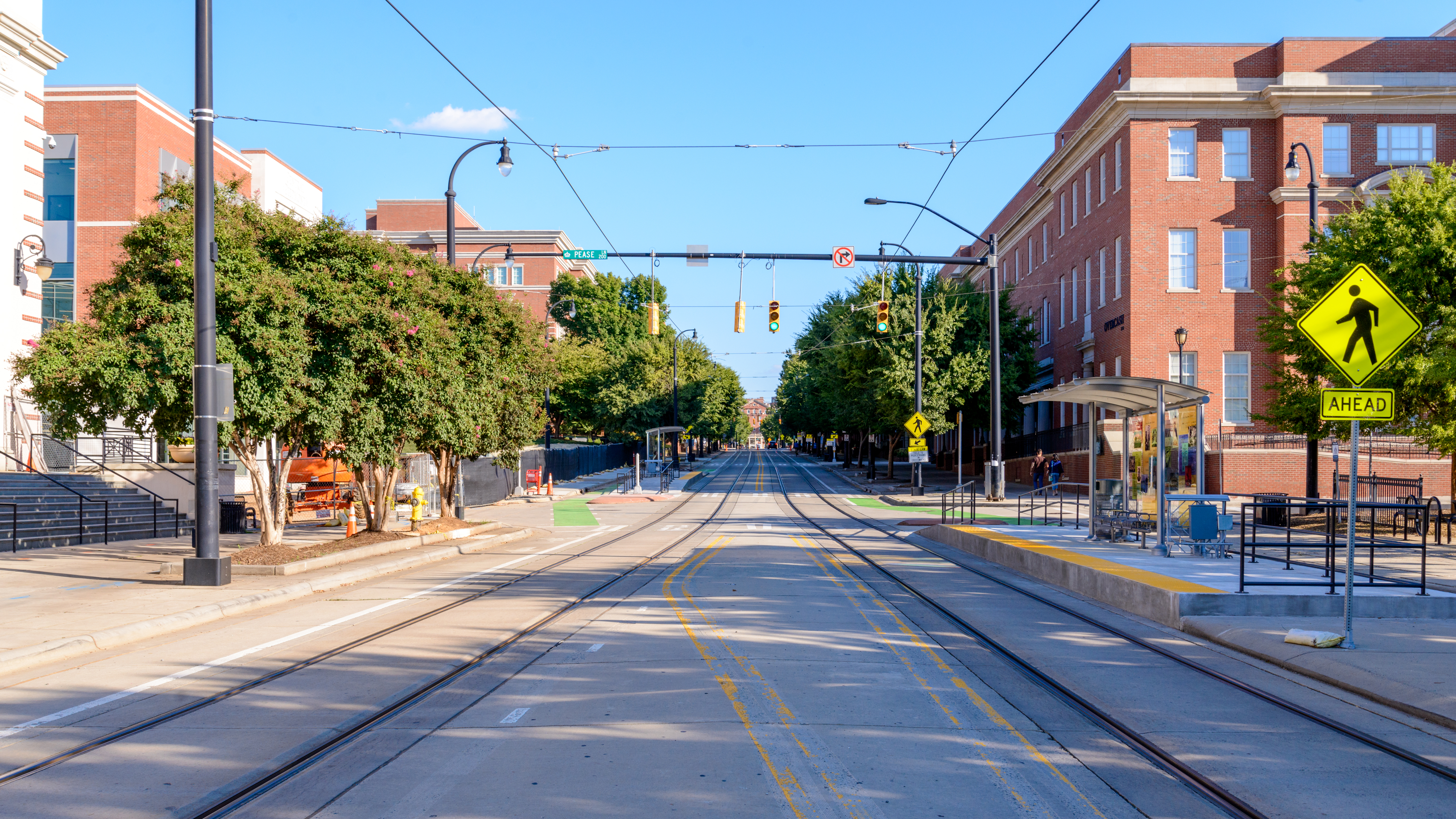
- Streetcar stop along Elizabeth Avenue

General information
- Location: 1160 Elizabeth Avenue; Charlotte, North Carolina; United States
- Coordinates: 35.2176665°N 80.831473°W
- Owner: Charlotte Area Transit System
- Platforms: 2 side platforms
- Tracks: 2

Construction
- Structure type: At-grade
- Cycle facilities: Bicycle racks
- Accessible: yes

History
- Opened: July 14, 2015

Services
Preceding station	CATS	Following station
McDowell Street toward French Street	CityLynx Gold Line	Elizabeth & Hawthorne toward Sunnyside Avenue
Location

CPCC is a streetcar station in Charlotte, North Carolina. The at-grade dual side platforms on Elizabeth Avenue are a stop along the CityLynx Gold Line and serves Central Piedmont Community College.

== Location ==
CPCC station is located at the intersection of Elizabeth Avenue and Pease Lane, at Central Piedmont Community College. Nearby is the American Legion Memorial Stadium, Elizabeth Park, Grady Cole Center, Little Sugar Creek Greenway, and Thompson Park.

== History ==
As part of the initial 1.5-mile (2.4 km) Gold Line, construction on CPCC began in December 2013. The station opened to the public on July 14, 2015, with a low platform configuration that was used for heritage streetcars. In June 2019, as part of phase two, streetcar service was replaced by the CityLynx Connector bus; at which time the station's two side platforms were closed off so they can be raised to accommodate the level boarding for modern streetcar vehicles. Though it was slated to reopen in early-2020, various delays pushed out the reopening till mid-2021. The station reopened to the public on August 30, 2021, at which time the CityLynx Connector bus was discontinued.

== Station layout ==
The station consists of two side platforms and two passenger shelter; crosswalks and ramps provide platform access from Elizabeth Avenue. Bike lanes, along Elizabeth Avenue, traverse behind the platforms and are marked in green. The station's passenger shelters house two art installations by Nancy O’Neil. The windscreens focuses on education and aspiration as well as development along Little Sugar Creek, featuring a collage of historical maps, photos, and manuscripts on glass.
