= Shirley Fulton =

American judge and prosecutor (1952–2023)

The Honorable Shirley Fulton
- Born: January 2, 1952
- Died: February 8, 2023 (aged 71)
- Education: Duke University Law School
- Occupation: Judge
- Organization: North Carolina Superior Court

Shirley L. Fulton (January 2, 1952 – February 8, 2023) was an American judge and prosecutor. She was the first African American woman to serve as a judge in the Superior Court of North Carolina, a position she held for 14 years. Earlier in her career, she had served as the first black female prosecutor in Mecklenburg County, North Carolina.

== Early life and education ==
Born on January 2, 1952, Fulton was the second of five children of Jacob Fulton, a farm laborer in Kingstree, South Carolina. As a child, she helped pick cotton and tobacco before school every morning, along with her siblings. While in high school, she worked at a funeral home operated by Virgil Dimery. Dimery encouraged her to volunteer for voter registration drives, and took her along to political rallies.

Fulton left home at age 16 to attend college in North Carolina. Fulton dropped out of college after three years, before completing a bachelor's degree at North Carolina A&T State University in 1977. In 1980, she earned her Juris Doctor degree at Duke University.

== Career ==
Upon graduating from college, Fulton worked at the Guilford County register of deeds office in North Carolina, and decided to study law. After law school, she worked for a small law firm in Durham, before moving to Charlotte.

In 1982, Fulton was appointed as an assistant district attorney, the start of her 20-year career in the Mecklenburg County courthouse. She was the first black female prosecutor in the county, and served under District Attorney Peter Gilchrist.

In 1987, Fulton was appointed a District Court judge, replacing Terry Sherrill, who had been the only black judge among eleven in Mecklenburg. She was selected by Governor James G. Martin after receiving the largest number of votes in an election conducted by the Mecklenburg County Bar. In 1988, Judge Fulton was elected to the bench of the North Carolina Superior Court, in the newly created, predominantly African American district of Mecklenburg. She became chief resident judge, the highest ranking judge in the Superior Court, after Chase Saunders retired in 1997.

During her tenure as judge, Fulton led several high-profile initiatives, including what became known as "the Fulton Plan", an effort to reform handling of criminal cases system-wide to make them more racially equitable, and more efficient in the face of a significant backlog. She also campaigned for bonds to raise funds to build a new courthouse. In addition, she introduced programs to improve the court's handling of cases involving non-English speakers, offering free Spanish classes to judges, lawyers, and court clerks. Judge Fulton gave death sentences to three convicted murderers, a decision she later said forced her to reexamine her beliefs.

Fulton left the bench to enter private practice in 2002, and was a founding partner at Tin Fulton Walker & Owen, where she practiced business and real estate law. She later formed her own alternative dispute resolution firm, Fulton Consulting, and practiced with Singletary Law Firm.

== Civic activities ==
A past president of the Wesley Heights Community Association, Fulton was an advocate of community development and neighborhood improvement. She served as a board chair of the Charlotte Housing Authority, and was a co-organizer of the Queen City Congress, a coalition of downtown neighborhoods such as Washington Heights and Dilworth.

Fulton restored the historic George Pierce Wadsworth House, which she acquired in 2001, and turned it into a conference and events center in Wesley Heights. During the 2012 Democratic National Convention held in Charlotte, North Carolina, Fulton hosted 400 delegates and guests from New Jersey and Maryland at Wadsworth House.

In 2015, Fulton presided over a mock grand jury hearing in Raleigh, North Carolina, organized by the North Carolina Medicaid Expansion Coalition. The hearing was organized to "shame" state legislators who had voted to block expansion of government assistance to low-income households.

Fulton served as the chair of the former Charlotte School of Law's board of advisors, working with the school to provide scholarships to students. She also served on the Charlotte-Mecklenburg Schools Task Force. In Mecklenburg County, she served as co-chair of the local chapter of United Agenda for Children, and was a past president of the county bar association.

== Awards and accolades ==
In 2009, Fulton was the recipient of a Citizen Lawyer Award from the North Carolina Bar Association. In 2010, Fulton received the Order of the Long Leaf Pine in recognition of her service to North Carolina.

In 2014, Fulton was presented with the Chief Justice's Professionalism Award, "for her selfless dedication and commitment to the principles of professionalism and public service in North Carolina".

In 2018, Fulton was inducted as a Legal Legend of Color by the NCBA Minorities in the Profession Committee. Other accolades included the Dr. Martin Luther King Jr. Medallion, awarded by the Charlotte Community Relations Committee.

== Personal life and death ==
While studying at university, Fulton was a single mother raising a toddler son.

In 1993, Fulton was diagnosed with breast cancer, and took a leave of absence in 1995 to undergo treatment, including a double mastectomy and stem cell transplant, at Duke. She was named chief judge of the North Carolina Superior Court after returning to work full-time in 1997.

Fulton was married to Leon Orr, who preceded her as president of the Wesley Heights Community Association. The couple first moved to Wesley Heights when Fulton was elected judge, buying a duplex which they restored into a single-family home, which became a local landmark.

Fulton died in hospice on February 8, 2023, of complications from gallbladder cancer.
