= Charlotte Transportation Center =

Intermodal transit station in North Carolina, US

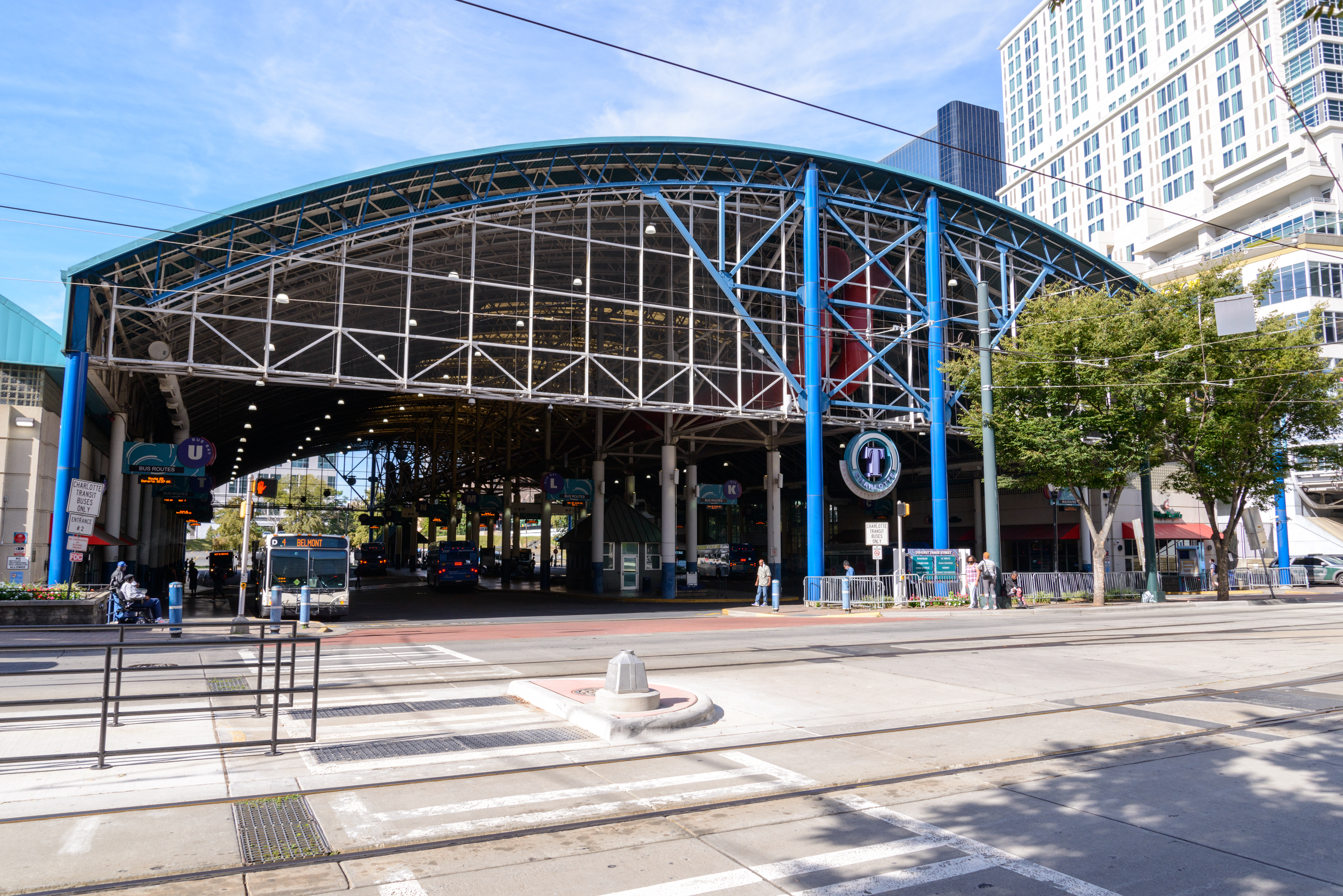
- Charlotte Transportation Center at street level

General information
- Location: 310 East Trade Street; Charlotte, North Carolina; United States
- Coordinates: 35°13′30″N 80°50′29″W
- Owner: Charlotte Area Transit System
- Platforms: 2 island platforms (CityLynx Gold Line); 2 side platforms (Lynx Blue Line)
- Tracks: 4
- Bus routes: 44
- Bus stands: 22
- Bus operators: Charlotte Area Transit System

Construction
- Structure type: At-grade/Elevated
- Cycle facilities: Bicycle racks
- Accessible: yes

History
- Opened: December 11, 1995 (bus); November 24, 2007 (light rail); July 14, 2015 (streetcar)

Services
Preceding station	CATS	Following station
3rd Street/Convention Center toward I-485/South Boulevard	Lynx Blue Line	7th Street toward UNC Charlotte–Main
Tryon Street toward French Street	CityLynx Gold Line	Davidson Street toward Sunnyside Avenue
Former services
Preceding station	CATS	Following station
3rd Street/Convention Center toward Atherton Mill	Charlotte Trolley	7th Street toward 9th Street
Location

The Charlotte Transportation Center (CTC), also known as Arena or CTC/Arena, is an intermodal transit station in Uptown Charlotte, North Carolina, United States. It serves as the central hub for the Charlotte Area Transit System (CATS) buses and connects with the Lynx Blue Line and CityLynx Gold Line. It is located on East Trade Street, Fourth Street and Brevard Street. Notable places nearby include the Bank of America Corporate Center, Belk Theater, EpiCentre, Overstreet Mall and the Spectrum Center.

== History ==
The CTC celebrated its grand opening on December 11, 1995, through a partnership with then-NationsBank. Its completion moved the central transfer point for all CATS buses from The Square, two blocks to the west, to Trade Street. The facility was an effort to improve traffic congestion along Tryon Street and provide transit riders a more efficient centralized transfer point.

The Lynx Blue Line station officially opened on November 24, 2007. The unique platform cover, made of synthetic materials and supported by curved steel, was originally scrapped due to high costs, but was later brought back and constructed after multiple Uptown businesses donated money to make up the difference in construction costs.

On July 14, 2015, the CityLynx Gold Line was officially opened with its initial 1.5-mile (2.4 km), six-stop segment (Phase 1).

== Redevelopment ==
In 2019 the city received a bid from developers to purchase the 2.6-acre (1.05 ha) site and redevelop it. In August 2019 the city began a competitive-bidding process which led to White Point Partners and Dart Interests being selected to redevelop the site. The development is planned to be a public-private partnership to create a new transportation hub which will also include retail and office space. The original building options being considered were a ground level bus station, below ground station, or above ground station. Also included in the redevelopment would be a training center for the Charlotte Hornets, which will be a part of the $215 million the city agreed in order to extend the Hornets' lease of Spectrum Center until 2045.

In January 2023 Charlotte City Council approved a below ground bus station. This option was chosen to reduce the security risks by only allowing access to ticketed passengers. As of February 2023 Charlotte City Council voted to allow the city manager to create a nonbinding memorandum of understanding with developers to move forward with the redevelopment process. This step is one of many steps and approvals needed before starting construction.

== Services ==
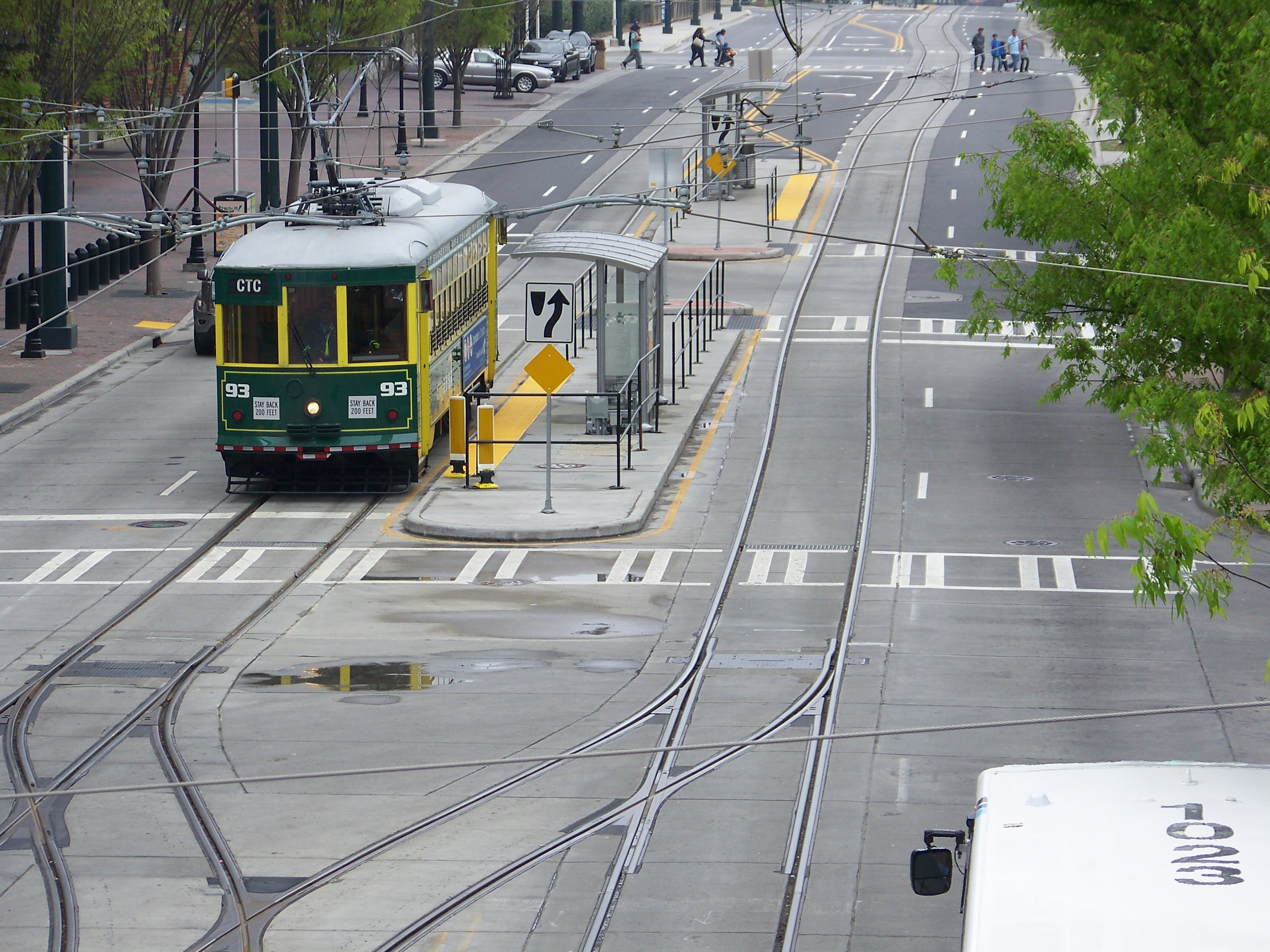
The CityLynx Gold Line's double-island-platform stop for CTC/Arena, viewed from the Blue Line light rail station, with a streetcar ending a trip

The CTC has 20 internal bus bays and two external bus bays, serving 44 bus routes (local and express). In addition, the Gold Rush Red Line, a free shuttle service, connecting to Johnson & Wales University and Johnson C. Smith University, along Trade Street.

The CityLynx Gold Line, located at the intersection of East Trade Street and Brevard Street, is a streetcar line that connects to Central Piedmont Community College and Novant Health Presbyterian Medical Center. It operates everyday with a 15-minute frequency (20-minute after 7:00pm). Access to the streetcar is by two island platforms, one facing westbound and another facing eastbound.

The Lynx Blue Line, located on an elevated platform above East Trade Street, is a light rail line that connects to South End and several park and ride lots along South Boulevard. It operates everyday with 10 to 30-minute frequency, depending on time of day. Access to the Blue Line station is by stairs or elevator from inside the CTC and then by outdoor walkway along the light rail tracks. The station is covered by a roof made of synthetic materials and supported by curved steel; side platforms, which sit on either side of the tracks, are used to access the trains. The CTC Blue Line station is signed as "CTC/Arena," reflecting that it is also the main stop for the Spectrum Center, accessible via two walkways.

Connection to the Amtrak Charlotte station, located 2 miles (3.2 km) from CTC, is via CATS Bus 11 (North Tryon). Connection to the Greyhound bus station, located at the future Gateway Station and 0.6 miles (0.97 km) from CTC, is via the CityLynx Gold Line or on foot along Trade Street.

== Station layout ==
As an intermodal transit station, the main facility is the open-air bus depot with 22 bus stands, using letters B-V and X, and the CityLynx Gold Line along Trade Street; connecting through a mezzanine level is the Lynx Blue Line and rail trail.

=== Amenities ===
The CTC is open from 4:50am till 1:30am daily. The facility includes the following restaurants and shops: Bojangles', Burger King, China Shuttle, Cricket Wireless, Lil' Orbits, Plaza Sundries and Subway. In the center of the CTC is CATS Customer Service, which includes lost and found, pass sales, transit IDs and information. Public restrooms are also available on site. For safety, the Charlotte-Mecklenburg Police Department has an expeditor unit on site.

=== Public art ===
As part of the CATS Art in Transit program, the CTC features several pieces intended to provide a better overall aesthetic for the station. The works include bas-reliefs entitled Gingko by Alice Adams, drinking fountain basins designed to look like dogwoods, the North Carolina state flower, by Nancy Blum, the Trade Street bridge supports entitled Bobbins pays hommage to Charlotte's textile industry was created by Andrew Leicester, Bobbins and track fencing featuring cottonwood leaves by Shaun Cassidy.
