= Grady Cole Center =

Arena in North Carolina, United States

Coordinates: 35.2182°N 80.8283°W

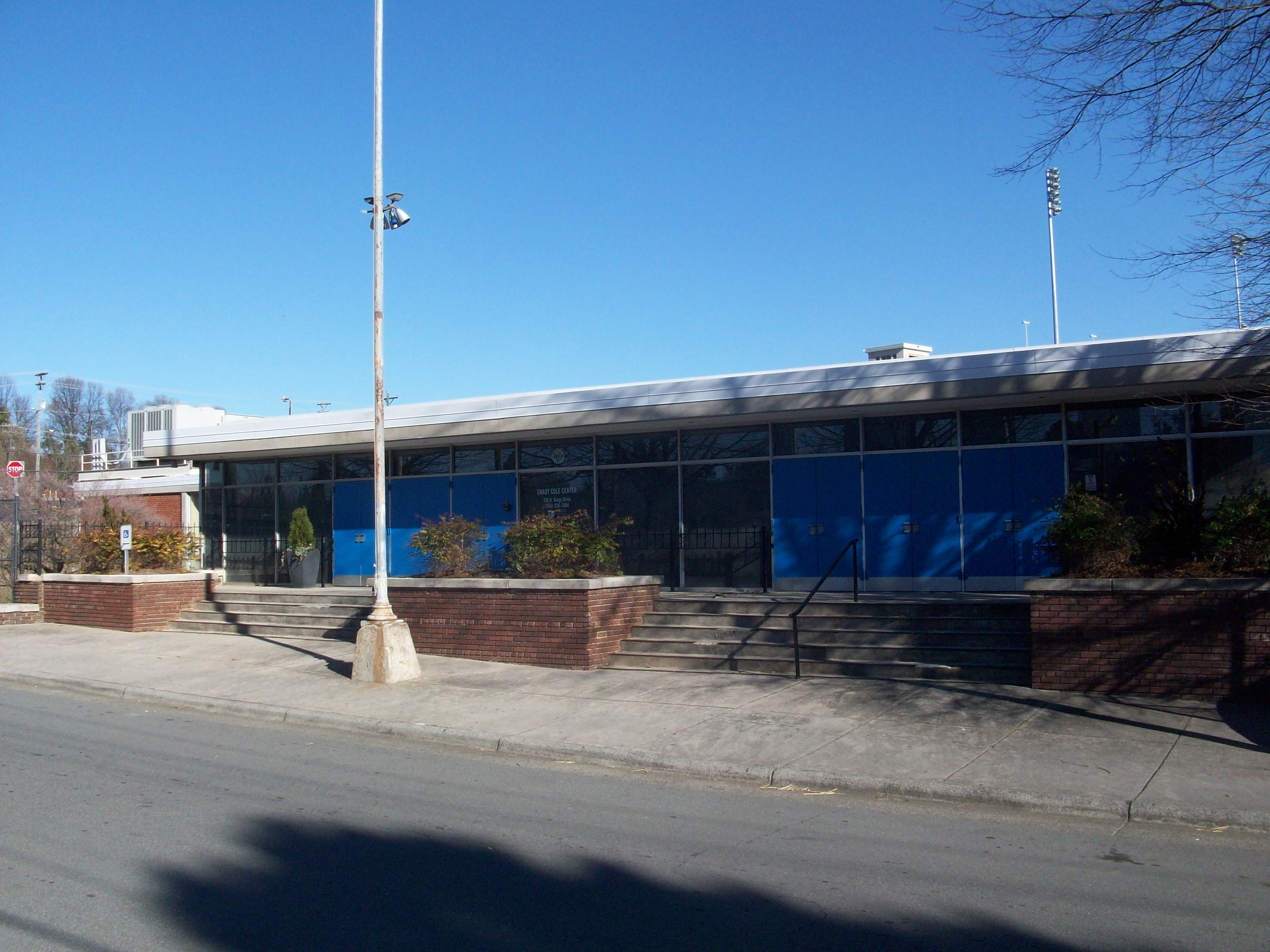
- Exterior view of the venue (c.2015)
- Interactive map of Grady Cole Center
- Former names: Charlotte Park Center (1956–87)
- Address: 310 North Kings Drive
- Location: Charlotte, North Carolina
- Owner: City of Charlotte
- Operator: Mecklenburg County
- Capacity: 2,500
- Public transit: CPCC

Construction
- Opened: July 16, 1956

Tenants
- Charlotte Roller Girls (WFTDA) (2010–present); Queens Royals (SAC) (2012)

Grady Cole Center is a small civic center located on the campus of Central Piedmont Community College in Charlotte, North Carolina. The 2,500 seat center is located near the city's center, and can host several types of events. It was built in 1954 to replace the Charlotte Armory Auditorium, which had been destroyed by fire. Originally the Charlotte Park Center, it was renamed in 1987 in honor of WBT Radio morning personality, Grady Cole. The arena is a part of the Mecklenburg County Sportsplex, which also includes the American Legion Memorial Stadium.

== Noted events ==
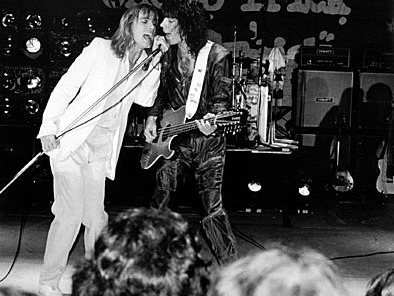
Cheap Trick at Charlotte, N.C.'s Park Center (Grady Cole Center), 1978

TV Superman George Reeves and a troupe including Noel Neill, Gene Lebell, Chaz Chase, and The Florida Trio performed two shows at the center on August 31, 1957.

On September 25, 1960, Martin Luther King Jr. spoke at the Park Center after an invitation from the local NAACP chapter. He had been invited to speak in Charlotte in 1958; however, he suffered a stabbing in New York that canceled his visit.

The building was an important venue for Jim Crockett Promotions during the organization's heyday.

In the late 1980s and early 1990s, the Grady Cole center served as the practice facility for the Charlotte Hornets.

Due to increasing demands & needs of touring productions in the late 1970s and early 1980s, a local regional promoter Kaleidoscope Productions paid to install the additional electrical service Company switches for tours in the city's owned building, to save money from having to continue renting generators to supply the additional power from an ongoing per concert/event basis.

The arena hosted UFC 3 in 1994.

Concerts held in the arena include The Allman Brothers with Duane Allman, Frank Zappa, Black Sabbath, Bootsy Collins and James Gang in 1972, Pink Floyd in 1973, David Bowie in 1974, Cheap Trick in 1978, Ozzy Osbourne in 1991, as well as shows by Dire Straits, Rush, Frehley's Comet, Stevie Ray Vaughan, R.E.M., Warrant in the 1980s. The 1990s saw shows from Megadeth, Testament, Dave Matthews Band, Phish, Widespread Panic, Marilyn Manson, August 5, 1994 Counting Crows, September 26th 1996 Beck with opening act Dirty Three December 6, 1996 Tool, and with Jan 31st 1998 the venue hosted Judas Priest, as well as Coldplay in 2003 and Good Charlotte and Simple Plan in 2005.

The venue hosted multiple Rave dance parties with national and international touring DJs.

The arena hosted the 2007 CIAA women's volleyball tournament. The arena also hosted the Internet-only pay-per-view ROH The Big Bang! on April 3, 2010.

The arena was home to Barstool Sports's Rough-N-Rowdy 3 in 2018.

Queens University of Charlotte has used the arena for athletic events in 2012 while construction work is done on their usual on-campus home.

The arena was home to Deadlock Pro-Wrestling's (DPW) Super Battle event

Events and tenants
Preceded by Mammoth Gardens	Ultimate Fighting Championship venue UFC 3	Succeeded by Expo Square Pavilion
