= Johnson C. Smith University station =

Streetcar station in Charlotte

Johnson C. Smith University
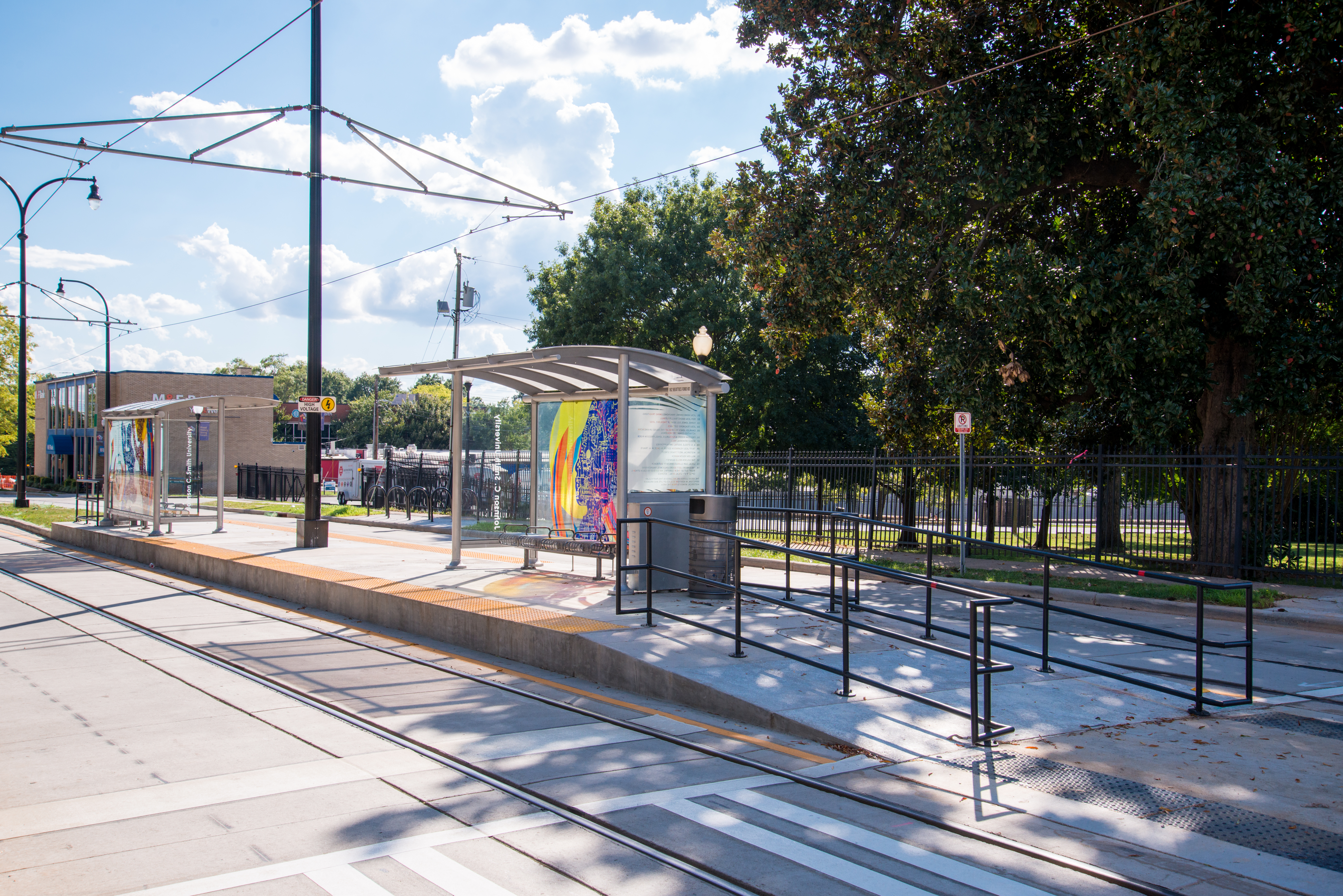
- Streetcar stop along Beatties Ford Road

General information
- Location: 162 Beatties Ford Road; Charlotte, North Carolina; United States
- Coordinates: 35.24300°N 80.85839°W
- Owner: Charlotte Area Transit System
- Platforms: 1 island platform
- Tracks: 2
- Connections: CATS: 7

Construction
- Structure type: At-grade
- Cycle facilities: Bicycle racks
- Accessible: yes

History
- Opened: August 30, 2021

Services
Preceding station	CATS	Following station
French Street Terminus	CityLynx Gold Line	Bruns Avenue toward Sunnyside Avenue
Location

Johnson C. Smith University is a streetcar station in Charlotte, North Carolina. The at-grade island platform on Beatties Ford Road is a stop along the CityLynx Gold Line, serving Johnson C. Smith University and Five Points.

== Location ==
Johnson C. Smith University station is located on Beatties Ford Road, flanked by nearby Mechanics and Farmers Bank (M&F Bank) and Johnson C. Smith University. Five Points, the intersection of Beatties Ford Road, Rozzelles Ferry Road, State Street, West Fifth Street, and West Trade Street, is one of the oldest intersections in the Mecklenburg County and the gateway to West End. With the university and various businesses at its core, it connects the historically black neighborhoods of Biddleville and Seversville, while also being one mile (1.6 km) from Uptown Charlotte.

== History ==
Johnson C. Smith University station was approved as a Gold Line Phase 2 stop in 2013. In tandem with the project, the Five Points Public Plaza project adds improvements to the area including a new public plaza, landscaping, pedestrian lighting, wider sidewalks, and various artwork; total cost of $5.5 million (2021 US dollars). Construction began in Fall 2016 and was slated to open in early-2020, but various delays pushed out the opening till mid-2021. The station opened to the public on August 30, 2021.

== Station layout ==
The station consists of an island platform with two passenger shelters; a crosswalk and ramp provide platform access from Beatties Ford Road. The station's passenger shelters house two art installations by George Bates. The windscreens are titled: The Worth of That, is That Which It Contains and That is This, and This With Thee Remains. The title comes from a 1954 JCSU yearbook excerpt referencing Shakespeare's sonnet 74. The micro and macro figures and images share the specific and general history of the area.
