= Company switch =

Basic electrical switch design

A company switch is a basic electrical switch design. They are used for electric power distribution systems in theaters, arenas, convention centers, that often require panel boards for electrical equipment.

Company switches are designed to be easy to use, easily portable, safe and fast.
