= Independence Park (Charlotte, North Carolina) =

Park in North Carolina, US

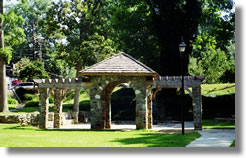
- Interactive map of Independence Park
- Type: Public park
- Location: Charlotte, North Carolina
- Coordinates: 35.2155°N 80.8224°W
- Area: 24 acres (9.7 ha)
- Created: 1904
- Operator: Mecklenburg County Parks and Recreation
- Website: Independence Park

Independence Park is a 24-acre urban park at 300 Hawthorne Lane situated at the western end of the Elizabeth neighborhood in Charlotte, North Carolina. The park was created in 1924 at the urging of Charlotte industrialist Daniel Augustus Tompkins, founder of the Charlotte Observer, and is the oldest public park in Charlotte. It reopened in August 2023 after being closed for renovations that enhance accessibility and add permanent restrooms, among other improvements.

Independence Park is split into two sections by Hawthorne Lane. Both sections lie below street level which gives the park a secluded and tranquil atmosphere, despite the fact that the site commands excellent views of the Charlotte skyline. The lower park contains a winding path, a rose garden, large, leafy trees, a reflecting pond, and a gazebo. The upper park contains more trails, a playground, several athletic fields, and the 300 seat Independence Park Stadium.

Independence Park is the site in Charlotte of the Afro-Caribbean themed Juneteenth Festival of the Carolinas on June 19 of each year.

== Arhelger Memorial ==
In June 1931 a group of Girl Scouts from Charlotte was visiting Glen Burney Falls in Blowing Rock, North Carolina. One girl fell into the falls, and 21-year-old counselor Lillian Arhelger lost her life when she jumped in to save her. A memorial to the fallen hero was erected, and today the bronze and stone Lillian Arhelger Memorial, with its reflecting pool, is a prominent feature in the upper half of Independence Park.
