= Amy Cheng (visual artist) =

Taiwanese-American visual artist (born 1956)

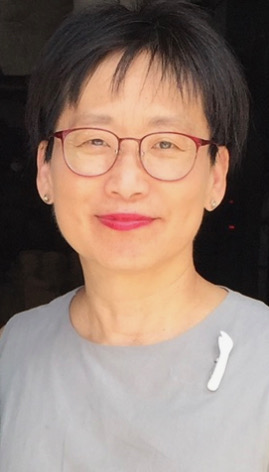
- Cheng in 2018
- Born: December 8, 1956 (age 69); Kaohsiung City, Taiwan
- Education: University of Texas at Austin (BFA); Hunter College (MFA)
- Style: Studio art
- Website: www.amychengstudio.com

Amy Cheng (born December 8, 1956) is a Taiwanese-American artist with a dual career in painting and 2-D public art fabricated in mosaic, glass, tile, terrazzo and more. Cheng's work is characterized by its complexity, layering, patterning, geometry, spatial play, and exploration of micro/macro realms.

== Life and career ==
Amy Cheng was born in Kaohsiung City, Taiwan. Her family moved to Brazil in 1961, first to Sapucaia, a village in Rio Grande do Sul, then to São Paulo, S.P. In 1967 her family immigrated from Brazil to the U.S. (to Oklahoma City, OK), and, in 1969 moved to Dallas, TX. She received a Bachelor of Fine Arts degree (BFA) in painting from the University Texas at Austin (1978) and an M.F.A. in painting from Hunter College, City University of New York (1982). Cheng lived in New York City from 1978 to 1989 when she moved to Tivoli, in New York's Mid-Hudson Valley. She moved to New Paltz in 1997 when she was hired to teach at SUNY New Paltz. In 2019 she moved back to New York City, and retired from teaching a year later. She currently lives in New York City and maintains an art studio in the South Bronx.

== Mature work ==
In 2019, on a sabbatical, Cheng spent three months as artist-in-residence at the Carter Burden Covello Center in Manhattan. By the close of her stay Cheng had moved away from making large oil paintings on canvas to making small gouache and oil marker paintings on paper. Cheng moved into a series of geometric abstractions that explored deeper layered space while retaining the pattern and repetition she has used consistently throughout her painting career. At the new reduced scale, the fine marker linear hatching and crosshatching turned the patterning and repetition into a sense of texture. In 2023 Cheng began to invent a visual vocabulary to speculate on the mysteries of the universe at the macro and micro levels. Cheng overtly, if playfully, references concepts of astrophysics and quantum mechanics as she delves into the mystery of consciousness. These paintings are characterized by intricacy, layering, referential abstraction, geometry, organic shapes, dynamic space, and a sense of matter and energy in a state of constant flux. Critic and curator Dan Cameron said this about her work: "I really respond to the generative intelligence in the work, that it seems to be a world unto itself, following its own ... natural laws, and these laws are about fecundity and fertility and the generation of more life."

In 2009, Cheng spent six months in Brazil on a Fulbright Senior Lecture/Research grant as a visiting professor in the Graduate Painting Program of São Paulo University, S.P., Brazil. This was her first time returning to Brazil since leaving at the age of 10. She intended to study Brazilian folk art, but found herself more drawn to the tropical Brazilian flora. After she returned from the Fulbright she spent 3 months as an Artist-in-Residence at the McColl Center for the Arts in Charlotte, NC. It was at the Center that Cheng began a series of paintings that led directly to the Mandala Series that occupied her for through the 2010s. The Mandala oil paintings ranged from 30 x 30-in to 62 x 90-in, and used a base composition of two overlapping spheres or, more often, a central sphere symmetrically overlapping two touching spheres. The poet Mark Sullivan wrote in a catalog essay that “[Cheng] immersed herself in the ethic of a nearly impersonal and meditative form of creation ... the paintings’ decorative forms [...] accentuate the sensation that we are gazing at vibrant imaginary worlds, almost visionary in their flashes of chromatic patterning.”

== Early work ==
In the mid-1980s, starting with a single pear in a painted frame, Cheng began a decade's long series of monumental fruit paintings. In 1987 one of the framed pear paintings was included in a group exhibition titled "Singular Objects" at Art in General in New York City. The show was reviewed by Ellen Handy in Arts Magazine. Cheng's painting, "Medieval Pear" was singled out by Handy, for notice. In 1989 Cheng was included in "Radiant Fruit: Iconic Still Life" curated by Suzaan Boettger at Trabia Gallery in New York City. The monumental pear paintings come across more as portraits than still life, a quality Cheng attributes to her Asian sensibility: the Chinese do not render fruits as comestibles on a table; rather, fruits carry symbolic meaning that references states of nature.

By 1988 Cheng's paintings had moved beyond single fruits to clusters of monumental fruits set in a landscape space. Cheng had her first solo exhibition at The Harrison Gallery, Boca Raton, FL in 1991, and her first solo exhibition in New York City at the C&A Gallery in 1992. The repetition, patterning, and ornamentation that had until then been relegated to the painted frames that enclosed the single pears were fully overlapping the fruits themselves by the mid-1990s; the patterns were either painted or silk-screened on, and eventually became more visually dominant than the underlying fruit.

Amy Cheng, Quantum Fields, 24 x 36 x 1.5 inches, acrylic gouache, and oil marker on wood panel, 2026

In 1997, inspired by her immersion in Islamic art in Egypt and Turkey, Cheng moved in a new direction, away from fruits, to produce a body of work that introduced a new abstract, if referential, vocabulary of geometry, layering, complexity, and references to the cosmos. Abstraction allowed Cheng to take full advantage of her love of pattern, repetition, and ornamentation. In 1996 she curated a group show of work by Asian American artists at the Eighth Floor Gallery in New York City called Repetition Compulsion, based on what she saw as the artists' common reliance on and use of patterning in their work.

Two books, Alchemy and Mysticism by Alexander Roob and a paperback on Chinese Folk Art became sources for a series of paintings spanning the 2000s that addressed Cheng's interest in the mysticism engendered by alchemical notions in the West, and the prevalent beliefs and superstitions that held strong, long-term sway in China.

== Exhibitions ==
Cheng has had solo exhibitions at the Plattsburgh State Art Museum, the Turchin Center for Visual Arts, the Voelker Orth Museum, Tower Fine Art Gallery, SUNY at Brockport, The Marist College Art Gallery, NYC's Equity Gallery, and more. She has been in group exhibitions at PS 122, Amy Simon Fine Art Gallery, Samuel Dorsky Museum of Art, New Jersey State Museum, Dorsky Gallery Curatorial Projects, Visual Arts Center of New Jersey, Mary Tomás Gallery, William Havu Gallery, and others.

== Public commissions ==
Cheng has 20 years of experience working in public art. Consistent with her studio art, she has used a visual vocabulary that includes layers, geometry, pattern, repetition, and ornamentation. The public projects at times include figuration or representation, but are more often abstract but referential. The impact of her work comes from the color, use of materials, ornamentation, elegance, a balance of stillness and movement, and an energetic sense of joy and optimism. Many of her commissions are sited at public transportation hubs such as airports, subway stations, bus terminals, or streetcar shelters. She has an interest in large, timeless, sometimes cosmic themes. Her award winning projects embrace a variety of media and include:

- “Seeing Through the Layers of Time,” a set of oil-painted Dibond™ panels in the auditorium of P.S. 58, the School of Heroes, Maspeth, NY.
- In Memory of My Father Nai Ling Cheng, a mosaic column at the Seattle–Tacoma International Airport;
- “La Flores,” seven faceted glass windscreens at the Cleveland St. MTA Subway Station, Brooklyn, NY;
- "Destination: Points Unknown", a hand-painted ceramic tile mural at the Howard St. El Station, Chicago, IL;
- "Rediscovery," four laminated glass windscreen at the 25th Ave. subway station, Brooklyn, NY;
- "Nucleic Life Formation", two water-jet cut ceramic tile and brass sheeting murals at the Lambert-St. Louis International Airport MetroLink Station, St. Louis, MO;
- "Celestial Playground", a mosaic and brass sheeting mural at the Jacksonville Airport, Jacksonville, FL;
- "Nature Provides," a mosaic and glass blob mural at Western State Hospital's Patient Services building, Lakewood, WA which was selected for inclusion in CODAmagazine's 2022 Art & Wellness issue.
- "Worlds Within Worlds", four laminated and etched glass windscreens at two streetcar stations in Charlotte, NC, and streetcar ceiling and seating designs for the Charlotte Area Transit System's GoldLynx streetcars. Worlds Within Worlds was selected in 2023 as one of the 100 best art in public places by CODAawards, the project was featured in the March 2023 CODAmagazine, Transformative Walls issue and was included in the book THE ECONOMIC POWER OF PUBLIC ART.
- "In Our Own Backyard", a mosaic tile, porcelain tile and printed glass mural at the Valley Regional Transit Bus Terminal, Boise, ID;
- "Beyond the Biosphere", two printed vinyl awnings at the Slausson Bus Station, Los Angeles, CA;
- "Big Skies", four printed vinyl traffic boxes for downtown Odessa, TX
- "Palmystery," a terrazzo floor for the lobby of the Broward County Property Assessment office in Fort Lauderdale commissioned by the Broward County Cultural Division.

== Fellowships and awards ==
- FST Studio Projects Fund in 2023
- Fulbright Lecture Fellowship teaching in the Painting Graduate Program of the Art Department at Renmin University of China, Beijing. PRC in 2017
- P.S. 122 Studio Artist Space Program in New York City's East Village in 2012. ^{[67]}
- Fulbright Senior Lecture/Research grant to Brazil, where she was a visiting professor in the Graduate Painting Program at University of São Paulo, Sāo Paulo, S.P., Brazil in 2008
- Contemplative Practice Fellowship from the Center for Contemplative Mind in Society in 2005
- New York Foundation for the Arts Painting Fellowship in 1990
- Arts International travel grant to China in 1994
- New York Foundation for the Arts Painting Fellowship in 1996

== Academic work ==
Cheng is a professor emerita of the Art Department, State University of New York at New Paltz. She was a full professor from 2004 to 2020, associate professor from 1999 to 2004, assistant professor from 1997 to 1999. Cheng was an assistant professor at Bard College, 1989–1997, a lecturer in the Visual Arts Program, Princeton University in 1989.

In 2017 after returning from her Fulbright semester in China, Cheng contributed a chapter, "Learning to See: A Fulbright Semester Teaching Painting in Beijing," NARRATIVE INQUIRIES FROM FULBRIGHT LECTURERS IN CHINA: Cross-Cultural Connections in Higher Education, published by Routledge.

In 1999 Cheng co-chaired with Patricia Phillips, Dean of the School of Fine and Performing Arts, SUNY New Paltz an ARTS NOW Conference on art and audience titled "ooh, ah…oh! Art Audience Response."

In 1998-99 Cheng participated in a 26-person working group funded by the Ford Foundation headed by Prof. Marc Miring that contributed to a landmark book titled The Social Health of the Nation: How America is Really Doing, by Profs. Miringoff and Marque-Louise Miringoff.

== Selected Collections ==
- The Hyde Collection
- New York University Langone Medical Center
- Banyan Primera
- Novartis Pharmaceuticals
- Chevron Corporation
- Wyeth Pharmaceuticals
- Sheraton Hotels Brussels
- Montefiore Einstein Fine Art Collection
- Florida-Atlantic University
- Sam Houston University
- University of Oregon
- Scholastic Productions
- King County Public Art Collection
- Hewlett-Packard
- United States State Department
- U.S. Embassy, Kazakhstan, and others
