= Wesley Heights Historic District =

Historic district in North Carolina, United States

- U.S. National Register of Historic Places
- U.S. Historic district
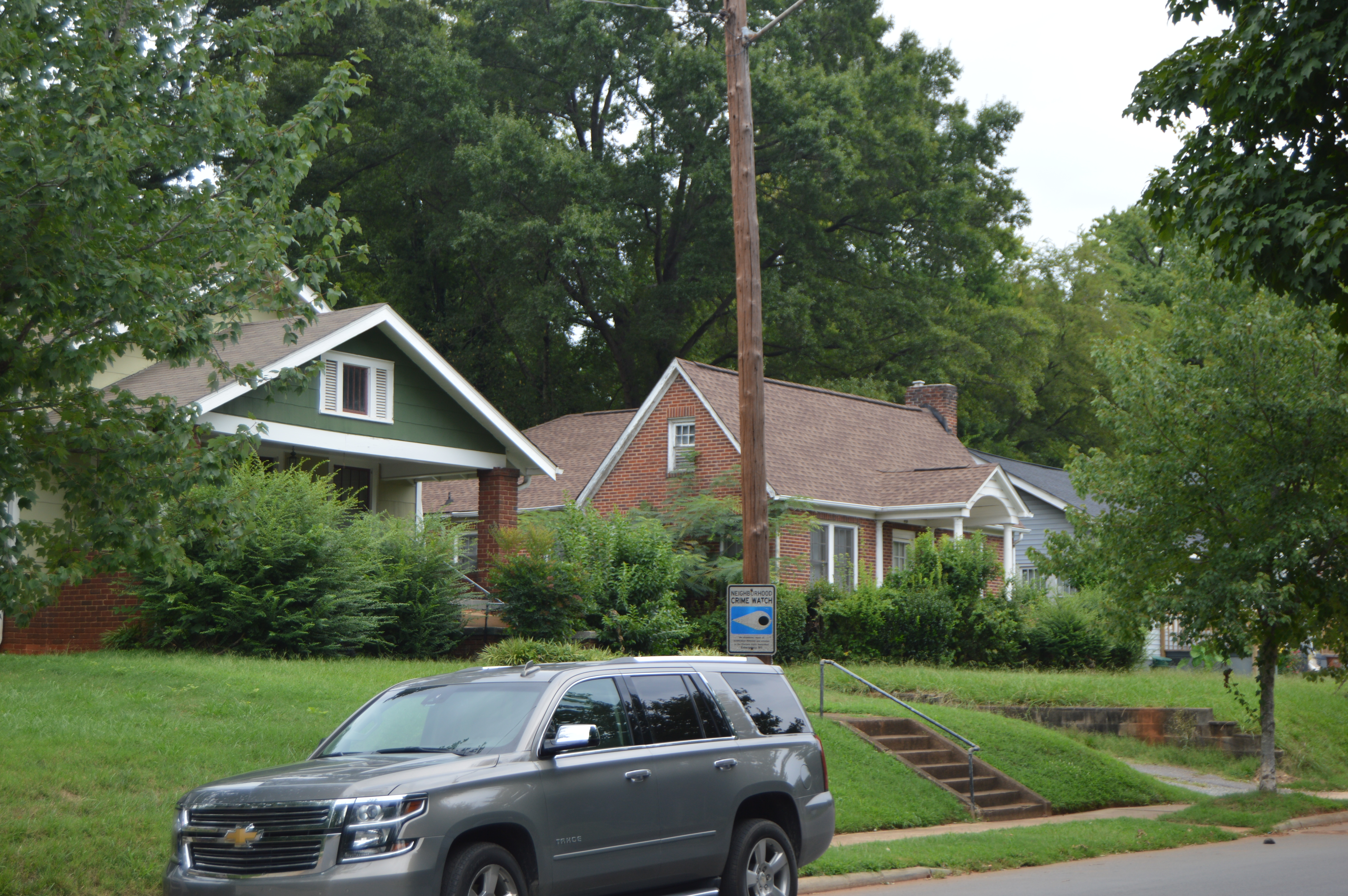
- Houses on Summit Avenue

- Location within North Carolina Location within the United States
- Location: Bounded by W. Morehead St., Woodruff Pl., Lela Ave., CSX RR tracks, Tuckaseegee Rd., W. Trade St. and S. Summit Ave., Charlotte, North Carolina
- Coordinates: 35°13′58″N 80°51′48″W
- Area: 105 acres (42 ha)
- Built: 1911
- Architect: Louis Asbury, et al.
- Architectural style: Bungalow/craftsman, Colonial Revival, Tudor Revival
- NRHP reference No.: 95001397
- Added to NRHP: November 29, 1995

Wesley Heights Historic District is a national historic district located at Charlotte, Mecklenburg County, North Carolina, United States. The district encompasses 335 contributing buildings in the former streetcar suburb of Wesley Heights. It was developed after 1911 and includes notable examples of Bungalow / American Craftsman, Colonial Revival, and Tudor Revival style architecture. Notable buildings include the Wesley Heights Methodist Episcopal Church (now Greater Bethel A. M. E. Church) designed by architect Louis H. Asbury, St. Mark's Baptist Church (formerly St. Andrew's Episcopal Church), Bomar Apartments (1928), and the Wadsworth House (1911) and Catawba Apartments also designed by Louis H. Asbury.

It was added to the National Register of Historic Places in 1995.
