= Elizabeth (Charlotte neighborhood) =

Historic district in North Carolina, United States

- Neighborhood
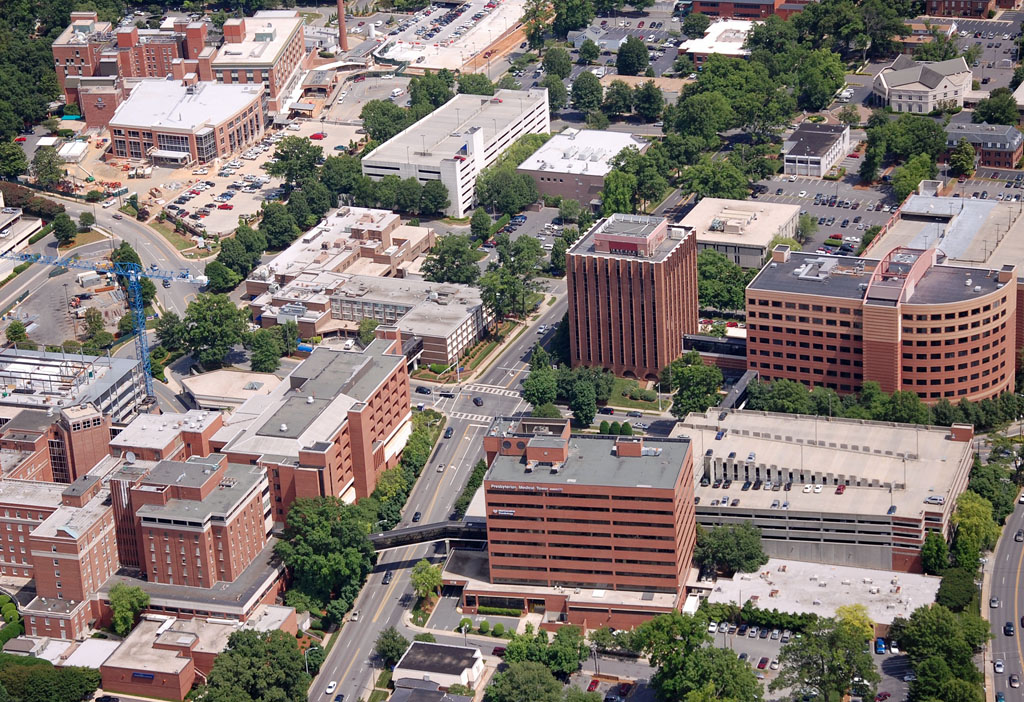
- Elizabeth

- Location within North Carolina Location within the United States
- Coordinates: 35°12′51″N 80°49′5″W
- Country: United States
- State: North Carolina
- County: Mecklenburg
- City: Charlotte
- Founded: 1891
- Annexed: 1907
- Named after: Elizabeth College

Area
  - Total: 1.384 sq mi (3.585 km^{2})

Population (2009)
  - Total: 3,961
- according to City-Data.com
- Zip Code: 28204, 28207
- Elizabeth Historic District
- U.S. National Register of Historic Places
- U.S. Historic district
- Location: Roughly bounded by Central Ave., Seaboard Coast Line Railroad, E. 5th St., Kenmore Ave., Park Dr., and E. Independence, Charlotte, North Carolina
- Area: 265 acres (107 ha)
- Built: 1900
- Architect: John Nolen
- Architectural style: Colonial Revival, Bungalow/Craftsman, Tudor Revival
- NRHP reference No.: 88003003
- Added to NRHP: January 3, 1989

Elizabeth takes its name from Elizabeth College, a small Lutheran women's college founded in 1897 on the present-day site of Presbyterian Hospital. The community began in 1891 when a streetcar was established along East Trade Street to the area, making it the second oldest streetcar suburb in Charlotte. Elizabeth began to develop rapidly after 1902, when a trolley line was completed, and was annexed in 1907. Home of Independence Park, the first public park in the city, Elizabeth became one of the most fashionable residential areas in Charlotte in its early days. In 2006 Elizabeth had a population of 3,908.

Because much of the neighborhood was developed in the early 20th century, Elizabeth's trees have had time to mature. They now form a canopy over most of Elizabeth's residential streets. In addition, Elizabeth is more pedestrian-friendly than most Charlotte neighborhoods, businesses and residences are in close proximity, and most roads have sidewalks. The Walk Score of Elizabeth is 72, one of the highest in Charlotte (average Walk Score of 34).

The current boundaries of the Elizabeth neighborhood are, roughly, Randolph Road/4th Street to the Southwest; Independence Boulevard to the West and North; and a creek to the East. Major avenues include Elizabeth Avenue and 7th Street.

A substantial portion of the neighborhood is listed on the National Register of Historic Places as the Elizabeth Historic District. The district encompasses 887 contributing buildings, 1 contributing site, 4 contributing structures, and 1 contributing object. The district was listed in 1989. Notable buildings include the William Henry Belk House, James L. Staten House, Hawthorne Lane United Methodist Church, St. John's Baptist Church, the W. Reynolds Cuthbertson House, the houses of John B. Alexander and his nephew Walter L. Alexander, the Jennie Alexander Duplex, Caldwell Memorial Presbyterian Church, and the Rutzler Apartments.

Elizabeth contains two major hospitals (Presbyterian Hospital and Mercy Hospital), and a number of medical offices line Randolph Road. Along 7th Street there are numerous old houses that have been converted into shops, offices, and restaurants. At the western end of the neighborhood lie Independence Park and American Legion Memorial Stadium. A development project is underway to revitalize Elizabeth Avenue.

The Elizabeth neighborhood sponsors an annual Elizabeth Recycles Day, which was most recently held on May 11, 2013 in Independence Park. Neighbors collect household hazardous waste for recycling and/or appropriate disposal.

Elizabeth is bordered by Belmont, Chantilly, Crescent Heights, Eastover, First Ward, Grier Heights, and Myers Park.
