= Sunnyside Avenue station =

Streetcar station in Charlotte

Sunnyside Avenue
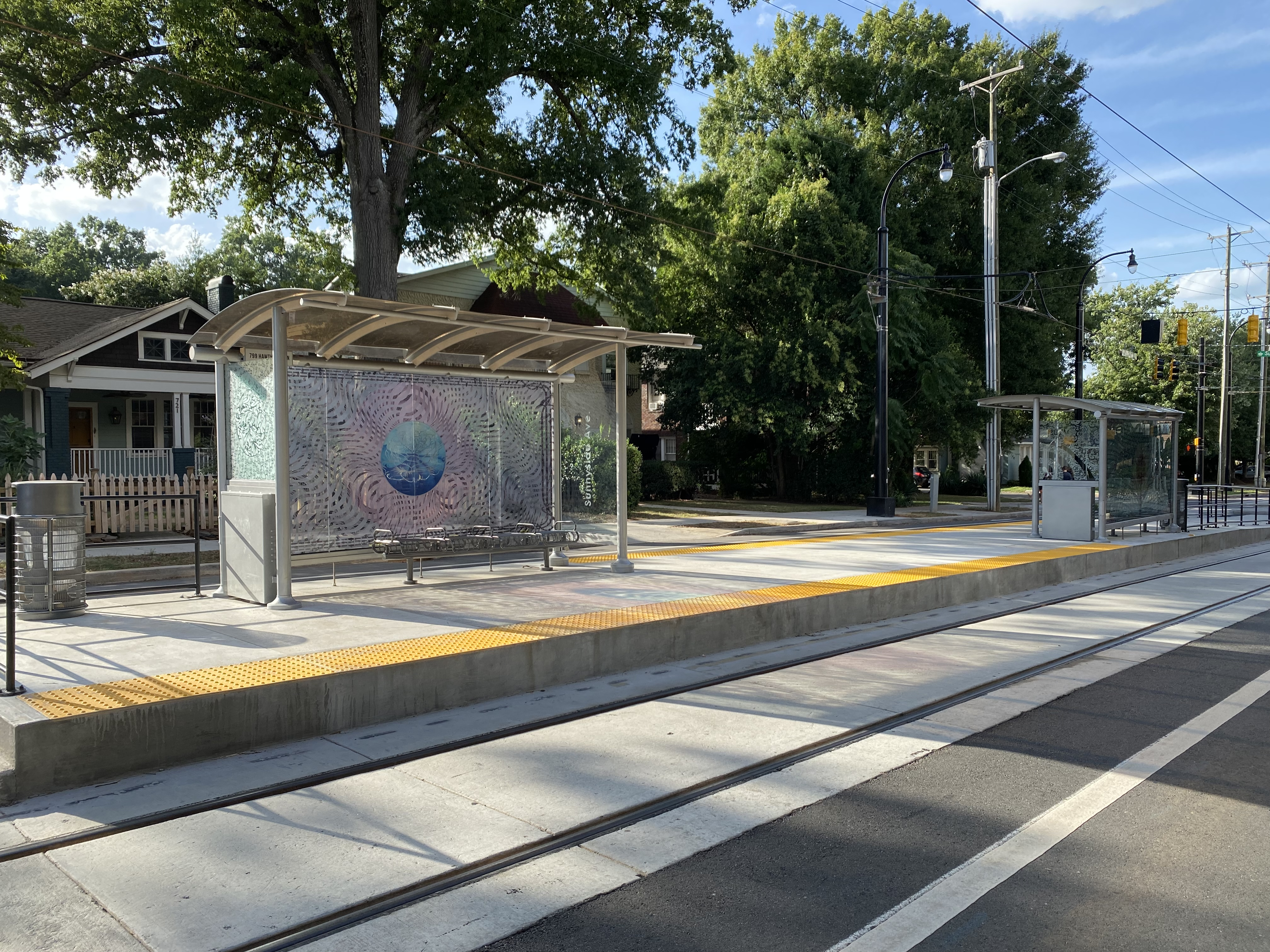
- Platform and shelters at Sunnyvale Avenue station

General information
- Location: 799 Hawthorne Lane; Charlotte, North Carolina; United States
- Coordinates: 35.21960°N 80.81884°W
- Owner: Charlotte Area Transit System
- Platforms: 1 island platform
- Tracks: 2

Construction
- Structure type: At-grade
- Cycle facilities: Bicycle racks
- Accessible: yes

History
- Opened: August 30, 2021

Services
Preceding station	CATS	Following station
8th Street toward French Street	CityLynx Gold Line	Terminus
Location

Sunnyside Avenue is a streetcar station in Charlotte, North Carolina. The at-grade island platform on Hawthorne Lane is the eastern terminus of the CityLynx Gold Line and serves the Elizabeth neighborhood.

== Location ==
Sunnyside Avenue station is located between Hawthorne Lane Bridge, over Independence Expressway (US 74/NC 27), and Sunnyside Avenue, in Elizabeth. The immediate area is a mix of single-family homes and multifamily residential buildings. The Plaza-Midwood commercial district is northeast of the station and is known for its eclectic mix of storefronts, bars, restaurants, and residential streets.

== History ==
Sunnyside Avenue station was approved as the Gold Line Phase 2 terminus in 2013. To facilitate track installation, the Hawthorne Lane bridge was closed from July 2017 until December 2020. The station opened to the public on August 30, 2021.

== Station layout ==
The station consists of an island platform with two passenger shelters; a crosswalk and ramp provide platform access from Hawthorne Lane. The station's passenger shelters house two art installations by Taiwanese–American artist Amy Cheng. Each World Within Worlds panel features a lace-like pattern etched into the glass. They are deliberately more abstract than works of art at other Gold Line stations and are meant to evoke the quieter aspects of the Elizabeth residential neighborhood.
