= French Street station =

Streetcar station in Charlotte

French Street
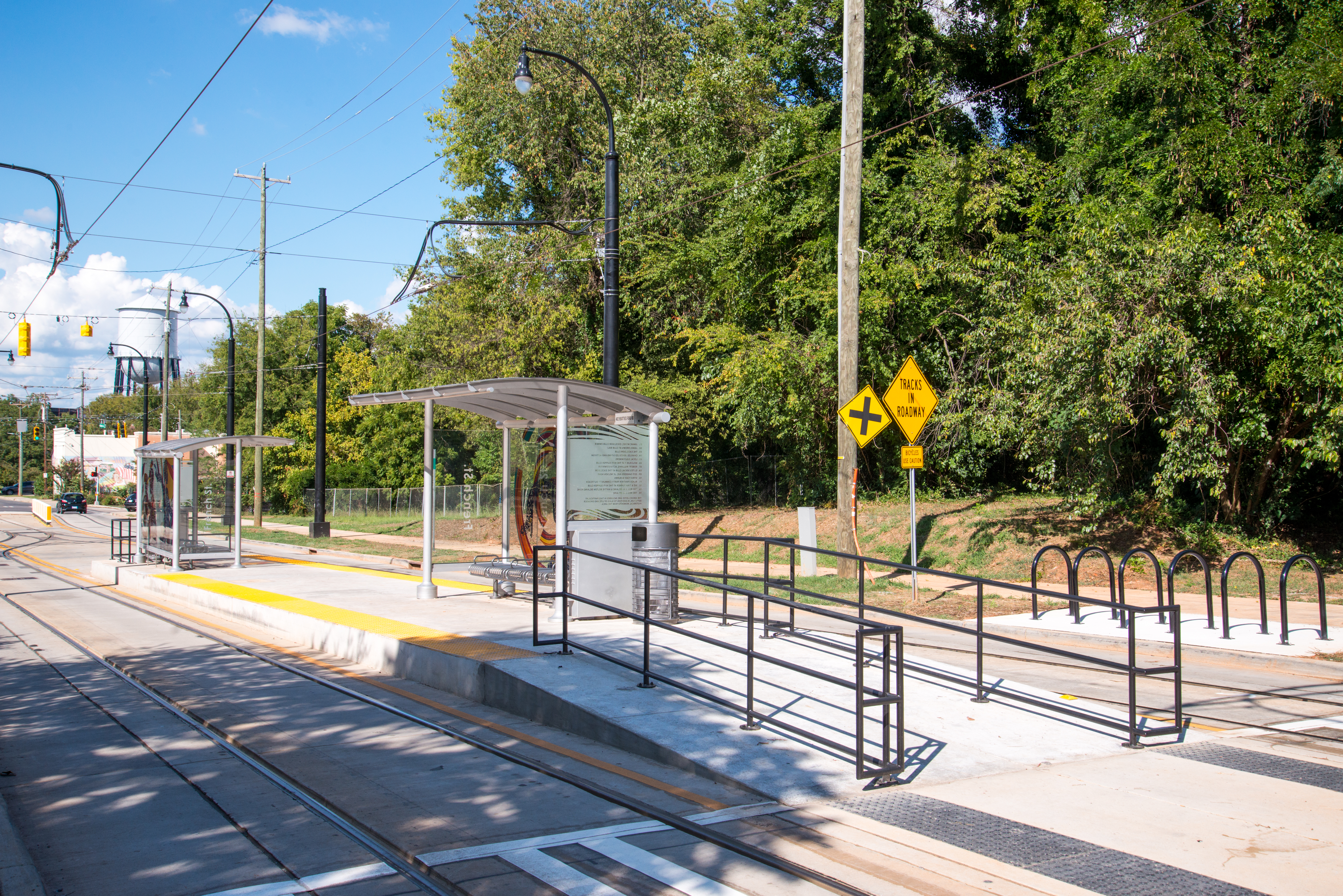
- Streetcar stop along Beatties Ford Road

General information
- Location: 402 Beatties Ford Road; Charlotte, North Carolina; United States
- Coordinates: 35.24601°N 80.85688°W
- Owner: Charlotte Area Transit System
- Platforms: 1 island platform
- Tracks: 2

Construction
- Structure type: At-grade
- Cycle facilities: Bicycle racks
- Accessible: yes

History
- Opened: August 30, 2021

Services
Preceding station	CATS	Following station
Terminus	CityLynx Gold Line	Johnson C. Smith University toward Sunnyside Avenue
Location

French Street is a streetcar station in Charlotte, North Carolina. The at-grade island platform on Beatties Ford Road is the western terminus of the CityLynx Gold Line and serves the Biddleville neighborhood.

== Location ==
French Street station is located on Beatties Ford Road, between French Street and Mill Road. The Biddleville neighborhood, part of West End, is noted as Charlotte's oldest surviving black neighborhood, beginning in 1871. The immediate area has a few businesses and churches, with single-family homes west off Beatties Ford Road. The nine-acre (3.6 ha) Five Points Park is located nearby.

== History ==
French Street station was approved as a Gold Line Phase 2 stop in 2013, with construction beginning in Fall 2016. Though it was slated to open in early-2020, various delays pushed out the opening till mid-2021. The station opened to the public on August 30, 2021.

== Station layout ==
The station consists of an island platform with two passenger shelters; a crosswalk and ramp provide platform access from Beatties Ford Road. North of the platform is the (non-passenger) layover area, where the streetcar goes to switch tracks and wait periodically. The station's passenger shelters house two art installations by George Bates. The windscreens are titled: The Worth of That, is That Which It Contains and That is This, and This With Thee Remains. The title comes from a 1954 JCSU yearbook excerpt referencing Shakespeare's sonnet 74. The micro and macro figures and images share the specific and general history of the area.
