= McDowell Street station =

Streetcar station in Charlotte, North Carolina, USA

McDowell Street
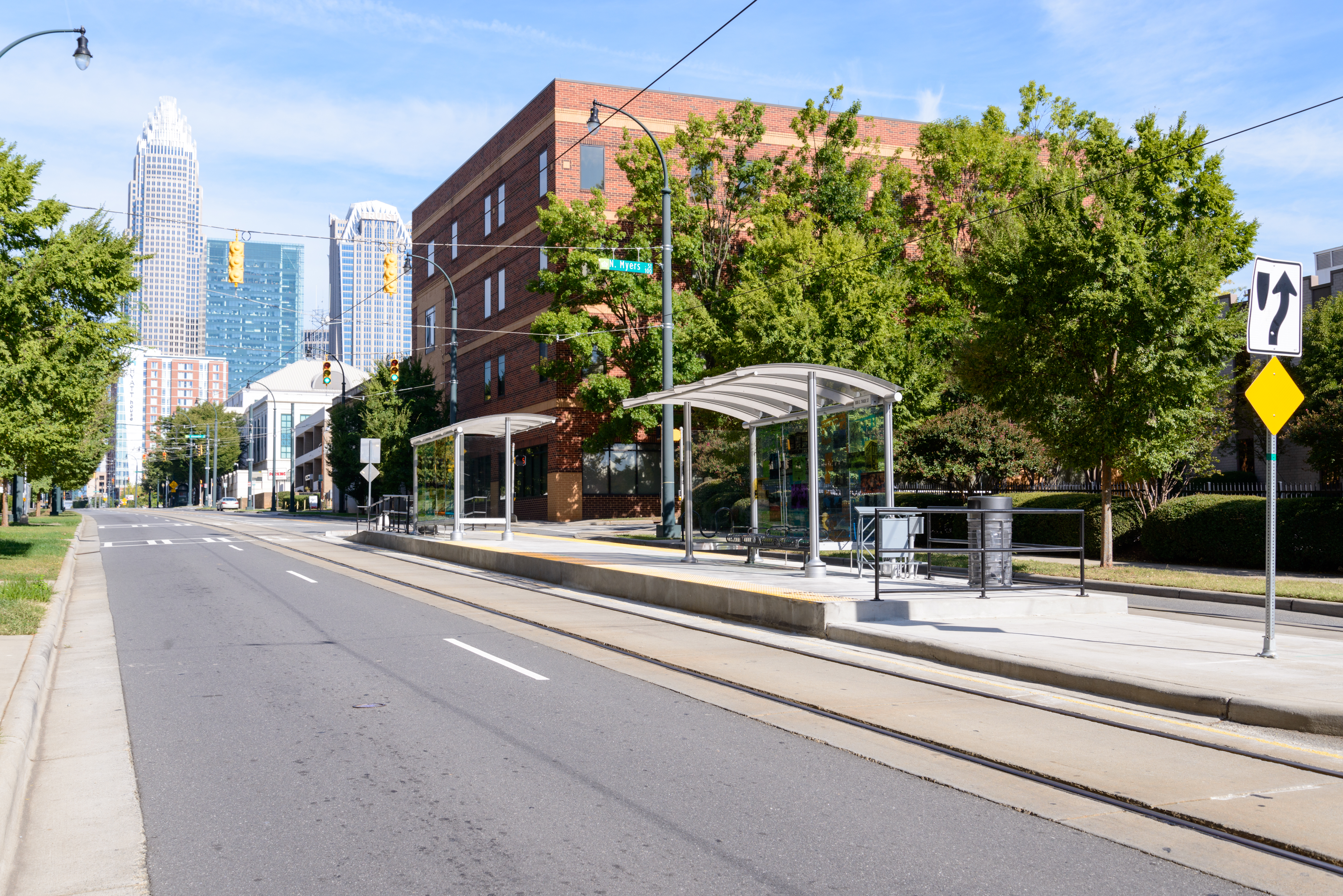
- Streetcar stop along East Trade Street

General information
- Location: 806 East Trade Street; Charlotte, North Carolina; United States
- Coordinates: 35.2210416°N 80.8359299°W
- Owner: Charlotte Area Transit System
- Platforms: 1 island platform
- Tracks: 2
- Connections: CATS: 9, 27

Construction
- Structure type: At-grade
- Cycle facilities: Bicycle racks
- Accessible: yes

History
- Opened: July 14, 2015

Services
Preceding station	CATS	Following station
Davidson Street toward French Street	CityLynx Gold Line	CPCC toward Sunnyside Avenue
Location

McDowell Street is a streetcar station in Charlotte, North Carolina. The at-grade island platform on East Trade Street is a stop along the CityLynx Gold Line and serves various government agencies and facilities, including the Mecklenburg County Courthouse.

== Location ==
McDowell Street station is located on East Trade Street, between Myers Street and McDowell Street, in Uptown Charlotte. In the immediate is the Mecklenburg County Detention Center-Central and Mecklenburg County District Attorney's Office; while nearby is the Mecklenburg County Courthouse and the Downtown Charlotte Post Office.

== History ==
As part of the initial 1.5-mile (2.4 km) Gold Line, construction on McDowell Street began in December 2013. The station opened to the public on July 14, 2015, with a low platform configuration that was used for heritage streetcars. In June 2019, as part of phase two, streetcar service was replaced by the CityLynx Connector bus; at which time the station's island platform was closed off so it could be raised to accommodate the level boarding for modern streetcar vehicles. Though it was slated to reopen in early-2020, various delays pushed out the reopening to mid-2021. The station reopened to the public on August 30, 2021, at which time the CityLynx Connector bus was discontinued.

== Station layout ==
The station consists of an island platform with two passenger shelters; a crosswalk and ramp provide platform access from East Trade Street. The station's passenger shelters house two art installations by Nancy O’Neil. The windscreens celebrate the diversity and history of Charlotte's First and Second Wards, featuring a collage of historical maps, photos, and manuscripts on glass.
