= Ally Charlotte Center =

Office building in Charlotte, North Carolina

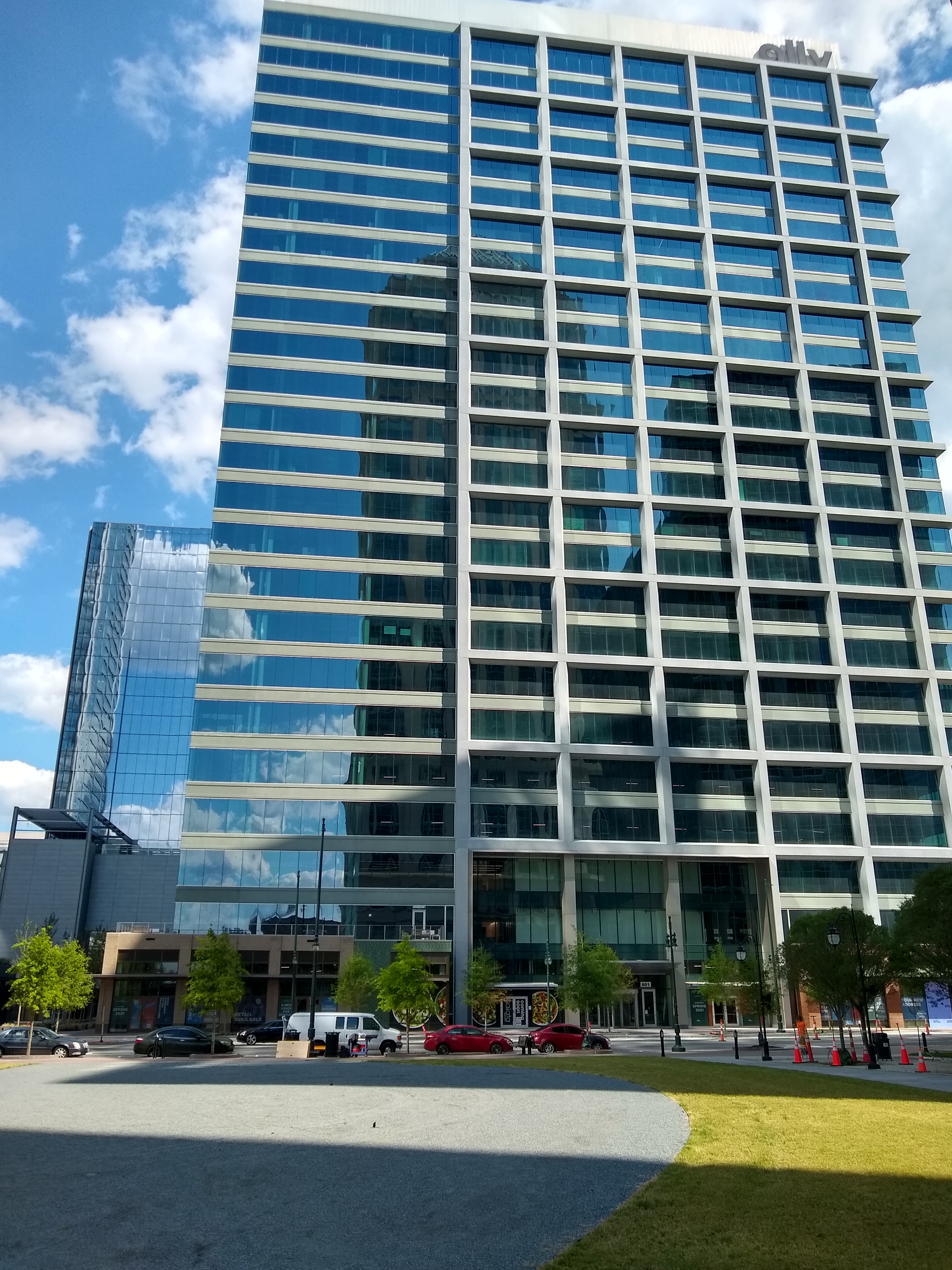
- Interactive map of Ally Charlotte Center
- Location: 601 South Tryon Street, Charlotte, North Carolina
- Status: Completed
- Groundbreaking: Q1 2018
- Opening: May 3, 2021
- Website: www.allycharlottecenter.com

Companies
- Architect: Little Diversified Architectural Consulting
- Developer: Crescent Communities

Technical details
- Buildings: Ally Charlotte Center, JW Marriott Charlotte
- Size: 3 acres

Ally Charlotte Center is a 2-building development in Uptown Charlotte, North Carolina. The office building was officially completed on May 3, 2021, it stands at a height of 378 (115.2). Each floor has an open floor plan and averages approximately 30,000 square feet (2,800 m^{2}) in size for a total of 742,000 square feet (68,900 m^{2}) of space which makes it the tenth largest building in Charlotte by leasable space. The site features a 381-room JW Marriott hotel including 34 suites, the first JW Marriott in North Carolina. The site also includes 25,000 square feet of restaurant and retail space, and an 8-story parking garage with 1,400 parking spots.

== History ==
Ally Financial began plans for the building in 2013. Initially the building was called Tryon Place. Prior to Ally's announced occupancy of the building Duke Energy was rumored to be the anchor tenant. However, the company choose to build Duke Energy Plaza as their new headquarters. Ally was planning to occupy only 400,000 square feet (37,000 m^{2}). In March 2014 Crescent Communities released more specifics plans for the building. Initially it was planned to be a 27-story office building with 500,000 square feet (46,000 m^{2}) to 1,000,000 square feet (93,000 m^{2}) of space on a 3-acre lot.

The building is located on the former proposed site of Trump Charlotte. The proposed Trump building would have been a mixed-use containing condos, high end shops, office space, and a five star hotel. The building was planned to be 72 stories would have been taller than the city's current tallest building, Bank of America Corporate Center.

The site of the JW Marriott was once home to the Query-Spivey-McGee Building. It was constructed in 1902 to function as a feed, seed, and gardening store into the 1980s. It also functioned as stables, several agricultural supply stores, an auto mechanic shop, a mattress and upholstery store, a gardening supply store, and the final use was the law firm of James, McElroy & Diehl. In Charlotte's early history Uptown served as a meeting place for farmers. The building's site was purchased by Crescent in 2018 for $6 million and torn down in March 2018.

== Office building ==
Currently Ally Financial occupies 725,000 square feet (67,400 m^{2}) of the building and is one of two office tenants of the building, the other being Crescent Communities. All 2,100 Charlotte-based employees and contractors will relocate to the new building from other Charlotte offices, which includes 440 South Church, 11605 N. Community House Road, WeWork space at 128 S. Tryon St, 1401 W. Morehead St, and 2101 Rexford Road. Ally will move into the building in phases as determined by teams.

Charlotte is becoming an important hub for Ally, which is headquartered in Ally Detroit Center. The company has 500 more employees based in Charlotte than in Detroit. The company's history in Charlotte dates back over 20 years. In 2001, GMAC, Ally's predecessor, moved to Ballantyne. In 2009, GMAC agreed to anchor 440 South Church by leasing 106,000 square feet (9,800 m^{2}). At that time there were only about 250 local employees. The company further increased its Charlotte presence in 2016 when it purchased TradeKing Group, a brokerage company, which had 105 employees based in Ballantyne at 11605 N. Community House Road. The CEO of Ally, Jeffrey Brown, has said this about Ally's presence in Charlotte "I think we will continue to see Charlotte increase in importance of the company's overall head count. It's a highly competitive market for talent, but it's a great market for talent. ... You have strong financial and accounting skills. You also have great technology skills as well." The company in 2020 alone hired 550 people in the Charlotte area.

In July 2021, Crescent sold the building to STS Properties LLC, an entity affiliated with Ally Financial Inc, for $390 million. This transaction is one of the largest building sales in Charlotte history. The largest transaction in Charlotte history was when Duke Energy sold Duke Energy Plaza to CGA Capital and Childress Klein for $675 million in December 2019.

In September 2022 Crescent Communities, the building's developer, moved into their new headquarters in the building occupying 30,000 square feet (2,800 m^{2}) on the eighth floor. The space was designed to highlight the company's history and story. Many of the materials used in the space's construction highlight past development projects. The space is also designed to facilitate collaboration with several spots such as team rooms or workspaces, throughout the office that feature collaborative technology, breaking barriers to virtual work and easing the connection to Crescent offices in other cities. At the time of the announcement Crescent had 100 local employees.

In the first two years after delivering the building three restaurants opened in the building's ground floor retail space. Jinya Ramen Bar opened a 3,520 square feet (327 m^{2}) restaurant in September 2021, Salata Salad Kitchen began leasing 2,500 square feet (230 m^{2}) in October, 2021, and in January 2023 Brown Bag Seafood Co opened its third Charlotte location with a 2,756 square feet (256.0 m^{2}) space in the building

== JW Marriott ==
In January 2018 White Lodging, based in Merrillville, Ind. was announced as developing a 350 hotel on the 3.6-acre lot next to the office tower. Unfortunately, the hotel portion of the lot is not large enough for a convention center hotel, which is usually 800 to 1,000 rooms and could partially subsidized with taxpayer money. The Westin Charlotte with 700 rooms is Charlotte's largest hotel, built in 2003, and it received $16 million in taxpayer funding. After a two-year national search Crescent selected White Lodging because of their ideas about building at the street and its food and beverage program.

White Lodging and Crescent Communities have developed the 22 story, 320,000 square feet (30,000 m^{2}) hotel together. It topped out in June 2020. The hotel opened in August 2021. It is the 7th largest hotel in Charlotte by number of rooms with 381 rooms. JW Marriott is a luxury brand of Marriott International. It features guest rooms, spas, co-working spaces, and bars with outdoor seating.

The hotel features 3 restaurants: Dean's Italian Steakhouse, Caroline's Oyster Bar, and Aura Rooftop Bar. In May 2021, it was announced that 300 people would be hired to staff the restaurants with hired events in early May.

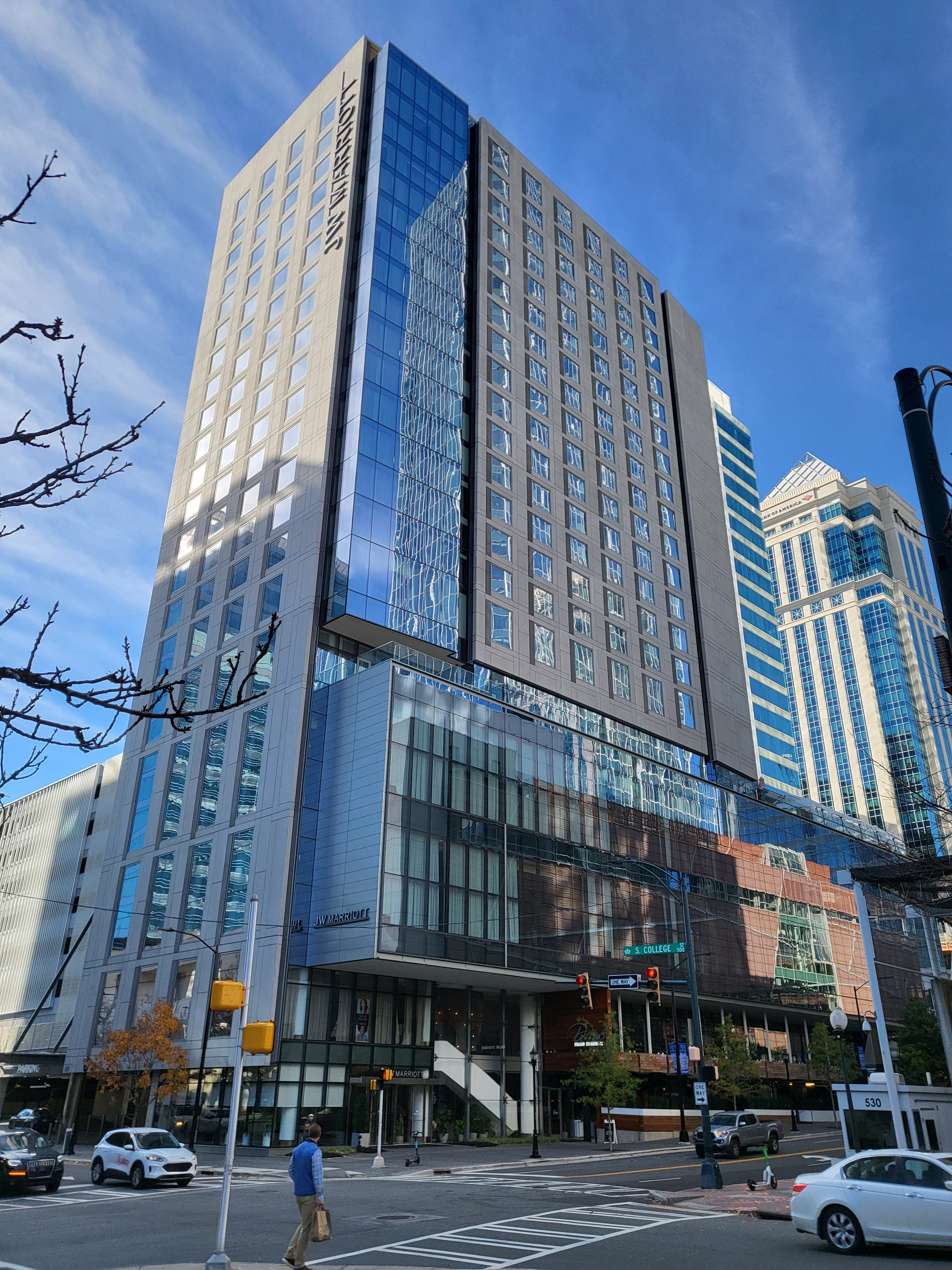
JW Marriott in December 2022

== See also ==
- List of tallest buildings in North Carolina / the United States / the world
- List of tallest buildings in Charlotte
