= 300 South Tryon =

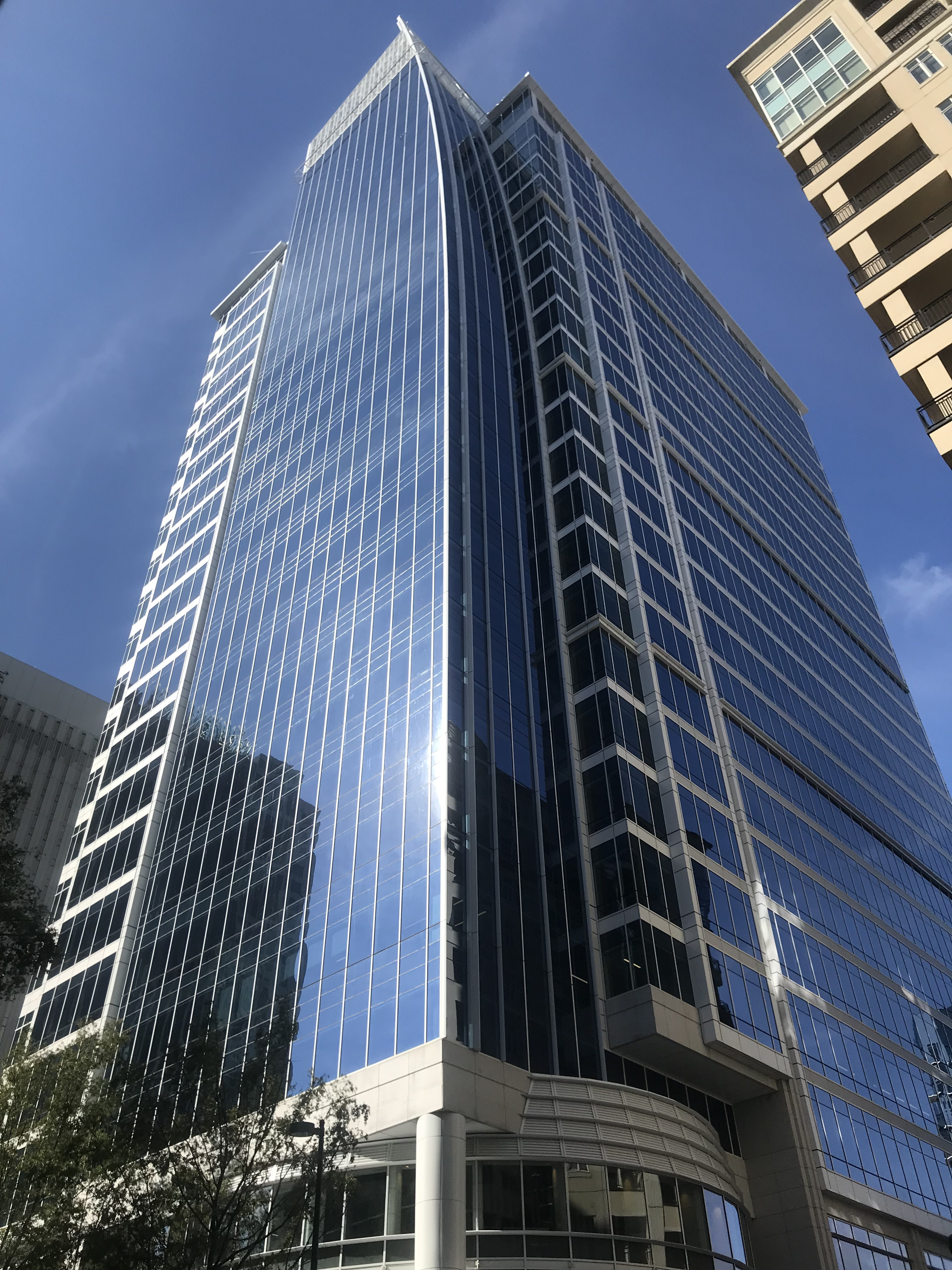

General information
- Status: Completed
- Type: Office, Residential Hotel
- Location: 300 South Tryon Street; Charlotte, NC
- Coordinates: 35.225674°N 80.845771°W
- Construction started: December 16, 2014
- Completed: October, 2017
- Opened: November 17, 2017
- Cost: $330 million

Height
- Roof: 463 feet (141 m)

Technical details
- Floor count: 25 floors
- Floor area: 638,000 square feet (59,300 m^{2})
- Lifts/elevators: 24 floors

Design and construction
- Architect: LS3P
- Developer: The Spectrum Companies

Website
- www.300southtryon.com

300 South Tryon is a high-rise office building in Charlotte, North Carolina. With a height of 463 feet (141 m), it is the 10th tallest building in Charlotte. It was completed in 2017. Ground breaking was on December 15, 2014, and construction was completed on November 16, 2017. 300 South Tryon was built on the last available undeveloped lot on South Tryon and was the first high-rise office building in uptown Charlotte since the end of the Great Recession. The building has 638,000 square feet (59,300 m^{2}) of space including 22,000 square of street level retail space, which makes it the 13th largest building in Charlotte by leasable space.

== Office building ==
In 2007, Spectrum and Cornerstone announced plans for a 32-story building on the site that would feature a mixture of retail, condos, and office space. However, the Great Recession dissolved these plans. An affiliate of Cornerstone Real Estate Advisors held onto the 1.6-acre property after the deal fell through.

Babson Capital announced in May 2014 they were considering moving their headquarters from Springfield, Massachusetts to Charlotte. The existence of Barings came in 2016 as the result of MassMutual merging four asset management companies which included Babson Capital and Baring Asset Management. Babson was then leasing 45,000 square feet (4,200 m^{2}) at Duke Energy Center with 140 employees located there. The Charlotte based part of the company was the institutional debt management arm of First Union Corp, formerly Wachovia, and was acquired by Babson in 2002, at the time of acquisition the division had 17 employees.

Babson Capital agreed to anchor the building and lease 200,000 square feet (19,000 m^{2}). Some of the building's tenants include Elior North America with 13,000 square feet (1,200 m^{2}), Cushman & Wakefield with 16,000 square feet (1,500 m^{2}), Knoll Inc. with 4,000 square feet (370 m^{2}), King & Spalding with 27,000 square feet (2,500 m^{2}), Winston & Strawn with 26,000 square feet (2,400 m^{2}), FCA Partners with 4,000 square feet (370 m^{2}), and CapTech with 12,500 square feet (1,160 m^{2})

In June 2019 DealCloud moved into a 18,000 square feet (1,700 m^{2}) space in the building. The company previously was occupying 6,000 square feet (560 m^{2}) at 129 West Trade. In March 2023 Chicago law firm Seyfarth Shaw signed a lease for 17,829 square feet (1,656.4 m^{2}) of space. In 2019 the firm opened their first Charlotte office by renting 5,000 square feet (460 m^{2}) at 121 West Trade in Uptown.

Ameriprise Financial Inc. announced on May 25, 2023, the company will be creating a new corporate office in Charlotte leasing 53,000 square feet (4,900 m^{2}) across two floors starting in the fall. This office will eventually create 400 jobs. The city of Charlotte was specifically chosen because of its diverse and growing economy.

== Kimpton Tryon Park ==
The hotel is 18 stories with 217 rooms, 9,300 square of meeting space which includes a 4,000 square foot ballroom. The interior a number of pieces of art and a cohesive color theme throughout the hotel. The guests amenities being offered are a mini bar, yoga mats, and complimentary bike rentals. It also features a rooftop bar Merchant & Trade and Italian restaurant Angeline's both opened in November 2017. Angeline's features a main dining area which seats 136, a private room which can accommodate 36, and patio dining. On the hotel rooftop Merchant & Trade features a 4,500 square foot bar and lounge with views of Romare Bearden Park and Truist Field.

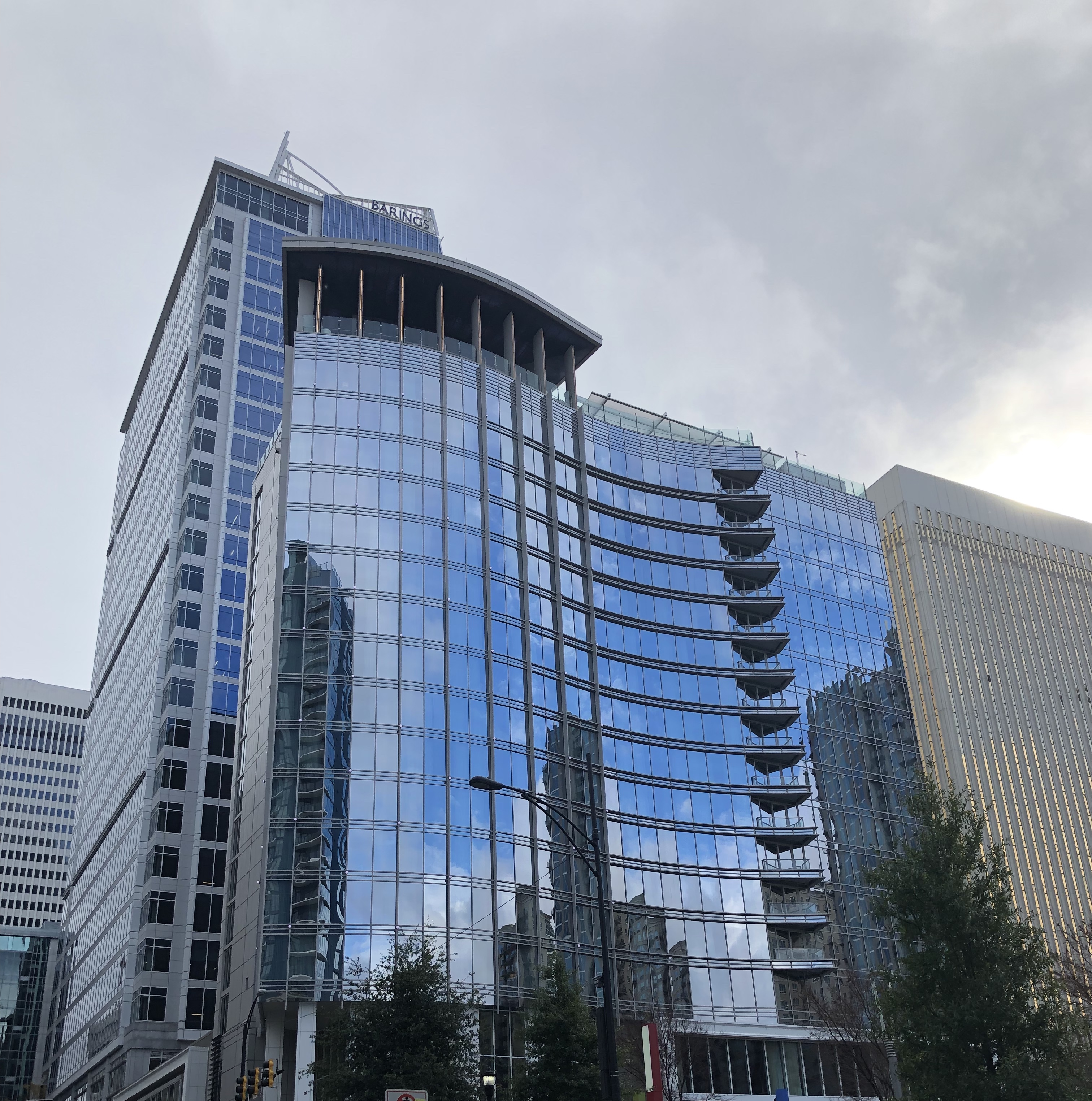
Kimpton Tryon Park hotel

== See also ==
- Barings LLC
- Uptown Charlotte
- List of tallest buildings in North Carolina / the United States / the world
- List of tallest buildings in Charlotte
