= Uptown Charlotte =

Neighborhood and central business district in North Carolina, US

- Neighborhood and central business district
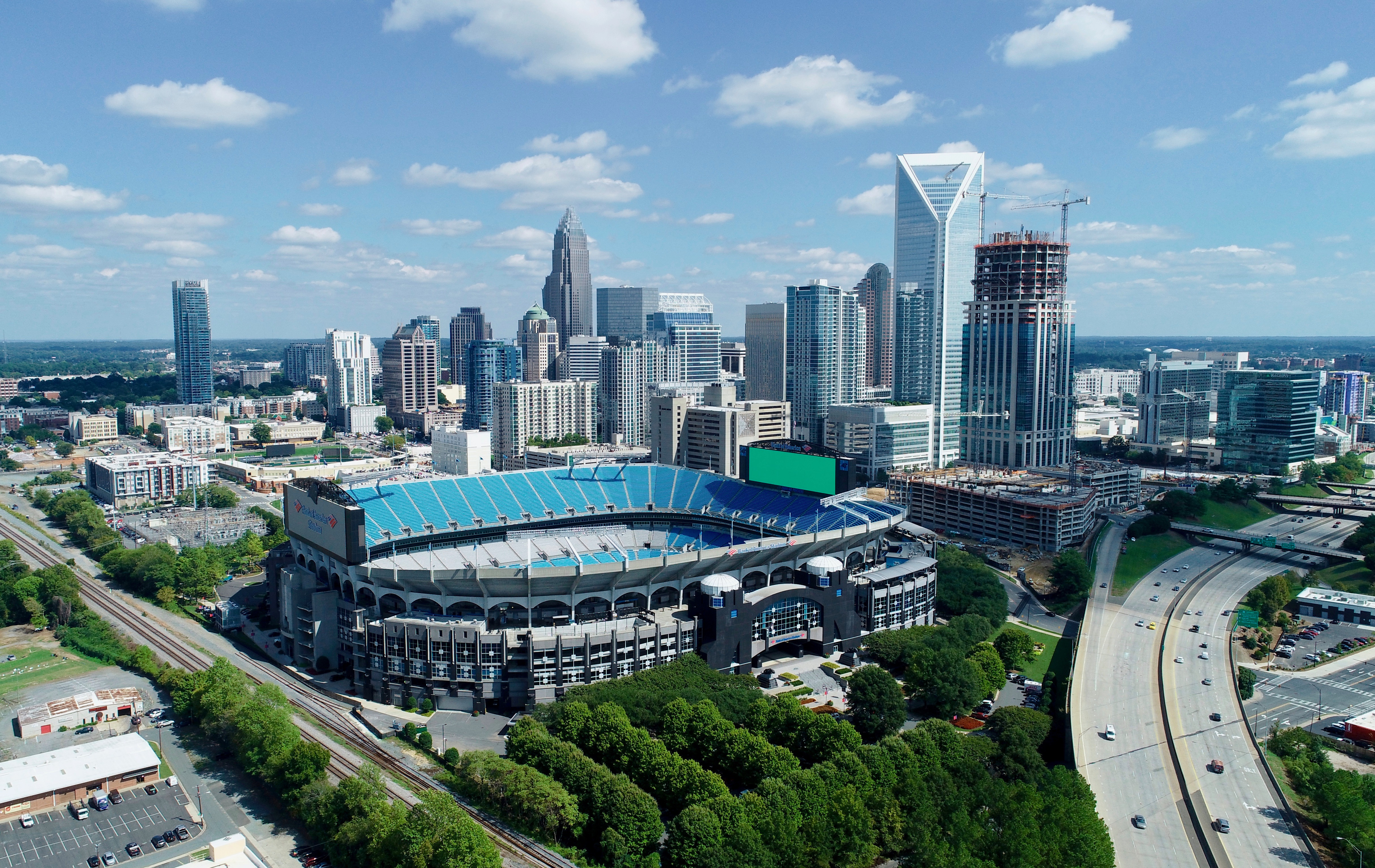
- Uptown Charlotte skyline in 2018
- Nicknames: Uptown, Historic Downtown
- Location in Charlotte
- Coordinates: 35.227°N 80.843°W
- Country: United States
- State: North Carolina
- County: Mecklenburg
- City: Charlotte
- Council districts: 1, 2
- Neighborhood Profile Areas (NPA): 340, 341, 342, 384

Area
  - Total: 2.14 sq mi (5.5 km^{2})

Population (2021)
  - Total: 20,000
  - Density: 9,300/sq mi (3,600/km^{2})
- Zip Codes: 28202, 28204, 28206, 28208
- Area codes: 704 and 980
- Median household income: $59,063
- Website: www.charlottecentercity.org

Uptown Charlotte, also called Center City, is the central business district of Charlotte, North Carolina, United States. The area is split into four wards by the intersection of Trade and Tryon Streets, and bordered by Interstate 277 and Interstate 77. The area is managed and overseen by the Charlotte Central City Partners, which is one of the three Municipal Service Districts in Charlotte. Uptown Charlotte is the largest business district in Charlotte and the Carolinas.

Several Fortune 500 companies have their headquarters in the district, including Bank of America, Duke Energy, Honeywell, and the east coast operations of Wells Fargo. Uptown contains over 33 million square feet of office space. Athletic and event facilities located in Center City include Bank of America Stadium, Spectrum Center, Truist Field, and the NASCAR Hall of Fame. Museums, theaters, hotels, high-density residential developments, restaurants, and bars are heavily concentrated in the Center City, with over 245 restaurants and 50 nightspots.

== Name origins ==
Charlotte's central business district is referred to as "Uptown" by locals, although the term "Downtown" is understood and used by native Charlotteans since it references the same area of the city. There is some confusion brought about by the use of the terms "Uptown" and "Downtown" for Charlotte's center city area. The term "Up-Town", referring to the geographic location of Tryon and Trade Street—"uptown" actually does sit at a higher elevation than the rest of the city—was recorded as early as 1895 in the Charlotte Observer but fell out of use around 1929 for reasons unknown. The term "Downtown" was commonly used up until the mid-1970s by residents, media, and city leaders for the Center City. In 1973, a massive campaign was launched by local businessman Jack Wood to revamp the image of the downtown area and embrace the historic and arguably uniquely Charlotte term "Uptown" by reintroducing it to the general public. In September 1974 Charlotte City Council passed an official proclamation that said "The heart of Charlotte should be now and forever more known as Uptown Charlotte." On February 14, 1987, the Charlotte Observer began using the term "Uptown" as a way to promote a more positive upbeat image of the Center City area. School teachers were provided with "historical" documents justifying use of the term to teach to students.

== Major streets ==
=== Tryon Street ===
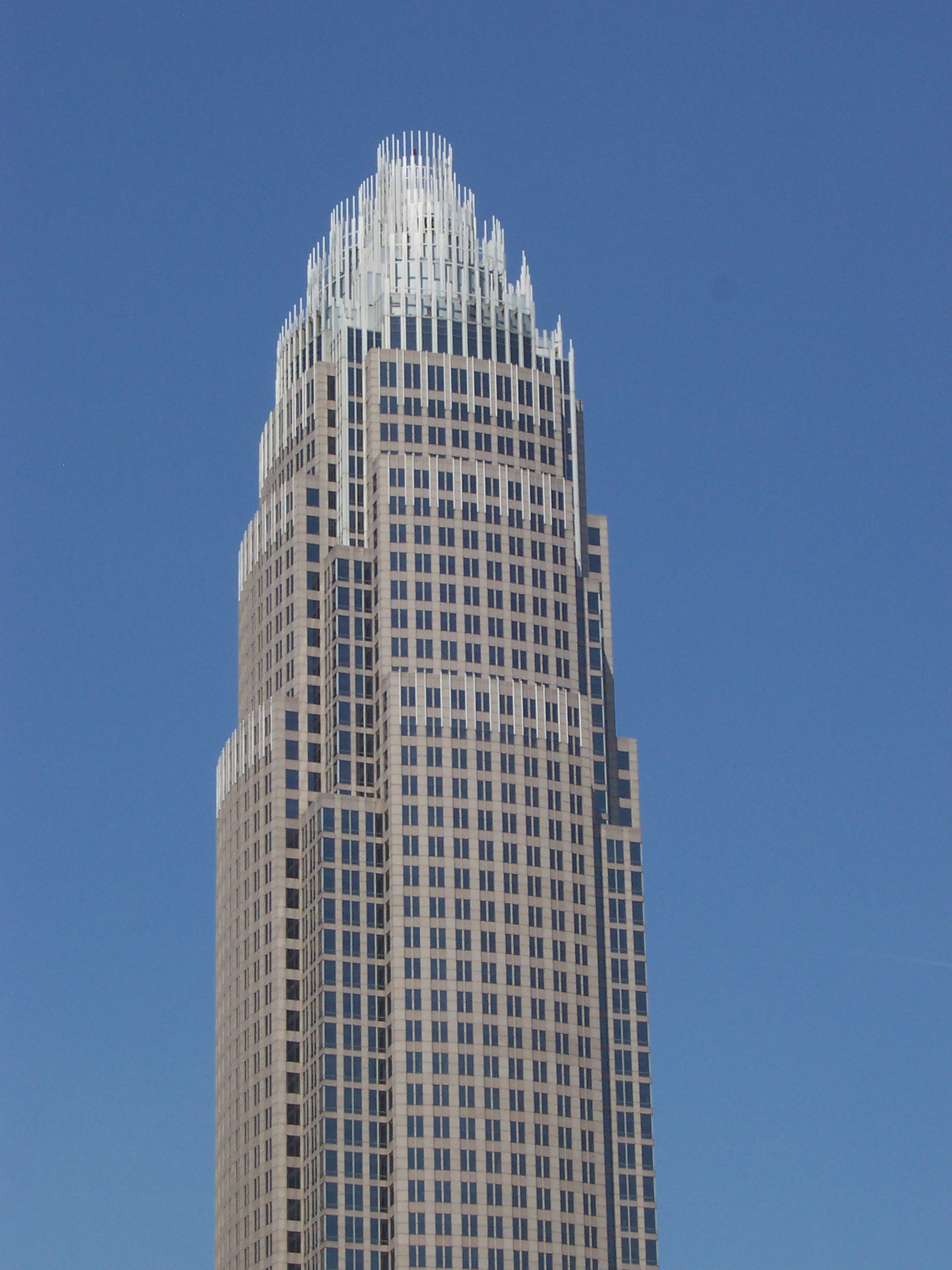
Located at 100 North Tryon Street in Charlotte, the Bank of America Corporate Center stands 871 ft tall and is the 118th tallest building in the world.

Tryon Street was named after William Tryon, governor of the Province of North Carolina from 1765 to 1771. A major southwest–northeast thoroughfare across Charlotte, it follows NC 49 southeast of the Uptown neighborhood, and US 29 northwest of Uptown. Within the Uptown Charlotte street grid (which is skewed about 45 degrees from compass directions), Tryon forms the boundary between streets labeled "East" and "West". Many of the tallest buildings in Charlotte have a Tryon Street address including:

- Bank of America Corporate Center
- One South at The Plaza
- 550 South Tryon
- Truist Center
- Fifth Third Center
- 400 South Tryon
- 525 North Tryon
- 200 South Tryon
- 300 South Tryon
- 112 Tryon Plaza
- South Tryon Square
- Legacy Union
- Two Wells Fargo Center
- 201 South Tryon

Independence Square is the intersection of Tryon and Trade streets, both of which were major Native American trading paths. The city grew around this intersection, and each corner has a bronze statue representing one of four major industries, Commerce, Industry, Transportation and The Future. The 5000-pound 25-foot statues, each on a granite pedestal, were created by Raymond Kaskey and given to the city by the philanthropic group the Queen's Table in the mid-1990s.

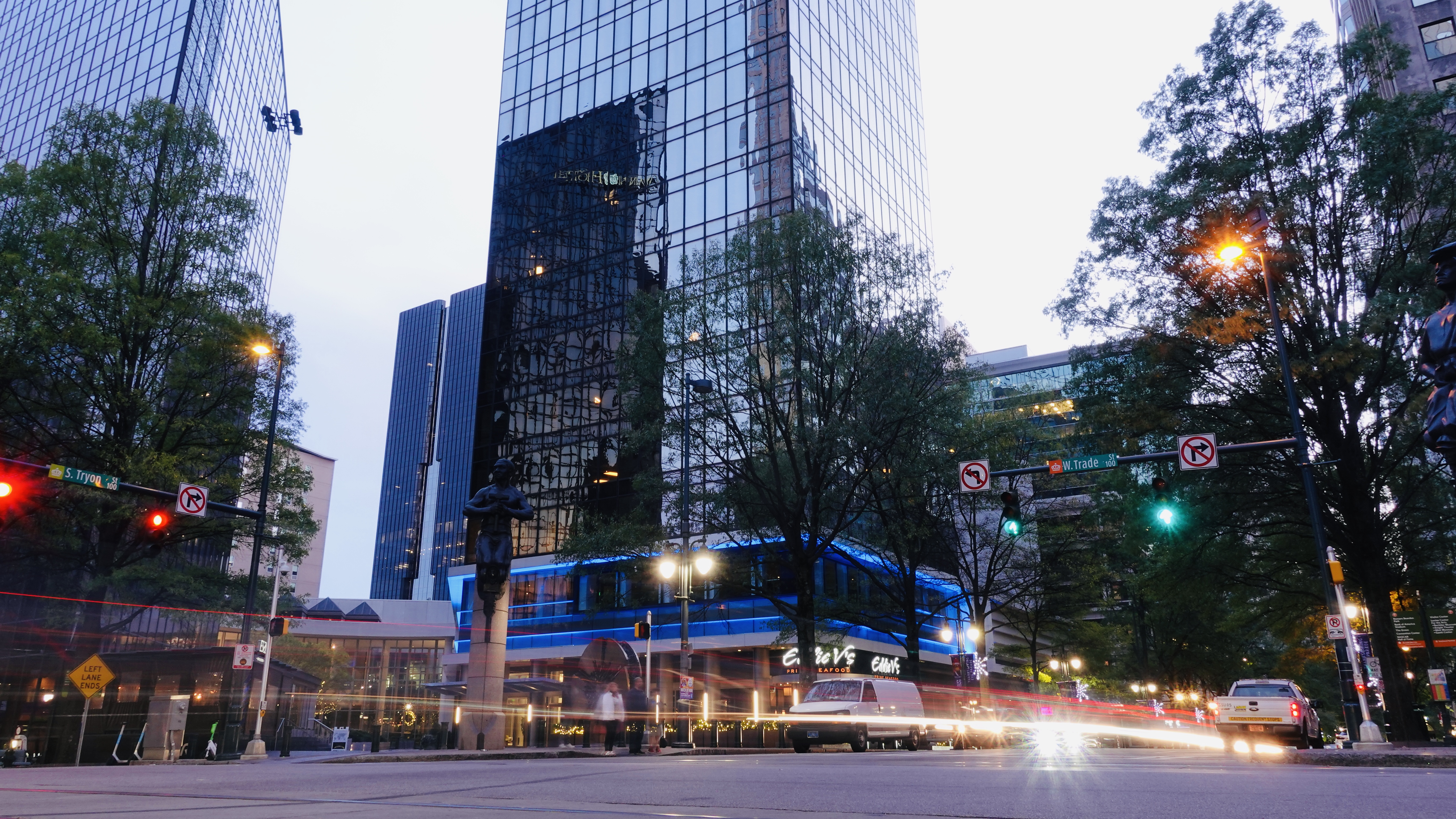
Independence Square—Intersection of Trade and Tryon Streets

=== Trade Street ===
Trade Street begins as a continuation of Elizabeth Street near the southeastern boundary of Uptown, and continues as a major thoroughfare northwest through the rest of the city. It serves as the division between "North" and "South" labeled streets within the Uptown street grid. The following major buildings have a Trade Street address:

- 121 West Trade
- 129 West Trade
- Carillon Tower

=== College Street ===
Buildings which have a College Street address include:

- 301 South College
- Charlotte Plaza
- Regions 615
- 200 South College

== Neighborhoods ==
Uptown Charlotte is divided into four neighborhoods, or "wards", by the intersection of Trade and Tryon Streets.

=== First Ward ===
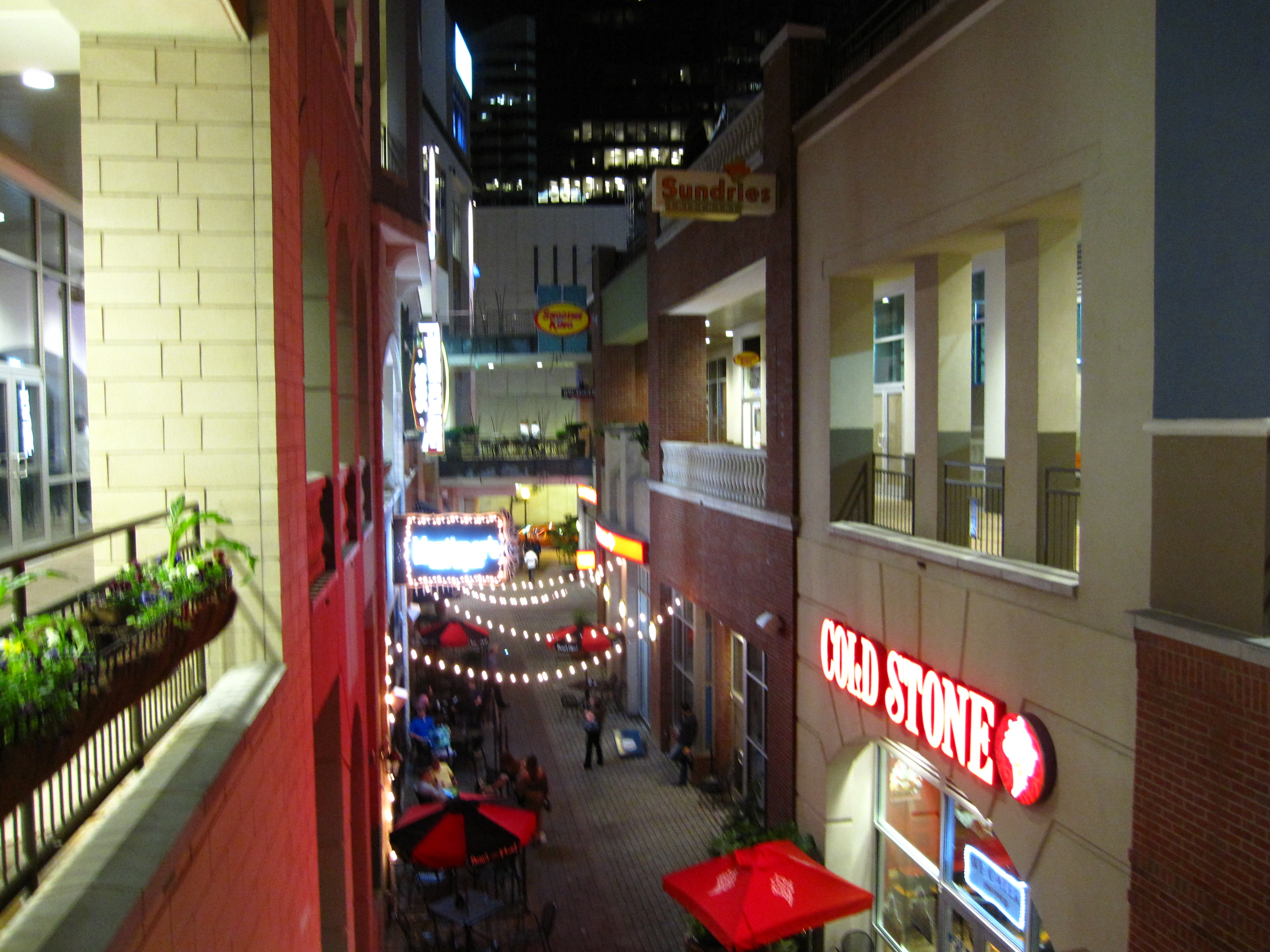
Queen City Quarter (formerly known as the Epicentre) is a popular shopping and nightlife destination in downtown.

The first ward lies directly to the east of the intersection of Trade and Tryon. It is that quadrant bounded by North Tryon on the northwest and East Trade on the southwest.

Once considered one of the most dangerous areas in Charlotte, the first ward has become one of the more desirable because of gentrification under a HUD HOPE VI grants with many new developments under construction. The award-winning Center City Building which houses the uptown campus of the University of North Carolina at Charlotte is in the first ward. The Center City Building is 11 stories and was completed in 2011. it includes 25 state of the art classrooms, design studios, meeting space, and performance spaces. The urban village includes a 4-acre (16,000 m^{2}) park, which was completed in December 2015, 4,600,000 sq ft (430,000 m^{2}) of office space, 1,182 residential units, 250 hotel rooms, and 192,000 sq ft (17,800 m^{2}) of retail space. Current attractions include the Main Library, the Spirit Square portion of the North Carolina Blumenthal Performing Arts Center, ImaginOn Children's Learning Center, Levine Museum of the New South, and Spectrum Center (home of the Charlotte Hornets).

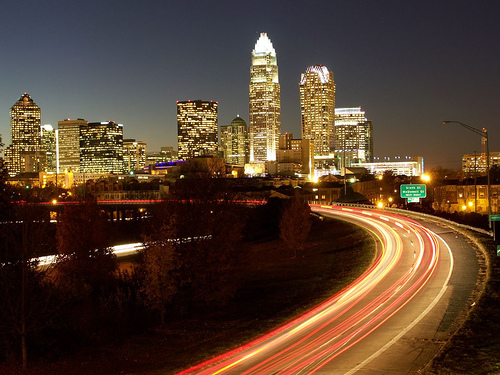
2008 view from the Central Avenue bridge

=== Second Ward ===
The second ward lies directly to the south of the intersection of Trade and Tryon. It is the quadrant bounded by South Tryon on the northwest and East Trade on the northeast. Second Ward is the hospitality center of Uptown with about half of the hotel rooms in Uptown and it is an important employment center as well. It includes 7,700,000 sq ft (720,000 m^{2}) of office space, 840 residential units, 3,682 hotel rooms with 1,136 additional rooms under construction, and 518,000 sq ft (48,100 m^{2}) of retail space. It is the location of Charlotte's "Government District" and is the site of the NASCAR Hall of Fame. The second ward was formerly the location of the predominantly black neighborhood, Brooklyn, before an urban renewal project took place. Today, second ward is home to Queen City Quarter, a mixed-use entertainment and retail complex; the Charlotte Convention Center; the Victorian Gothic style St. Peter's Catholic Church; The Green, a downtown mini-park; and the Harvey B. Gantt Center for African-American Art+Culture (named for Harvey Gantt). Duke Energy also has its corporate headquarters in the second ward.

=== Third Ward ===
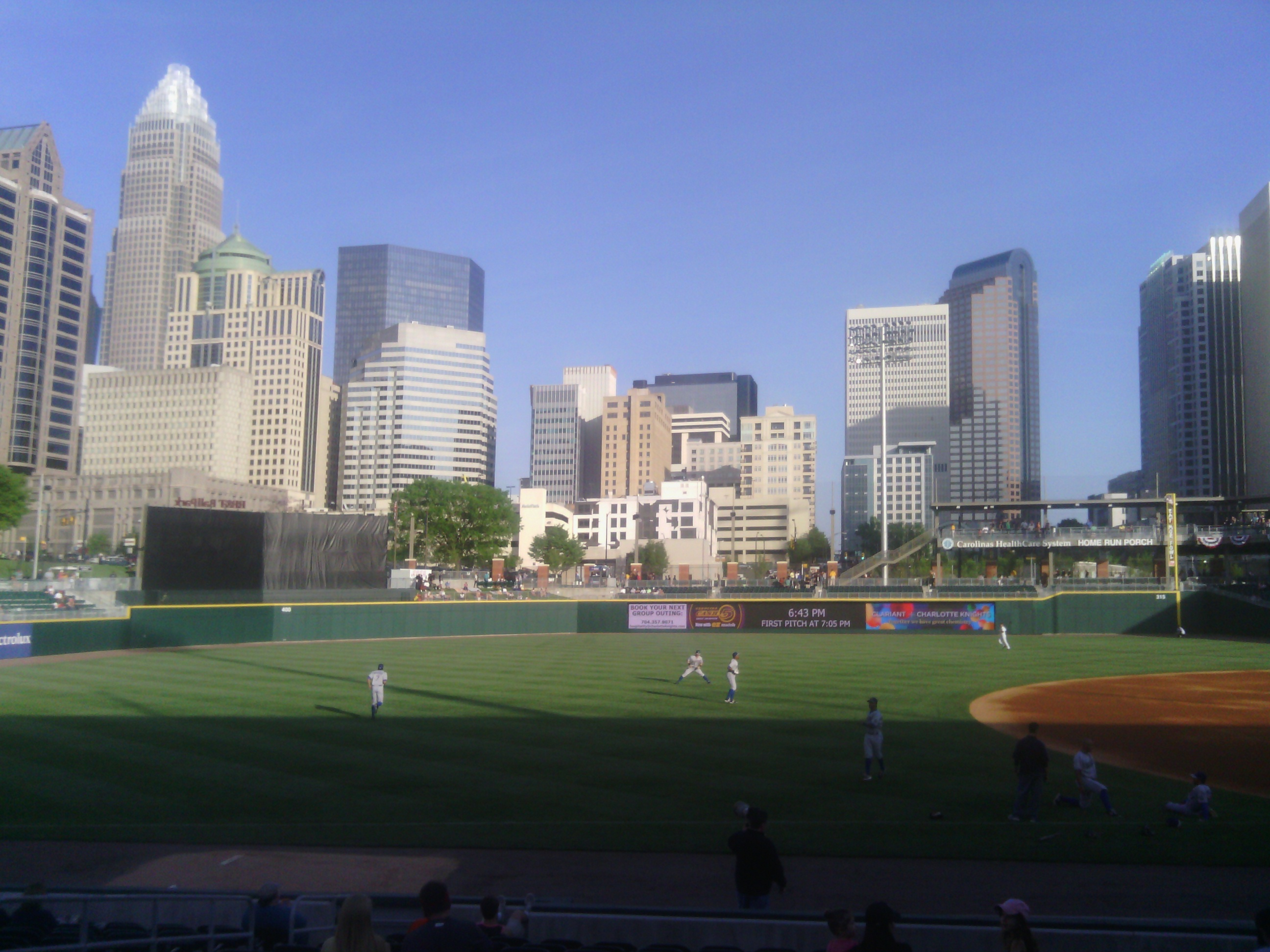
The Uptown skyline viewed from Truist Field in 2014

The third ward lies directly to the west of the intersection of Trade and Tryon. It is the quadrant bounded by South Tryon on the southeast and West Trade on the northeast. It is the Ward that house a lot of the entertainment and culture attractions in Uptown which include Knight Theatre, the Mint Museum, and the Bechtler Museum of Modern Art, the Carolina Panthers' and Charlotte FC's Bank of America Stadium, Truist Field, home of the Charlotte Knights, opened in 2014, Romare Bearden Park, which opened in September 2013, and Gateway Village. Gateway Village, one of the state's largest mixed-use developments, is 1.5 million sq ft (140,000 m^{2}) in size, and home to offices, shops, restaurants, entertainment venues and over 500 housing units. Johnson & Wales University's Charlotte campus is located directly across from Gateway Village, with Johnson C. Smith University's campus located adjacent. Third ward is also the site of the upcoming Gateway Station transportation hub, which began construction in July 2018. The Gateway Station will house a Greyhound bus stop, an Amtrak station, LYNX Silver Line, and a Charlotte Area Transit System (CATS) bus hub. Overall the Ward includes 7,600,000 sq ft (710,000 m^{2}) of office space, 4,397 residential units, 367 hotel rooms, and 150,000 sq ft (14,000 m^{2}) of retail space.

=== Fourth Ward ===
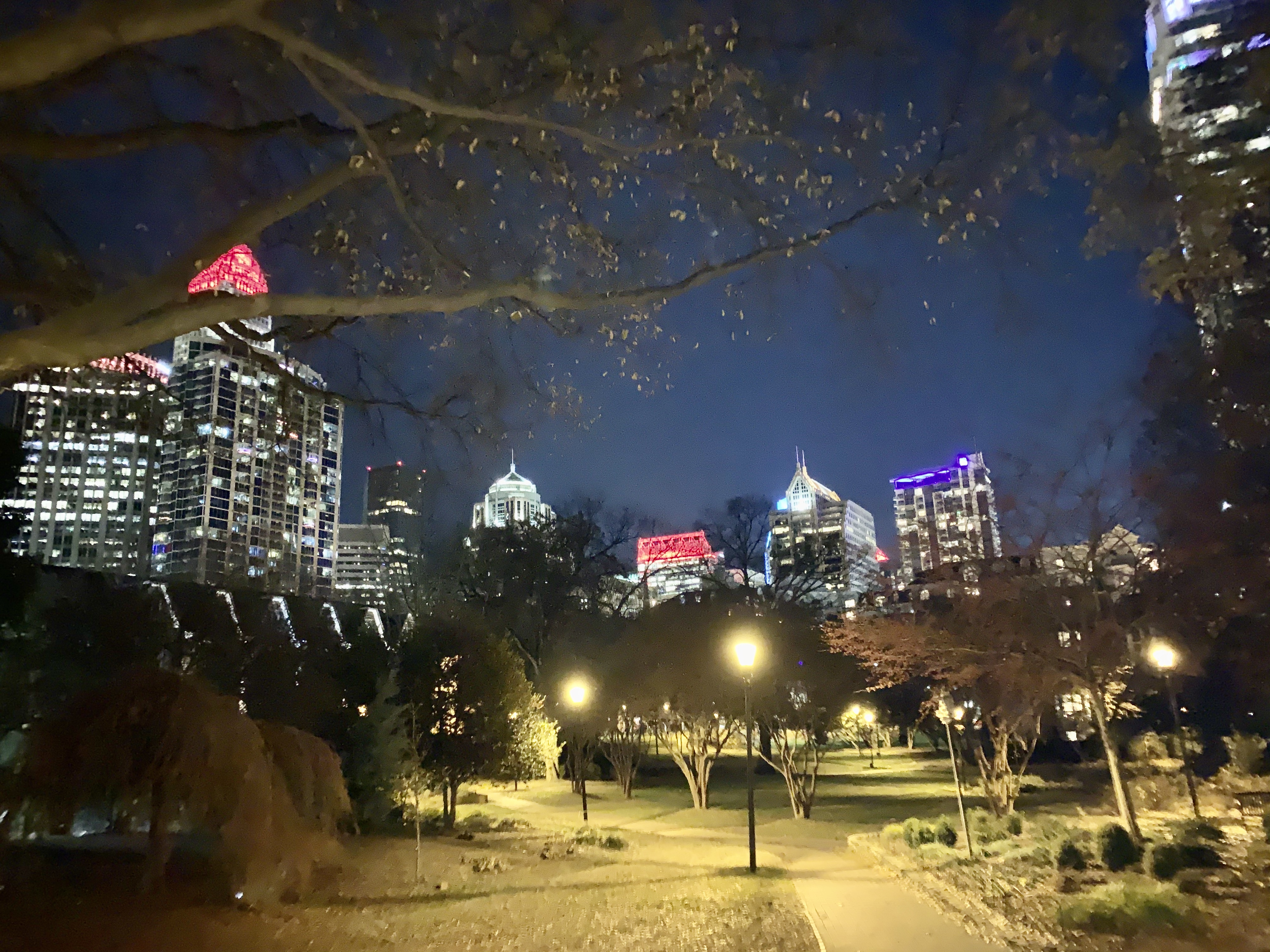
Fourth Ward

The fourth ward lies directly to the north of the intersection of Trade and Tryon. It is that quadrant bounded by North Tryon on the southeast and West Trade on the southwest.

It is mostly residential and has many stately Victorian homes. It is an official historic district, and is the location of Old Settlers' Cemetery and the three-acre Fourth Ward Park. It is a blend of historic residential neighborhoods, modern restaurants, and an employment center. The Ward includes 380,000 sq ft (35,000 m^{2}) of office space, 4,844 residential units, 731 hotel rooms, and 52,000 sq ft (4,800 m^{2}) of retail space.

== Economy ==
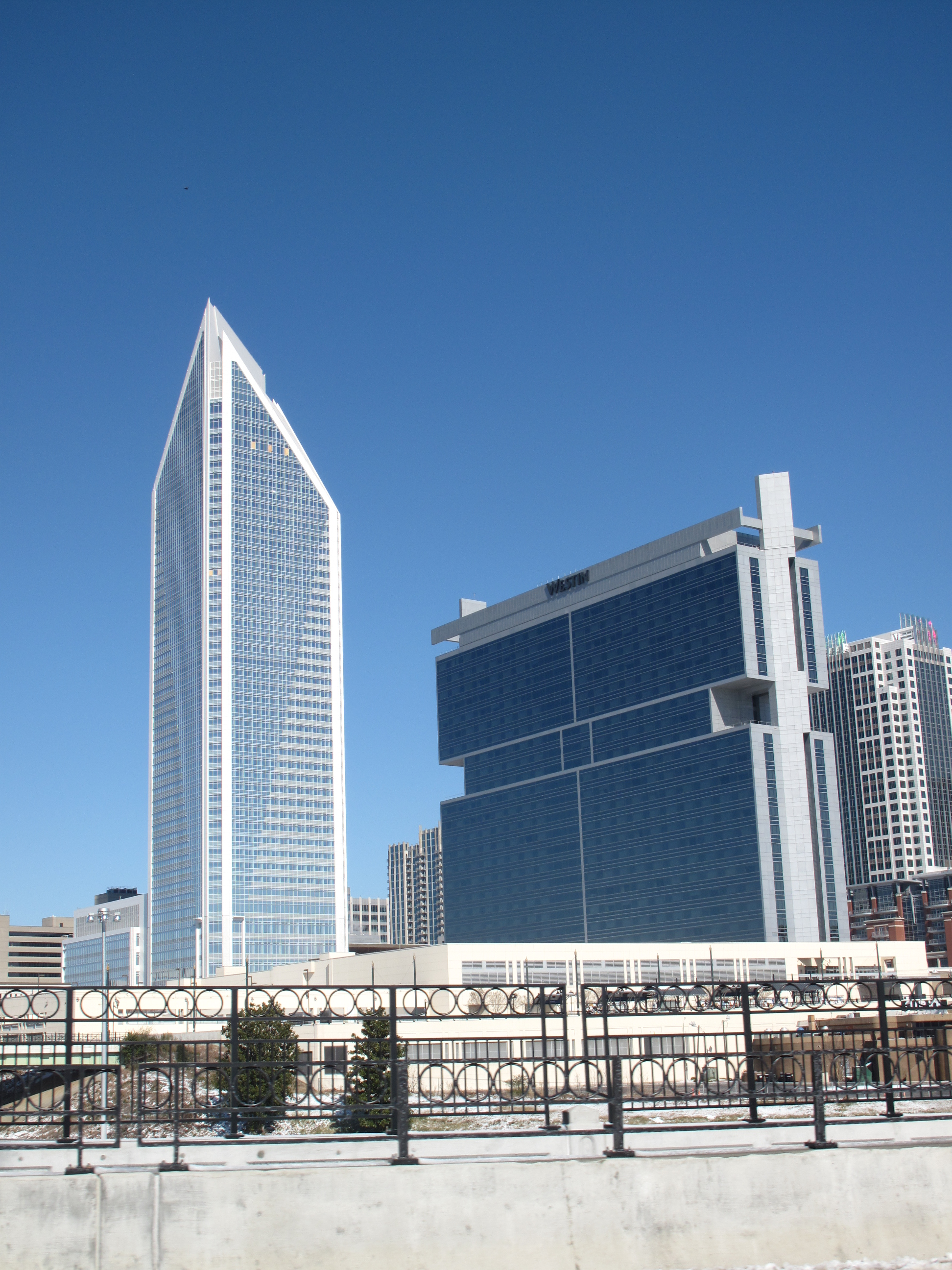
550 South Tryon and The Westin Charlotte

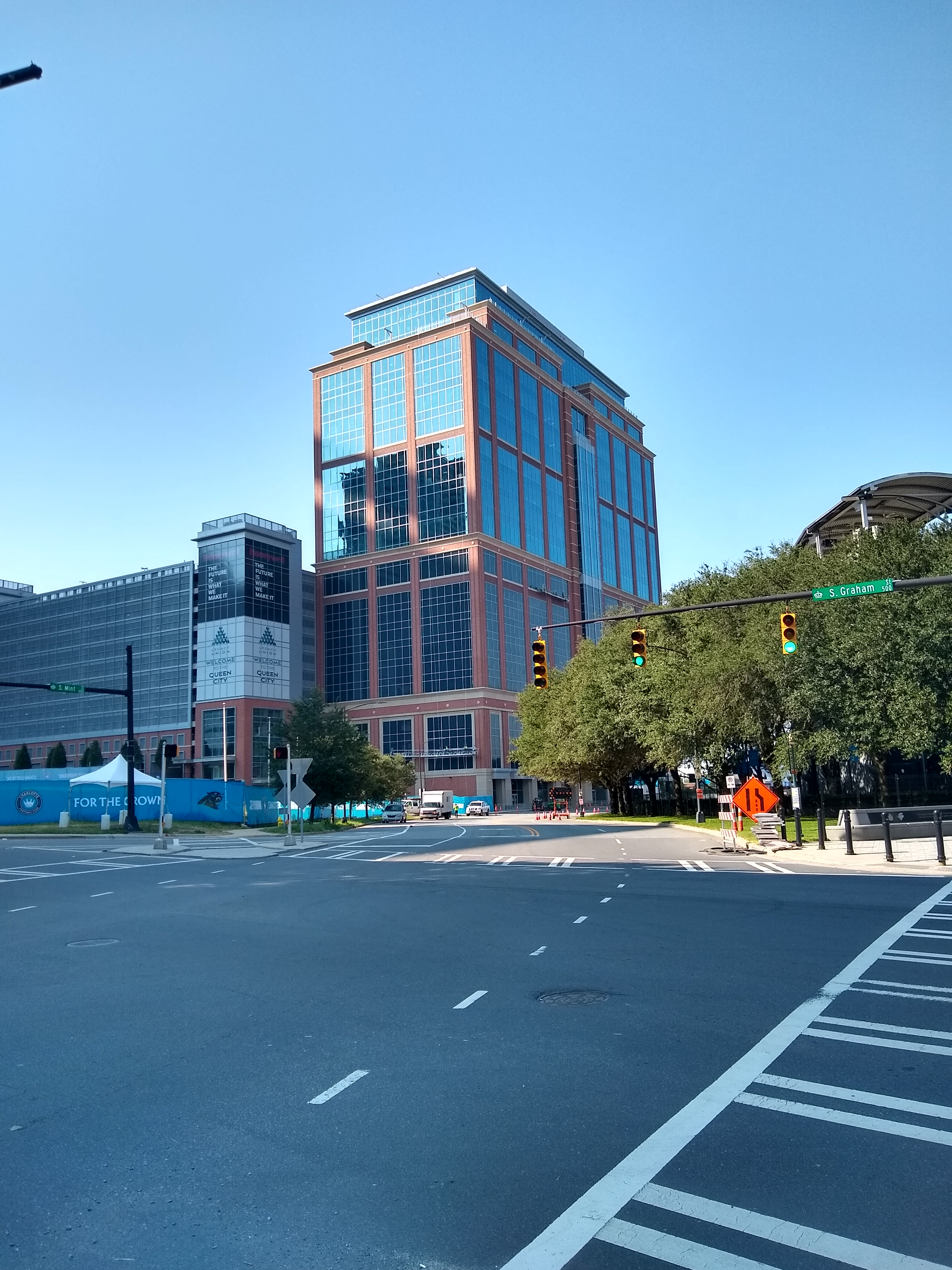
The Honeywell Tower, Honeywell's Global headquarters

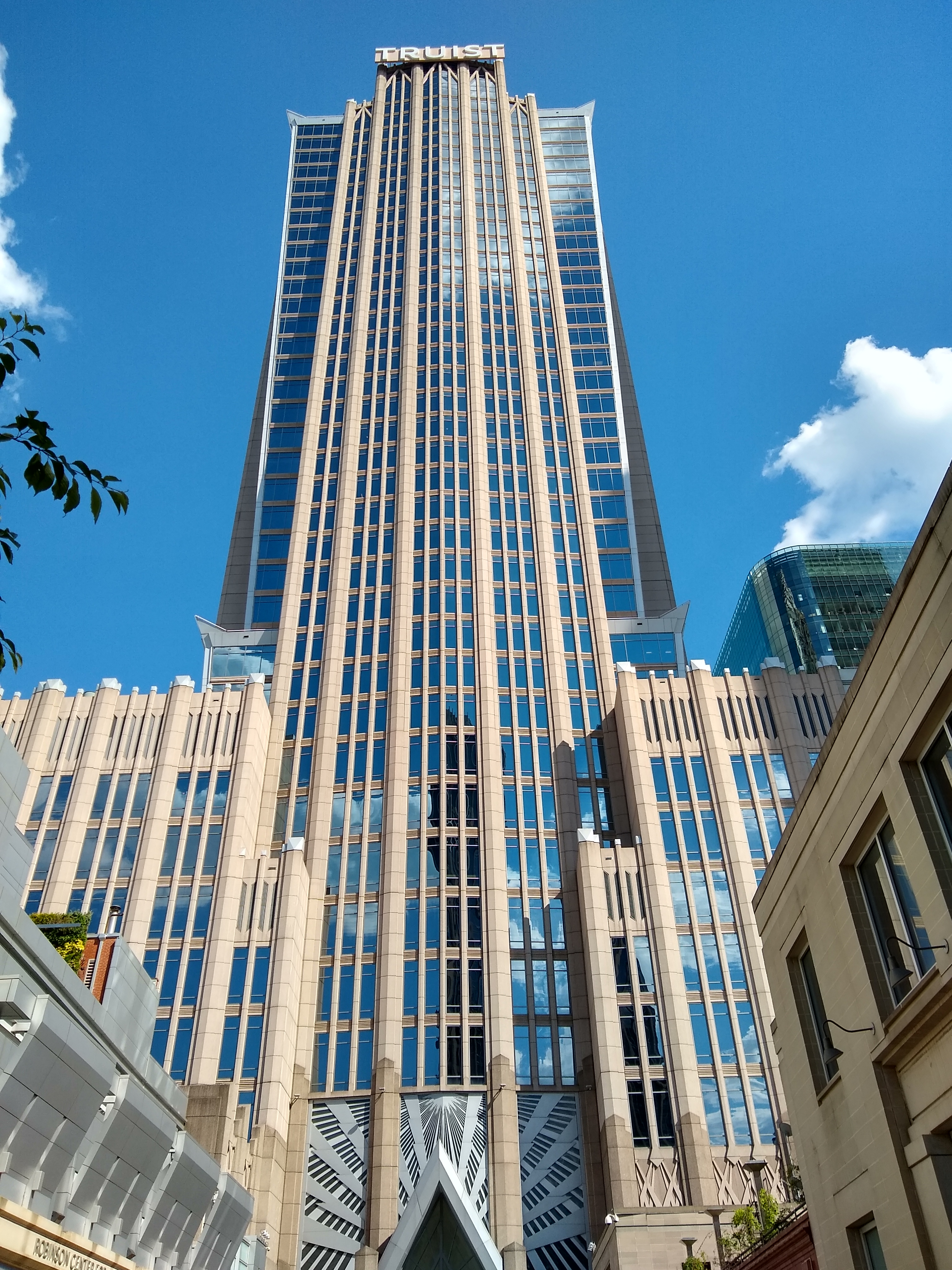
Truist Center, Truist Financial's headquarters in Charlotte

As of 2021 Uptown Charlotte employs 120,000 people across 33 million square feet of office space, hosts more than 18 million visitors a year, and is home to 35,000 residents.

Charlotte is the second largest banking center in the country behind New York City. This determination is made by the dollar amount of assets held by banks headquartered in the city. The current banks with headquarters in the city are Bank of America with $2.8 trillion in assets as of 2020 and Truist Financial with $509 billion in assets as of 2020. Both banks have their headquarters in Uptown, with Bank of America's headquarters at 100 North Tryon Bank of America Corporate Center and Truist's headquarters at 214 North Tryon Truist Center. Uptown has also become a hub of large bank employment bases. Wells Fargo, whose Charlotte presence was Wachovia prior to being acquired by Wells Fargo, occupies numerous buildings in Uptown including 550 South Tryon, 301 South College, Two Wells Fargo Center, Three Wells Fargo Center, and 300 South Brevard. Other banks that have a large employment base in Uptown are Ally Financial with 2,100 employees located in Ally Charlotte Center and U.S. Bank with 860 employees located in Truist Center.

=== Companies with headquarters in Uptown ===
- Bank of America
- Truist Financial
- Wells Fargo East Coast operations
- Duke Energy
- Barings
- Honeywell
- Dole Food Company
- NASCAR
- Atlantic Coast Conference
- Passport

=== Companies with large corporate presence in Uptown ===
- U.S. Bank
- Ally Financial
- FNB Corporation
- Deloitte
- The Bank of London

== Hotels ==
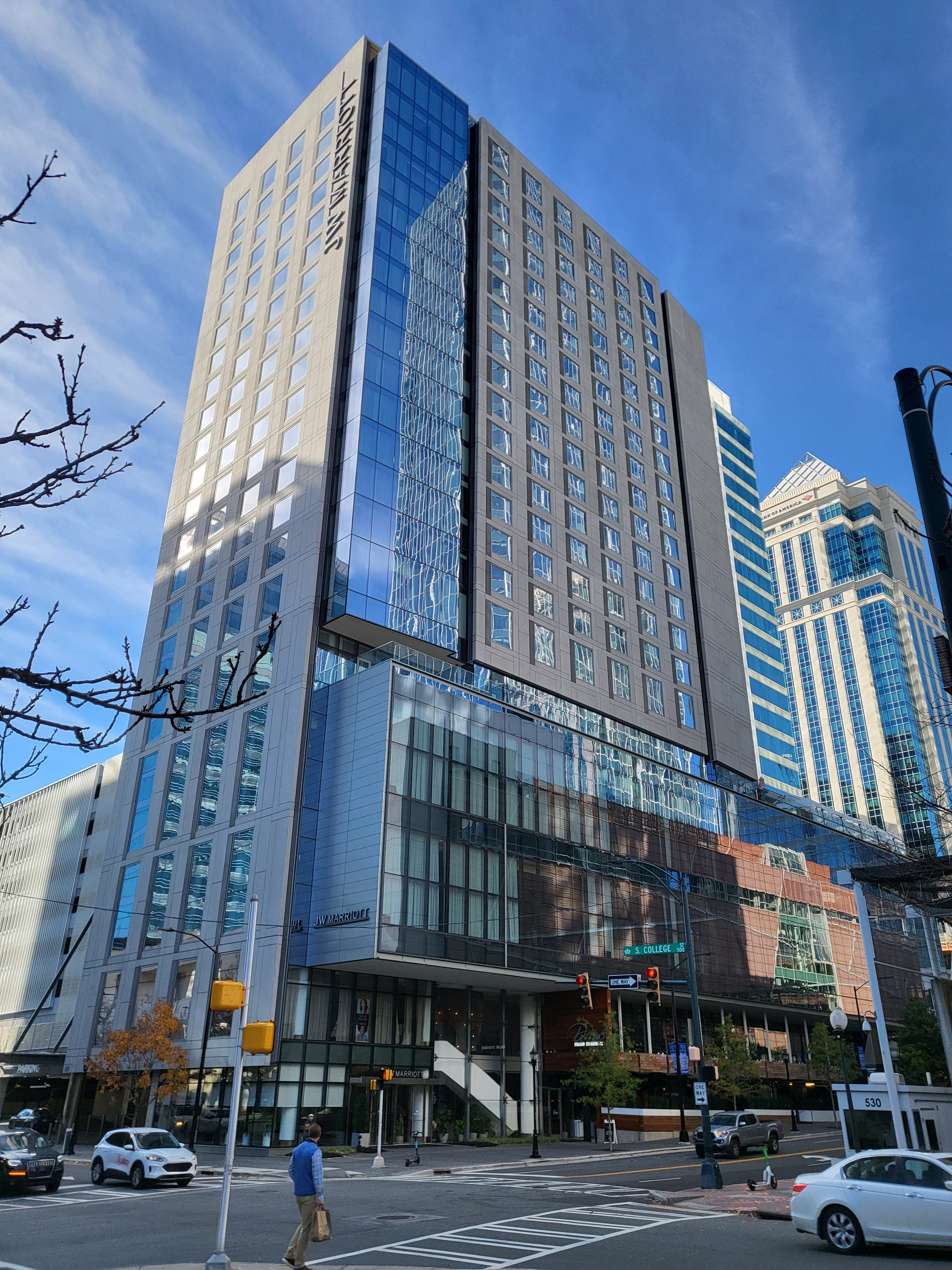
JW Marriott Charlotte

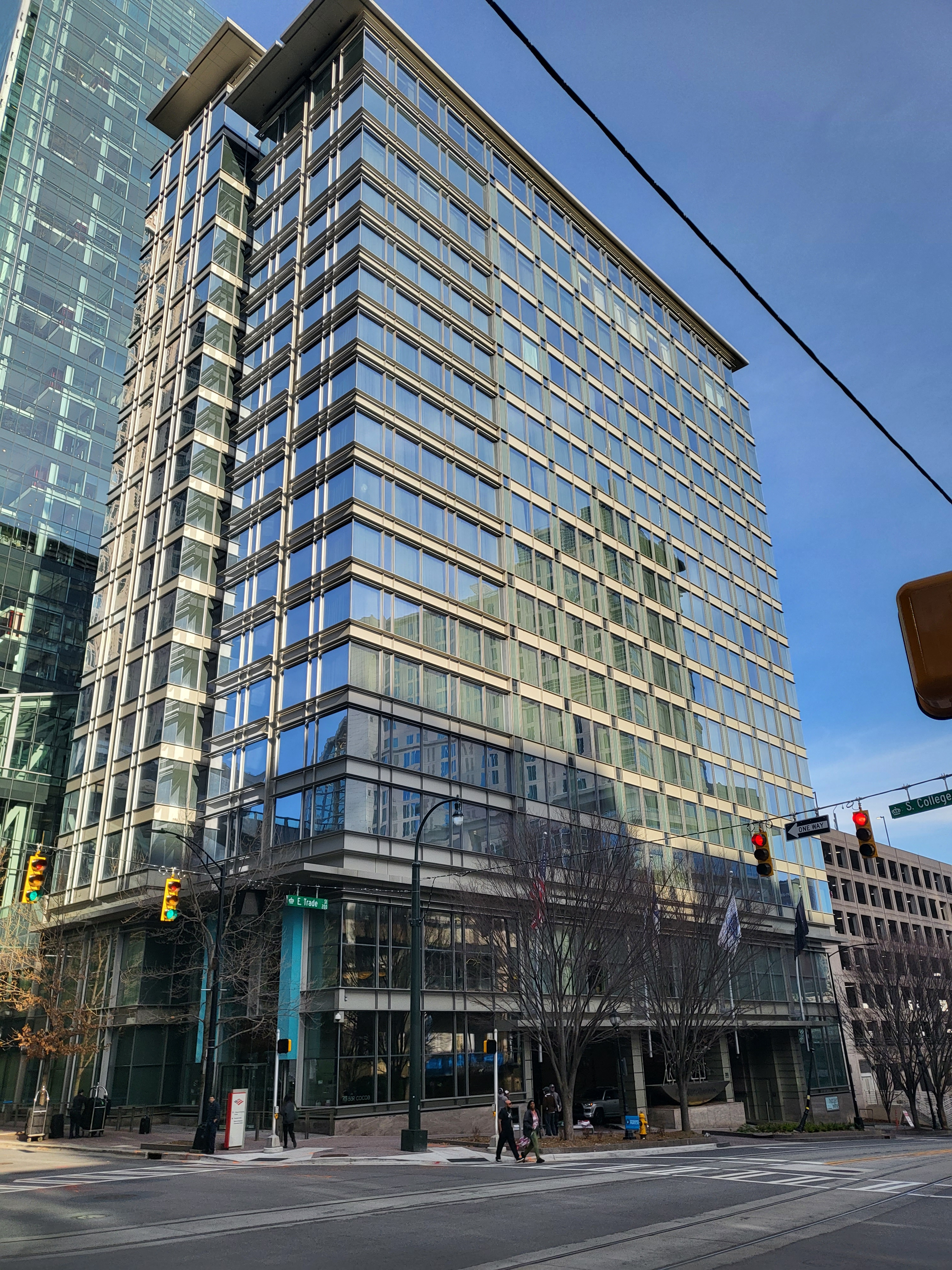
The Ritz-Carlton

Uptown currently as of 2026 has 6,996 existing hotel rooms with 1,168 rooms planned. The hotels planned or under construction include the Intercontinental Hotel at Belk Place with 244 rooms, Brooklyn Village with 280 rooms, Johnston building hotel redevelopment with 245 rooms, 400 South Tryon redevelopment by Spandrel Development Partners with 200 rooms, and 301 South Tryon redevelopment by Riverside Development with 200 rooms.

Uptown needs more hotel rooms within walking distance from the Convention Center to attract more world class events. Also, a lack of hotel rooms is what NFL Commissioner Roger Goodell cited as what is keeping Charlotte from hosting a Super Bowl. Charlotte's current hotel rooms count is fewer than its competitors for conventions. One step the city is taking to change this a land swap with developer Millennium Venture Capital. The city will give MVC 1.9 acres of its property at 501 S. Caldwell St. in exchange for 0.7 acres at 401 S College, which is located next to the Charlotte Convention Center. MVC closed on this 2.3 acre lot on December 16, 2022. The land may be used for a convention center hotel of 800 to 1,000 rooms. However, the city is unwilling to offer any public incentive for the hotel.

== Construction boom ==
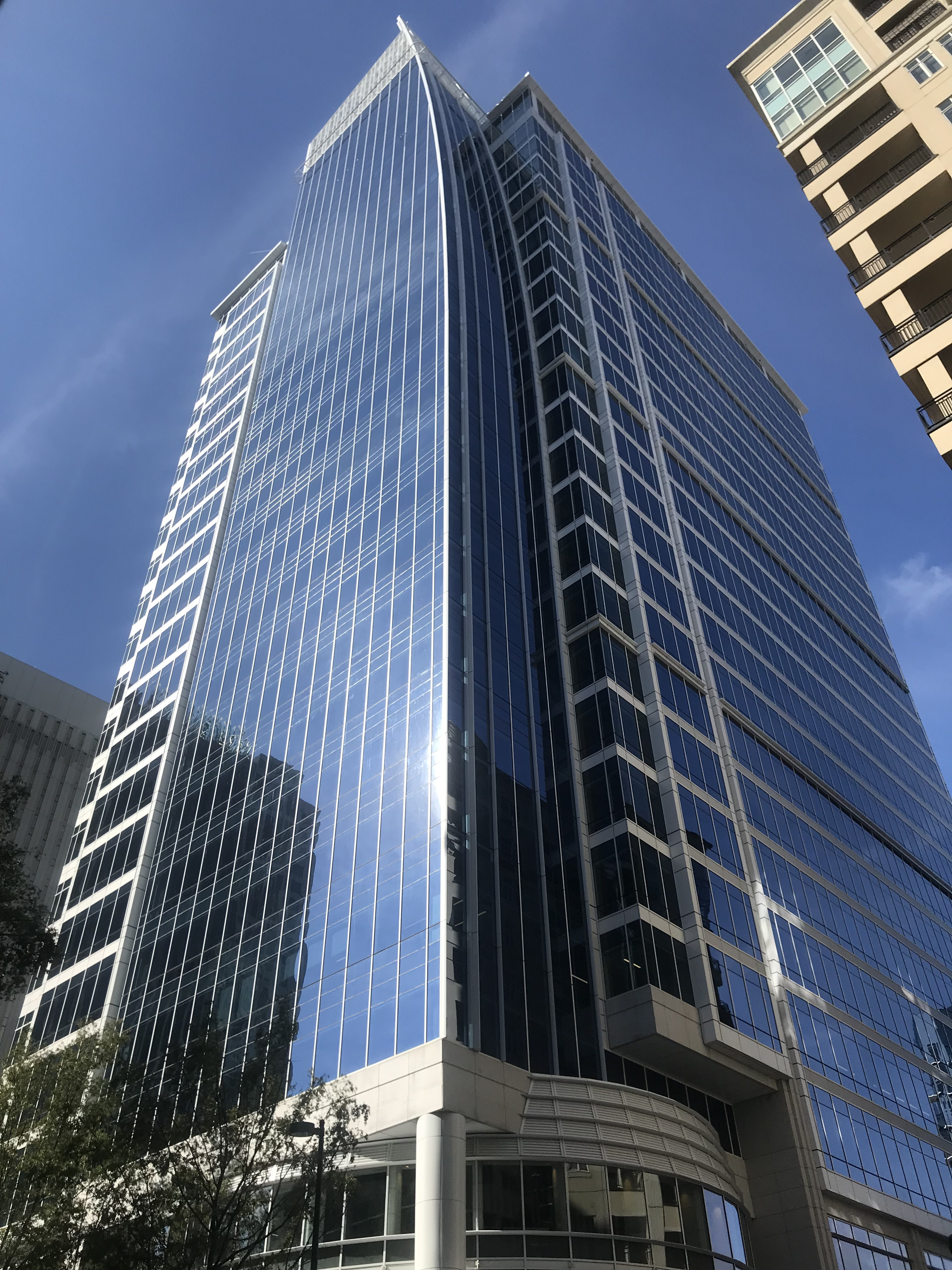
300 South Tryon

Due to the Great Recession's effect on Charlotte construction in Uptown was at a virtual stand still between 2010 and 2014. The ground breaking of 300 South Tryon began a building boom in Uptown. Between 2000 and 2010 6 million square feet of office space was added to Uptown. In 2019 6.9 million square feet of office space was under construction or planned, 8,458 housing units were under construction or planned, 2,310 hotel rooms were under construction or planned, 948,167 square feet of retail was under construction or planned. This pipeline includes a number of projects such as the Duke Energy Plaza, Seventh and Tryon which is part of the North Tryon Vision project, 10 Tryon, Ally Charlotte Center, JW Marriott Charlotte, FNB Tower, 650 S. Tryon, The Ellis, 500 W. Trade. Unfortunately three hotels have stalled due to the COVID-19 pandemic they are the Moxy Hotel, Intercontinental Hotel at Belk Place, and the Hotel at The Ellis.

Companies consolidating real estate has been a major factor in new commercial construction. Three such buildings that are a part of real estate consolidation are Ally Charlotte Center, Duke Energy Plaza, and the Bank of America Tower each is building a bigger building to unite at least two offices under the same roof. In the case of Ally Charlotte Center and Duke Energy Plaza it is at least 4 offices. Part of the consolidation efforts have been brought up by adopting a hybrid model of work after returning from the COVID-19 pandemic where most workers will work part time or full time from home. Obviously a smaller real estate foot print is needed. Duke Energy specifically is aiming to cuts its real estate foot print from 2.5 million square feet to 1 million by 2050.

One of the areas of Uptown that has seen the most development since 2015 to 2021 is the Stonewall Corridor which runs along Stonewall Street (known as Brooklyn Village Avenue since 2022) and next to I-277 South from McDowell St to Bank of America Stadium. The primary reason for the boom of the corridor is the abundance of land along the former Stonewall Street. After the I-277 interchanges were shrunk 5 big parcels of land each at least 2 acres were available on the north side of I-277. One of the first new buildings on Stonewall to start the building boom was Regions 615 which delivered in the Spring of 2017 Since then others have included the Bank of America Tower completed in early 2019, Honeywell Tower began construction in September 2019, Ally Charlotte Center delivered in May 2021 and many other buildings.

== Education ==
=== Elementary, Middle and High schools ===
- Brookstone Schools
- First Ward Creative Arts Academy
- Charlotte Lab School
- Metro School
- Trinity Episcopal School
- Charlotte Montessori School

=== Colleges and universities ===
- Johnson and Wales University, Charlotte campus
- University of North Carolina at Charlotte, Uptown campus
- Johnson C. Smith University
- Central Piedmont Community College
- Wake Forest University School of Business, Charlotte campus
- Northeastern University, Charlotte campus

=== Libraries ===
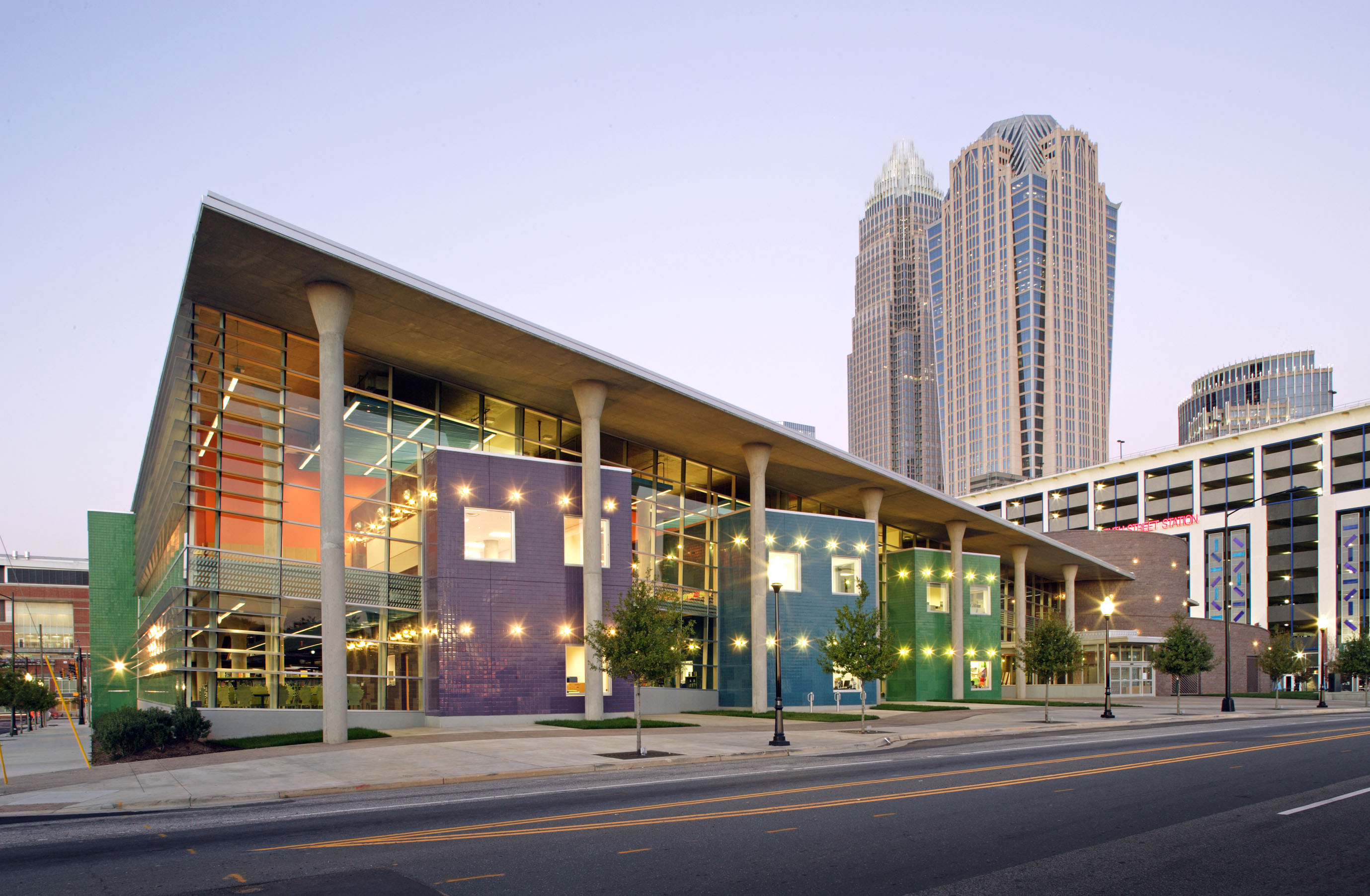
ImaginOn

Charlotte Center City is served by two branches of the Public Library of Charlotte and Mecklenburg County now known as Charlotte Mecklenburg Library. The Main library is located on North Tryon Street. In November 2019, new designs for the $100 million, 115,000-square-foot Main Library in Uptown Charlotte were revealed. The organization is planning to break ground in 2021 and complete the build in early 2024.

ImaginOn: The Joe and Joan Martin Center is located on east Seventh Street. ImaginOn is a collaborative venture of Charlotte Mecklenburg Library and the Children's Theater of Charlotte. The library provides services, books, CDs, DVDs and homework support for children and teens. ImaginOn contains the McColl Family Theatre and the Wachovia Playhouse, venues used by the Children's Theater for their performances.

== Parks, recreation, and culture ==
=== Parks ===
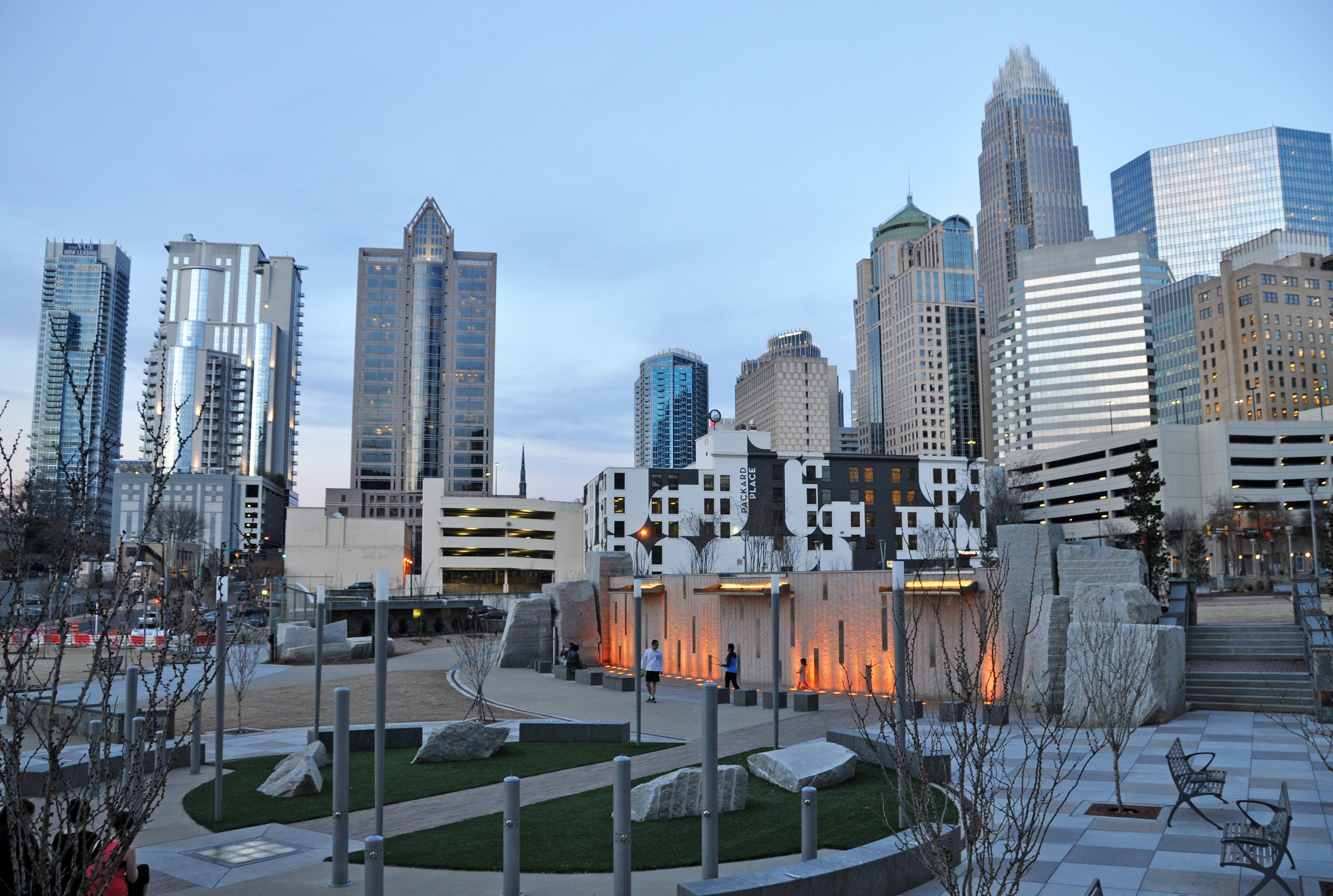
Roamare Bearden Park

- Romare Bearden Park
- First Ward Park
- Fourth Ward Park
- The Green
- Marshall Park

=== Entertainment venues ===
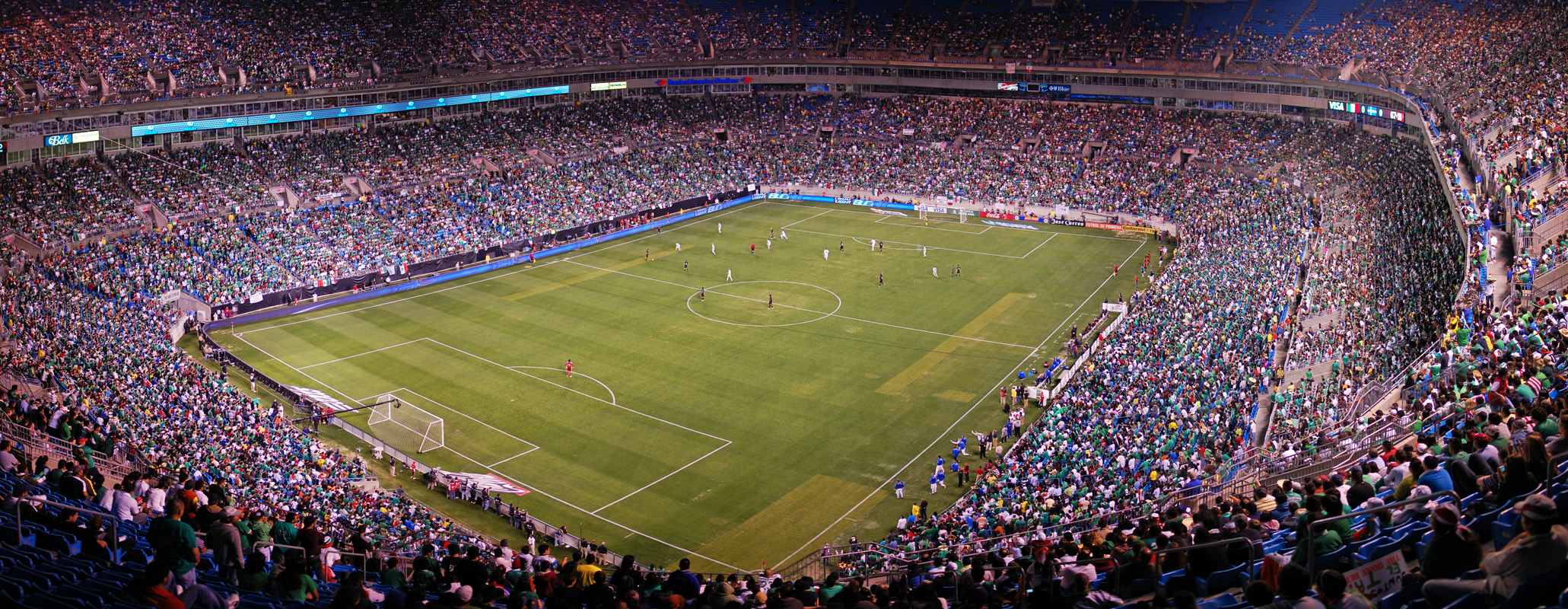
Bank of America Stadium

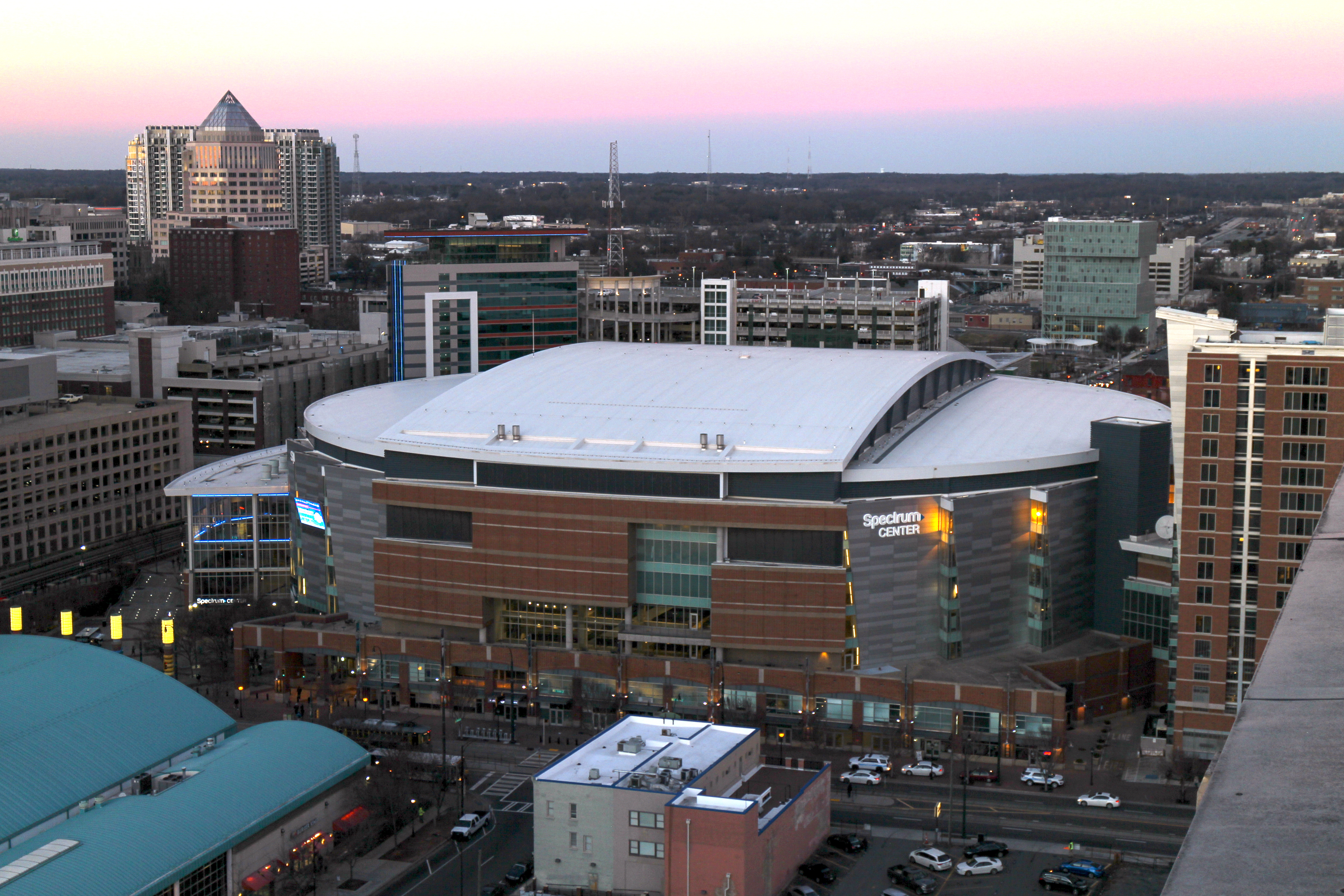
Spectrum Center

Uptown Charlotte has two major league sports venues. Bank of America Stadium, home of the Carolina Panthers and Charlotte FC, opened in 1996; and the Spectrum Center, home of the Charlotte Hornets, opened in 2005; The Charlotte Knights, a minor league baseball team, play at Truist Field.

The Charlotte Convention Center attracts over 500,000 people a year to its 280,000 square feet (26,000 m^{2}) of exhibit space. The Convention Center is currently undergoing an expansion to add an additional 50,000 square feet (4,600 m^{2}) of meeting space and a pedestrian bridge connection to the adjacent Westin hotel.

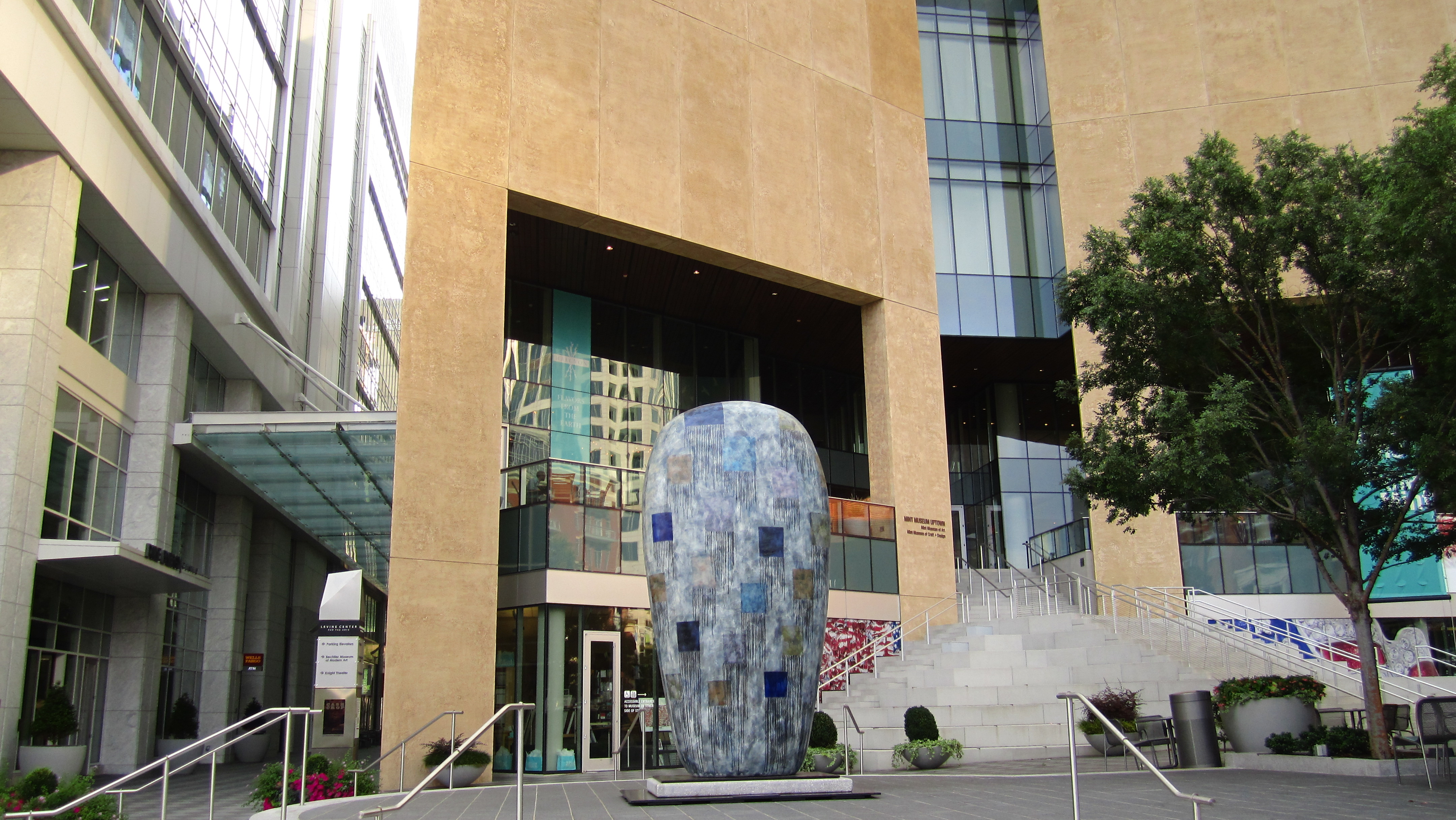
Mint Museum Uptown at Levine Center for the Arts

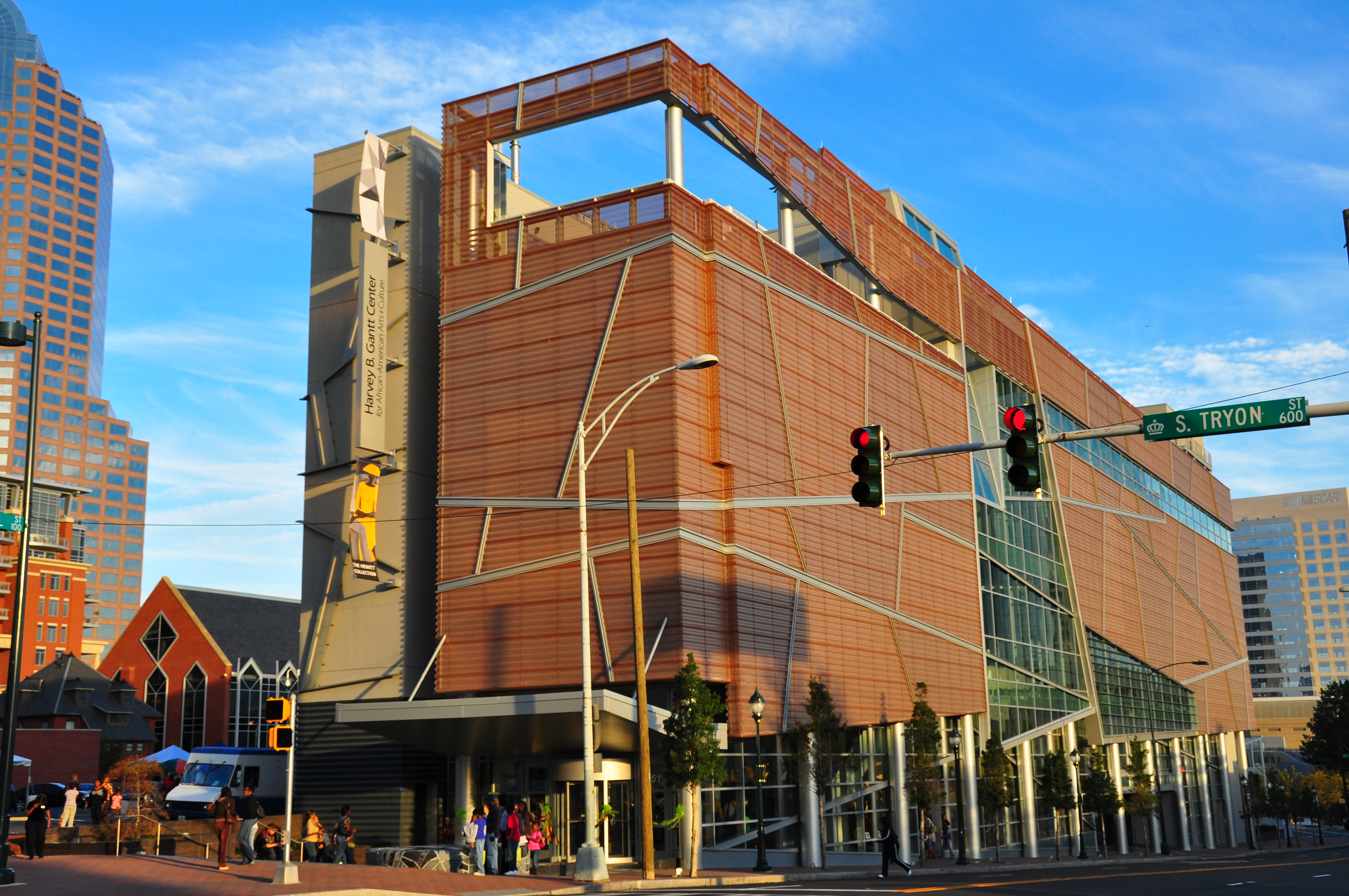
The Harvey B. Gantt Center for African American Arts + Culture

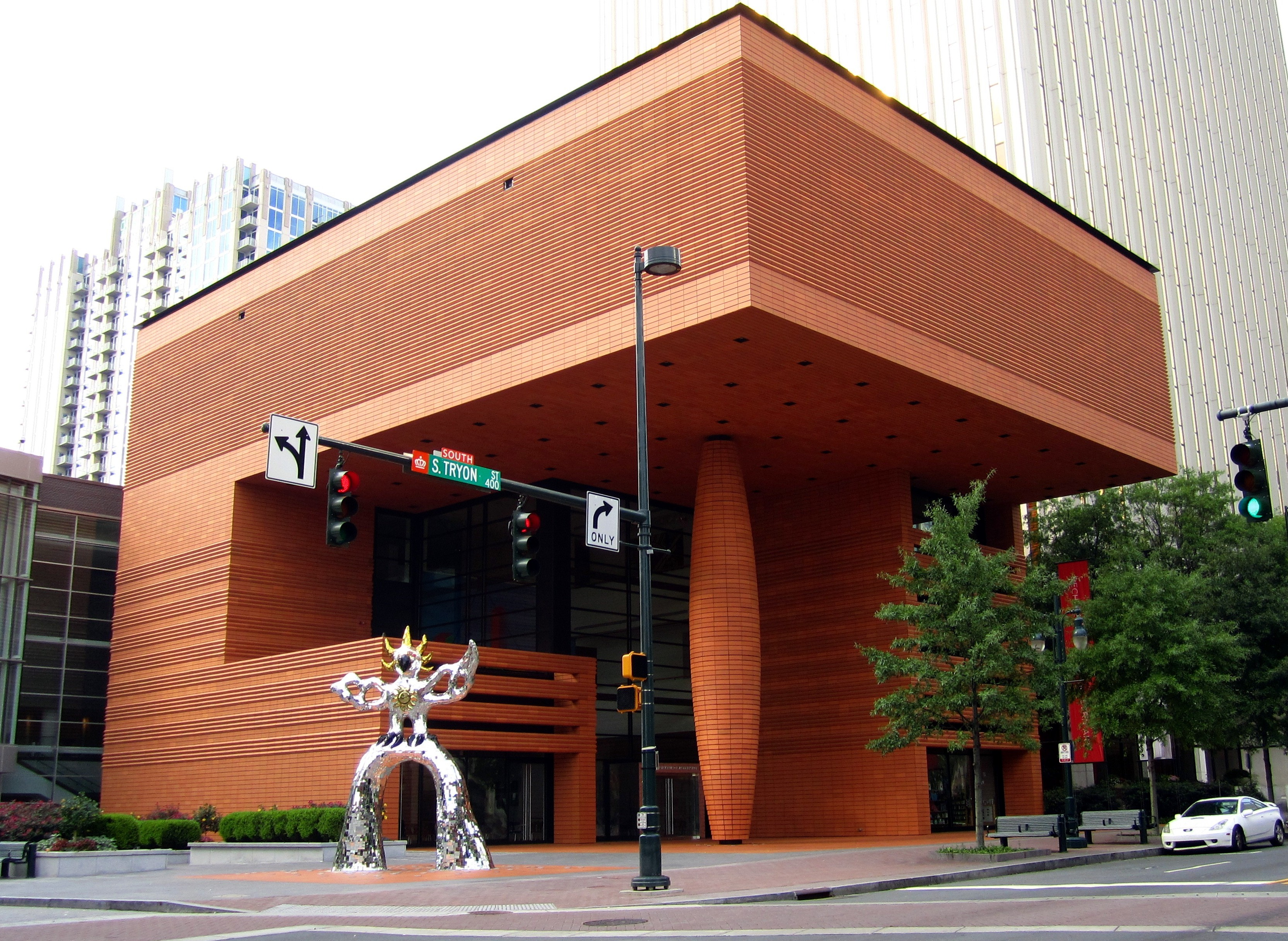
Bechtler Museum of Modern Art

Within recent years, multiple museums have opened in Uptown. The first phase of the Levine Center for the Arts opened in 2010, as part of the then-named Wachovia Cultural Campus. List of museums in Uptown:

- Bechtler Museum of Modern Art
- Charlotte-Mecklenburg Fire Education Center and Museum
- Discovery Place
- Harvey B. Gantt Center for African-American Arts + Culture
- The Light Factory
- McColl Center for Art + Innovation
- Mint Museum
- NASCAR Hall of Fame
- Museum of Illusions Charlotte
- Second Ward Alumni House Museum
- AvidxChange Music Factory

=== Performing arts ===
- Blumenthal Performing Arts Center
- Carolina Theatre
- Levine Center for the Arts
- Knight Theater

== Media ==
The Charlotte Observer has its headquarters in Uptown Charlotte.

== Transportation ==
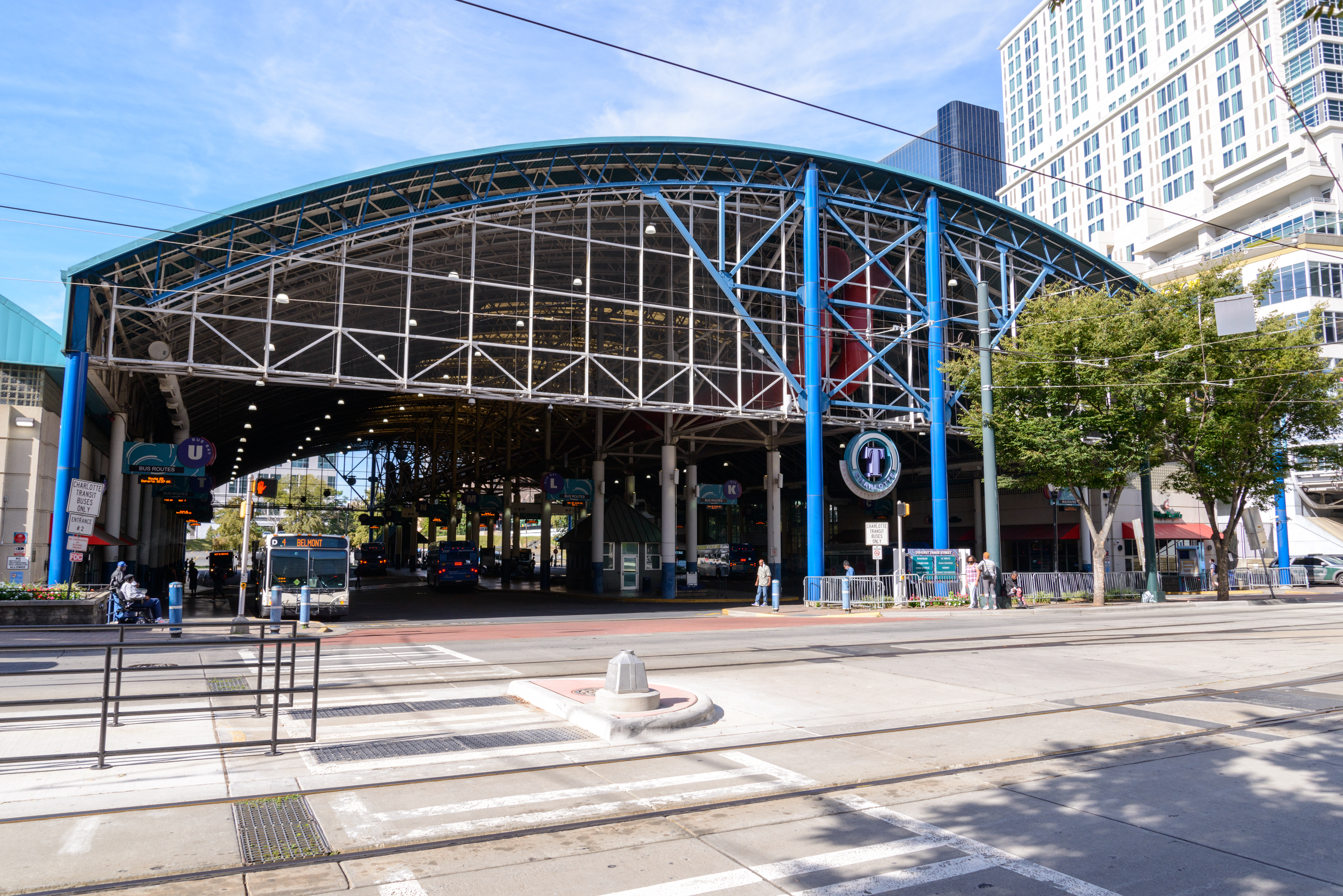
Charlotte Transportation Center

Uptown Charlotte is surrounded by Interstate 277, an auxiliary highway which creates the boundaries of the four wards and is the innermost of the city's three ring roads. Interstate 77 also runs parallel to the west of Uptown's third and fourth wards. The Lynx Blue Line runs through Uptown, connecting Uptown to Charlotte's University City to the northeast and Interstate 485 to the southwest via light rail.

The Gold Line Streetcar, which is free to ride, also runs through Uptown, connecting the Historic West End to the Elizabeth neighborhood with 17 stops along the way.

== See also ==
- List of tallest buildings in North Carolina / the United States / the world
- List of tallest buildings in Charlotte
- Charlotte, North Carolina
- List of Charlotte neighborhoods
