= Fourth Ward Park =

Fourth Ward Park may refer to:

- Historic Fourth Ward Park, a park in the Old Fourth Ward of Atlanta, Georgia
- Fourth Ward Park (Charlotte, North Carolina), an urban park in the Fourth Ward of Charlotte, North Carolina
