= Carolina Theatre (Charlotte) =

Historic theatre in North Carolina, US

Coordinates: 35°13′42″N 80°50′26.5″W

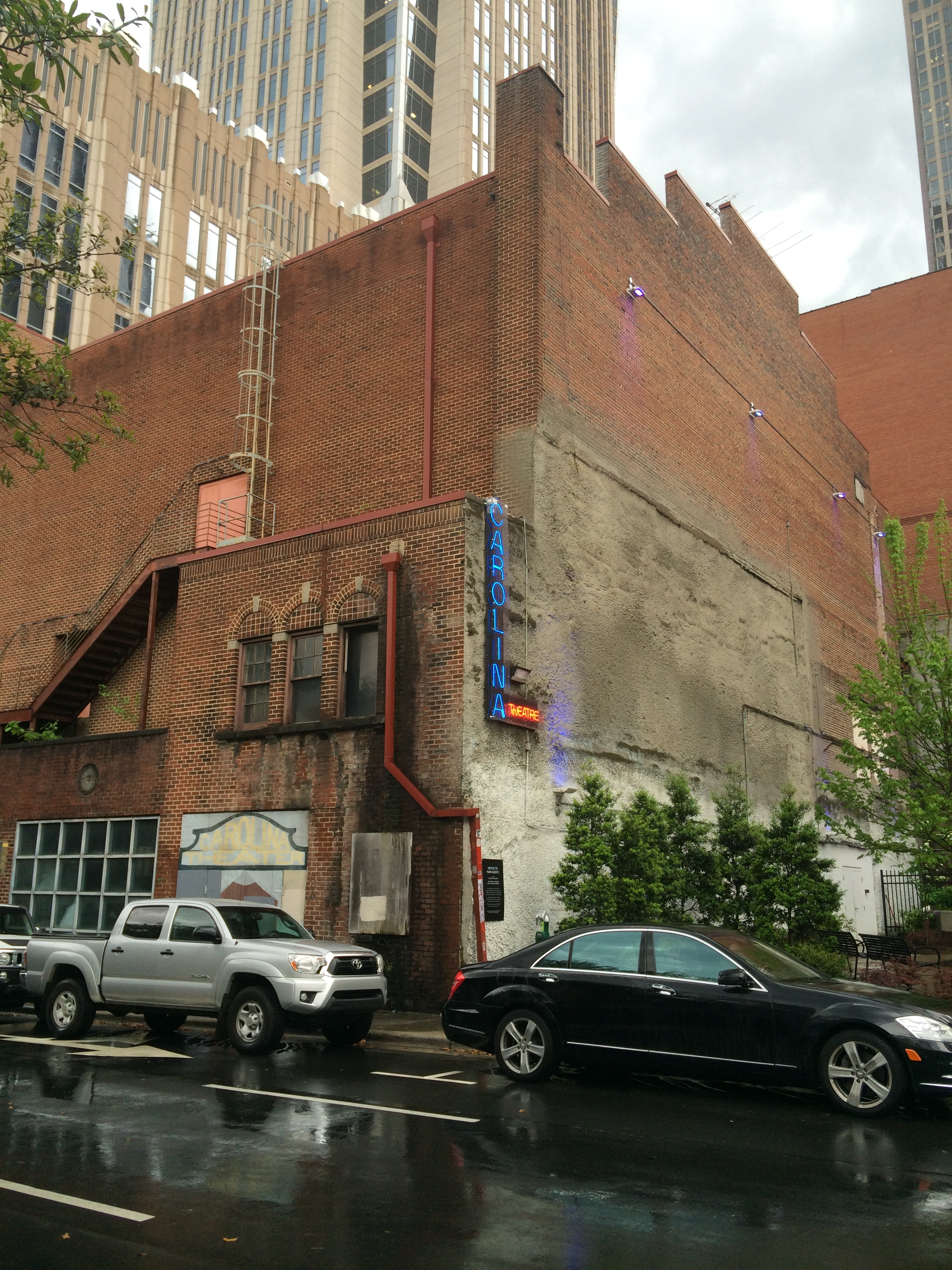
The Carolina Theatre in 2015

The Carolina Theatre originally opened in Charlotte, North Carolina, as a silent picture palace in 1927. After several decades of showing both live entertainment and films, the theatre closed in 1978. It sat vacant for nearly 50 years before reopening in March 2025.

== History ==
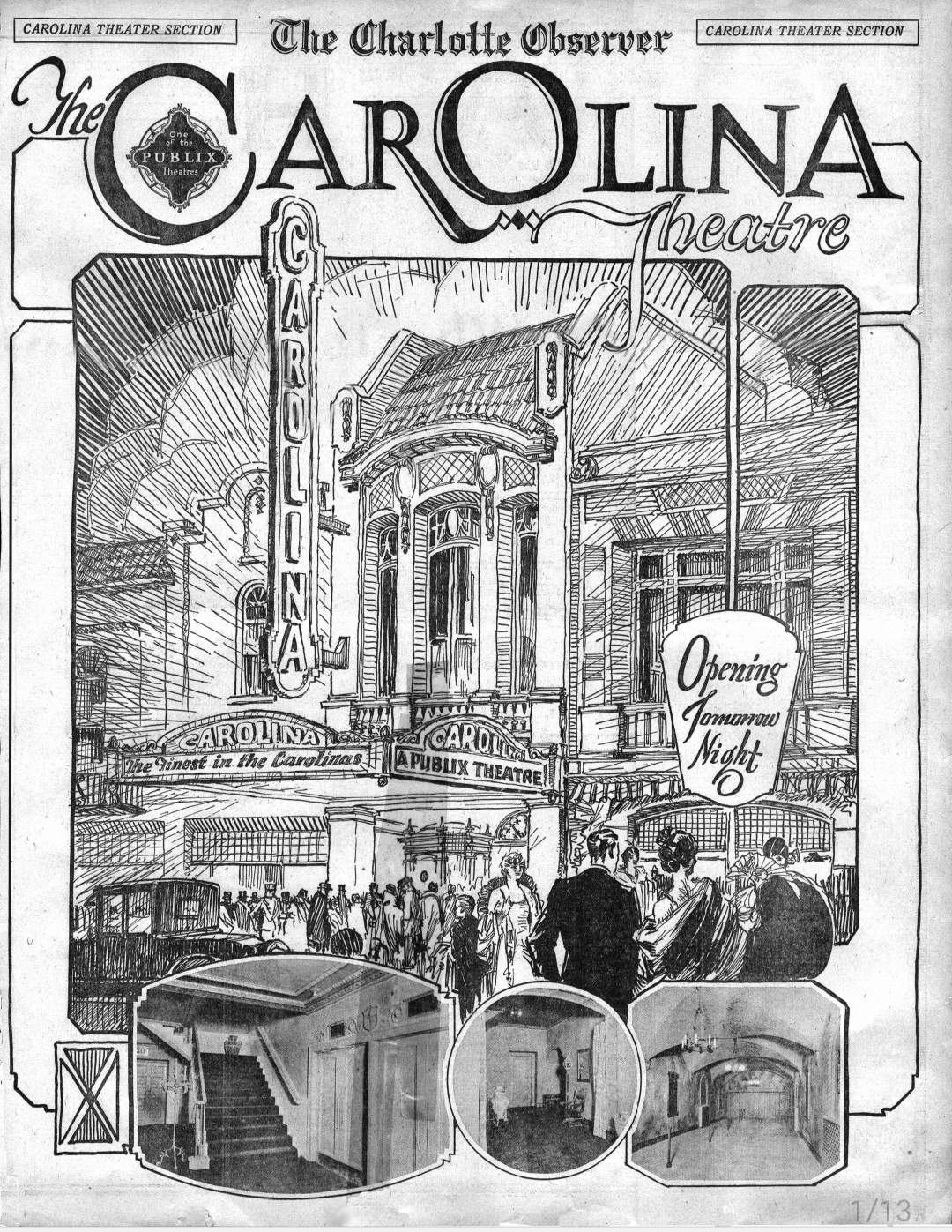
The Charlotte Observer announcing the opening of Carolina Theatres, 1927

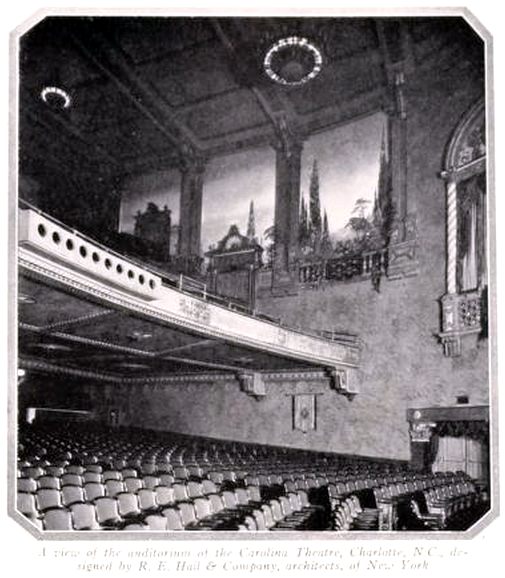
Interior of Carolina Theatre, 1927.

The Carolina Theatre opened in 1927, as part of Paramount Picture's Publix Theatre chain. The opening feature was the silent movie, A Kiss in a Taxi. Originally, movies ran for three days, and vaudeville performers were on stage Thursdays, Fridays and Saturdays. In 1938, the theatre was renovated to accommodate sound films, with the original murals replaced with acoustic tiles. On Feb. 10, 1956, the theatre played host to a performance by Elvis Presley. In 1953, the theatre installed a panoramic screen to accommodate CinemaScope films. In 1961, it was further renovated to accommodate Cinerama films. The Sound of Music would premiere at the Carolina Theatre on March 31, 1965, and run a record 79 weeks. The 398,201 people who saw the movie were more than the population of Charlotte, at the time. With rising competition from suburban multiplexes, the theatre closed on Nov. 27, 1978, with a showing of Bruce Lee’s Fists of Fury. Arson furthered damaged the theatre in the 1980s.

=== Renovation ===
After many unsuccessful attempts to renovate and revive the theatre, the City of Charlotte acquired the building in 1986 and sold it to Foundation For The Carolinas in April 2013. The renovation will restore historical touches, such as the murals and original marquee, to replicate the original 1927 atmosphere as much as possible. Most of the $51.5 million of the budget was raised from private sources. Construction on the restoration began in 2017. The theatre will be part of a larger Civic Campus called Belk Place. When completed, programming will focus on civic discussions, speakers, community gatherings, films, concerts and more.

After many delays, foundation executive vice president Laura Smith said that after many delays the theater would reopen in spring 2023. The ribbon cutting ceremony occurred on March 24, 2025. This followed $90 million invested and 12 years after the sale of the theatre to Foundation for the Carolinas in December 2012. The first performance was on March 28, 2025 featuring soprano Renée Fleming joins the Charlotte Symphony Orchestra for a performance billed as "A homecoming".

== InterContinental Hotel ==
In March 2017, it was announced that, as part of the theatre's restoration, a 257-room InterContinental hotel would be built atop the structure. The developer is Salter Brothers of Melbourne, Australia (formerly SB&G Hotel Group), while the operator will be Valor Hospitality Partners. The project is estimated to cost $100. The project broke ground and the tower crane was installed in October 2019. The first 6 stories would be used by the theater with the remaining 28 stories to be used as a hotel over 180,000 square feet (17,000 m^{2}) of space.

The hotel project was put on hold in November 2020, when the developers lost their financing, due to the economic impact of the COVID-19 pandemic. Hotel demand dropped by 40% due to the COVID-19 pandemic since the hotel relies heavily upon business travel. On August 25, 2022, Foundation For the Carolinas CEO Michael Marsicano said that after many delays, construction would resume soon. The hotel developer, Salter Brothers, announced in June 2023 the project is back on track. Construction will start in summer 2024 and complete in mid-2026.

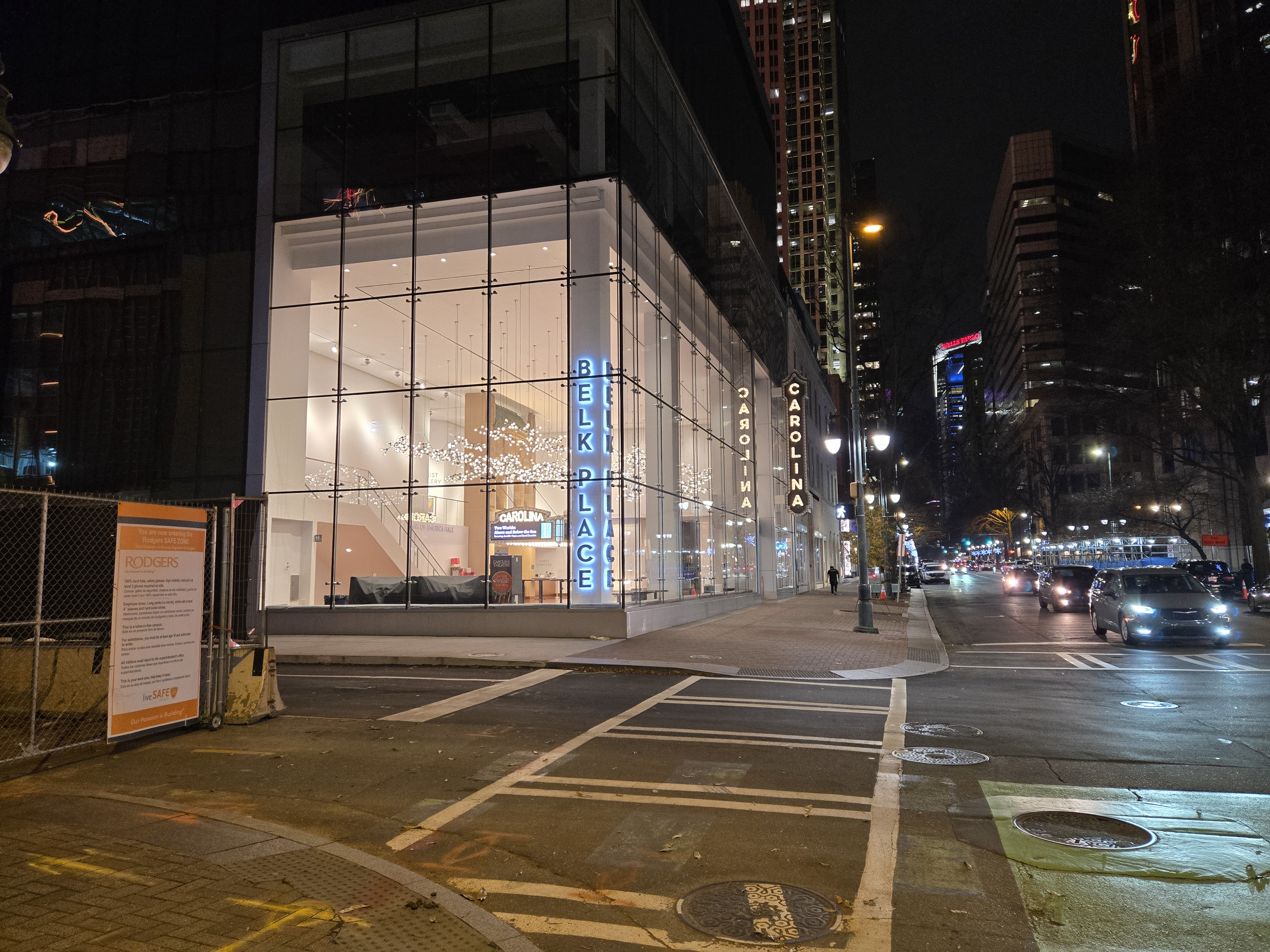
The lobby of the Carolina Theater which the hotel will be built on shown in December 2025

== See also ==
- List of tallest buildings in North Carolina / the United States / the world
- North Carolina Blumenthal Performing Arts Center
- List of tallest buildings in Charlotte
- Uptown Charlotte
