= Duke Energy Plaza =

Skyscraper in Charlotte, North Carolina, U.S.

Coordinates: 35°13′24″N 80°50′51″W

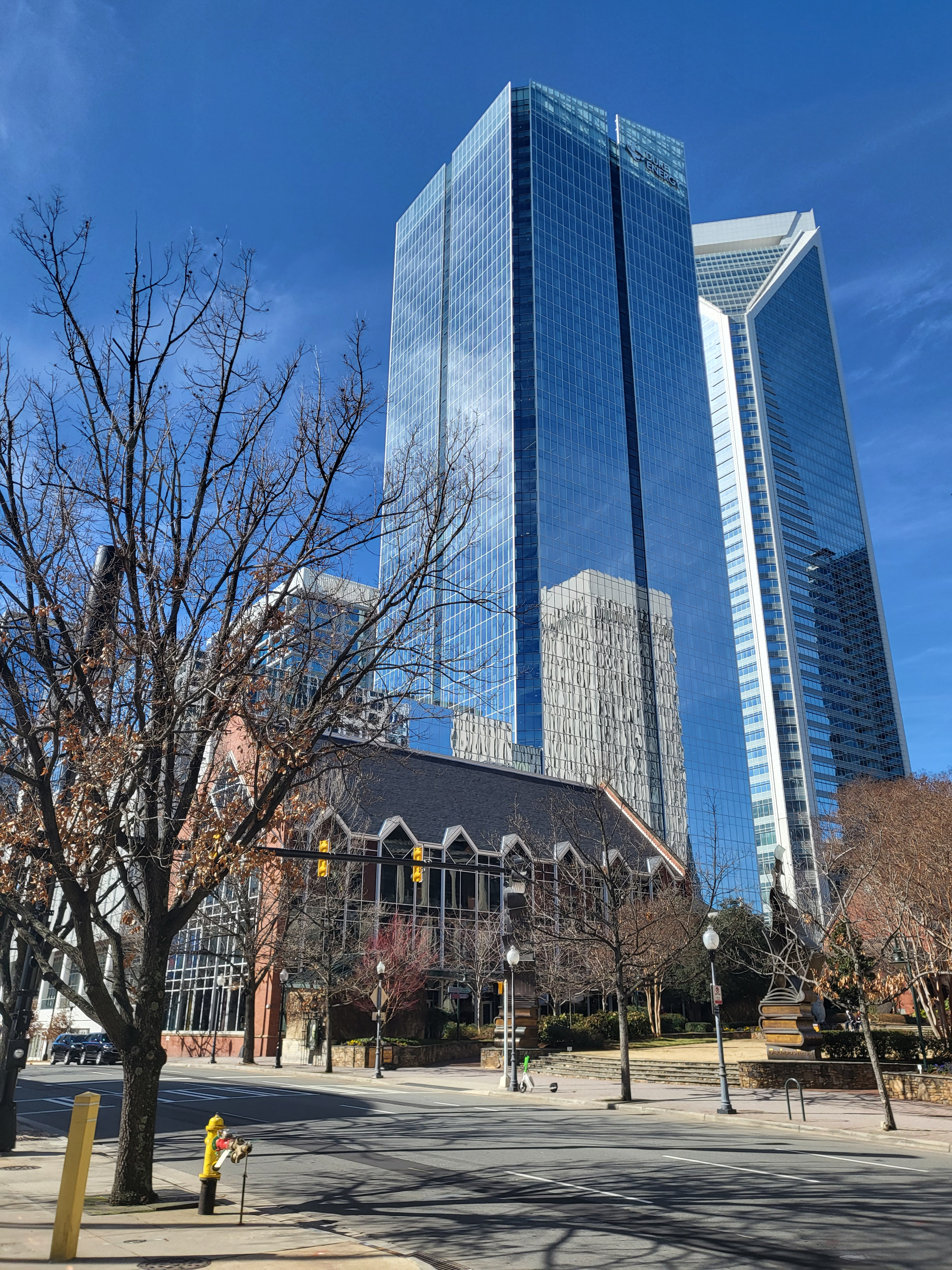
- Interactive map of the Duke Energy Plaza area

General information
- Status: Completed
- Location: 525 South Tryon Street, Charlotte, North Carolina, United States
- Construction started: 2019
- Estimated completion: 2023
- Cost: $675 million
- Owner: CGA Capital and Childress Klein
- Landlord: Childress Klein

Height
- Height: 629 feet (192 m)

Technical details
- Floor count: 40 floors
- Floor area: 1,000,000 square feet (93,000 m^{2})

Design and construction
- Architect: TVS Design

Other information
- Parking: 7 Floor 1,100 Space Parking Garage

The Duke Energy Plaza is a 629 feet (192 m), 40 floor skyscraper in Uptown Charlotte, North Carolina. It is the third largest building in Charlotte by leasable square feet and serve as the corporate headquarters of Duke Energy. It houses up to 4,400 Duke Energy employees and contractors. The entire building features 1,000,000 square feet (93,000 m^{2}) of space, including 25,000 square feet (2,300 m^{2}) of retail space, a 7-floor parking garage for 1,100 vehicles, and will be a LEED-Gold Certified Class AA office tower.

== Construction ==
The building combines tube structure design with traditional cast-place concrete. The tower is the second-tallest building in the world to use this design. It also utilized a form work system that climbed with the structure to create concretes forms. According to building contractor Batson-Cook "The schedule the team has established allows them to turn a 25,000-square-foot floor every week on the tower. Once a floor had been poured, the hydraulic lifting system rose the frame up to the next level and prepared for the next form. A system like this improved efficiency, reduced time spent lifting the frame from level to level, and improved the team’s safety performance."

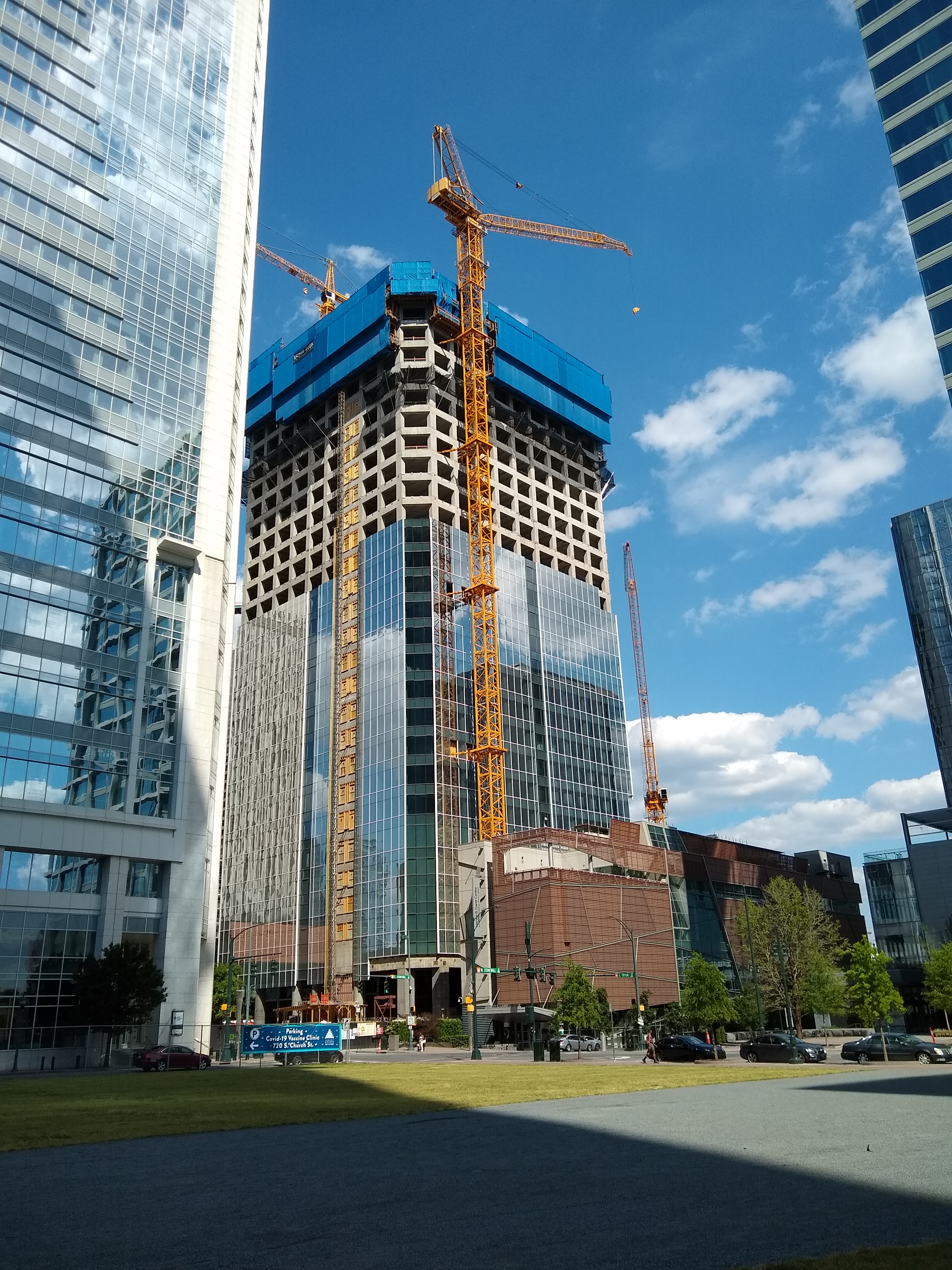
The building under construction in May 2021, the picture shows the form work system mentioned above.

Affiliates of CGA Capital and Childress Klein funded the construction and development cost, and once completed will buy the building for an estimated $675 million, a record high building sale for Charlotte. The sale price could vary since final construction costs have not yet been determined. Childress Klein is the developer of the project. Duke will lease back the entire building.

On August 20, 2021, the building was topped off when the last patch of concrete floor was added. Exterior work was completed by the end of 2022 with interior work scheduled for completion in 2023.

== History ==
The site is located directly across from 550 South Tryon which once housed Duke Energy's corporate headquarters. The lobby is on South Tryon Street. The site is a 2.1-acre former parking lot that was purchased in 2017 for $27.5 million. The land purchase was six transactions from two separate companies. 1.8 acres was divided into 5 transactions purchased from Consolidated Realty Co. for $22.9 million. The final .3 acre lot was purchased from Eastern Federal Corp. for $4.6 million.

Duke has 7,700 employees in the Charlotte area working in numerous offices. The company is reducing its real estate footprint by moving out of a number of buildings such as 401 S. College Street, 526 S. Church Street, 4320 Yancey Road and 400 South Tryon. Many of the employees from the buildings that are closing will be relocating to the tower. Also, the COVID-19 pandemic has changed the company's views about having employees work from the office full time. It is expected many employees will work from home part time. Even after completion of the tower, Duke will continue to occupy Optimist Hall, NASCAR Plaza, and Piedmont Town Center (until 2025). Duke's goal with its real estate consolidation is trimming its foot print from 2,500,000 square feet (230,000 m^{2}) to 1,000,000 square feet (93,000 m^{2}) by 2050. Duke estimates they will save $85 to $90 million over the next five years.

Prior to the Duke Energy Plaza, Duke's most visible presence was the Duke Energy Center. As of May 2021 Duke occupied 491,000 square feet (45,600 m^{2}) spanning 21 floors. On May 17, 2021, Duke announced it planned vacate the building entirely. Wells Fargo, the building owner, plans to fill the space with some of its own employees as they are planning to stop leasing the One Wells Fargo Center.

As of December 31, 2021 Duke had exited its lease of the Duke Energy Center with all remaining Duke employees having vacated the building prior to the holidays. All Duke Energy signs and plaques have been removed from the building and it has been temporarily renamed 550 South Tryon. When the Duke Energy Plaza is completed, Duke Energy will relocate their employees into the building as its new headquarters.

On September 21, 2022, Duke Energy finished installing its name and logo on the northeast and southwest sides of the new building. The exterior of the building was mostly finished at that time with small landscaping projects remaining and the company was conducting testing of exterior lighting schemes. However, at that time only about 40% of the interior work was finished and none of the 40 floors were complete. Full occupancy is not expected until the third quarter of 2023.

In April 2023 Duke announced five tenants will occupy 9,000 square feet (840 m^{2}) of the available 25,000 square feet (2,300 m^{2}) of retail space in the building. The list includes Albertine, a fine restaurant by the Kindreds occupying 4,360 square feet (405 m^{2}); Milkbread, a fast casual restaurant serving doughnuts, crispy chicken sandwiches, biscuits, salads, and more which will occupy 722 square feet (67.1 m^{2}); Que Fresa Taqueria + Bar, a fast casual Mexican restaurant that will occupy 2,000 square feet (190 m^{2}); Somi Sushi, a fast-casual Japanese restaurant that will occupy 1,000 square feet (93 m^{2}); AJ’s Dry Cleaners will offer a pickup and drop-off kiosk on South College Street. The new retail tenants are expected to open for business in 2024.

== See also ==
- List of tallest buildings in North Carolina / the United States / the world
- List of tallest buildings in Charlotte
- Uptown Charlotte
