= Fourth Ward Park (Charlotte, North Carolina) =

Park in North Carolina, US

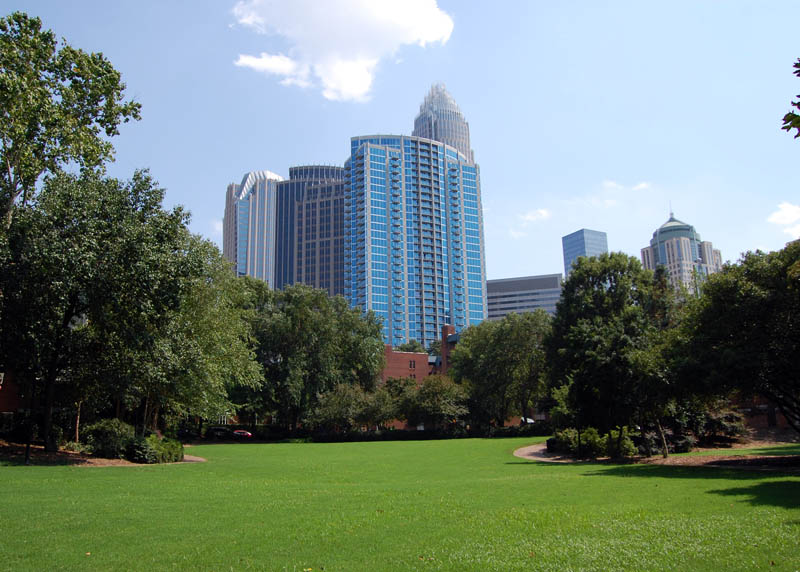
- Interactive map of Fourth Ward Park
- Type: Public park
- Location: Charlotte, North Carolina
- Coordinates: 35.2310°N 80.8428°W
- Area: 3 acres (1.2 ha)
- Operator: Mecklenburg County Parks and Recreation
- Website: Fourth Ward Park

Fourth Ward Park is a three-acre (1.2 hectare) urban park at 301 North Poplar Street in the Fourth Ward of Charlotte, North Carolina. It features walking trails, decorative water fountains, and a children's playground including slides and swings. One of the highlights of the park is its dog-friendly policy.
