= 129 West Trade =

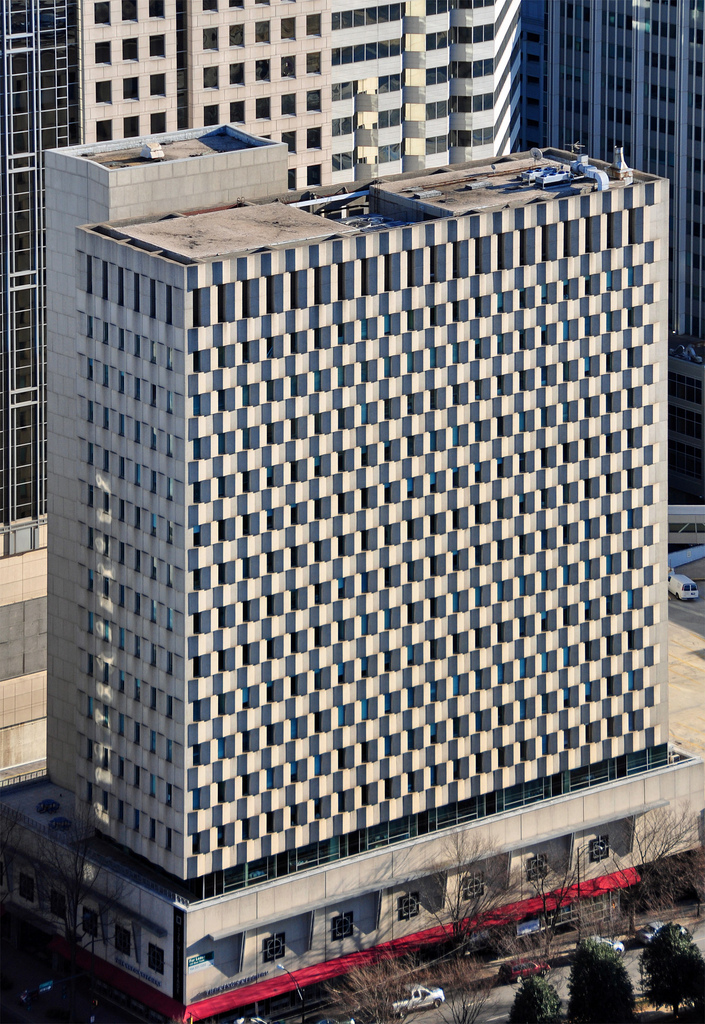
- Interactive map of the 129 West Trade area

General information
- Status: Completed
- Type: Office
- Architectural style: Internationalism
- Location: Charlotte, North Carolina, United States
- Coordinates: 35.2278°N 80.8443°W
- Construction started: 1956
- Opening: 1958

Height
- Antenna spire: 250 feet (76 m)

Technical details
- Floor count: 15
- Floor area: 164,171 sq ft (15,252.0 m^{2})

Design and construction
- Architects: Harrison & Abramovitz; A. G. Odell Jr. & Associates

Other information
- Public transit: Tryon Street

129 West Trade is a 250 feet (76 m) high-rise in Charlotte, North Carolina. It was built in 1958 and has 15 floors. The building is clad with 3,822 - 2,000 pound (890 kg) precast concrete facade panels which measure 5.5 by 6 feet (1.6 by 1.8 m).

This building was home to the Wachovia Charlotte office prior to 1975, when the bank moved to 400 South Tryon. The Charlotte Chamber of Commerce occupied the building from 1975 to 1995.

== See also ==
- List of tallest buildings in Charlotte
