= Deccan Park =

Deccan Park may refer to:

- Deccan Park (park) - A park near Quli Qutb Shahi Tombs, Hyderabad, India
- Deccan Park (building) - A TCS company building, Hyderabad, India
