= Harvey B. Gantt Center =

African-American art museum in North Carolina

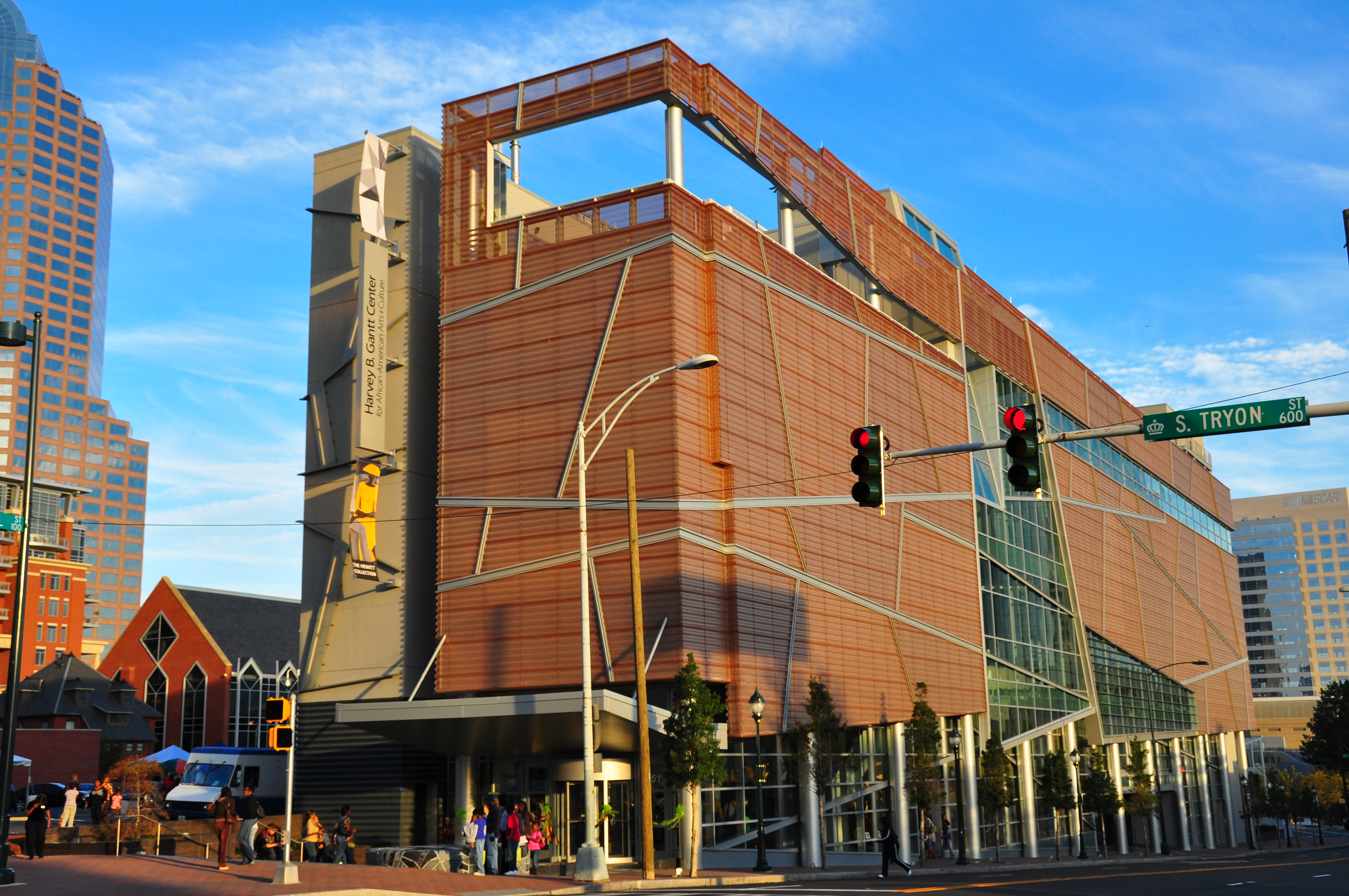
- Harvey B. Gantt Center, Opening Day
- Established: October 24, 2009
- Location: Charlotte, North Carolina
- Coordinates: 35.22331°N 80.84813°W
- Collections: African-American art
- Founders: Mary T. Harper, PhD and Bertha Maxwell Roddey, Ph.D.
- President: Bonita Buford (2024-)
- Chairperson: Jonté Harrell (2026-)
- Public transit access: Brooklyn Village
- Website: ganttcenter.org

The Harvey B. Gantt Center for African-American Arts + Culture, formerly known as the Afro-American Cultural Center, is in Charlotte, North Carolina and named for Harvey Gantt, the city's first African-American mayor and the first African-American student at Clemson University. The 46,500 sq ft, four-story center was designed by Freelon Group Architects at a cost of $18.6 million — and was dedicated in October 2009 as part of what is now the Levine Center for the Arts.

== History ==
In 1974, Mary T. Harper, Ph.D. (1935-2020), an assistant professor of English at the UNC-Charlotte, proposed an Afro-American cultural center for the city of Charlotte. Working with her mentor, Bertha Maxwell-Roddey, Ph.D., director of UNC-Charlotte's Black Studies Center, Harper envisioned a Charlotte-Mecklenburg Afro-American Cultural and Service Center. Harper and Roddey realized that people did not know a lot about the accomplishments of African-Americans, and particularly African-Americans from North Carolina. The center they planned would let African-Americans celebrate who they were and what their people had done. Harper and Maxwell-Roddey started with a festival in Marshall Park, the former site of the Brooklyn neighborhood. After a second festival in 1975, the women helped to start the Afro-American Cultural and Service Center.

For ten years starting in 1976, the Afro-American Cultural Center used 605 square feet in the former First Baptist Church known as Spirit Square. Other locations were considered including the McColl Center for Visual Art.

The permanent location eventually chosen was Little Rock A.M.E. Zion Church. The church was planning a new sanctuary across the street from their existing location on Myers Street, and people worried the old building might be demolished. The brick Neoclassical Revival building that was Little Rock's third location was designed by James Mackson McMichael and was completed in June 1911 at a cost of $20,000. Little Rock sold their old building to the city in 1979 and moved to their new home in 1981. The building was declared a historical landmark in 1982. 7th Street was to be widened, which put the historic building in jeopardy. Instead, the former church was renovated using $1.1 million in donations and a $540,000 grant from the city, with Dalton Morgan Shook & Partners as the architects. On March 15, 1986, the Afro-American Cultural Center officially opened its new 11,000-square-foot home at Myers and 7th Streets. The two-story building had three levels, with a 180-seat theater and a 300-seat amphitheater. Its classes included music, dance, theater and visual arts. The theater space went by the name "Little Theater In The Attic"circa the late 1980's through the 1990's. In the mid 1990's the rear of the theater was modified to enclose the work area, to help reduce issues of noise from operating during a show, of the Stage Manager, Lightboard Operator, Soundboard Operator and depending on the show Spotlight & operator and Video Projectionist. The theater's technical equipment consisted of a computerized Strand Century Mantrix 2 Lighting Control Console Board with 2 scene preset of 48 channels. With CD-80 dimmer packs mounted back stage with a Hard cable patch, Stage Lighting Instruments were an assortment of Strand Lekolite and Fresnels. The Sound Equipment was 12 channel Yamaha Mixer Graphic equalizer with Peavey Amplifier in stereo for the FOH Speakers with mix of Shure microphones and stands. The stage floor was a non painted hardwood finish.

Voters rejected a $95 million plan for cultural facilities and a new arena in 2001. At the time, the plan was to expand the Afro-American Cultural Center with $10 million that would have come from the arts package. In addition to expansion, several new sites were considered.

On November 2, 2005, a plan was announced for a new $17.9 million Afro-American Cultural Center as part of the Wachovia Cultural Campus on Tryon Street. To attract visitors would require a major attraction. Bank of America had announced it would donate the Hewitt Collection in 1998, but the existing building was not large enough.

On December 7, 2007, the Afro-American Cultural Center, which had said earlier in the year that their new facility would be named for Harvey Gantt, revealed the formal name The Harvey B. Gantt Center for African-American Arts and Culture. This was later changed to Harvey B. Gantt Center for African-American Arts + Culture.

Freelon, later named as lead architect for the National Museum of African American History and Culture, designed the new building. Although the site was very narrow, Freelon saw designing a building in that space as a challenge.

After the decision was made to move the Afro-American Cultural Center to the new Harvey Gantt Center, those interested in historic preservation wanted to make sure the former church remained standing. In 2008, Little Rock Church had already asked to lease their former home. Little Rock paid $590,000 in April 2009 to buy back the old building, which was rededicated on December 13, 2009, as the Little Rock Community Development Center.

The Gantt Center was the first part of the Wells Fargo (formerly Wachovia) Cultural Campus to be completed. It had four times the space of the Little Rock site.

The dedication ceremonies for the $18.6 million Gantt Center at Tryon and Stonewall Streets were held on October 24, 2009. Mayor Pat McCrory, who was about to leave office, told Gantt, "Former mayor to former mayor, you have been a great role model. You are the best of Charlotte, and I am so glad to see your name on this building." Gantt said, "This beautiful, awesome building is far beyond my wildest dreams. I feel good about what this magnificent building represents – how far we have come."

The Harvey B. Gantt Center was featured in Google Cultural Institute's February 2016 online gallery celebrating black history, art, and culture. The center was part of 50 cultural institutions, 80 curated exhibits, and over 500 videos, images, and articles in the gallery.

== Building ==
Located at South Tryon and East Brooklyn Village Avenue, the four-story 46,490-square foot building is a "modernist structure wrapped in glass and metal", is 360' by 40' and located above tunnels connecting College Street and East Brooklyn Village Avenue to a parking garage for Duke Energy Center. To allow access by car and truck ramps on the narrow site (400' x 60'), the lobby is on the second floor and is reached by stairs and escalators which frame a central glass atrium and are based on Jacob's Ladder in the Book of Genesis.

The design was inspired by Myers Street School that was in the Brooklyn neighborhood, an African-American section of the city which was demolished as part of an urban renewal program in the 1960s. The school was Charlotte's only public school for African-Americans from 1886 to 1907. The Jacob's Ladder concept also appears outside the building. Another feature of the building is a rain screen, with perforated metal panels in some areas and windows in others, resembling a quilt with fluorescent lights that resemble stitches. Freelon Group won the 2009 Thomas Jefferson Award for Public Architecture from the American Institute of Architects for projects that included the Gantt Center.

On the east wing wall is Divergent Threads, Lucent Memories, a work by David Wilson of Apex inspired by quilts which recalls the history of Brooklyn.

On the plaza connecting the center to other area buildings, Intersections by Juan Logan uses Kuba patterns from Democratic Republic of Congo, with chevron and diamond patterns representing connections between different cultures.

== The John and Vivian Hewitt Collection of African-American Art ==
Vivian Hewitt was the first African-American librarian hired by Carnegie Library of Pittsburgh, and she taught and served as a librarian at Atlanta University. Her husband John taught English at Morehouse College. John and Vivian Hewitt, though not rich, put together one of the most significant collections of African-American art during their 50 years of marriage, starting in 1949. The art works were gifts made to each other over the years. The works were affordable for them at the time they bought them because white people had not started buying them, but as the importance of African-American artists became clear, that started to change. The Hewitt Collection was purchased by NationsBank (later Bank of America) in 1998, with the plan being to locate the works in an expanded Afro-American Cultural Center. The collection toured the country, and the 58 works now make up the majority of the Gantt Center's permanent collection. The 20th century African-American artists include Henry Ossawa Tanner, Ann Tanksley, John Biggers, Elizabeth Catlett and Romare Bearden.

Shortly before the Gantt Center opened in October 2009, 26 works by 20 artists went to the center. Other works from the collection were scheduled to appear in the gallery devoted to the collection over a two-year period.

== See also ==
- List of museums focused on African Americans
