= Levine Center for the Arts =

Coordinates: 35.223966°N 80.848295°W

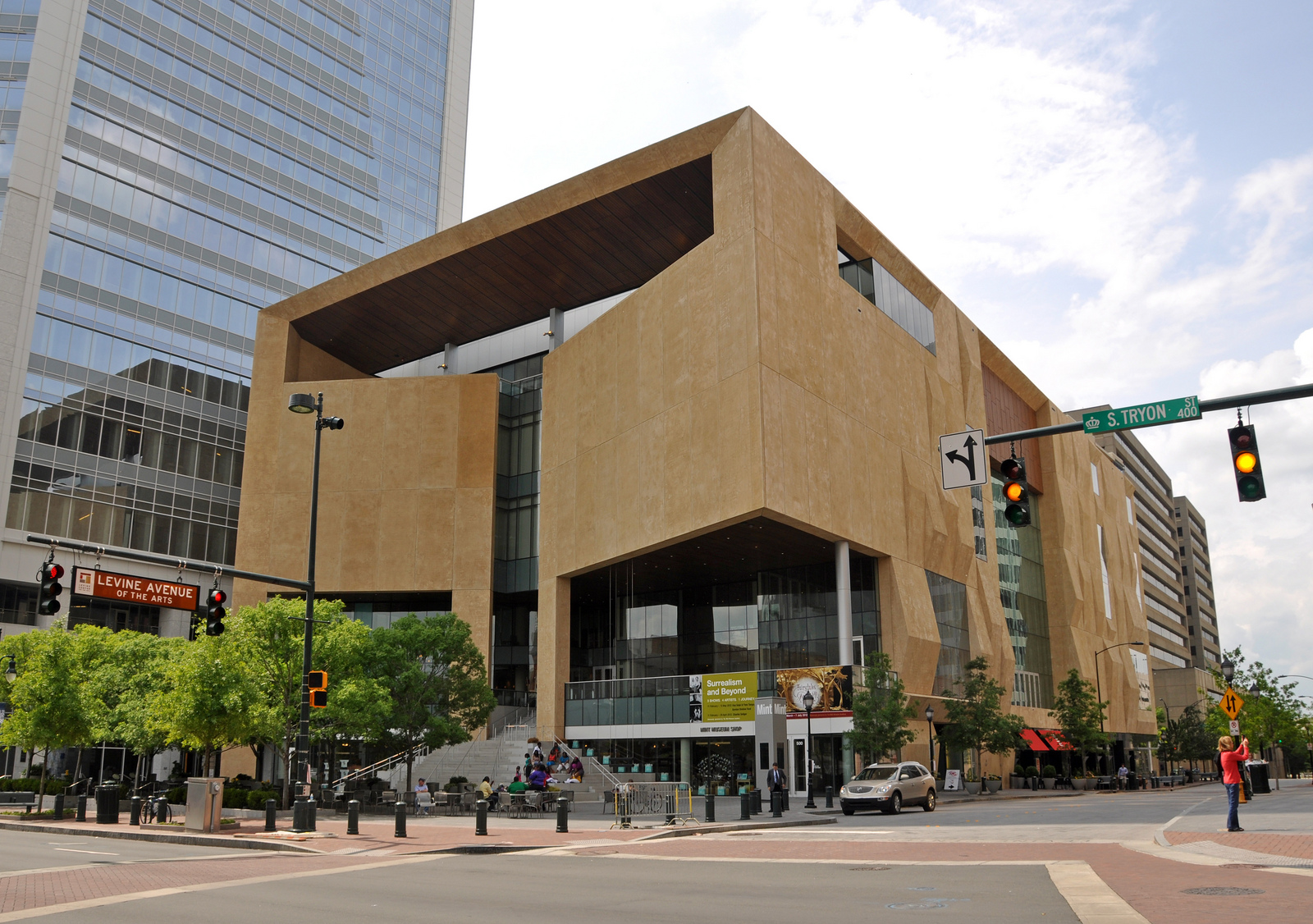
Mint Museum in uptown Charlotte

Levine Center for the Arts on South Tryon Street in Charlotte, North Carolina, includes Bechtler Museum of Modern Art, the Harvey B. Gantt Center for African-American Arts + Culture, the Knight Theater, and the Mint Museum Uptown. It was named for Leon Levine, whose foundation provided financing.

== History ==
After a year of study by the Arts & Science Council, the 25-year Cultural Facilities Master Plan became a reality in November 2003. The plan was the next stage following a 1976 plan that led to such projects as Spirit Square, Discovery Place, and North Carolina Blumenthal Performing Arts Center. The $236 million first phase, including an $84 million endowment, included moving the Mint Museum uptown, a new contemporary art museum named for Andreas Bechtler, a new Afro-American Cultural Center, and a 1200-seat theater. These projects were included in a 2001 bond referendum that voters rejected.

The Cultural Facilities Master Plan led to the Campaign for Cultural Facilities in 2006. In addition to an endowment planned by the Arts & Science Council, and $35 million from Bank of America, Duke Energy and Wachovia Corp., the $150.5 million plan was to be financed by property taxes on a development by Wachovia, as well as a 4 percent tax on car rentals which would have to be approved by the North Carolina General Assembly, and specifically by all legislators from Mecklenburg County. Wachovia was building an office tower and parking garage, though if financing was approved, the bank would also build four of the five attractions. Discovery Place, which was planning renovations, was the fifth. The Charlotte city council was to approve an agreement with Wachovia on February 27. On December 1, the car-rental tax increased from 11 to 16 percent, with $1.35 million per year expected.

Groundbreaking took place September 27, 2007, on the $158 million First Street Cultural Campus, also referred to as the Wachovia Cultural Campus.

The tallest building of the complex was to be the Duke Energy Center. Also part of the complex would be the Harvey B. Gantt Center for African-American Arts + Culture, the Bechtler Art Museum, and the Wachovia Condominium Tower.

The Bechtler Museum of Modern Art would hold 1200 works of art assembled by Andreas Bechtler and his family during the previous 75 years, in a 35,000-square-foot (3,300 m^{2}) building designed by Mario Botta.

The Wachovia Condominium Tower would have had 42 floors and 410,000 square feet (38,000 m^{2}) of space, designed by Rule Joy Trammell + Rubio. Due to the Great Recession and the 2008 financial crisis, the only part of the tower built was the Knight Theater, until the Museum Tower opened in 2017.

The Harvey B. Gantt Center for African-American Arts + Culture would have four floors, cost $18.6 million and have 45,000 square feet (4,200 m^{2}) of gallery, classroom, and administrative space. It was dedicated October 24, 2009.

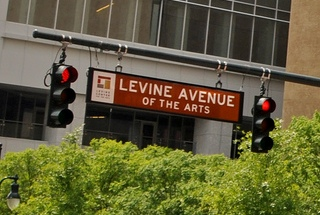
Levine Avenue sign

After Wells Fargo announced its takeover of Wachovia, the city said its contract with Wachovia required "successors" to finish the project, after which the city and county would buy the attractions. The campus was later renamed for Wells Fargo. After large contributions from Duke Energy and the Leon Levine Foundation resulted in the $83 million goal being reached, the Wells Fargo Cultural Campus became Levine Center for the Arts. On October 1, 2010, the $56 million 145,000-square-foot Mint Museum Uptown opened, completing the $127 million campus. Charlotte's city council changed the name of First Street to Levine Avenue of the Arts, with new signs revealed November 16.
