= Museum Tower =

Museum Tower may refer to:

- Museum Tower (Dallas), Texas
- Museum Tower (Miami), Florida
- Museum Tower (Charlotte), North Carolina
- Pinnacle Marina Tower, formerly the Pinnacle Museum Tower in San Diego, California
- St. Regis Museum Tower in San Francisco, California
