= Aurora Reading Club of Pittsburgh =

Arts and cultural organization

The Aurora Reading Club of Pittsburgh was established in 1894 by six local women, and is one of America's oldest African American arts and cultural organizations. Its initial purpose was to pursue “a systematic course of study in a manner to be decided by a majority of the membership and shall be for the mutual improvement of the membership in literature, art, science and matters relating to the vital interests of the day.” This purpose is reflected in the club's motto “Lifting As We Climb.”

== Development ==
The club was founded in 1894 by Rachel Lovett Jones along with Frances Golden, Anna Posey, Virginia Woodson Proctor, Hannah Grinage Lovett and Cora Virginia Hill Washington.

The Aurora Reading Club is one of the nation's oldest African American arts and cultural organizations; it has operated continually for 130 years.

In the early years, members traveled to each other's homes by horse and buggy to meet, sometimes staying overnight because of the duration of the journeys. The ladies presented papers they had written on various subjects. Frequently, guest speakers were invited to make presentations. Members adopted causes and supported them raising funds and donating goods. They spread goodwill by visiting the infirmed and knitting sweaters for enlisted soldiers.

Much of the history of The Aurora Reading Club has been passed along orally from generation to generation. In celebration of various anniversaries, the History Committee has worked diligently to document and preserve information about its members. A few were born before slavery ended; some were entrepreneurs; some were college graduates; many were very involved in the community including serving as volunteers on Urban League Boards and Committees, the NAACP, the YWCA, churches of several denominations, the civil rights movement and for the Lemington Home for the Aged which was a skilled facility for “infirmed colored people.” Members made social calls and entertained the residents.

Its 25 members uphold many of the traditions begun by the Club's founders. Members continue to hold formal meetings seven times a year to discuss books and/or hear from guest speakers. Throughout the year members attend lectures, performances, concerts, visual arts events, and fundraisers as well.

Aurora members engage in socially conscious initiatives by giving of their time, talent, and treasure to local, national, and international causes. In recent years, projects have included purchasing and donating goods to local shelters for women and children, tutoring children for Reading Is Fundamental, supporting missionary projects in Africa and making monetary donations to local and national organizations including the Smithsonian's National Museum for African American History and Culture, the August Wilson African American Cultural Center, libraries and universities.

Over the years, The Aurora Reading Club of Pittsburgh has enjoyed mutually beneficial partnerships with Pittsburgh Arts & Lectures, United Black Book Clubs of Pittsburgh, the August Wilson African American Cultural Center, the Pittsburgh Cultural Trust, Saturday Light Brigade Radio Show, the Senator John Heinz History Center, the Friday Club of Greensburg and Carnegie Libraries of Pittsburgh by participating in events, building audiences, supporting fundraisers and serving as volunteers. Individually and collectively, members are actively engaged in the community as civic leaders, board members and volunteers. Professionally, members have and continue to hold leadership positions within their organizations, and many have broken racial and/or gender barriers.

In 1971, the Club established a Book Fund to which members and supporters make donations. These funds are used to support organizations that encourage reading by purchasing books. In 1996, the fund was renamed The Edith Holland Memorial Book Fund in honor of one of its most ardent champions.

In 2002, the Senator John Heinz History Center became the official home to The Aurora Reading Club archives which includes meeting minutes, yearbooks, anniversary programs, newspaper clippings, artifacts and projects that have been created by members to celebrate milestone anniversaries. The Club archives are available to the public upon request. Since then, these legacy projects have been added to the collection:

- A quilt made in 2004 that reflect the lives of the members at that time that was created under the guidance of fiber artist Tina Brewer
- A scrap book, profiling the current members that was created in 2009
- “Reflections of an Aurora Woman,” a sculpture by artist Vanessa German created in 2014
- Saturday Light Brigade Radio Show features interviews with members and community partners (2018)
- "Our Members, Our Story" captures 125 years of the history of the Aurora Reading Club (2019)
- The Aurora Reading Club in the "Afro-American Notes" of the Pittsburgh Press 2019
- www.AuroraReadingClubofPittsburgh.com

== Notable members ==
- Hallie Quinn Brown (1845 - 1949)
- Selma Burke (1900 – 1995)
- Vivian Ann Davidson Hewitt (1920 - 2022)
- Maida Springer Kemp (1910 – 2005)
- Jesse Matthews Vann (1885 – 1967)
