= Tanksley =

Tanksley is a surname. Notable people with the surname include:

- Ann Tanksley (born 1934), American artist
- Charles B. Tanksley (born 1952), American politician
- Steven D. Tanksley (born 1954), American academic
