= Juan Logan =

American artist

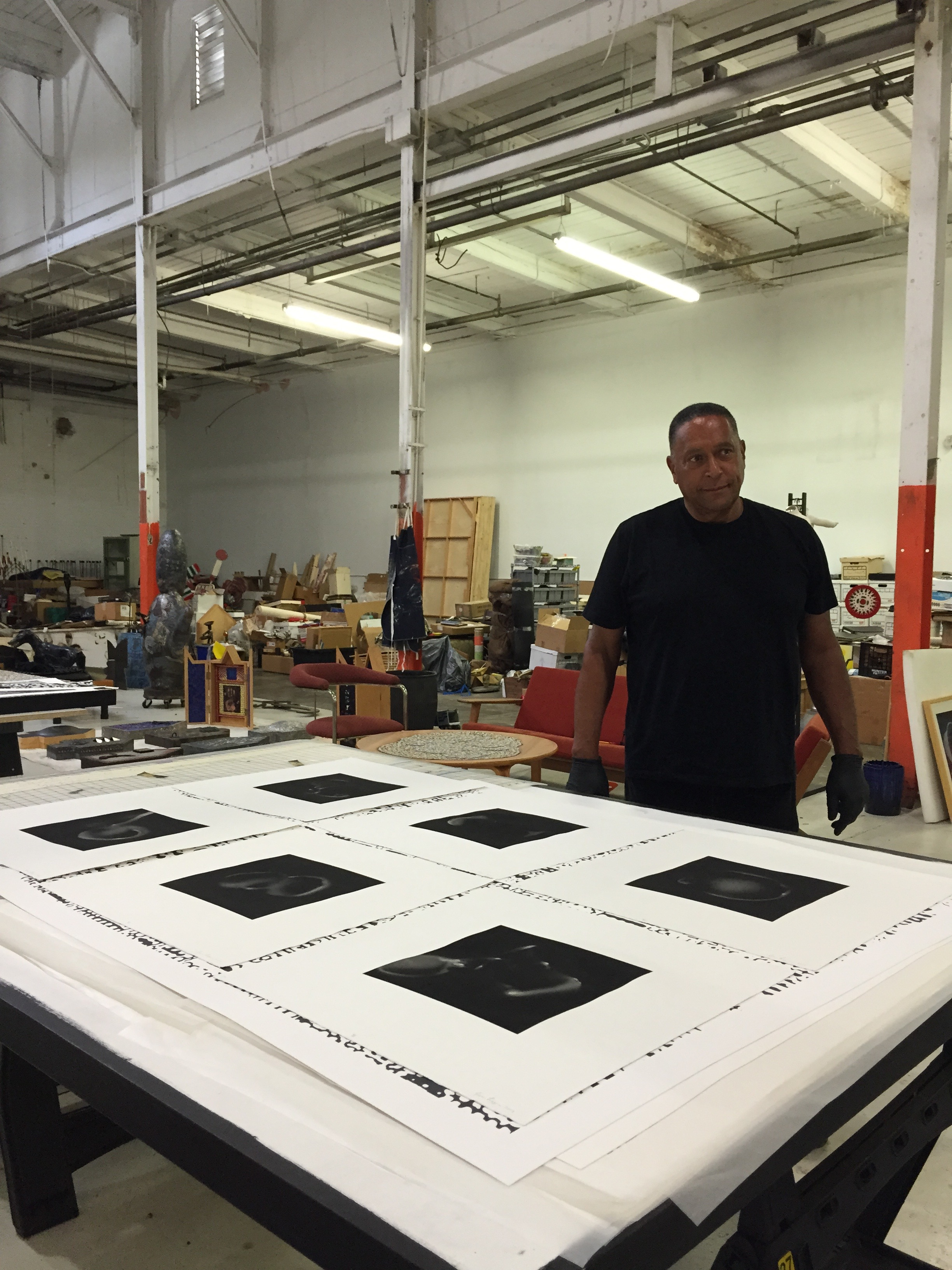
- Born: Juan Logan; August 16, 1946 (age 79); Nashville, Tennessee, U.S.
- Known for: Conceptual art, multimedia art, painting, sculpture, installation
- Awards: Fellowships from the John Michael Kohler Arts Center, North Carolina Arts Council, the Mid Atlantic Arts Foundation, the Rutgers Center for Innovative Print and Paper, the Carolina Postdoctoral Scholars Fellowship, and the Phillip Morris Companies

Juan Logan (born August 16, 1946) is an American artist from Nashville, Tennessee. His paintings, sculptures, and installations are reflective of his experiences of racial and institutional power structures in the South and prompt viewers to consider social responsibility.

== Early life ==
Juan Logan was born in Nashville, Tennessee, to John Louie Logan, a minister and founder of John Calvin Presbyterian Church, and Madge Sarah Jane Grier, an elementary school teacher. When his father became ill, the family moved from Nashville to his father's home town in Marion, North Carolina in 1949. John Louie Logan died later that year. Madge Grier remarried in 1950, and four years later the family moved to her birthplace, Belmont, North Carolina. Juan and his family moved into a new house built by his grandfather James W.W. Grier and several other family members.

Logan's interest in art began in 1960 while attending Reid High School, the black high school in Belmont at the time.

=== Education ===
Growing up in a black farming community was critical to Logan's ability to see and create "things". The process of making objects was very important to his stepfather, as well as his grandfather James William Washington Grier. The family took pride in finding innovative solutions for creating objects instead of purchasing them, and stressed the importance of self-sufficiency.

After graduating high school in 1964, Logan attended Howard University in Washington, D.C. His hope was to major in science like his older brother John, who had majored in chemistry. Logan began his academic career with the intention of focusing on biology with a specialization in microbiology. He came to realize that his interest was not in science, but in art. At the university, he was exposed to James A. Porter, James Wells, and Lois Mailou Jones, who influenced his creative development.

After a brief stay at Howard, Logan moved on to Clark College (now Clark Atlanta University) to study art. Floyd Coleman was the chairman of the department, and was very supportive of Logan. "Floyd Coleman was the first artist I'd ever encountered who was really dealing with political issues in an in-your-face kind of way. His paintings provided me with the impetus to explore both social and political concerns." Logan later realized he could do this through the use of color, image, symbol and metaphor, elements which remain a critical part of his work.

After leaving Clark, Logan joined the US Air Force in 1967 and served as a jet engine mechanic active in the Vietnam War. His military experience was crucial to shaping his exploration of American social and political constructs in his artwork. A number of his paintings, including I Am Black and Black American Dream from the late 60s and early 70s, responded to that experience. Logan's choice to use the language of abstraction in these and subsequent works provided him with an opportunity to explore ideas more broadly than realism, in his opinion, provided.

Logan received his MFA in 1998 from the Maryland Institute College of Art, Mount Royal School in Baltimore, where the focus of his studies was painting and mixed-media sculpture.

== Career ==
In addition to creating his own work, Logan is the Conservation Manager at Vollis Simpson Whirligig Project, where he actively restored 31 large-scale sculptures created by artist Vollis Simpson for the city of Wilson, North Carolina.

He is a retired professor of studio art at the University of North Carolina Chapel Hill.

Logan was selected as one of the designers for the original iteration of the North Carolina Freedom Monument Project, a public park in Raleigh.

He has had solo exhibitions including in New Orleans at the Ogden Museum of Southern Art; in Miami at N'Namdi Contemporary; in Greensboro, North Carolina at the Weatherspoon Art Museum; in Charlotte, North Carolina at the Gantt Center; in Duluth, Minnesota at Tweed Museum of Art; in Colorado at the Boulder Museum of Contemporary Art; in Washington D.C. at The World Bank; and in New York at the June Kelly Gallery.

Logan was a 2001 Artist-in-Residence at the McColl Center for Art + Innovation in Charlotte, NC.

His work is in many public and corporate collections such as Whitney Museum of American Art, Philadelphia Museum of Art, National Museum of African Art, Mint Museum of Art, Baltimore Museum of Art, and the Art in Embassies Program in Togo and South Africa.

Logan was selected for support from many foundations including the Pollination Project for his interactive, traveling Waiting Project.

Logan's work appeared in the exhibition REMIX at the Columbia Museum of Art in 2016.

== Personal life ==
Logan currently resides in Belmont, North Carolina. He is married to curator Jonell Logan.
