= Deccan Park (building) =

General information
- Location: Hyderabad, Telangana, India
- Construction started: 2000
- Completed: 2004

Design and construction
- Architect: Mario Botta

Deccan Park is the single largest Global Development Center (GDC) commissioned in Hyderabad, Telangana, India. The facility is designed by Swiss architect, Mario Botta.

== The facility ==
The Deccan Park has been set up with an estimated investment of Rs 1.50 billion with recreation and sporting facilities, which will house 2,200 professionals. The centre has been set up in 11 acres (45,000 m^{2}) of land, with a built-up area around 320,000 sq ft (9 floors). The GDC will be the centre of excellence in domain areas such as telecom, e-governance, biological sciences, ports and shipping and also deploy cutting-edge technologies including .Net, open source billing and bioinformatics.

== Inauguration ==
The Deccan Park was inaugurated by Pascal Couchepin, President of Swiss Confederation, in the presence of N. Chandrababu Naidu, Chief Minister of State, Arun Shourie, Minister for Divestment and IT and Communications, and IT, Ratan Tata, Chairman of Tata Sons.
