= Cymbalista Synagogue and Jewish Heritage Center =

Synagogue of Tel Aviv University, Tel Aviv, Israel

Cymbalista Synagogue
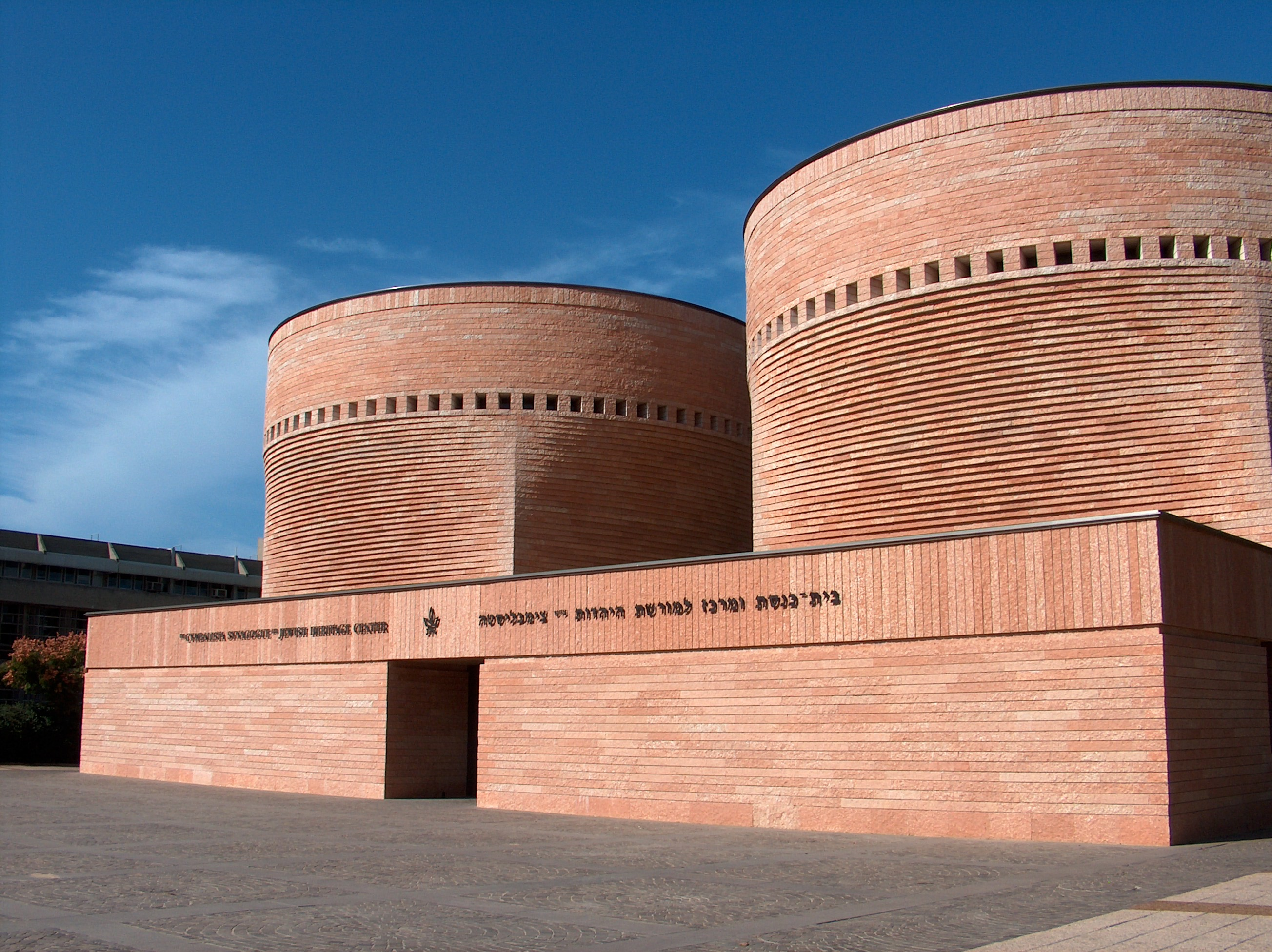
- Southerly entrance to the synagogue and heritage center

- Location of the synagogue in Greater Tel Aviv

Religion
- Affiliation: Judaism
- Ecclesiastical or organisational status: Synagogue; Heritage center
- Ownership: Tel Aviv University
- Status: Active

Location
- Location: Tel Aviv University, Tel Aviv, Tel Aviv District
- Country: Israel
- Coordinates: 32°06′45″N 34°48′19″E

Architecture
- Architect: Mario Botta
- Type: Synagogue architecture
- Style: Modernist
- Funded by: Paulette and Norbert Cymbalista
- Completed: 1998

Specifications
- Interior area: 800 m^{2} (8,600 sq ft)
- Spire: Two (towers)
- Spire height: 13.5 m (44 ft)
- Materials: Brick

Website
- en-heritage.tau.ac.il

The Cymbalista Synagogue and Jewish Heritage Center is a Jewish congregation, synagogue, and cultural center, owned and operated by the Tel Aviv University, in Tel Aviv, in the Tel Aviv District of Israel. The building was designed in the Modernist style by Mario Botta in 1996 and constructed between 1997 and 1998. Paulette and Norbert Cymbalista helped to fund the eponymous building.

In 2022, the building was designated as a protected heritage site by the Council for the Conservation of Heritage Sites in Israel.

== Architecture ==
The floor plan of the building comprises approximately 800 m^{2} (8,600 sq ft). From a rectangular base rise two matching towers both square in plan and merging to circles at their highest points of 13.5 m (44 ft). A rectangular lobby connects the two towers. The original architectural form of the towers is a realisation in stone of the geometrical squaring the circle. In each tower at the circular top is installed a square "canopy" which drapes natural light onto the walls of the hybrid cylinder and rectangle volume. These installations resemble the traditional Jewish wedding canopy, the chuppah, here permanent and poetically cast in light. The Torah Ark is partially lit by translucent onyx. An inscription above it, from Psalms 16:8, reads in Hebrew: שויתי יהוה לנגדי תמיד, lit. 'I have set the LORD always before me'.

=== Architectural context ===
The Cymbalista Synagogue and Jewish Heritage Center was made early in a time when famous architects where designing many high profile buildings in Israel, and developing a form of creative contemporary architecture around Jewish institutions. One such institution, the Jewish Museum Berlin, hosted an exhibition, Jewish Identity in Architecture which featured the Cymbalista Synagogue. Earlier international architects had designed synagogues in their signature modern ways: Beth Sholom Congregation, in Pennsylvania by Frank Lloyd Wright; and the proposed redesign of the Hurva Synagogue by Louis Kahn. Botta had designed the building for the San Francisco Museum of Modern Art a few years before and then the Évry Cathedral, with a similar cylindrical shape, just prior. The Cymbalista Synagogue and Jewish Heritage Center was the twelfth and culminating project in a series of religious works by Botta which were shown in London at the Royal Institute of British Architects in an exhibition entitled, Architetture del Sacro: Prayers in Stone.

== Gallery ==
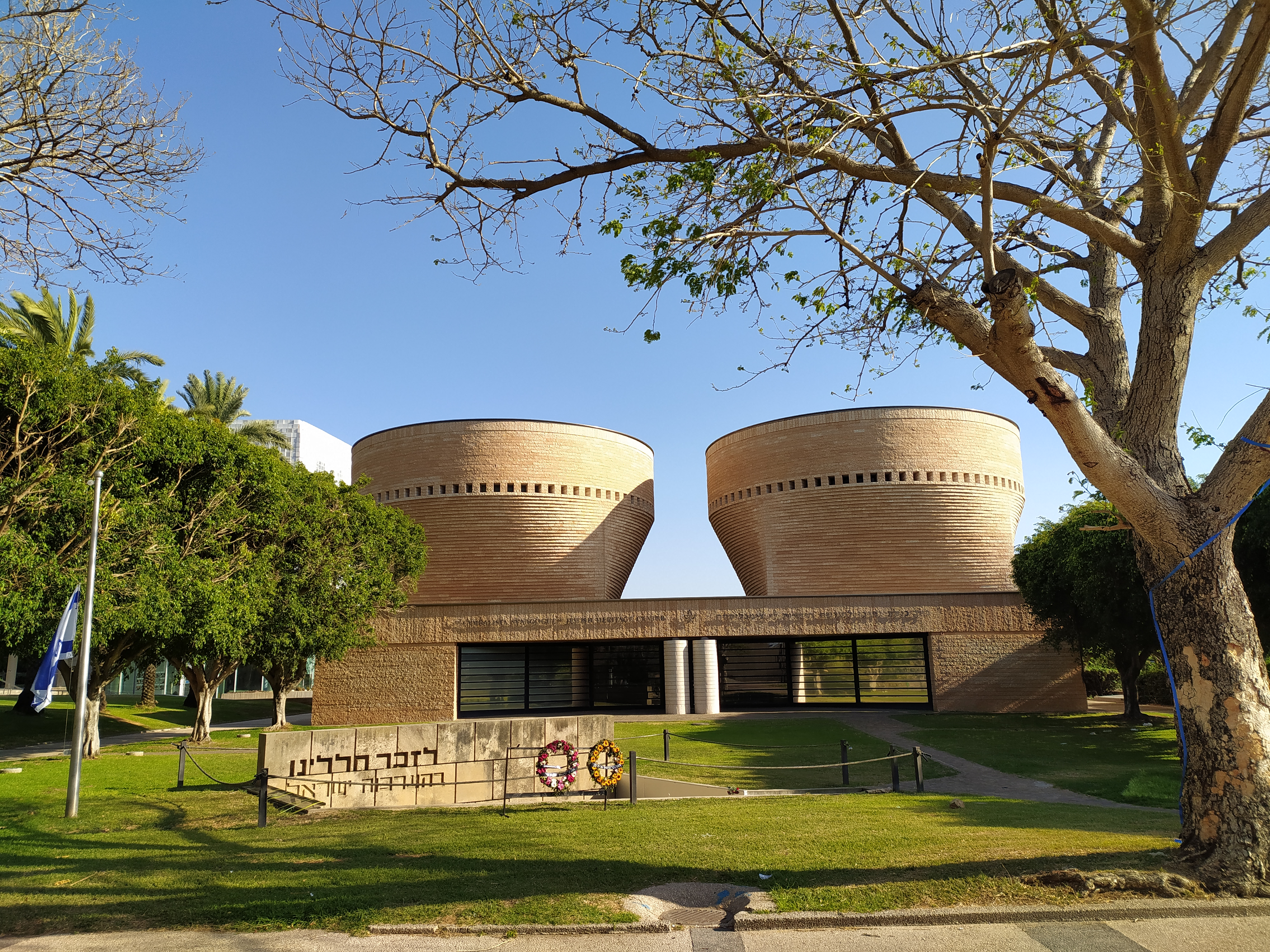
The exterior of the building

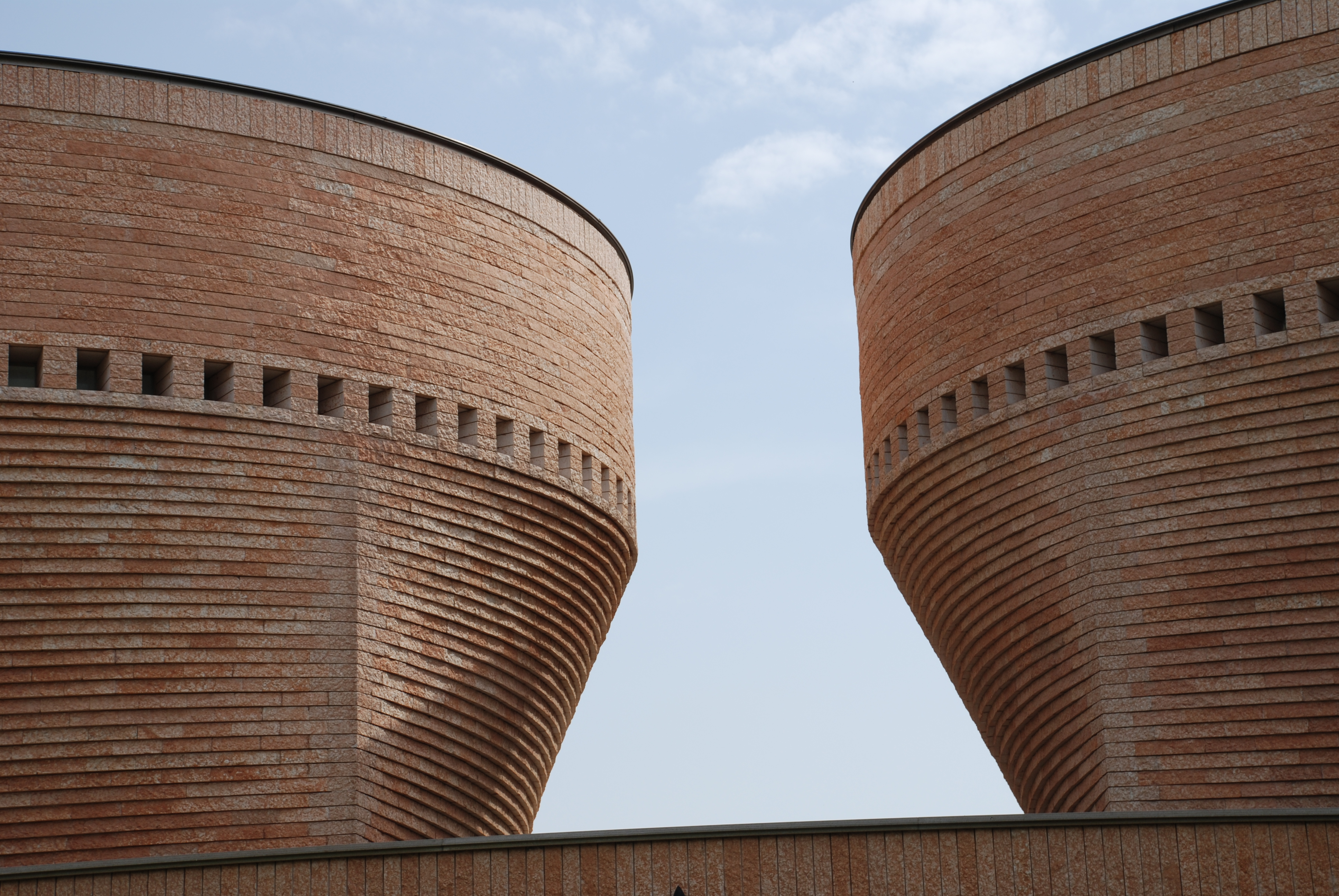
Closeup of the two towers

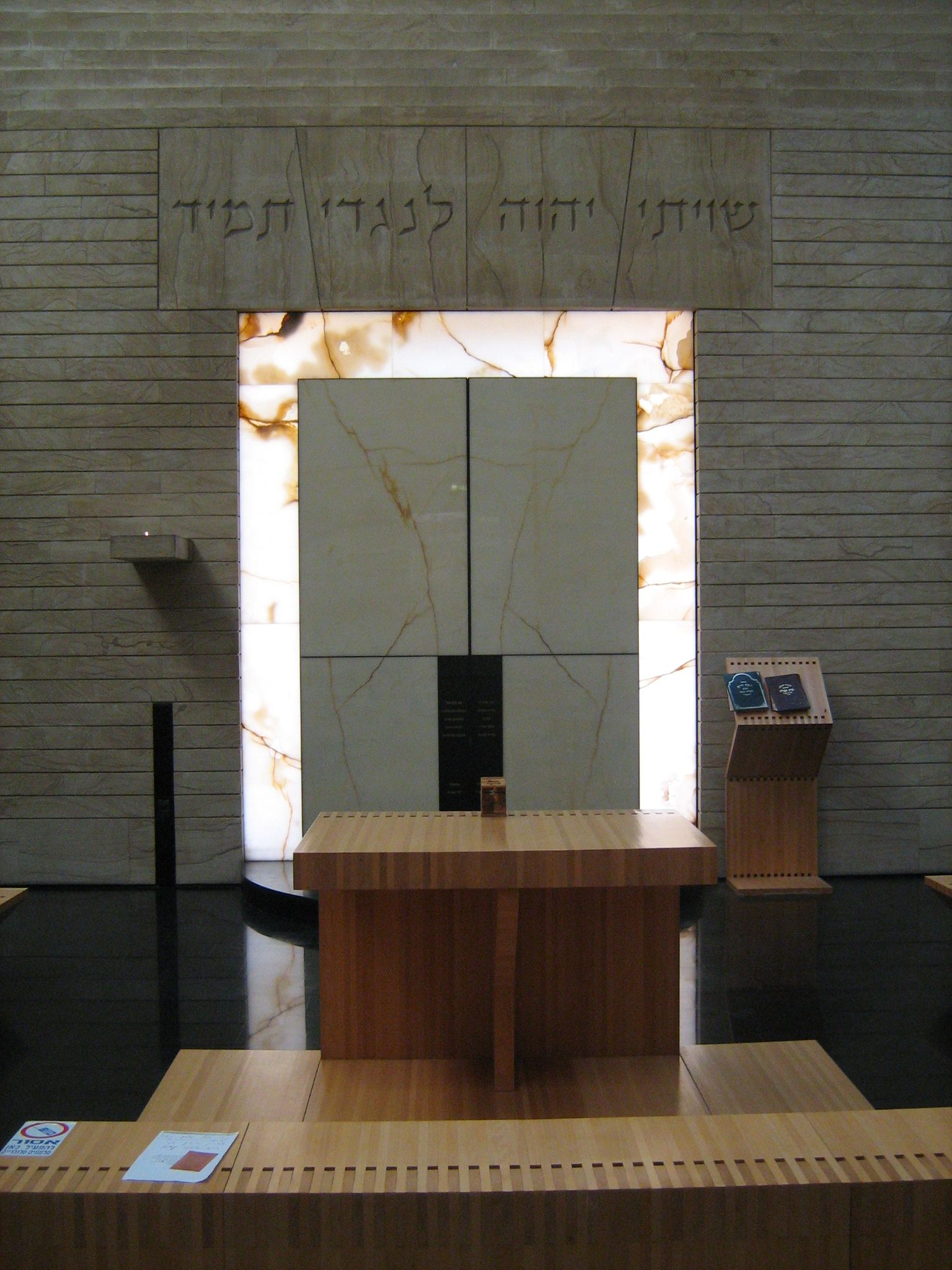
Closeup of the Torah Ark and the onyx around it

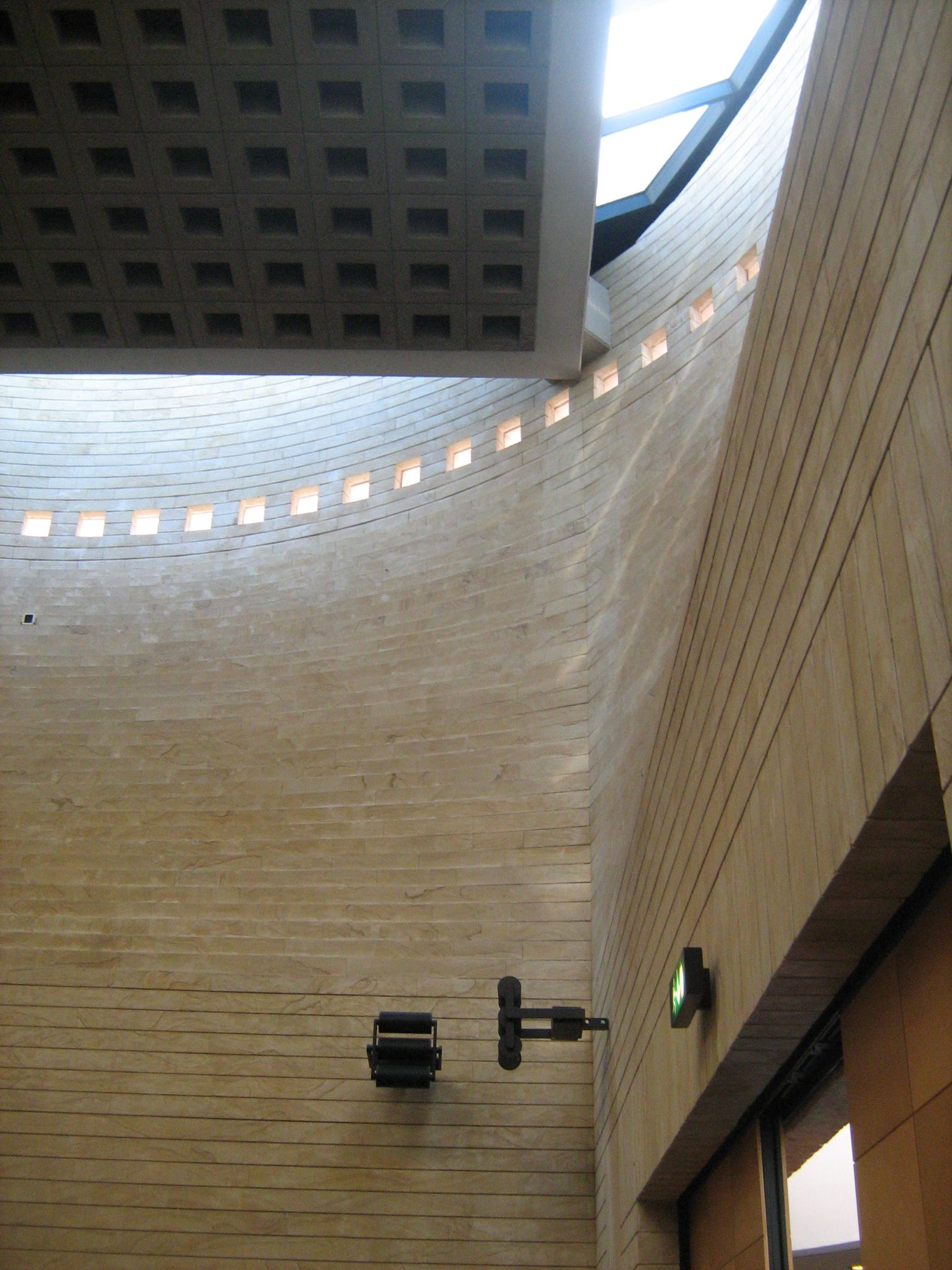
Detail of the connection of the canopy to the walls of the auditorium

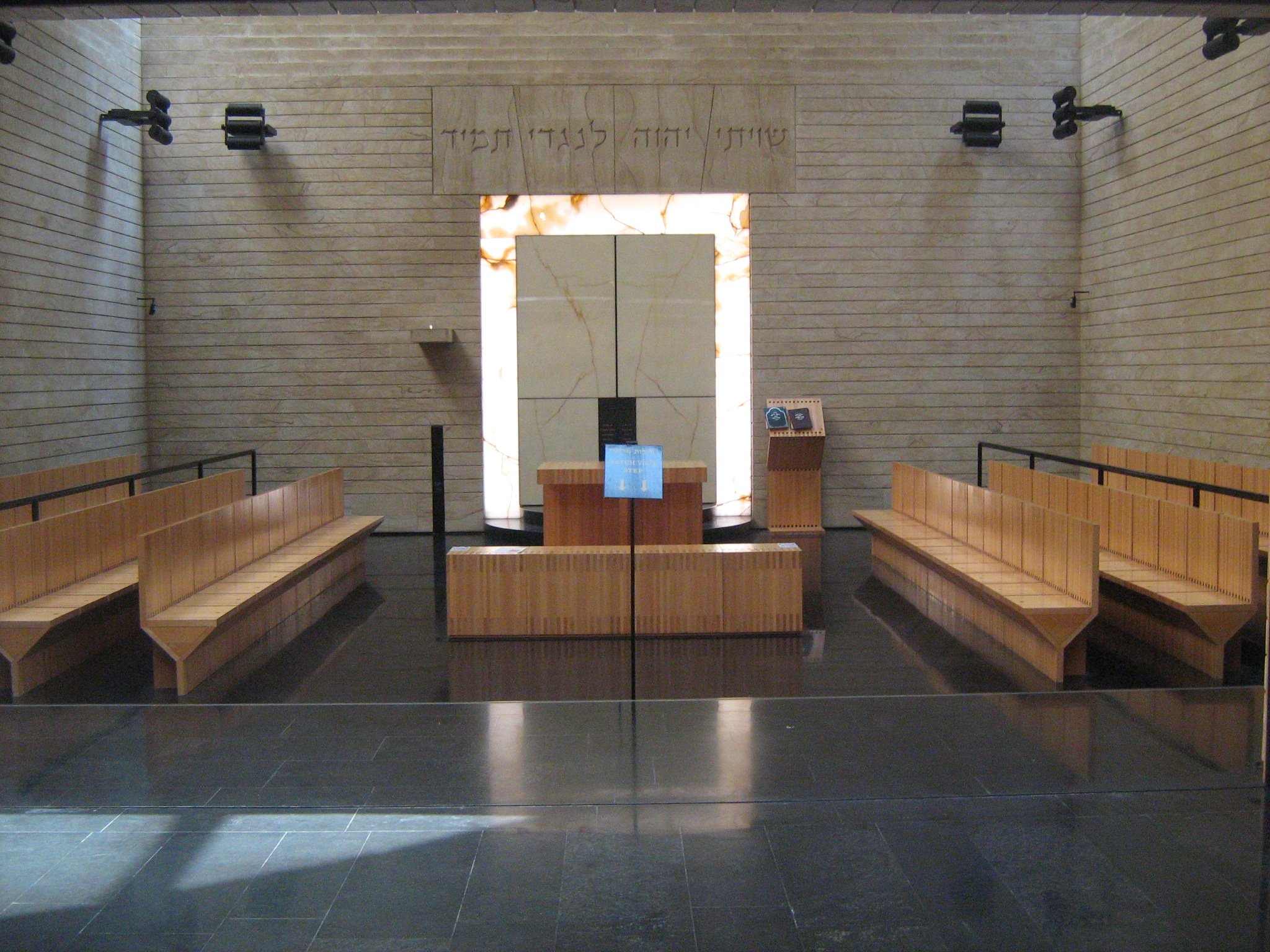
View of the auditorium of the synagogue

== See also ==
- History of the Jews in Israel
- List of synagogues in Israel
- Art in Tel Aviv
