= Rena Sakellaridou =

Greek architect (born 1955)

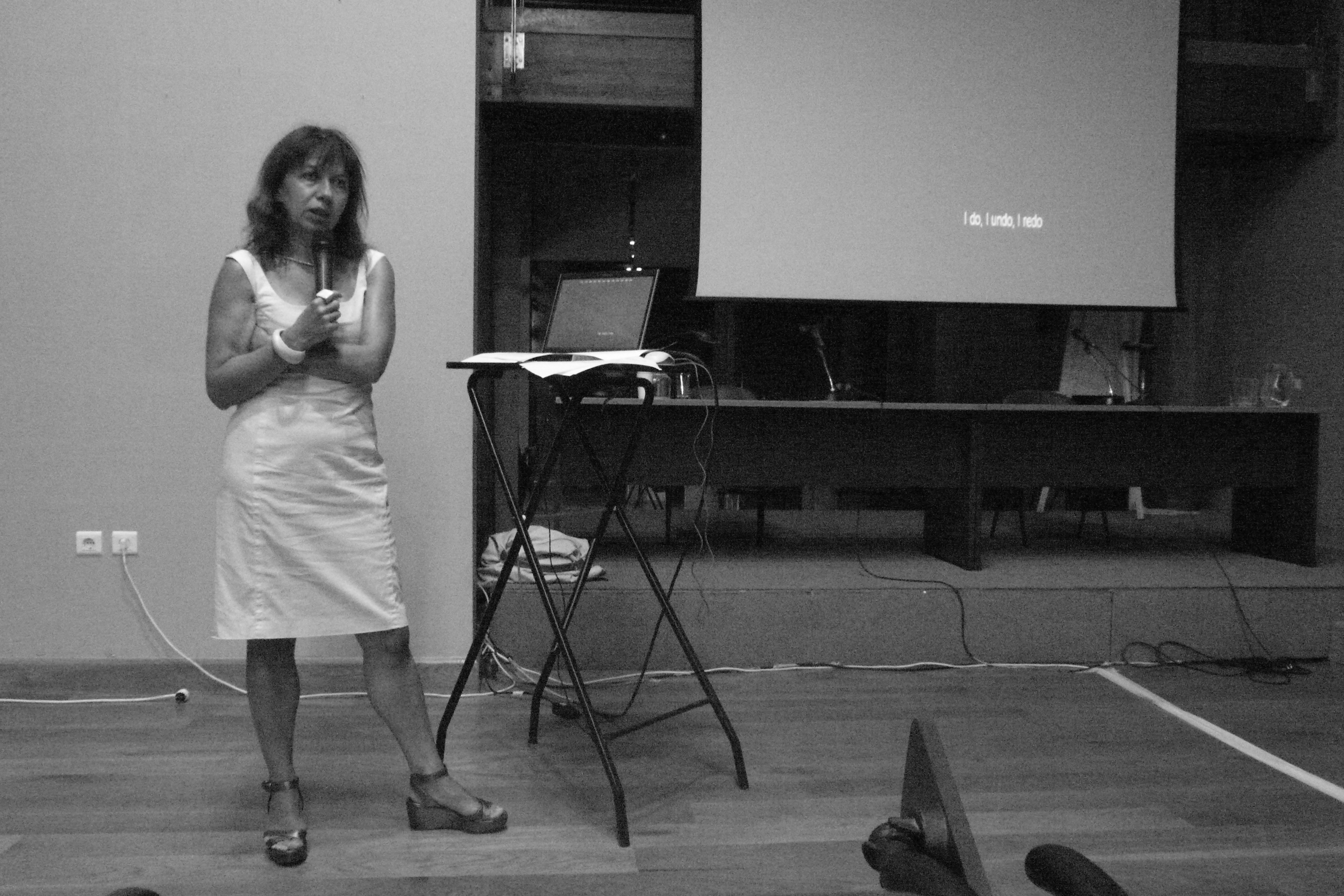
Sakellaridou giving a presentation at Kam Workshops 2009 in Crete

Rena Sakellaridou (Greek: Ρένα Σακελλαρίδου, born October 16, 1955) is a Greek architect who, along with Morpho Papanikolaou, is founding partner of the Greek architecture firm SPARCH. The author of Mario Botta: Architectural Poetics and Sea Voyage: Photography by Erieta Attali, she is a professor of Architectural Design at the School of Architecture of The Aristotle University of Thessaloniki. She is known for her research, writing, and design focusing on form, space, and composition. Sakellaridou has been nominated for the Mies van der Rohe and arcVision awards for women in architecture. She also was featured in the exhibition "Frau Architekt" at the Goethe Institute in Athens in the spring of 2021, recognized as a female architect who "has made a mark on the evolution of Greek architecture in the past 100 years." SPARCH, like Sakellaridou, is well-recognized, having received numerous international and national design awards, including by the Hellenic Institute of Architecture.

== Early life and education ==
For Sakellaridou, architecture emerged as a profession over time. As a child, she remembers her non-architectural dreams of being a captain on the seas, as she was born in the port city of Pythagoreion, as well as her later considerations of law school in light of her father being a judge. Still, a sense of space has been important to Sakellaridou since her earliest experiences. She decided to study architecture in the 4th grade of high school: having written a report on beauty, which was read on the radio, Sakellaridou resolved to explore architecture.

Sakellaridou received a Dipl in architecture in Thessaloniki at the Aristotle University of Thessaloniki, a MArch in Vancouver at The University of British Columbia, and a Ph.D in London at The Bartlett School of Architecture and Planning. She credits her mother for encouraging her path abroad, and she acknowledges that her Canadian experience, by broadening her horizons, enabled her to begin to realize her dreams. She also recognizes that her PhD studies in London trained her to clear her thoughts of the superfluous.

== Career Highlights and Design Rationale ==
Sakellaridou sees architecture as the poetics of space and form, organized into an integrated whole through architectural order, materiality, and light. This organization is a process of setting limits, taking into account parameters like materiality. For Sakellaridou, setting limits—taking things, needs, and requirements and expressing them—so as to make something out of nothing is the work of composition. Doing well this work of composition, and of bringing to life what others don't know or see—of crafting space—requires not only a deep love for design, but also deep knowledge and training, and the opportunity to immerse oneself in one's art and what it means.

These architectural tenets of space and form, order and composition, find expression in Sakellaridou's analysis of the oeuvre of Swiss architect Mario Botta in her 2000 book Mario Botta: Architectural Poetics. Sakellaridou characterizes Botta's design work:

By exploring the expressive potential of his space and form, never ceasing to experiment with them, Botta continuously invents what is a strong possibility in the vast universe of unrealized architectural probability. He investigates the limits of his discipline and lets his intuition be guided by order. He interrogates the existing and carries forward memories of the old. He shapes the new and designs limits for space through boundaries and clear outlines...

Botta's approach that skillfully integrates new and old is seen in Sekallaridou's own work of the expansion of the Aristotle University of Thessaloniki Library, which she designed along with Papanikolaou and with Anastassios Kotsiopoulos. With the growth of the university and the need to expand the library, the decision was made to locate much of the expansion space underground, following a larger university strategy of underground construction that aimed to restore the campus's urban fabric. The newer wing, on the northeast side of the preexisting 1960s Main Library, was built in 1999 and features a symmetrical rectangular form designed around a cylindrical atrium. The result is a building described as an inspiring invention containing majestic space and providing calming comfort for students.

=== Large Projects and Innovation ===
One of Sakellaridou's foremost works is the 30,000 m^{2} Agemar Headquarters for the Angelicoussis Maritime Group of Companies in Athens, completed in 2018. The fluid geometry of the shape suggests a form flowing on the sea. The reinforced concrete building houses five floors of open-plan offices, bridge and engine simulators for maritime use, an amphitheater, a ground-floor library, a company museum, roof gardens, a vertical garden, a restaurant, and a gym.

Another of SPARCH's larger projects is the NBG Insurance Headquarters complex in Athens, which represents a collaboration with Botta. The office complex features two main solid forms arranged around a public square, facilitating views of the nearby Acropolis, and an atrium filled with glass skywalks. The project, which lies substantially underground so as to minimize the impact on the urban fabric, emphasizes movement and light by transforming masses to voids. Sakellaridou highlights that the project is typical of Botta's style in its symmetry, geometry, and solid form. The collaboration of Botta and Sakellaridou is notable in light of the latter's scholarship about the former in Mario Botta: Architectural Poetics.

== Additional Works ==
- Electra Palace, Thessaloniki, 2020 (renovation)
- Iaso Thessaly General Hospital, Larissa, 2009
- Astir Palace Gate & Entrance Canopy (for 5-Star Hotel complex), Athens, 2008
- Horizontal House, Thessaloniki, 2008
- NBG Cultural Foundation Bookstore, Thessaloniki, 2007
- Limani Business Center, Thessaloniki, 2003
- New National Bank Office Building, Thessaloniki, 2002
