= Bechtler Museum of Modern Art =

Museum in Charlotte, North Carolina

Coordinates: 35.2244°N 80.8473°W

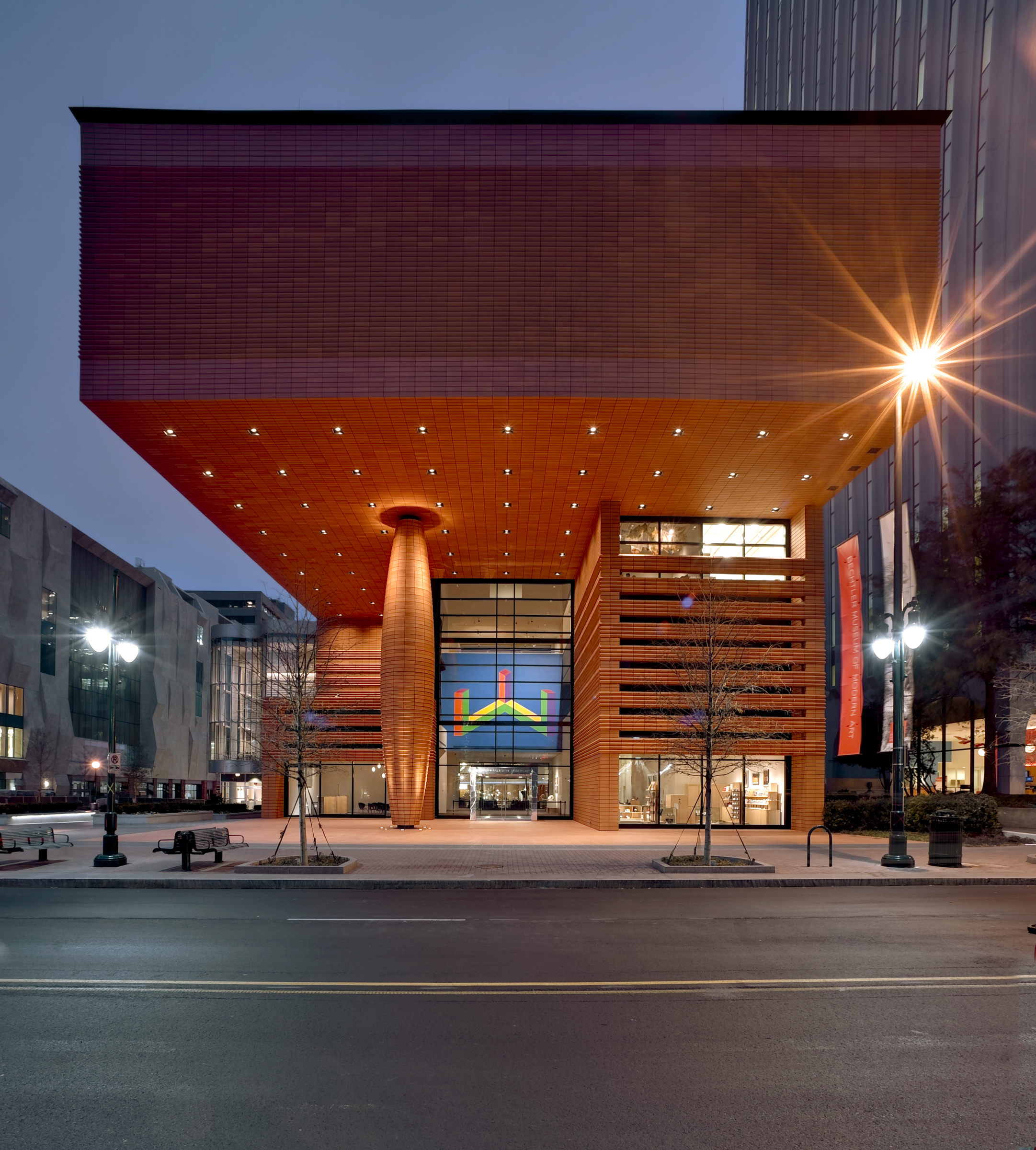
- Established: January 2, 2010
- Location: 420 South Tryon Street; Charlotte, North Carolina
- President: Todd DeShields Smith
- Website: www.bechtler.org

The Bechtler Museum of Modern Art in Charlotte, North Carolina, is a 36,500-square-foot (3,390 m^{2}) museum space dedicated to the exhibition of mid-20th-century modern art. The modern art museum is part of the new Levine Center for the Arts in Uptown Charlotte. The museum building was designed by architect Mario Botta.

The museum is named after the family of Andreas Bechtler, a Charlotte resident and native of Switzerland who assembled and inherited a collection of more than 1,400 artworks created by major figures of 20th-century modernism. The Bechtler Museum of Modern Art opened to the public on January 2, 2010, with former mayor of Charlotte Anthony Foxx and Andreas Bechtler in attendance.

== Architecture ==
Designed by Swiss architect Mario Botta, this museum has four floors and contains an outdoor courtyard, 47 foot weight-bearing column, and terracotta-tiled cubic exterior.

A notable feature is a glass atrium in the multi-story foyer that scales the museum's face, diffusing natural light throughout the building. It features the 23-foot mural Wall Drawing 995 by American artist Sol LeWitt, which was installed in October 2009 and is on long-term loan from his estate. The building's dominant feature is the cantilevered fourth floor gallery, half of which extends from the core of the building as an overhang, supported by a column rising from the plaza below.

Inside, Botta employed a palette of materials which include steel, glass, terra cotta, black granite, polished concrete and wood. Botta also designed select pieces of furniture for the museum including the reception desk, café bar, gallery benches and hanging globe lights.

The museum is the only other structure in the country designed by Swiss architect Mario Botta, who also designed the San Francisco Museum of Modern Art.

== Collection ==
The Bechtler collection reflects most of the important art movements and schools from the 20th century with a deep holding of the School of Paris after World War II. The collection comprises mid-century modern art in various media by artists such as Alberto Giacometti, Joan Miró, Max Ernst, Andy Warhol, Jean Tinguely, Barbara Hepworth and Pablo Picasso. Many of the artists are represented by their exploration of a particular theme or subject matter through a variety of media and approaches.

=== Focus areas ===
Specific focus areas of the collection are:

- European Perspective
  - The holdings of the Bechtler reveal principally the tastes and opportunities of a family of collectors based in Zurich, Switzerland. Nonetheless, the works they acquired were by artists from throughout Europe, Britain and America but all seen through their own personal lens.
- School of Paris
  - School of Paris is a term that has unusually broad applications but generally is meant to embrace the modern works in Europe during the years after World War II. Most often defined by various approaches to abstraction, the School of Paris is seen as flexible enough to embrace certain explorations in figural subjects.
- American and British Artists
  - In addition to a focus on European artists, the Bechtler collection is also rich in American and British artists, often as a result of personal relationships. American Mark Tobey, for example, practiced for many years in Zurich, Switzerland and was acquainted with the Bechtler family. A cluster of British artists formed relationships with the Bechtlers, especially Ben Nicholson who often spent his summers in Ascona, the Italian region of Switzerland, and served as an artistic mentor to a teenage Andreas Bechtler.

Only a handful of these artworks have been on public view in the United States before the opening of the Bechtler. Until now, the collection was privately held by the Bechtler family of Switzerland.

=== The Firebird ===
The Firebird or Le Grand Oiseau de Feu sur l'Arche, a sculpture by Franco-American artist Niki de Saint Phalle, was completed in 1991. The Firebird is 17 feet, 5 inches tall and weighs 1,433 pounds. It is composed of an estimated 7,500 mirror mosaics over polyester on steel armature.

In 2006 the piece was purchased by Andreas Bechtler. The sculpture was installed on the plaza of the museum in October 2009. The sculpture underwent conservation for four days, and was unveiled to the public on November 3, 2009. It is now a permanent part of the Bechtler Museum of Modern Art collection.

== Bechtler family ==
Hans Bechtler credited his brother Walter for leading the way to the family's interest in modern art. In 1950 the brothers began to visit the Kunsthaus Zürich. They frequented local galleries, purchased art and made friends with artists. These early forays into the art world led Hans and his wife Bessie on a journey of almost 70 years in which the couple amassed a collection of incredible depth and diversity. The couple preferred art that revealed the working methods of the artist, and to this end acquired drawings and other preparatory work related to the artists' total oeuvre. The Bechtler brothers incorporated art into their workplaces and the family passed on the admiration for modern art and respect for the artists to their children.

Andreas, the son of Hans and Bessie, grew up around artists and became an artist himself as well as an entrepreneur. Business holdings brought Andreas Bechtler to Charlotte, North Carolina and he chose to make the city his permanent home. After inheriting a portion of his parents' extensive collection, and augmenting it with his own acquisitions, Andreas decided to commit the collection to the city of Charlotte.

== See also ==
- Mint Museum of Art
- Mint Museum of Craft + Design
- North Carolina Blumenthal Performing Arts Center
- Uptown Charlotte
- Charlotte metropolitan area
