= Loonis McGlohon =

American jazz musician

- Born: September 29, 1921; Ayden, North Carolina
- Died: January 26, 2002 (aged 80)
- Occupation: Jazz musician

Loonis McGlohon (September 29, 1921 – January 26, 2002) was an American songwriter and jazz pianist.

== Biography ==
McGlohon was born in Ayden, North Carolina, and graduated from East Carolina University. After a spell in the Air Force during World War II, he played with the Jimmy Dorsey and Jack Teagarden orchestras and became involved with broadcasting in Charlotte, North Carolina, working as music director for WBT (AM) radio and WBTV (Charlotte's CBS-TV affiliate).

McGlohon was an accompanist to many well-known singers including Judy Garland, Mabel Mercer and Eileen Farrell. He was co-host of the Peabody Award-winning NPR radio series American Popular Song with his friend and collaborator, Alec Wilder. Among the songs that McGlohon wrote with Wilder are "Blackberry Winter" and "Be a Child". McGlohon, like Wilder, could write both music and lyrics, and for the song "Songbird" he wrote both. With Wilder, he also wrote music and lyrics for the former North Carolina outdoor attraction Land of Oz.

For his hometown of Charlotte, North Carolina McGlohon wrote the music for LeGette Blythe's outdoor drama, "The Hornet's Nest," staged in June and July, 1968 at a new amphitheater at the University of North Carolina - Charlotte. The two principal songs were, "This is the Day!" and "What Will the World be Like!" McGlohon allowed the College of William and Mary Choir to include "This is the day!" in its repertoire for many years.

In 1980, Frank Sinatra recorded two of McGlohon's songs with Alec Wilder - "South to a Warmer Place" and "A Long Night" - on the album She Shot Me Down. In 1985, he was commissioned (with his friend Charles Kuralt) to write a piece in celebration of North Carolina's 400th birthday. The result was North Carolina Is My Home, a symphonic work with narration and vocals which became a recording, public TV broadcast, live presentation and coffee table book. McGlohon was inducted into the North Carolina Music Hall of Fame in 1999. At the age of 80, he died following a long-term battle with lymphoma.

== Legacy ==
NationsBank Performance Place in Charlotte's Spirit Square was named Loonis McGlohon Theatre in an event on January 9, 1998. In 2022, it was announced that a bronze statue of McGlohon would be erected in the Trail of History in Charlotte.
