= Deccan Park (park) =

Park in Telangana, India

- Type: Public
- Location: Qutb Shahi tombs, Hyderabad
- Operator: QQSUDA

Deccan Park is a 31-acre public park located near Quli Qutb Shahi tombs in Hyderabad, Telangana, India. The work ran into controversy right from its inception in 1984, since it is adjoining the historic monuments.

The park was originally planned to inaugurate in 2002, but opened in 2017.
