= Vivian Davidson Hewitt =

American art collector and librarian (1920–2022)

- Born: Vivian Davidson; February 17, 1920; New Castle, Pennsylvania, U.S.
- Died: May 29, 2022 (aged 102); New York, New York, U.S.
- Education: Geneva College; Carnegie Mellon University
- Occupations: Librarian; art collector
- Spouse(s): John Hamilton Hewitt, Jr.
- Children: 1

Vivian Ann Davidson Hewitt (February 17, 1920 – May 29, 2022) was an American art collector, specializing in African-American art, and a librarian. She was Pittsburgh’s first African American librarian, and later became the first African American president of the Special Libraries Association. Her art collection, which she and her husband, John H. Hewitt, Jr., amassed over fifty years, is considered one of the finest collections of artwork by African-American artists and is on exhibit at the Harvey B. Gantt Center for African-American Arts + Culture in Charlotte, N.C. In 2016, she was awarded the honorary title of Dame by Queen Elizabeth II of Great Britain.

== Early life and education ==
Vivian Davidson was born in New Castle, Pennsylvania, on February 17, 1920. She was the fourth, out of five, children to Arthur Davidson, a waiter and butler, and his wife Lela, a teacher. Her parents were born in North Carolina; they moved to New Castle when Arthur was offered the position of butler to a Pennsylvania senator. Vivian Davidson attended the North Street School, George Washington Junior High and New Castle Senior High.

Davidson received her bachelor's degree from Geneva College, in Beaver Falls, Pennsylvania, in 1943. At Geneva, she studied French and psychology, was a member of the French and Writers clubs, and served as co-editor of The Chimes.

In 1944, she received a master's in library science from the Carnegie Institute of Technology (Carnegie Mellon University).

== Career ==
After she graduated from Carnegie Mellon, Hewitt was hired as the senior assistant librarian by the Carnegie Library of Pittsburgh, Wiley Avenue branch. She is believed to be the first African-American librarian in Pittsburgh.

In 1949, she moved to Atlanta, accepting a position as an instructor-librarian at Atlanta University (now Clark Atlanta University). In 1953 Hewitt moved to New York City and worked for the Crowell-Collier Publishing Co., then moved to be the librarian at the Rockefeller Foundation. Hewitt then became the librarian for the Carnegie Endowment for International Peace, in 1963 until her retirement in 1983.

Hewitt also served as the first black president of the Special Libraries Association (SLA) from 1978 to 1979.

== John and Vivian Hewitt Art Collection ==
Vivian and John Hewitt began collecting artwork when they traveled, focusing particularly on Haitian art. They also personally knew and collected artwork from New York-based African-American artists. Over fifty years, they purchased hundreds of sketches, paintings, and etchings. Fifty-eight pieces from this collection were purchased by Bank of America and donated to the Afro-American Cultural Center in Charlotte, North Carolina. The center was renamed the Harvey B. Gantt Center for African-American Arts + Culture in 2009. The John and Vivian Hewitt Collection of African-American Art includes work by Romare Bearden, Margaret Burroughs, Elizabeth Catlett, Jonathan Green, Jacob Lawrence, Ann Tanksley, and Henry Ossawa Tanner.

The Hewitts also donated about 60 pieces of art to Geneva College, her alma mater. "The Vivian Davidson Hewitt Collection: A Multicultural Legacy" was exhibited in 2011. The Hewitt collection is permanently housed in the East Reading Room of the Macartney Library.

== Personal and death ==
In 1949, Hewitt married John H. Hewitt, Jr., a professor at Morehouse College, who died in 1999. The Hewitts had one child, Dr. John Hamilton Hewitt III (1952-2022).

Hewitt died at her home in Manhattan on May 29, 2022, at the age of 102. She is survived by two granddaughters, and ten great grandchildren.

== Awards and honors ==
In 1978, Hewitt received an honorary doctorate from Geneva College.

In 1984, Vivian Hewitt was inducted into the Special Libraries Association's Hall of Fame.

In 2001, she was honored by Queen Elizabeth II with appointment to the Venerable Order of St John as a Serving Sister. She was promoted to Officer Sister in 2004, Commander Sister in 2009, and finally Dame in 2016.

In 2011, Hewitt was the speaker at Geneva College's annual Dr. King Night of the Arts.

In 2012, she served as the commencement speaker for the Center for Urban Biblical Ministry at Geneva College.

In 2017, Hewitt was honored as the Heinz History Maker of the Year in Education.

In 2017, she received an honorary doctorate degree from Carnegie Mellon University.
