= Spirit Square =

Coordinates: 35°13′45″N 80°50′24″W

Spirit Square, also called Spirit Square Center for the Arts, is located in Charlotte, North Carolina. Its McGlohon Theater in the former First Baptist Church on North Tryon Street, named for Loonis McGlohon, is now part of North Carolina Blumenthal Performing Arts Center.

== History ==
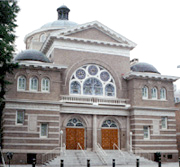
McGlohon Theatre

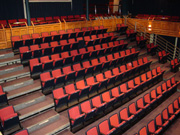
Duke Energy Theater

Spirit Square opened in 1976 as an arts center offering dance, visual arts, theater and music.

In 1972, First Baptist Church announced it was selling its buildings on North Tryon Street. In November 1974, Ferebee, Walters, and Associates said the cost of converting the old church into an arts center would be $1 million. In April 1975, a 100-member cultural arts committee asked Mecklenburg County commissioners to buy the buildings, which consultant Ralph Burgard said would improve the area. Commissioners voted to spend $335,000 to buy the buildings. A six-month study by Spirit Square Development Group, chaired by Alex McMillan, resulted in a plan to spend $300,000 to renovate the education building on Seventh Street, and $2.5 million on the sanctuary. On June 1, 1976, the property was leased to Spirit Square Arts Council Corp. for 25 years. County voters approved $2.5 million in bonds in April 1977. In January 1980 after a $200,000 grant from NCNB, the 800-seat theater was named NCNB Performance Place. Joel Grey performed at the black tie opening ceremony April 15, 1980. Knight Gallery opened in November 1983 with 2,900 square feet, the city's first nonprofit gallery for contemporary visual art.

In November 1985, the city gave Spirit Square $2.7 million for a renovation. As Spirit Square prepared to celebrate its 10th anniversary, a fund-raising campaign began in May 1986 for the rest of the $5.5 million expected cost. A $6.5 million renovation and 7,300-square-foot addition completed in 1990 gave the arts center the building that had been desired since it began, and a new entrance at 345 North College Street. Middleton McMillan architects had to use five buildings built between 1908 and 1980, some that were part of the church, and one which had been a printing plant. Ceiling heights and floor materials changed in the different buildings, making renovation challenging, and $400,000 had to be spent to remove asbestos after an estimate of only $75,000, due to incorrect plans. With changes in the interior design, the total space increased from 80,000 to 100,000 square feet. A carved rosette arch at the new entrance recalled J.M. McMichael, the architect of First Baptist. Stained glass from the church was taken out of storage and used to add character and recall history.

With the opening of the North Carolina Blumenthal Performing Arts Center in 1992, uptown Charlotte had a new location for performances. This led to a decreased role for Spirit Square as a location for events. In August 1995, Spirit Square agreed to a Charlotte-Mecklenburg Arts & Science Council recommendation to convert to an arts education center. In December of that year, it was announced that Spirit Square Center for Arts and Education would be taken over by the Blumenthal organization June 30, 1997.

The 720-seat NationsBank Performance Place was named Loonis McGlohon Theatre for Loonis McGlohon in a January 9, 1998 event.

Other venues began taking over some of the events. Great Aunt Stella Center (Formerally known as The African American Culture Center located on 7th street) became the new home of cultural festivals and many of the musical acts. Chamber music moved to local colleges. Soon the renamed theatre was seeing less use, partly because it was too small, but Children's Theatre of Charlotte had some performances there. By 1999, the 30-year-old Community School of the Arts was the main tenant. Actor's Theatre still used the 180-seat Duke Power Theatre, and North Carolina Dance Theatre used part of the space. Tryon Center for Visual Art used the galleries, and groups not related to the arts were renting space. For example, once again, the former church was being used as a church.

In 2007, Mecklenburg County wanted to sell part of the Spirit Square complex, but not McGlohon Theatre or Duke Power Theatre. In June 2006, commissioners voted to end subsidies that had reached $1.4 million a year. Instead, the county's focus would be on the new Wachovia cultural campus on South Tryon Street. By this time, Opera Carolina, Northwest School of the Arts and The Light Factory were using space and their futures were uncertain.

The 15-member Spirit Square Community Task Force began working to find a way to maximize the site's potential and still keep the historic character. Originally, the sale of the property would have helped to pay for the new uptown baseball stadium, and arts groups would have had to leave, but a different financing method was used for the stadium. Opera Carolina did leave and Northwest School was considering it. Expansion of the library's main branch next door had to be considered, since the library might use part of the property.

In 2008, a plan was announced to build a new main library and a 15-story tower while keeping McGlohon Theatre.
