= Mario Botta =

Swiss architect, born 1943

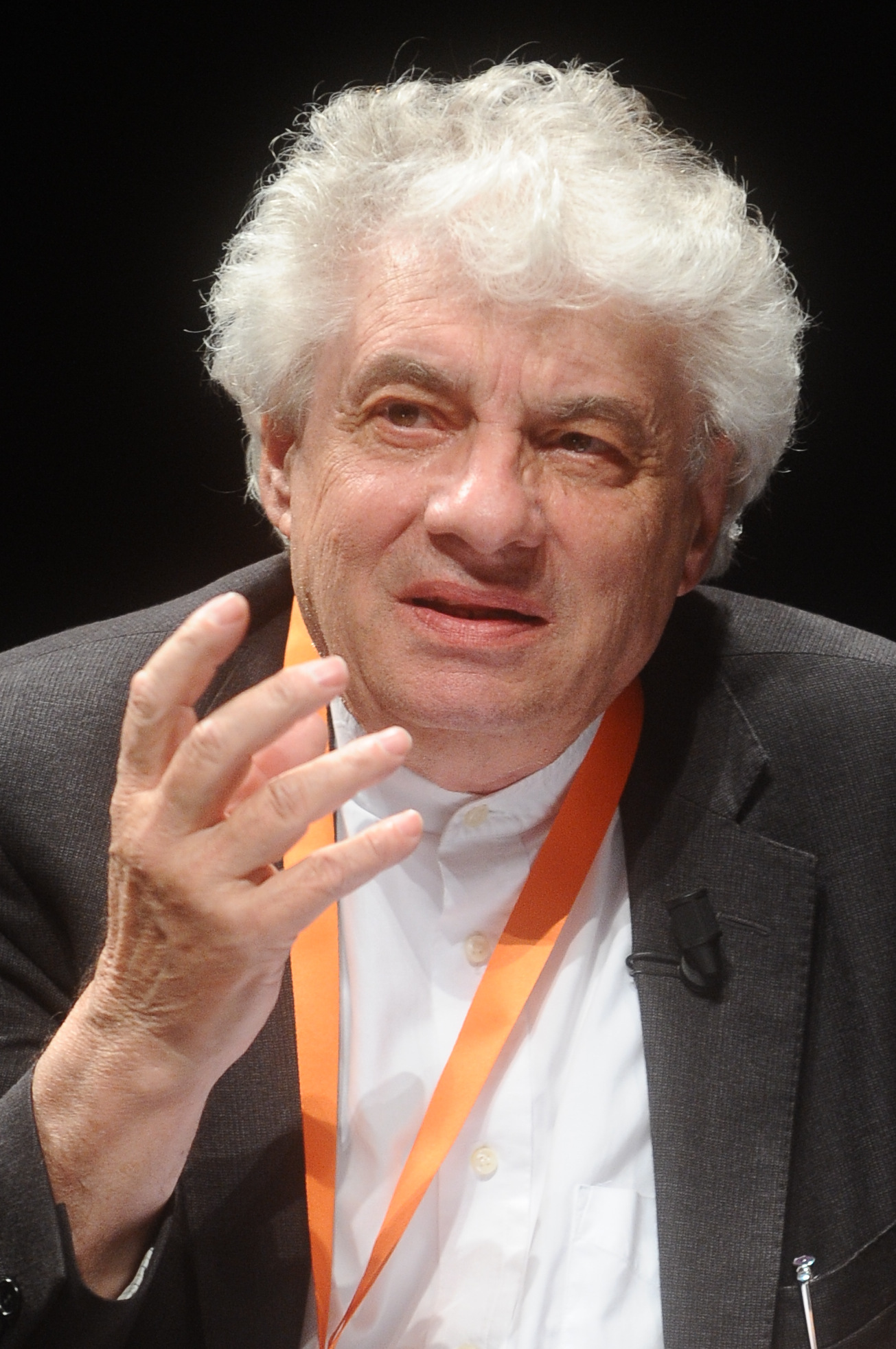
- Mario Botta (2016)
- Born: 1 April 1943 (age 83); Mendrisio, Switzerland
- Occupation: Architect
- Buildings: National Bank of Greece, Athens; San Francisco Museum of Modern Art; Bechtler Museum of Modern Art, Charlotte, NCKimbrell Fiber Innovation Center; Santa Maria degli Angeli, Monte Tamaro, Switzerland

Mario Botta (born 1 April 1943) is a Swiss architect. At age fifteen, Botta dropped out of secondary school and apprenticed with the architectural firm of Carloni and Camenisch in Lugano. After three years, he went to the Art College in Milan for his baccalaureate, and then to Università Iuav di Venezia for his professional degree in 1969. During his time in Venice, Botta got to meet and work with architects Carlo Scarpa, Louis Kahn and Le Corbusier. Botta started his own architectural practice in Lugano in 1970.

== Career ==
Botta designed his first building, a two-family house at Morbio Superiore in Ticino, at age 16. He graduated from the Università Iuav di Venezia (1969). While the arrangement of spaces in this structure is inconsistent, its relationship to its site, separation of living from service spaces, and deep window recesses echo of what would become his stark, strong, towering style. His designs tend to include a strong sense of geometry, often being based on very simple shapes, yet creating unique volumes of space. His buildings are often made of brick, yet his use of material is wide, varied, and often unique.

His trademark style can be seen widely in Switzerland, particularly the Ticino region and also in the Mediatheque in Villeurbanne (1988), a cathedral in Évry (1995), and the San Francisco Museum of Modern Art or SFMOMA (1994). He also designed the Europa-Park Dome, which houses many major events at the Europa-Park theme park resort in Germany. Religious works by Botta, including the Cymbalista Synagogue and Jewish Heritage Center were shown in London at the Royal Institute of British Architects in an exhibition entitled, Architetture del Sacro: Prayers in Stone. "A church is the place, par excellence, of architecture", he said in an interview with architectural historian Judith Dupré. "When you enter a church, you already are part of what has transpired and will transpire there. The church is a house that puts a believer in a dimension where he or she is the protagonist. The sacred directly lives in the collective. Man becomes a participant in a church, even if he never says anything."

In 1998, he designed the new bus station for Vimercate (near Milan), a red brick building linked to many facilities, underlining the city's recent development. He worked at La Scala's theatre renovation, which proved controversial as preservationists feared that historic details would be lost.

In 2004, he designed Museum One (M1) of the Leeum, Samsung Museum of Art in Seoul, South Korea. On 1 January 2006 he received the Grand Officer award from President of the Italian Republic Carlo Azeglio Ciampi. In 2006, he designed his first-ever spa, the Bergoase Spa in Arosa, Switzerland. The spa opened in December 2006 and cost an estimated CHF 35 million. Mario Botta participated in the Stock Exchange of Visions project in 2007. He was a member of the Jury of the Global Holcim Awards in 2012. In 2014, he was awarded with the Prize Javier Carvajal by the Universidad de Navarra.

One of Botta's less-known works is the NBG Insurance Headquarters complex in Athens, Greece, completed in 2006, which represents a collaboration with Rena Sakellaridou and Morfo Papanikolaou of SPARCH architecture. The office complex features two solid forms arranged around a public square, facilitating views of the nearby Acropolis, and an atrium filled with glass skywalks. The project, which lies substantially underground so as to minimize the impact on the urban fabric, emphasizes movement and light by transforming masses into voids. Sakellaridou highlights that the project is typical of Botta's style in its symmetry, geometry, and solid form. The collaboration of Botta and Sakellaridou is notable in that the latter paid tribute to the former in her book Mario Botta: Architectural Poetics; regarding his design oeuvre, she writes: "Botta continuously invents what is a strong possibility in the vast universe of unrealized architectural probability."

== Architectural style ==
Mario Botta has been heavily influenced by the Modern architecture movement, specifically the three Modernist architects Botta has worked under: Louis Kahn, Carlo Scarpa and Le Corbusier. Botta does not place himself in the Modernist movement, but rather he is responding to it. His architecture is tied very closely with nature, and is very simple. Botta believes that architecture is a basic need for man, and therefore creates buildings that symbolize simplicity and the essentials. About his own work, he says "it is an architecture which is measured by the yardstick of a man's needs."

Mario Botta's style is in part defined by his clients needs. Most of his early work was planned and constructed under a tight budget, so use of low cost materials, such as exposed concrete blocks, was necessary. To Botta, material cost does not influence or define his style, as good architecture is made regardless of the medium or material. Botta also believes that architecture is the formal expression of history; and his job as an architect, to some degree, is to give validity to low budget materials through thoughtful expression.

== Gallery ==
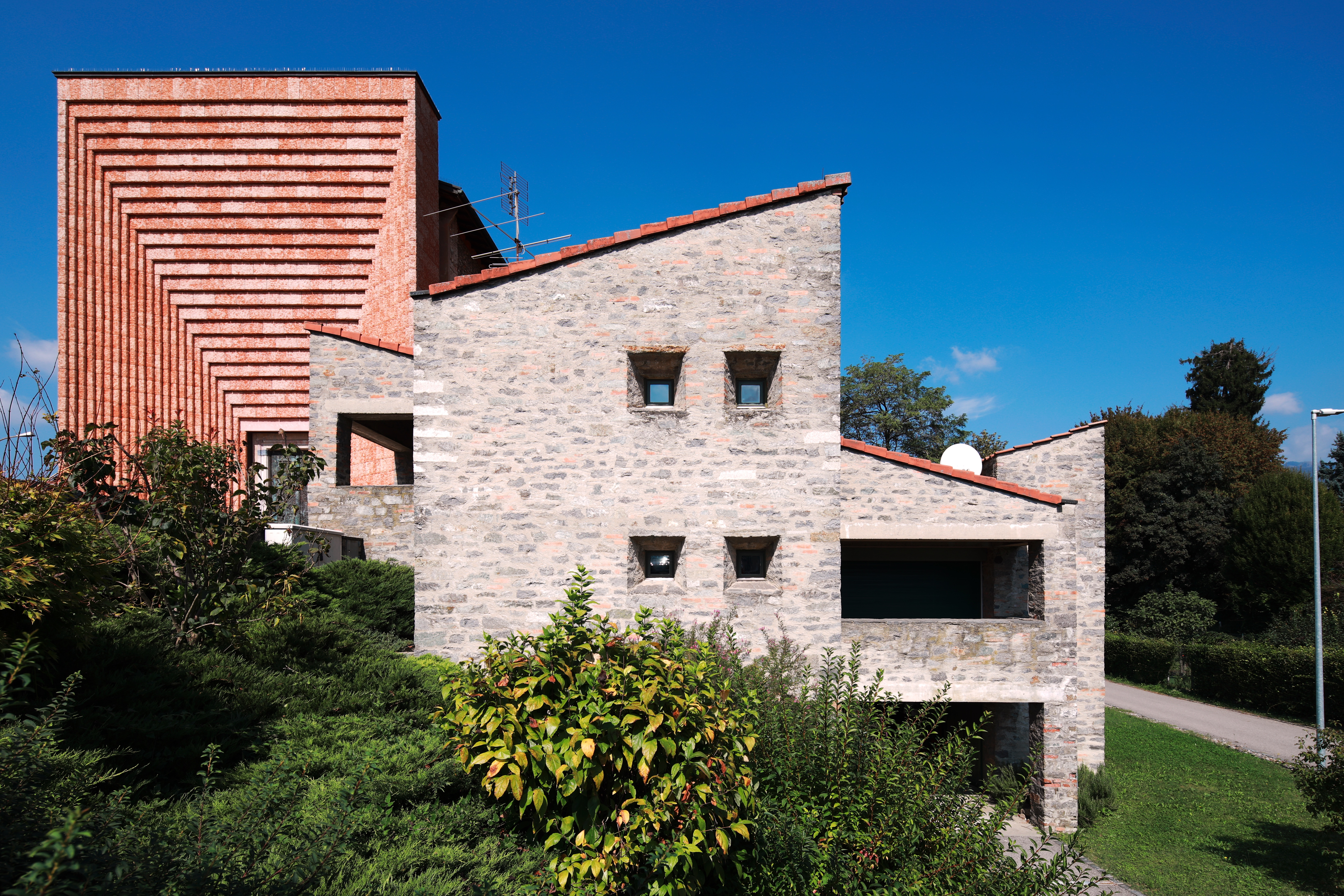
First construction of Mario Botta 1961–1963. Parish house in Genestrerio

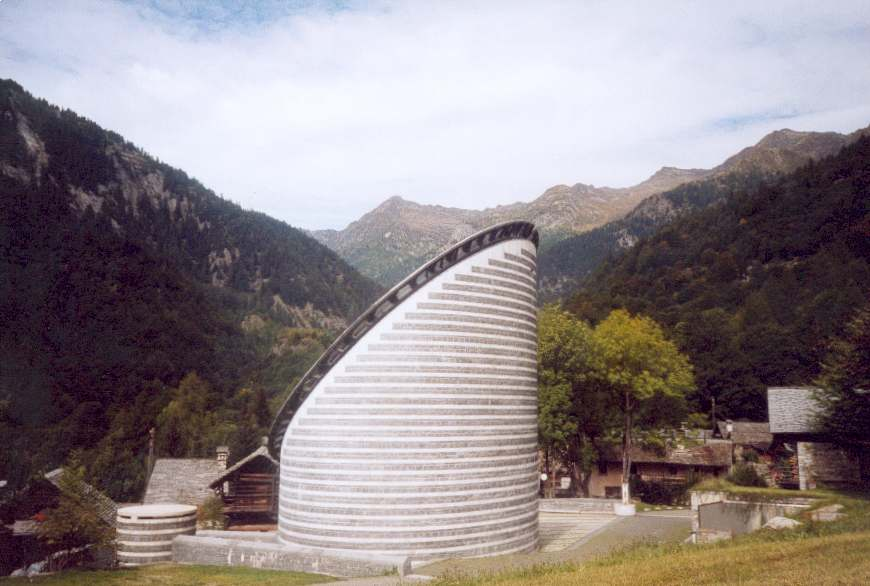
Church of St. John the Baptist in the Swiss town of Mogno

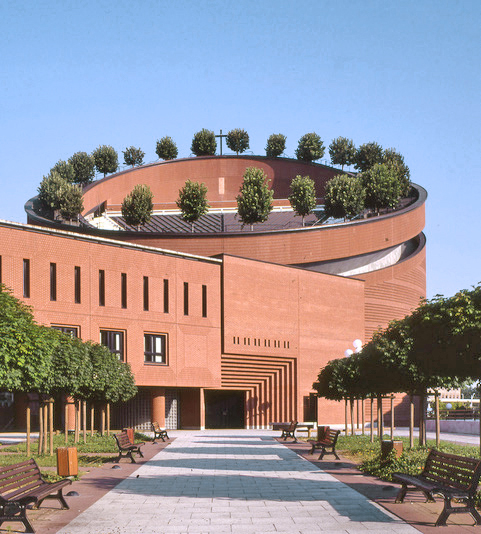
Évry Cathedral in Évry, France

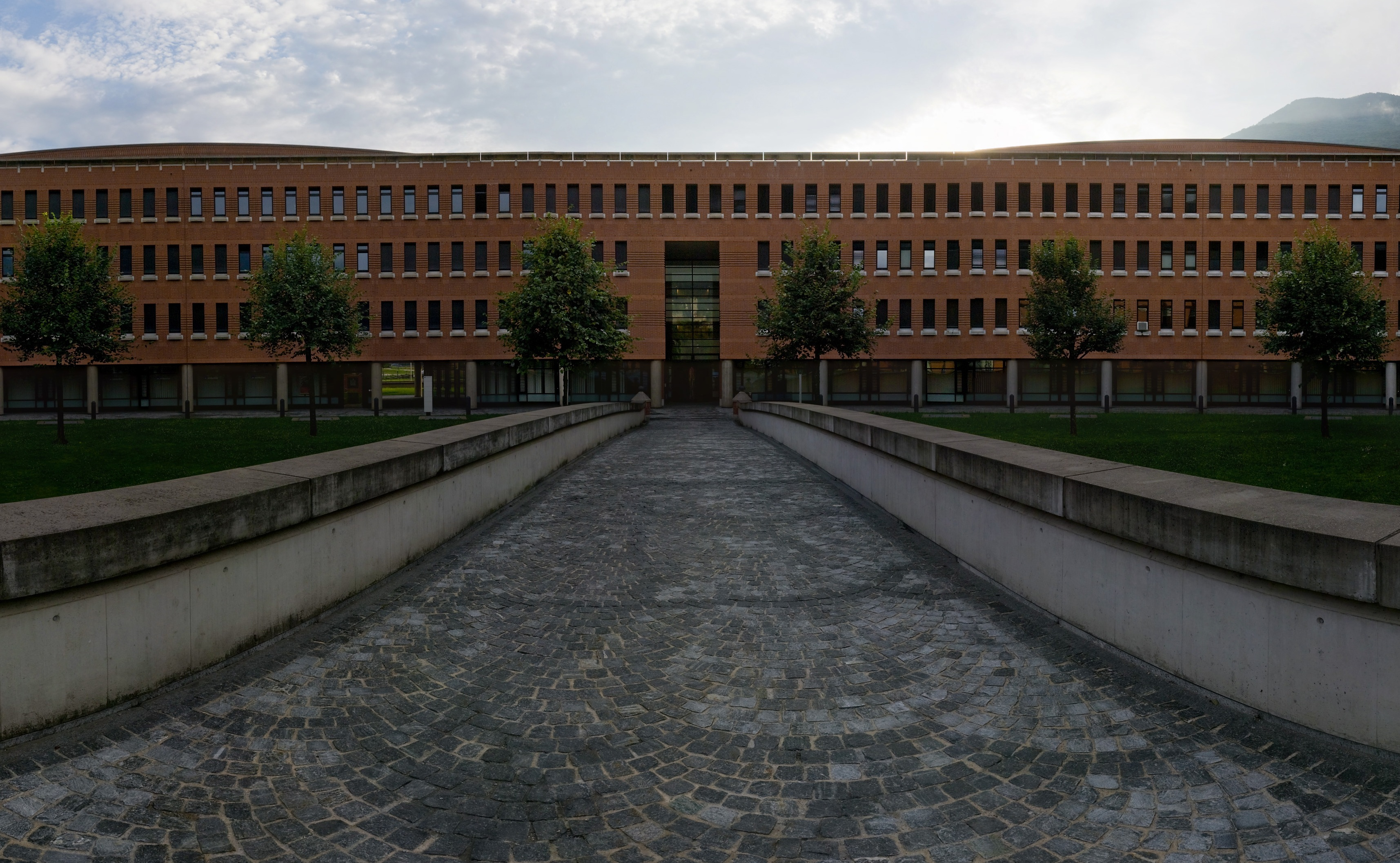
Swisscom telecommunication headquarters in Bellinzona

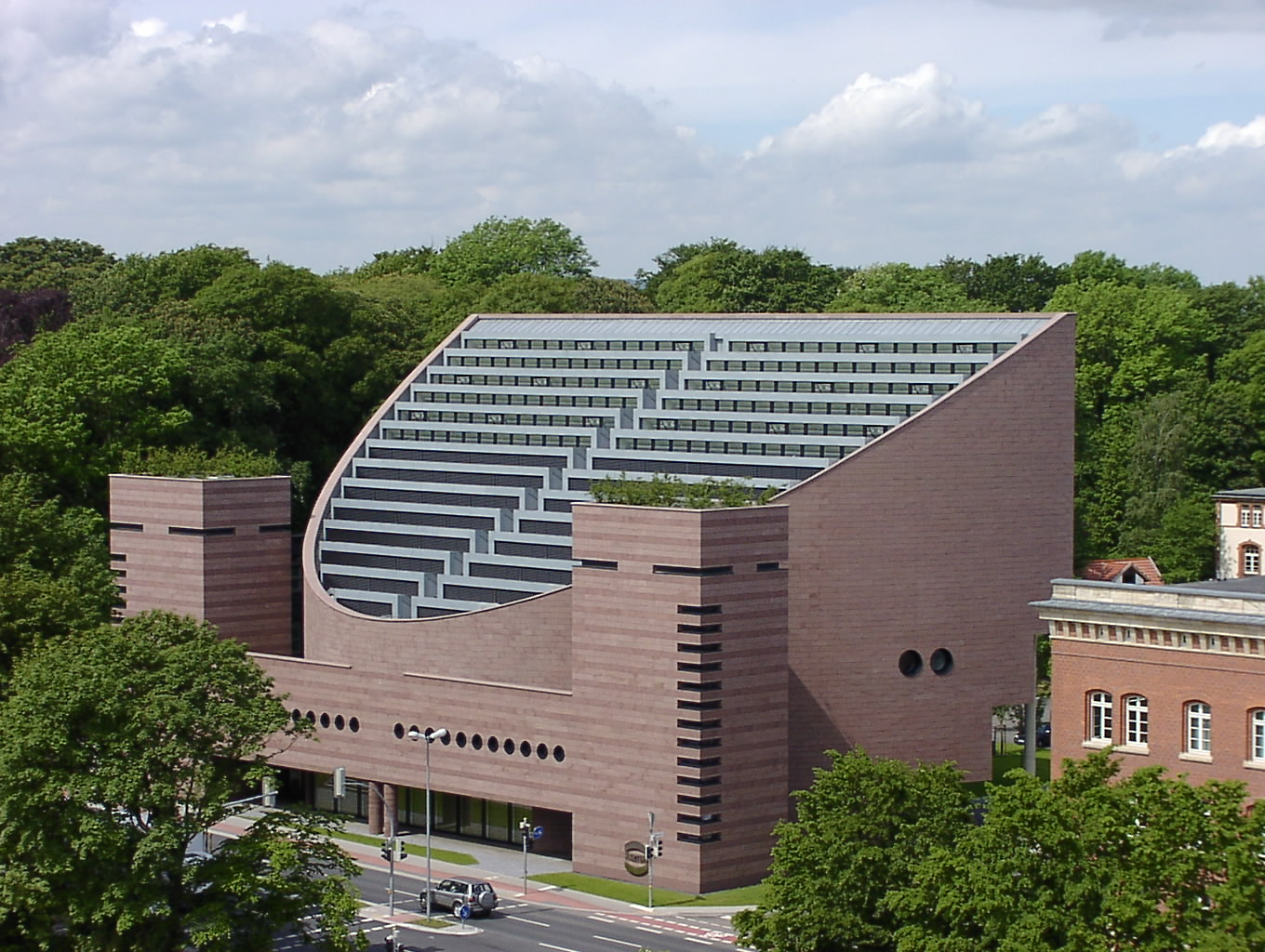
Harting Technologiegruppe headquarters in Minden

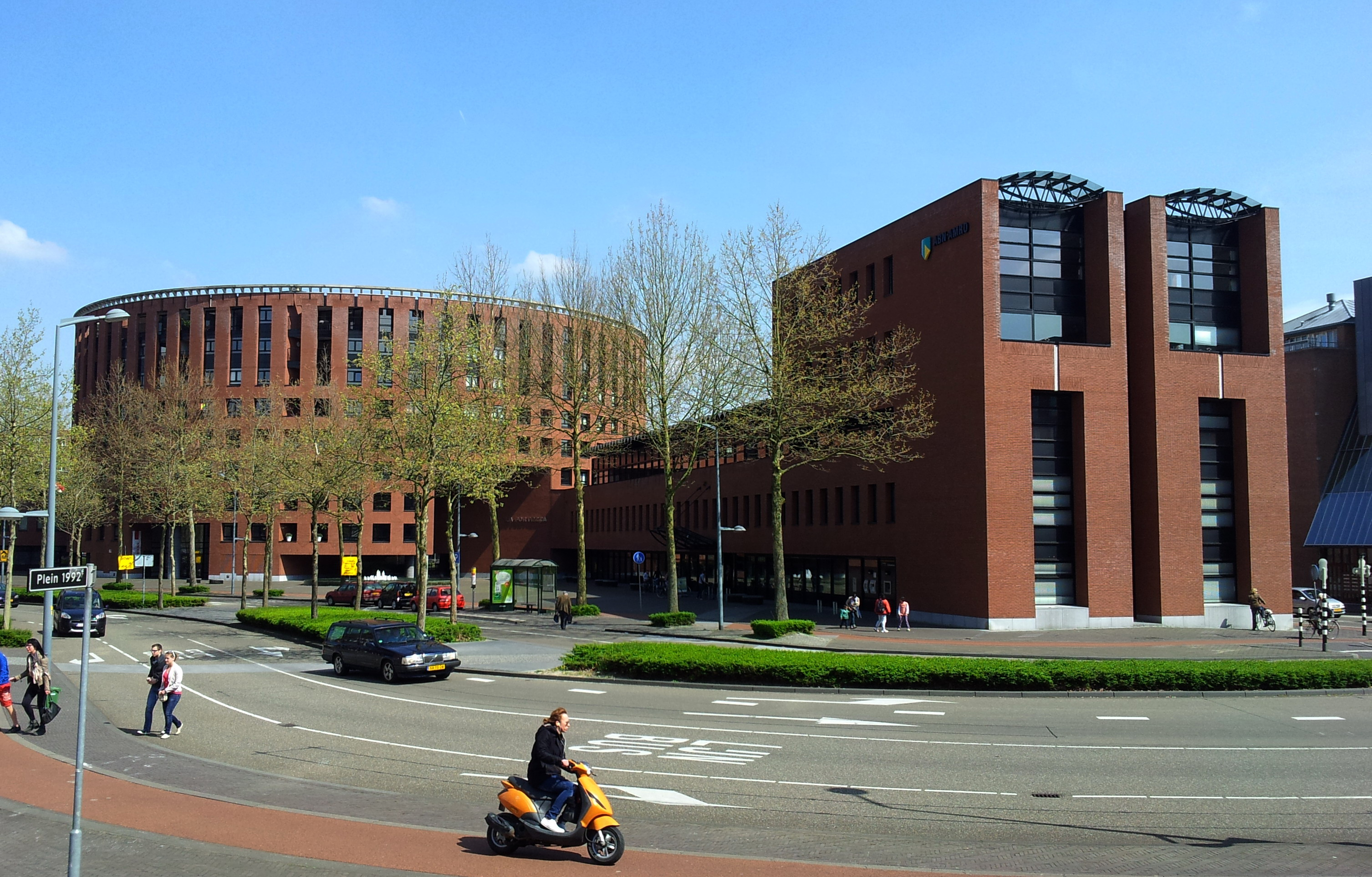
La Fortezza building, Maastricht, the Netherlands

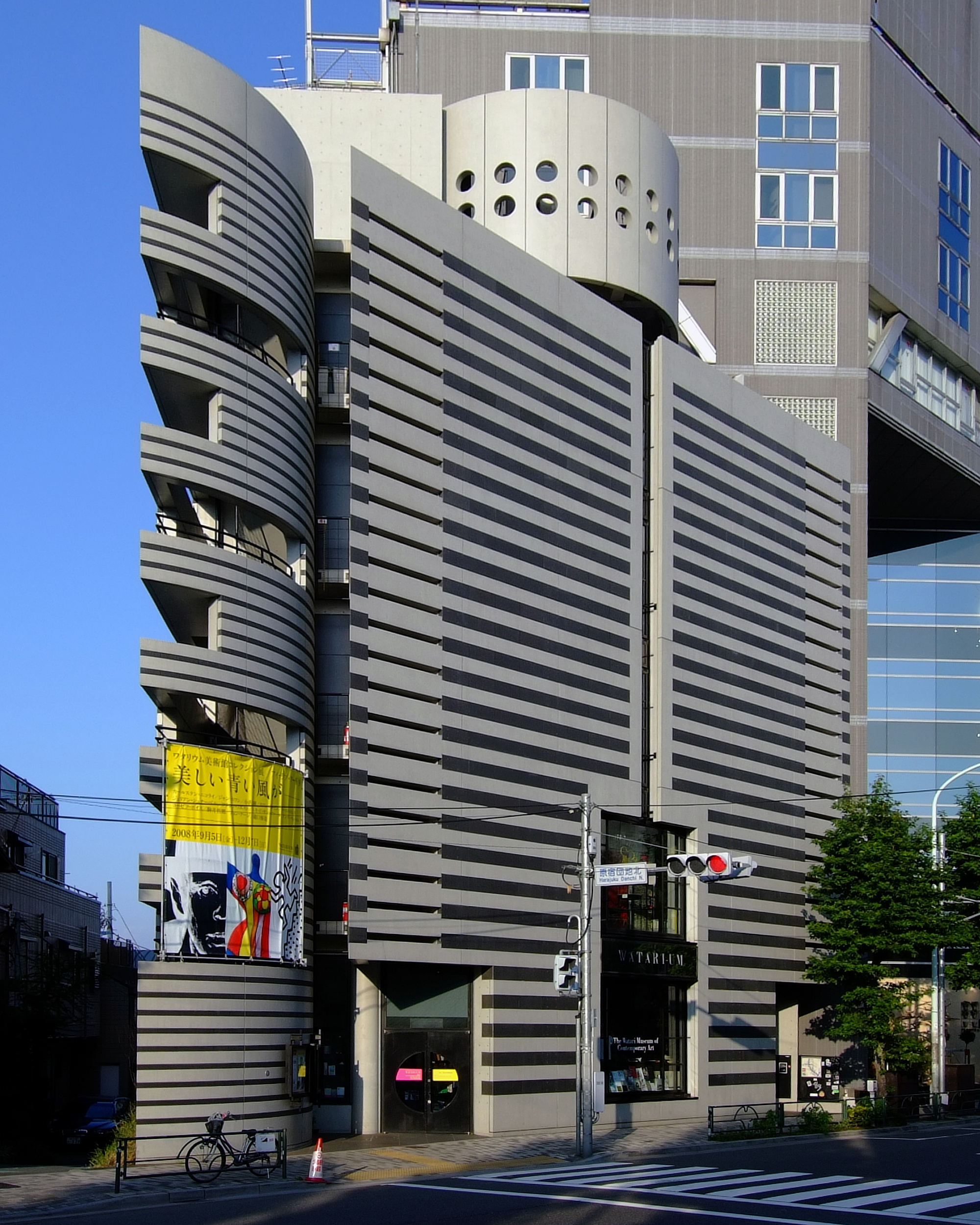
Watari Museum of Contemporary Art in Shibuya-ku, Tokyo, Japan

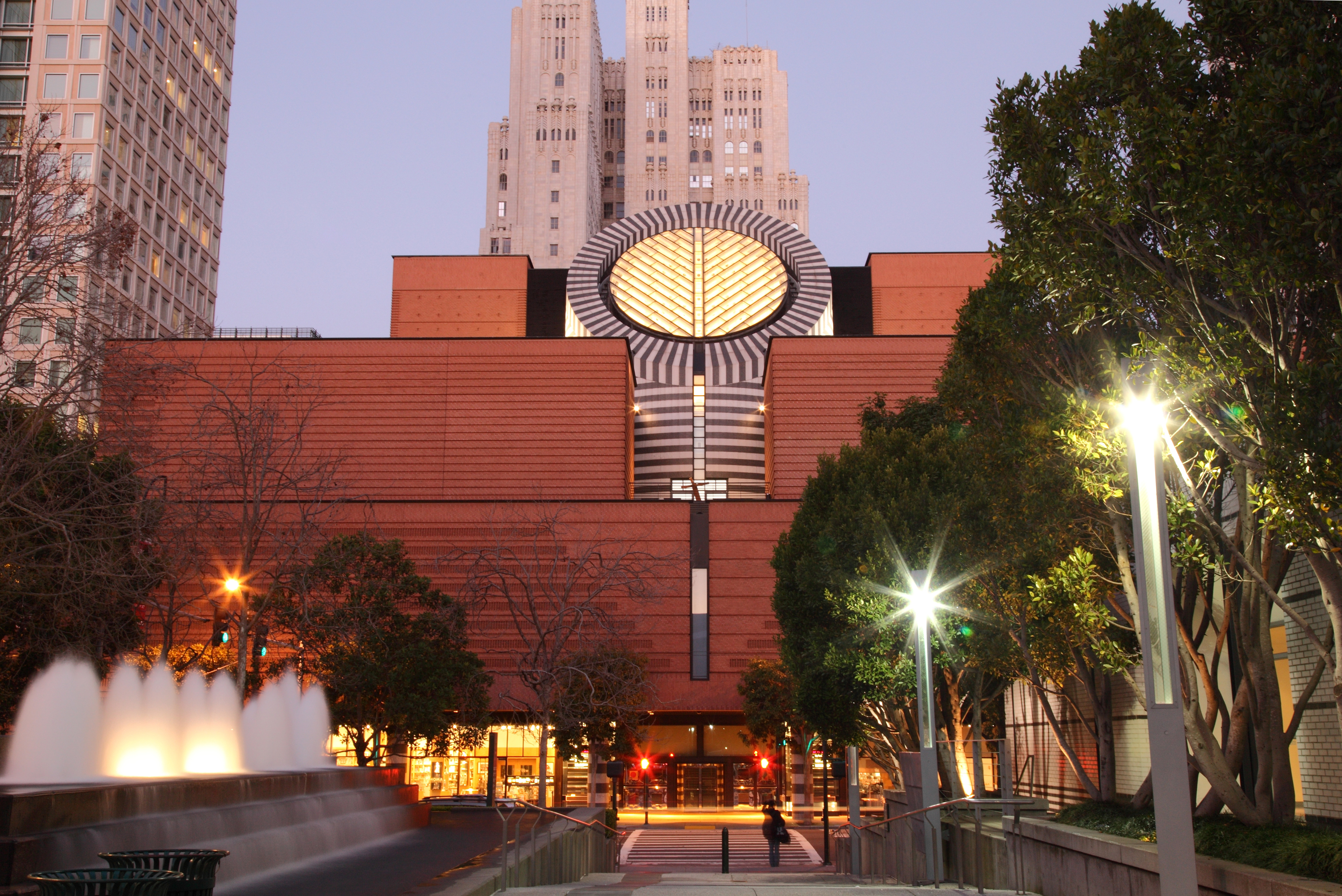
San Francisco Museum of Modern Art in San Francisco

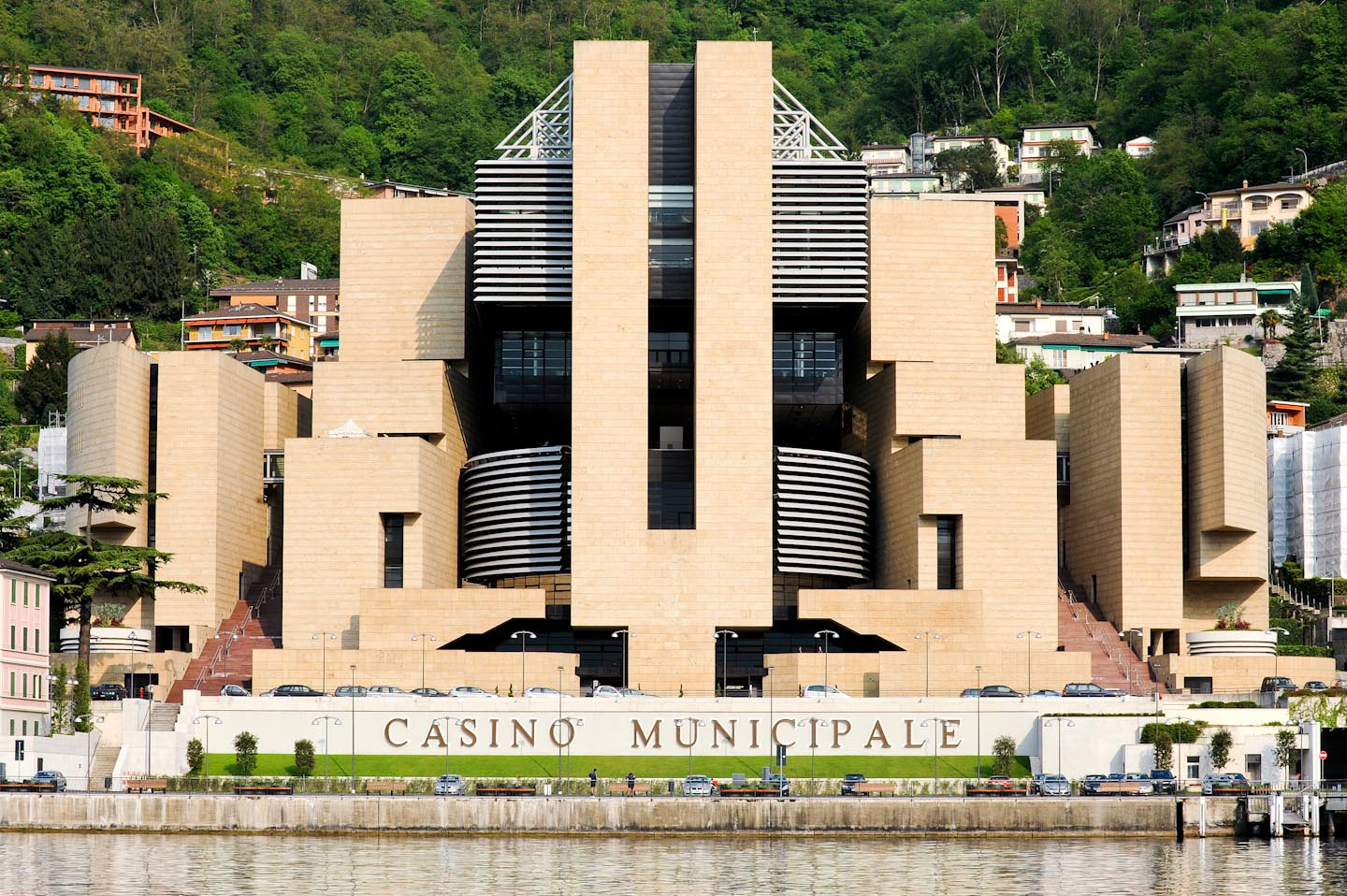
Casinò di Campione in Campione d'Italia

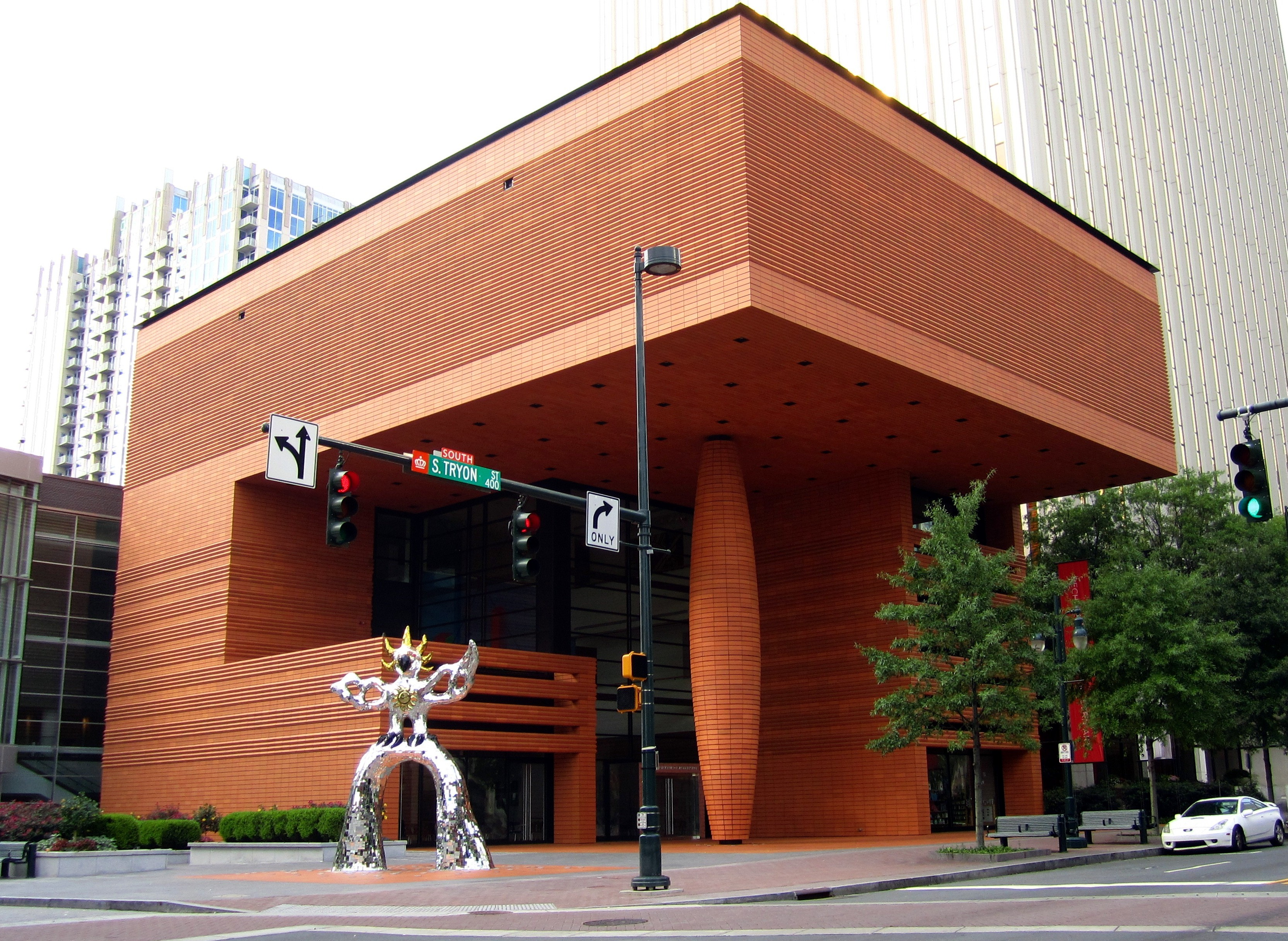
Bechtler Museum of Modern Art in Charlotte, North Carolina

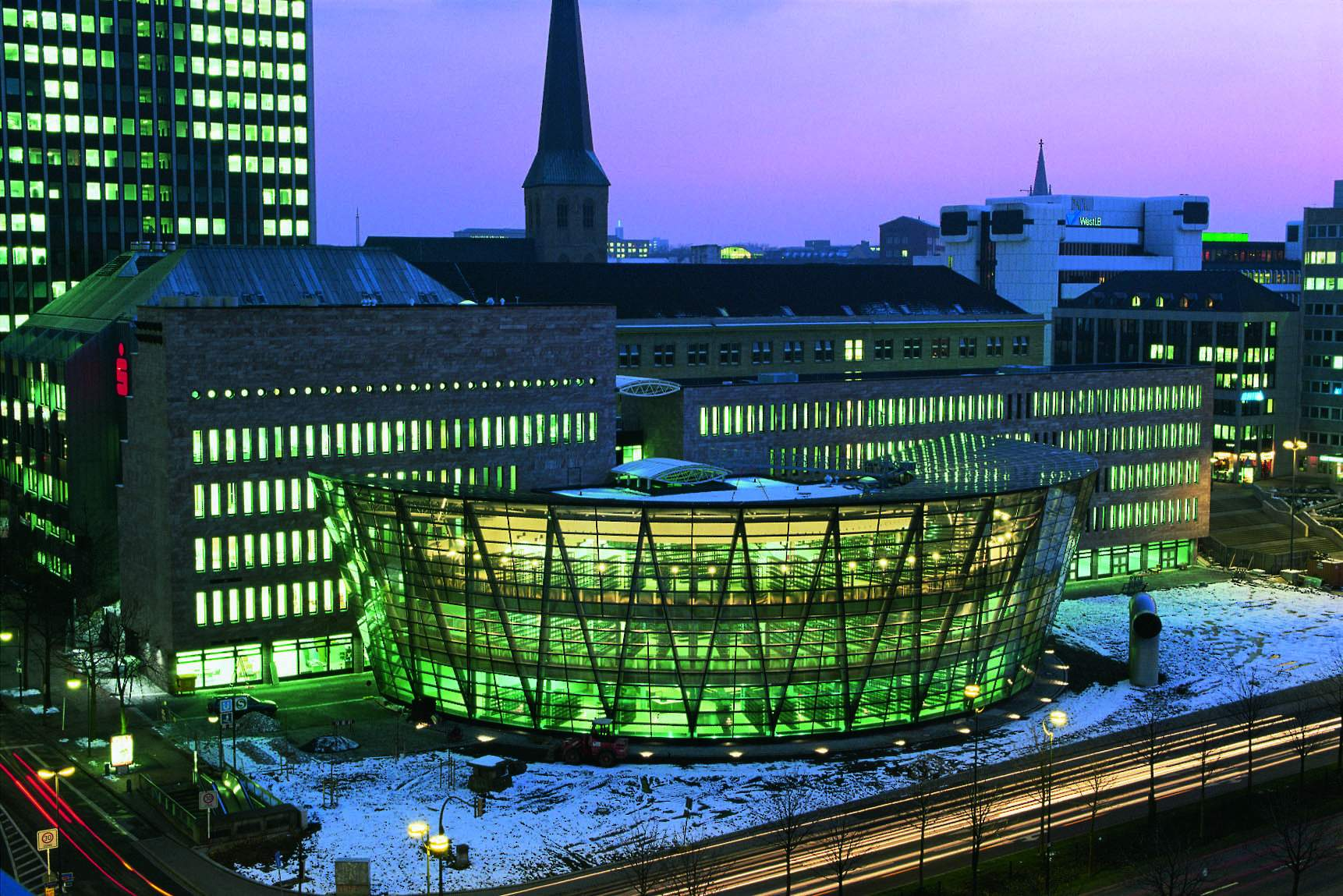
Stadt- und Landesbibliothek (Central library) in Dortmund

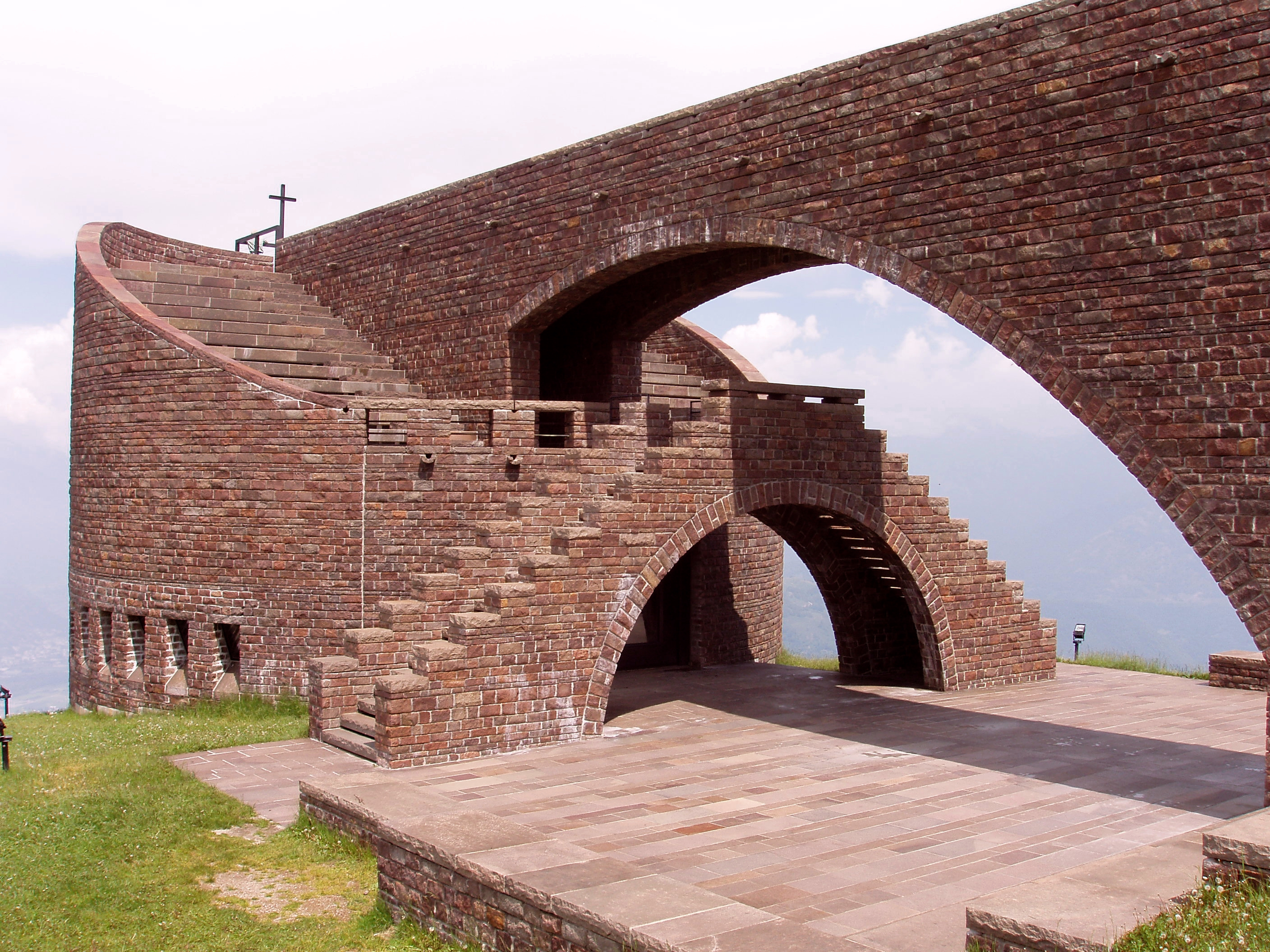
Chiesa di Santa Maria degli Angeli on Monte Tamaro

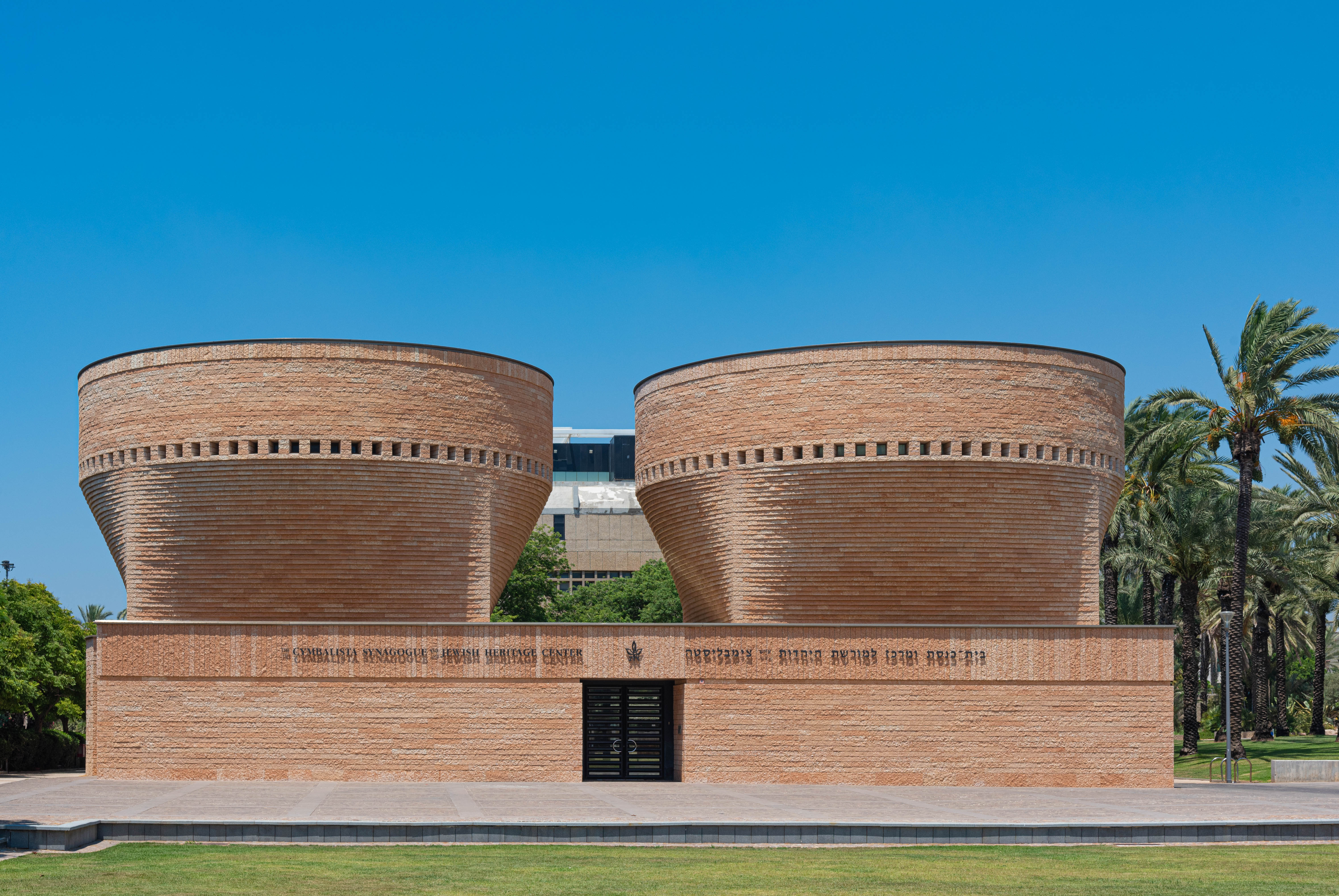
Cymbalista Synagogue and Jewish Heritage Center in Tel Aviv, Israel

== Sources ==
- Markus Breitschmid (ed.), Architecture and the Ambient – Mario Botta. Architectura et Ars Series, Volume 2, Virginia Tech Architecture Publications, 2013. ISBN 978-0-9893936-5-2
