= Museum Tower (Charlotte) =

Museum Tower Charlotte
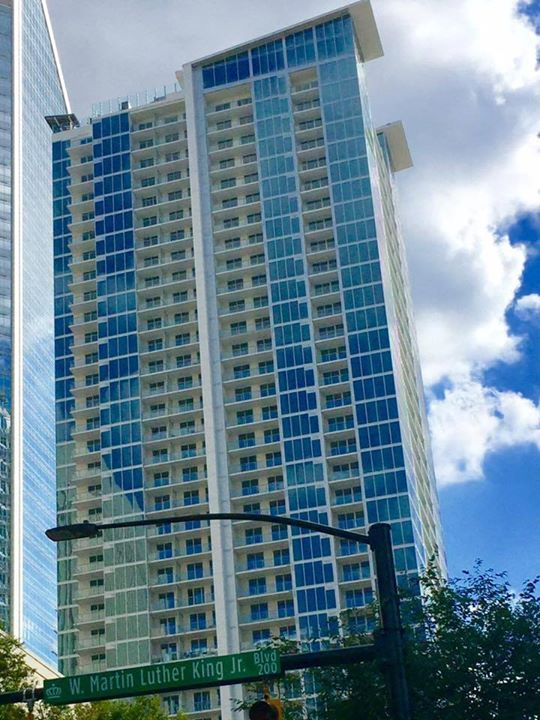
- Interactive map of the Museum Tower Charlotte area

General information
- Status: Completed
- Type: Residential
- Location: 525 South Church Street, Charlotte, NC 28202, United States
- Coordinates: 35.224757°N 80.848719°W
- Groundbreaking: May 1, 2015
- Completed: June 14, 2017
- Opened: June 16, 2017
- Cost: over $150 million

Height
- Roof: 447 ft (136 m)

Technical details
- Floor count: 42 Floors
- Floor area: 394 units
- Lifts/elevators: 42

Design and construction
- Architects: Rule, Joy, Trammell + Rubio
- Developer: Childress Klein

Website
- museumtowerapts.com

Museum Tower Charlotte is a 42-story apartment building in Uptown Charlotte, North Carolina. The building is 447 feet tall and includes 394 units.

Construction began on May 1, 2015. Museum Tower is the 5th residential building to begin construction in Uptown Charlotte since the end of the Great Recession.

Museum Tower Charlotte was constructed over the Mint Museum Charlotte. It opened on June 16, 2017, 7 years after the opening of the Duke Energy Center next door.

Museum Tower offers 1-2 bedroom rentals starting at $1861/month.
