= Ann Tanksley =

American artist

Ann Graves Tanksley (born 1934) is an American artist. Her mediums are representational oils, watercolor and printmaking. One of her most noteworthy bodies of work is a collection based on the writings of African-American novelist and anthropologist Zora Neale Hurston. The Hurston exhibition is a two hundred plus piece collection of monotypes and paintings. It toured the United States on and off from 1991 through 2010.

== Life ==
Ann Graves Tanksley was born on January 25, 1934, to Marion B. Graves and Gertrude DiuGuid Graves. She was raised in the Homewood community in Pittsburgh, Pennsylvania. She was drawn to art at an early age. She credits the actions of a kindergarten teacher as her introduction to art. In order to relax her separation anxiety from her mother on the first day of school, the teacher gave Tanksley crayons and beads. Tanksley said the items comforted her and launched the beginning of her artistic expression. Tanksley graduated from South Hills High School in 1952 and from Carnegie Institute of Technology (now Carnegie Mellon University) in 1956 with a Bachelor of Fine Arts degree.

== Career ==
Following graduation from college she married fellow Homewood native John Tanksley and they moved to Brooklyn, New York. He worked as a photo re-toucher in the advertising industry. Tanksley decided to focus on raising her daughters before pursuing painting full time. In the interim before launching her career as a full-time artist, she worked in arts education. She was an art instructor at Queens Youth Center for the Arts from 1959 – 1962, the Arts Center of Northern New Jersey, 1963 and substitute instructor of art at Malvern Public Schools in 1971. She also served as an adjunct art instructor at Suffolk County Community College from 1973 to 1975. She was also the Vice President of John Tanksley Studios, Inc.

Throughout her early career she continued her education and development as an artist by pursuing studies at several programs, including the Arts League of New York and the New School for Social Research, now known as The New School. She also studied at the Paulette Singer Workshop in Great Neck, New York, and the Robert Blackburn Printmaking Workshop, where she learned the monotype printmaking technique, prominent in the Zora Neale Hurston works. In addition to Blackburn and Singer, Tanksley also studied with several renowned artists throughout her career, including Norman Lewis (artist), Balcomb Greene and Samuel Rosenberg (artist).

Tanksley was one of the first members of Where We At: Black Women Artists, Inc., a New York-based women's art collective. The organization was founded by artists Kay Brown, Dindga McCannon, Faith Ringgold, and others associated with the Black Arts Movement. One of Tanksley's early group exhibits was the collectives 1972 show, “Cooking and Smokin”, held at Weusi-Nyumba Ya Sanaa Gallery in Harlem, NY. Where We At: Black Women Artists and other arts groups of the era, like the Ad Hoc Women's Art Committee, sponsored exhibits, education and community initiatives to draw attention to the underrepresentation of women of color artists in the Black Arts Movement, in major galleries and museums.

=== Zora Neale Hurston ===
Tanksley exhibited as early as the late 1960s, but her work began to garner critical acclaim and greater recognition in the 1980s and 1990s. A career turning point was her creation of a large body of work based on the writings of Zora Neale Hurston. The work traveled throughout the United States in the 1990s and the first decade of the 21st century.

She was introduced to Hurston during the 1980s upon discovering amongst her daughter's belongings a copy of Hurston's book, Their Eyes Were Watching God. She read the book and was so inspired by it that she read many of Hurston's other works. Tanksley “immediately fell in love with her writing,” she said in a 1996 New York Times interview. “Her material is all so visual that I feel we have much in common in interests, as well as in being African-American artists.”

Her interest in Hurston led to a collaboration on Zora: A Psychoanalytic and Artistic Interpretation of the Life and Works of Zora Neale Hurston, by psychoanalyst Dr. Hugh F. Butts. Although the book was never published, Tanksley ultimately created more than 200 paintings and black-and-white monotypes based on Hurston's writings.

In an interview about her 1993 exhibition, “Zora Neale Hurston as Muse: Art of Ann Tanksley” at the Maitland Art Center in Maitland, Florida, Tanksley suggested Hurston was both a “Spiritual Sister” and muse. She is quoted saying, “I felt connected to her in so many ways. She came to New York from Florida, I came from Pittsburgh, both of us to make our way as artists.”

== Artistic style and inspiration ==
In his book, The Art of Black American Women: Works of Twenty-Four Artists of the Century, Robert Henke describes Tanksley's work as follows: “Her work reflects the influence of her travels, the residential colors, the simple work habits, the loneliness, and the love and devotion to one’s spiritual beliefs. There is a oneness of artist and concept. Her love of life despite social barriers and frustrations is promoted in her work for audiences to witness and accept, for there is little to reject in Tanksley’s world of art. Her paintings evoke a spiritual awakening. One is drawn to the intensity of color that prevails and identifies the moods of feasts and celebrations. Where muted colors appear, there also appears the brightness of the future. Life is full of anticipation and dedication, of acceptance and hope, of faith and survival. These are all present in the works of Ann Tanksley.”

The Educator’s Guide to the Hewitt Collection of African American describes Tanksley as having "a sensitive eye for form and style. She has studied French and Caribbean art as well as the work of other African American artists. She utilizes color, line, and perspective to create a dramatic image that underscores content. Her graphic style incorporates flat areas of intense color that emphasize line and form, prompting comparisons to the work of Paul Gauguin and Henri Matisse. Tanksley's loose brushwork adds vigor and energy to her compositions."

Stylistically, Tanksley employs a representational style which she modifies with expressionistic and decorative overtones. Her work discusses the concept of emotional idealism through bold, expansive, and distinct imagery. The artist utilizes techniques such as glazing alongside rapid and masterfully executed lines of charcoal. These techniques alongside each other create a sense of free expression. Thematically, the artist is governed by her personal responses to the objects and the world around her.

== Other work ==
Tanksley has illustrated several books, including The Six Fools by Zora Neale Hurston and adapted by Joyce Carol Thomas (HarperCollins, 2006), and My Heart Will Not Sit Down by Mara Rockliff (Knopf Books for Young Readers, 2012).

Her work is in the permanent collections of the Studio Museum in Harlem in New York, the National Museum of Women in the Arts in Washington, D.C., and Medgar Evers College, in Brooklyn, NY. She is also in prominent private collections, including the John and Vivian Hewitt Collection and Oprah Winfrey's collection.

=== Selected solo exhibitions ===
- Acts of Art Gallery, New York, New York, 1973,1974.
- Spectrum II, Mount Vernon, New York, 1982.
- Dorsey Gallery, Brooklyn, New York, 1986.
- Berkeley Repertory Theater, Berkeley, California, 1991.
- California College of Arts and Crafts, Oakland, California, 1991..
- SOHO20, New York, New York, 1993.
- Eatonville Museum, Eatonville, Florida, 1994.
- Maitland Center, Maitland, Florida, 1994.
- Stella Jones Gallery, New Orleans, Louisiana, 1997.
- Virginia Commonwealth University School of the Arts in Qatar, 2004.
- Avisca Fine Art Gallery, Marietta, Ga, 2009.

=== Selected group exhibitions ===
- Acts of Art, New York, New York, 1971.
- University of Maryland, College Park, Maryland, 1981.
- American Women in Art, Nairobi, Kenya, 1985.
- Museum of African American Art, Los Angeles, California, 1992.
- National Arts Club, New York, New York, 1994.
- Kansas City Jazz Museum, Kansas City, Missouri, 1999.
- Hewitt Collection of African-American Art, Charlotte, North Carolina, 1999.
- Stamford Center for the Arts, Stamford, Connecticut, 2000.
- Connecticut Graphics Arts Center, Norwalk, Connecticut, 2001.
- August Wilson Center for African American Culture, Pittsburgh, PA, 2017.
- 73 See Gallery, Montclair, New Jersey, 2019.

=== Published Works ===
- The Six Fools by Zora Neale Hurston and adapted by Joyce Carol Thomas (HarperCollins, 2006)
- My Heart Will Not Sit Down by Mara Rockliff (Knopf Books for Young Readers, 2012).

Among the anthologies and publications in which the artist and her work have been featured are:

- The Art of Black American Women: Works of Twenty Four Artists of the Twentieth Century by Robert Henkes;
- Gumbo Ya Ya: Anthology of Contemporary African-American Women Artists by Leslie King-Hammond;
- Time Capsule: A Concise Encyclopedia of Women Artists by Robin Kahn;
- Forever Free: Art by African-American Women and Jewels: 50 Phenomenal Black Women Over Fifty by Michael Cunningham and Connie Briscoe.
