= Wachovia (disambiguation) =

Wachovia is a bank and a subsidiary of Wells Fargo.

Wachovia or Wachovia Building may also refer to:

== Locations ==
- Wachovia, North Carolina, an area in Forsyth County, North Carolina
- the Latin name for the Wachau in Austria

== Buildings ==
- Wachovia Tower (Birmingham), an office building in Birmingham, Alabama
- Wachovia Building (Mobile), Alabama
- Wachovia Tower (Jacksonville), now One Enterprise Center, in Jacksonville, Florida
- Wachovia Financial Center, previous name of a skyscraper in Miami, Florida
- Wachovia Bank of Georgia, a skyscraper in Atlanta, Georgia
- Wachovia Tower (Baltimore), Maryland, now known as Wells Fargo Tower
- One Wachovia Center, in Charlotte, North Carolina, now known as One Wells Fargo Center
- Two Wachovia Center, in Charlotte, now known as Two Wells Fargo Center
- Three Wachovia Center, in Charlotte, now known as Three Wells Fargo Center
- Wachovia Center (Winston-Salem), in Winston-Salem, North Carolina, now known as 100 North Main Street
- Wachovia Building (Winston-Salem), in Winston-Salem, North Carolina, now known as Winston Tower, listed on the NRHP
- Wachovia Bank and Trust Company Building, Winston-Salem, North Carolina, listed on the NRHP
- Wachovia Building (Philadelphia), a skyscraper in Philadelphia, Pennsylvania
- Wachovia Corporate Center, pre-construction name of 550 South Tryon in Charlotte, North Carolina

== Sports Arenas ==
- Wachovia Arena at Casey Plaza, 8,300-seat multi-purpose arena located in Wilkes-Barre, Pennsylvania
- Wachovia Center, indoor arena located in Philadelphia, Pennsylvania
- Wachovia Spectrum, indoor arena that was replaced by the Wachovia Center

== Other ==
- Wachovia Championship, PGA Golf Tournament
- Wachovia Securities, brokerage division of Wachovia
