= 550 South Tryon =

Office skyscraper

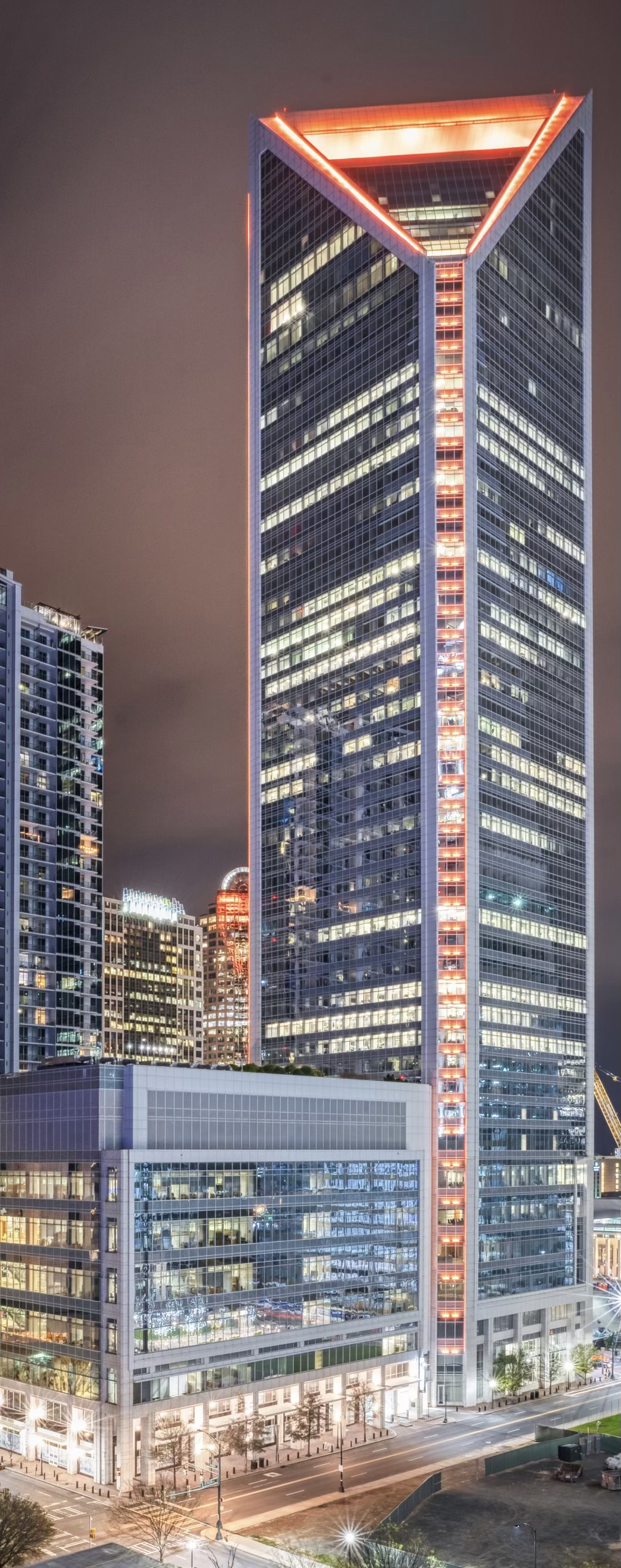
- Former names: Duke Energy Center

General information
- Status: Completed
- Type: Office building
- Location: 550 South Tryon Street; Charlotte, NC
- Coordinates: 35°13′26.48″N 80°50′53.28″W
- Construction started: February 28, 2006
- Opening: January 2010; 16 years ago
- Cost: $880 million
- Owner: Wells Fargo

Height
- Roof: 786 feet (240 m)

Technical details
- Floor count: 48 floors (54 in total with mechanical floors)
- Floor area: 1,370,214 square feet (127,297.0 m^{2})

Design and construction
- Architect: tvsdesign
- Structural engineer: TRC Worldwide Engineering, Inc.
- Main contractor: Batson-Cook Company subcontractors: Boda Plumbing, Inc.; J Davis Contracting Juba Aluminum Products Co., Inc.

Other information
- Public transit: Brooklyn Village

Website
- www.childressklein.com/550-s-tryon

550 South Tryon (formerly the Duke Energy Center) is a 786-foot (240 m) tall, 48-floor (54 floors including mechanical floors) skyscraper in Charlotte, North Carolina.

When completed in 2010, it was the largest building in Charlotte (in square footage), second tallest building in Charlotte, 63rd tallest building in the United States, and the tallest in the world to use precast double tees.

== History ==
Duke Power chief executive Bill Lee had put together the property in the 1990s, intending to build Duke's headquarters there, but the company dropped its plans and sold the land to Wachovia.

=== Development Years ===
Originally, the building was to be known as the Wachovia Corporate Center. It was to replace One Wachovia Center as the headquarters of Wachovia. Wachovia was to occupy 450,000 square feet (42,000 m^{2}) of the 1.5 million square feet (140,000 m^{2}) tower. The first floor of the building was to contain the main lobby and elevators. The second floor was to have Wachovia's server room. The third floor would have been occupied by training areas during the day and classrooms at night. This area was to have been shared by Wachovia and Wake Forest University, which was to use it for its MBA courses. Floors four through seven were to contain the trading floor. It would have taken up 45,000 square feet (4,200 m^{2}) and housed approximately 750 traders per floor. Wachovia would also have used floors 36 through 48.

After Wells Fargo announced its purchase of Wachovia, Duke (by this time called Duke Energy) more than doubled the space it planned to use from 240,000 square feet (22,000 m^{2}) to 500,000 square feet (46,000 m^{2}) and the name changed to Duke Energy Center. In addition to the upper floors Wachovia would have used, Duke planned to use floors 15 through 22. Wells Fargo, which still owned the building, planned to occupy five of its 14 floors late in 2010. KPMG and Katten Muchin Rosenman moved into the building in February 2010, while Duke Energy moved later in 2010.

Originally law firm Sonnenschein announced it would lease 35,000 square feet (3,300 m^{2}) on the 34th and 35th floors and Deloitte leased 82,000 square feet (7,600 m^{2}) of space. After acquiring Wachovia, Wells Fargo still had reserved 400,000 square feet (37,000 m^{2}) of space. However, in September 2009 the company stated they were open to leasing out 25% of that space. At that time they were committed to using 10 floors of the building.

Prior to Wells Fargo purchasing Wachovia, Duke Energy was planning to occupy 240,000 square feet (22,000 m^{2}) of space. In February 2009, Duke announced it would occupy 500,000 square feet (46,000 m^{2}) and become the building's primary tenant. The building was rebranded as Duke Energy Center. Duke announced plans to occupy floors 15 through 22 and 36–48.

Originally, Wake Forest University had planned to locate the Charlotte campus of its Babcock Graduate School of Management in the tower, occupying approximately 25,000 square feet (2,300 m^{2}). However, Wake Forest pulled out of the project after the purchase of Wachovia by Wells Fargo.

=== Post-Completion ===
In August 2010 Commercial real estate firm Cassidy Turley announced it had signed a lease to occupy 11,000 square feet (1,000 m^{2}) on the 34th floor of the building. The firm will taking part of the 35,000 square feet (3,300 m^{2}) formerly leased by law firm Sonnenschein Nath & Rosenthal in 2008. In 2009 the law firm closed its Charlotte office.

In August 2012 Babson Capital Management announced they have signed a lease for 34,000 square feet (3,200 m^{2}) in the building on the 33rd and 34th floors. The move gave the company a 50% space increase from its former space in Charlotte Plaza. The extra space was to support the company's 49% in the last 63 years.

In November 2012 Wells Fargo started utilizing 300,000 square feet (28,000 m^{2}) for several trading floors. The new space could hold 1,500 employees spread across two trading floors. It became the bank's largest hub for the bank's investment banking and capital markets division.

Wells Fargo announced it would exit its lease at One Wells Fargo Center at the end of 2021. As of 2020 it was the largest tenant with 500,000 square feet (46,000 m^{2}). The company was consolidating its Charlotte footprint with leasing the entire 300 South Brevard building, expanding their employee space in the building following Duke's departure, and relocating additional employees in Three Wells Fargo Center.

=== 550 South Tryon ===
Duke Energy's departure left several large blocks of continuous space available, including 224,776 square feet (20,882.4 m^{2}) on floors 7 to 14, 148,469 square feet (13,793.2 m^{2}) on 15 to 21, 59,132 square feet (5,493.5 m^{2}) on 30 to 32 and 47,403 square feet (4,403.9 m^{2}) on the top floors, 40 to 42. As of December 31, 2021, Duke had exited its lease of the building. All Duke employees left the building before the holidays. The Duke Energy Center signs and plaques were removed and the building was temporarily renamed 550 South Tryon. After Wells Fargo moved into space previously occupied by Duke Energy, the company would occupy 95% of the building. The bank will be renovating 21 floors of the building and the food court. On June 15, 2025, Wells Fargo used a helicopter to place the words "Wells Fargo" on both sides of the top part of the building, known as the handlebar roof.

== Construction ==
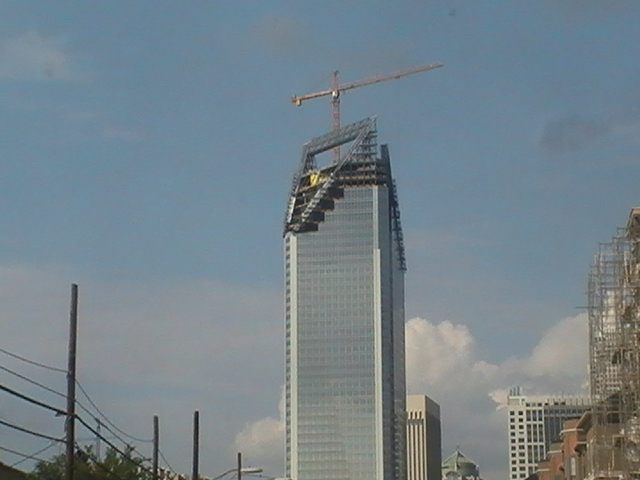
The Duke Energy Center under construction in summer 2009

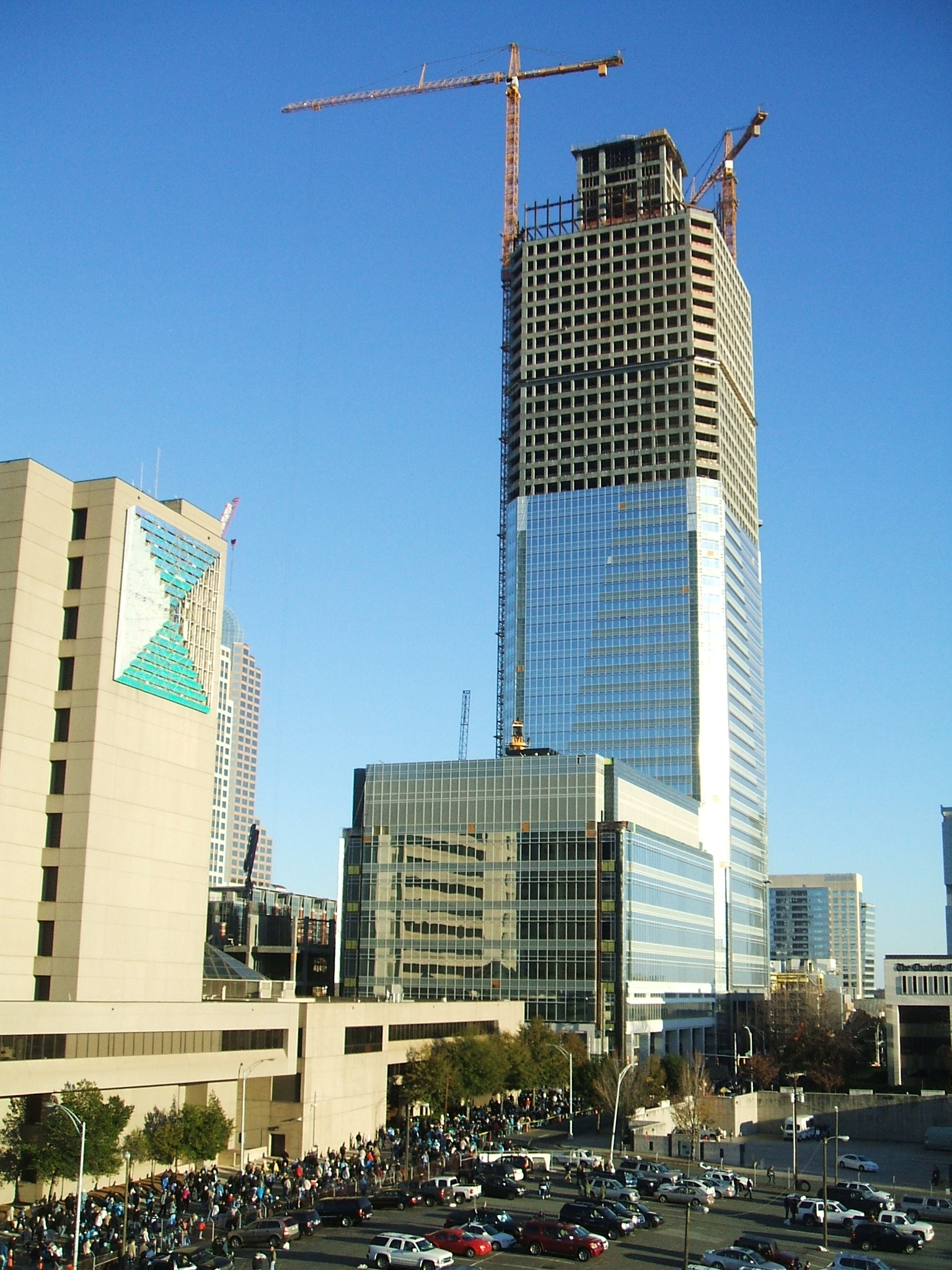
Photo taken from Bank of America Stadium (Nov. 2008)

The project was announced in the spring of 2004, and official renderings were not released until December 6, 2006. In the original petition to the Charlotte-Mecklenburg Planning Commission, the building was going to be built on a 1.29-acre (5,200 m^{2}) parcel next to 400 South Tryon, with a height of 510 feet (160 m) and 34 floors. The site preparation began with the demolition of a Firestone Tire dealership in February 2006, and on February 28, 2006, the excavation and blasting of a 100-foot (30 m)-deep hole for the below-grade parking garage began. Over 600,000 pounds (270,000 kg) of explosives were used during its excavation and it took just over 60,000 dump truck loads to remove all of the excavated material from the site, some of which was used in the construction of a third runway at Charlotte-Douglas International Airport.

The building was constructed by Batson-Cook Construction, with ready mix products from Concrete Supply Co. and structural engineering firm TRC International Ltd, of Sarasota, Florida. The building core is constructed with poured-in-place concrete while the floor structures utilize precast double tees, a structural method typically seen in parking decks. These double tees span between the poured-in-place core and perimeter systems. The concrete used for the building is 18,000 pounds per square inch (120,000 kPa).

The building received a certificate of occupancy on December 23, 2009, with the lobby and parking garage opening on January 2, 2010.

== Features ==
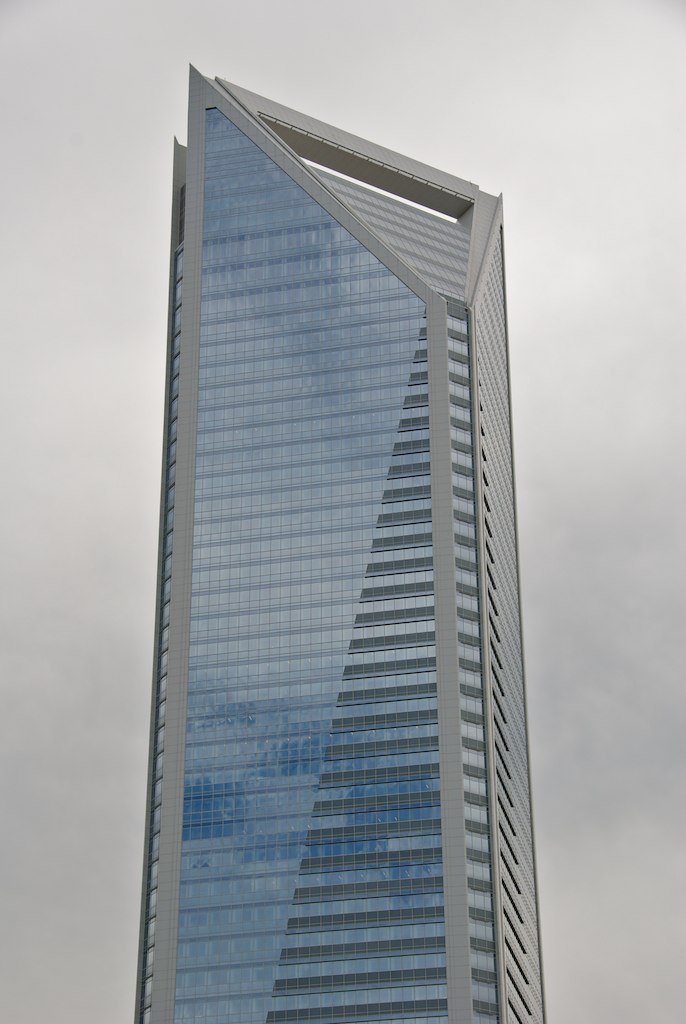
View of Duke Energy Center in October 2010, showing aperture near the top

It is the tallest building in the Levine Center for the Arts (formerly the Wells Fargo Cultural Campus) and the largest building in Charlotte, which will have a 250,000-square-foot (23,000 m^{2}) footprint. The complex will also include a 46-floor condominium tower (future), the Harvey B. Gantt Center for African-American Arts + Culture, the Mint Museum Uptown, the Knight Theater, the Bechtler Museum of Modern Art, and a History Museum. The building has achieved LEED Platinum status by including water-saving plumbing devices, a water storage system that will treat rainwater to be used for cooling tower make-up water, and a green roof. Rock that was blasted for the parking structure is being recycled by hauling it to a local quarry, where it will be crushed for gravel.

The facade of the structure is illuminated by hundreds of programmable color-changing LED and metal halide luminaires with design work by Gabler-Youngston Architectural Lighting Design. The facade lighting system provides various shows and effects. Due to the tower's high visibility over the east corner of Bank of America Stadium, the LED lights are used during key moments of sporting events played there. For example, if the Carolina Panthers are playing, the tower lights up blue for Panthers touchdowns. During the ACC Championship Game, whenever a team scores a touchdown, it lights up in that team's color.

== See also ==
- List of tallest buildings in Charlotte
- Levine Center for the Arts
- List of tallest buildings in North Carolina
- List of tallest buildings in the United States
- Duke Energy Plaza
