= Allegra Westbrooks =

American librarian

Allegra Westbrooks

Allegra Westbrooks (Mar 16, 1921 – Apr 26, 2017) was a librarian in Charlotte Mecklenburg Library and the namesake for the Allegra Westbrooks Regional Library branch. She first worked in Charlotte Mecklenburg Library's segregated library branch, the Brevard Street Library for Negroes.

When the system desegregated in 1956, Westbrooks ran the acquisitions at the main branch before being promoted to Supervisor of Branches in 1957. She was the first African American to work in the library system and the first to hold a supervisory position in a library in North Carolina.

Westbrooks established a book mobile program to encourage reading and access to reading materials particularly for African American populations. This was particularly crucial before the library system integrated. As Willie Griffin, historian from the Levine Museum of the New South explains:

She stood outside black schools because at the time, the book mobile program was not allowed to sit at local public branches of libraries in other parts of the county because they had not been integrated yet, so a black book mobile could not sit on its property.

In April 2020 the Beatties Ford Regional Library branch was renamed the Allegra Westbrooks Regional Library, the first time a branch has been named for an individual. She worked in the system for 36 years retiring in 1984. Kelly Alexander, president of the local NAACP chapter, called her "one of the most important figures in the local civil rights movement."

== Personal life ==
Westbrooks was born in Cumberland, Maryland in 1921 and grew up in Fayetteville, North Carolina. She received her library degree from Clark Atlanta University, School of Library Services. She came to Charlotte, North Carolina to work in the library system in 1947.
