= First Union =

Defunct American banking company

First Union Corporation
- Company type: Public
- Traded as: NYSE: FTU
- Industry: Banking
- Founded: June 2, 1908; 118 years ago
- Founder: H.M. Victor
- Defunct: September 4, 2001; 24 years ago
- Fate: Acquired Wachovia National Bank to become Wachovia Corporation; assuming the name of the former company
- Successor: Wells Fargo (formerly Wachovia)
- Headquarters: Charlotte, North Carolina, U.S.
- Areas served: 2,193 branches in 11 states
- Products: Financial services
- Total assets: $171 billion
- Number of employees: 71,262
- Subsidiaries: CoreStates Financial; Wachovia National Bank

First Union Corporation was an American bank holding company that provided commercial and retail banking services in eleven states in the eastern U.S. First Union also provided various other financial services, including mortgage banking, credit card, investment banking (First Union Securities), investment advisory, home equity lending, asset-based lending, leasing, insurance, international and securities brokerage services and private equity through First Union Capital Partners, and through other subsidiaries.

In September 2001, First Union completed their acquisition of Wachovia National Bank to become Wachovia Corporation, which used to be one of the largest financial holding companies in the U.S. As of the end of 2000, First Union had over $171 billion of total assets, over 70,000 employees and 2,193 branches. After their acquisition of Wachovia, they assumed the name and stock ticker symbol of the latter company.

== History ==
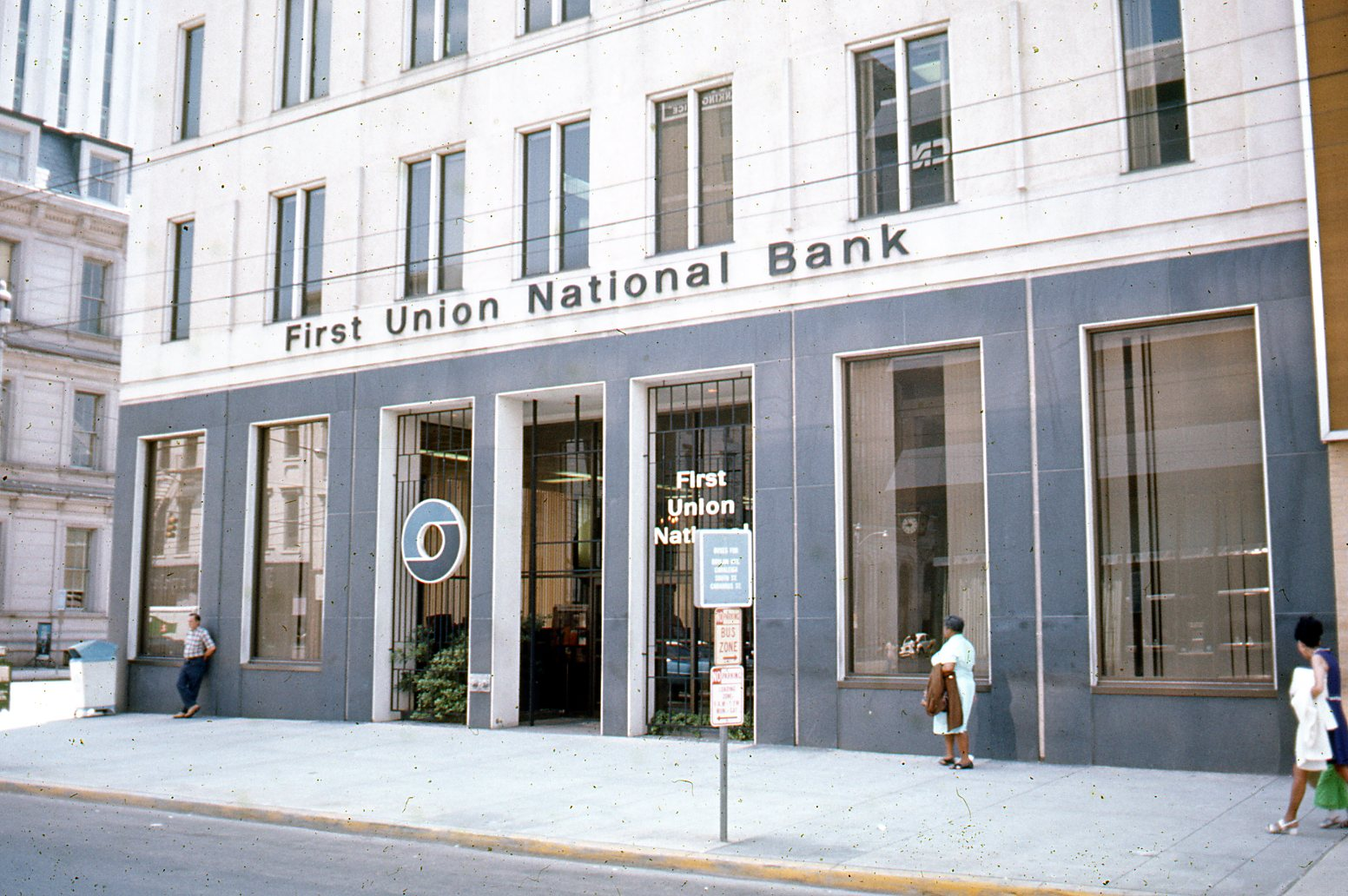
First Union National Bank in Raleigh, North Carolina, c. 1974

First Union Corporation was founded as Union National Bank on June 2, 1908, a small banking desk in the lobby of a hotel in Charlotte, North Carolina, by H. M. Victor.

The bank merged with First National Bank and Trust Company of Asheville in 1958 to become First Union National Bank of North Carolina. In 1964, the bank added Cameron-Brown company, a mortgage banking and insurance firm.

First Union Corporation was incorporated in 1967. In February 1968, Cameron-Brown Co., a $10 billion mortgage banker created in 1955 from the merger of Fidelity Bond & Mortgage Co. started in 1946 in Raleigh and Brown-Hamel Mortgage Co. of Greensboro, changed its name to First Union Mortgage Corp. to match its parent company. As part of a corporate reorganization in 1968, a predecessor of First Union National Bank and First Union Mortgage Corporation, the mortgage banking firm acquired in 1964 became subsidiaries of First Union Corp creating the structure the bank utilized until the 2001 merger.

Starting in 1985, with the Supreme Court decision upholding regional interstate banking legislation, First Union focused on an aggressive growth strategy. From 1985 through the merger with Wachovia in 2001, First Union completed over 90 banking-related acquisitions, 50 of which were completed between 1985 and 1995. Atlantic National Bank in Jacksonville, Florida, merged with First Union in 1985.

In a deal announced in June 1992, First Union acquired South Carolina Federal Corp., making First Union the third largest bank in South Carolina by deposits, but also giving North Carolina–based banks the majority of financial institution assets in South Carolina, something that had never happened in any state since regional banking began in 1986.

In 1995, First Union acquired First Fidelity of Newark, New Jersey to expand to the Northeast.

=== CoreStates ===
In April 1998, First Union acquired CoreStates Financial Corporation, headquartered in Philadelphia. At the time, this was the largest merger in U.S. banking history.

CoreStates traced its history to 1781 and the Bank of North America, the first bank chartered in the United States. Once the merger finalized, First Union claimed 1781 as its founding date. It continued to operate The Bank of North America's first branch at 6th and Chestnut streets in Philadelphia, which opened in 1782. It is now the longest continuously operated branch in the nation, and is part of Wells Fargo through multiple subsequent mergers.

The acquisition of CoreStates brought problems. Many of these arose when First Union attempted to integrate the CoreStates and First Union computer systems too rapidly. Initially, CoreStates’ tellers received insufficient training with the new First Union systems and the two systems were unable to communicate with each other. This led to problems with account access and payments not correctly applied to loans.

=== Bowles Hollowell Conner ===
First Union acquired Bowles Hollowell Conner & Co. on April 30, 1998, adding to its merger and acquisition, high yield, leveraged finance, equity underwriting, private placement, loan syndication, risk management, and public finance capabilities.

=== The Money Store ===
On June 30, 1998, First Union paid $2.1 billion for The Money Store, a specialist in home equity loans known for its commercials featuring Baseball Hall of Fame shortstop Phil Rizutto and pitcher Jim Palmer. Two years later, it closed the unit, writing off $1.7 billion in losses.

=== Acquisition of Wachovia ===
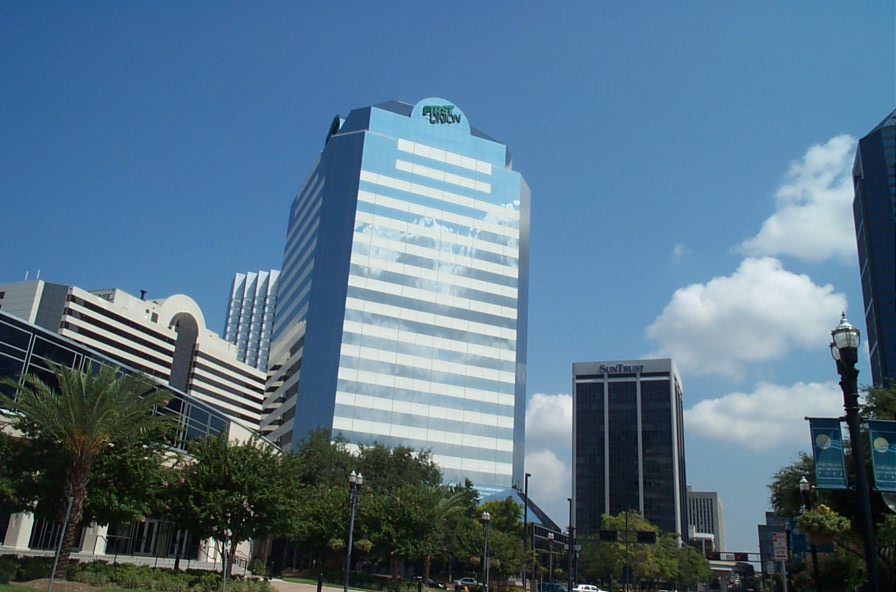
First Union Bank Tower in Jacksonville, Florida

On April 16, 2001, First Union announced it would merge with Wachovia. This was viewed with great surprise by the financial press and security analysts. While Wachovia had been viewed as an acquisition candidate after running into problems with earnings and credit quality in 2000, the suitor shocked analysts as many speculated that Wachovia would be sold to Atlanta-based SunTrust.

As an important part of the deal, while First Union was the nominal survivor, the merged company would assume the Wachovia name and stock ticker symbol (though it retained First Union's pre-2001 stock price history). Analysts said this move was most likely to help First Union acquire a new identity, as Wachovia's reputation was far better with consumers than First Union. At the same time, Wachovia's name and corporate identity would survive.

The deal met with skepticism and criticism. Analysts, remembering the problems with the CoreStates acquisition, were concerned about First Union's ability to merge with another large company. Winston-Salem's citizens and politicians suffered a blow to their civic pride because the merged company would be based in Charlotte, home to First Union. City leaders were concerned both by job losses and the loss of stature from losing a major corporate headquarters. First Union was concerned by the potential deposit attrition and customer loss in the city. First Union responded to these concerns by placing the wealth management and Carolinas-region headquarters in Winston-Salem.

On May 14, 2001, SunTrust announced a rival takeover bid for Wachovia, the first hostile takeover attempt in the banking sector in many years. In its effort to make the deal appeal to investors, SunTrust argued that it would provide a smoother transition than First Union and offered a higher cash price for Wachovia stock than First Union.

Wachovia's board of directors rejected SunTrust's offer and supported the merger with First Union. SunTrust continued its hostile takeover attempt, leading to a bitter battle over the summer between SunTrust and First Union. Both banks increased their offers for Wachovia, took out newspaper ads, mailed letters to shareholders, and initiated court battles to challenge each other's takeover bids. On August 3, 2001, Wachovia shareholders approved the First Union deal, rejecting SunTrust's attempts to elect a new board of directors for Wachovia and ending SunTrust's hostile takeover attempt.

Another issue concerned each bank's credit card division. In April 2001, Wachovia agreed to sell its $8 billion credit card portfolio to Bank One. The cards, which would have still been branded as Wachovia, would have been issued through Bank One's First USA division. First Union sold its credit card portfolio to MBNA in August 2000. After entering into negotiations, the new Wachovia agreed to buy back its portfolio from Bank One in September 2001 and resell it to MBNA. Wachovia paid Bank One a $350 million termination fee.

On September 4, 2001, First Union officially completed its purchase of Wachovia National Bank to formally become the newly named Wachovia Corporation. In order to prevent a repeat of the CoreStates problems, the new Wachovia phased the conversion of legacy Wachovia National Bank computer systems into the First Union systems, now using the Wachovia name. The company first began converting systems in the southeast United States, where both banks had branches, before moving to the Northeast, where First Union branches only had to change their signs to reflect the new company name and logo. This process ended on August 18, 2003, almost two years after the merger took place.

When First Union bought Wachovia, Charlotte's One, Two, and Three First Union buildings became One, Two, and Three Wachovia Center (respectively), and the 55-story First Union Financial Center in downtown Miami became the Wachovia Financial Center. The merger also affected the names of the indoor professional sports arenas in Philadelphia and Wilkes-Barre, Pennsylvania. Formerly known as the First Union Center and the First Union Spectrum, both in Philadelphia, and First Union Arena in Wilkes-Barre, they became the Wachovia Center, Wachovia Spectrum, and Wachovia Arena at Casey Plaza, respectively. In 2010, following Wachovia's merger into Wells Fargo, the Spectrum was demolished and the other venues became the Wells Fargo Center and the Mohegan Sun Arena at Casey Plaza.
