= NationsBank Plaza =

NationsBank Plaza is the former name of:

- Bank of America Plaza (Atlanta), Georgia
- Bank of America Plaza (Charlotte), North Carolina
- Bank of America Plaza (Dallas), Texas
