= One South at The Plaza =

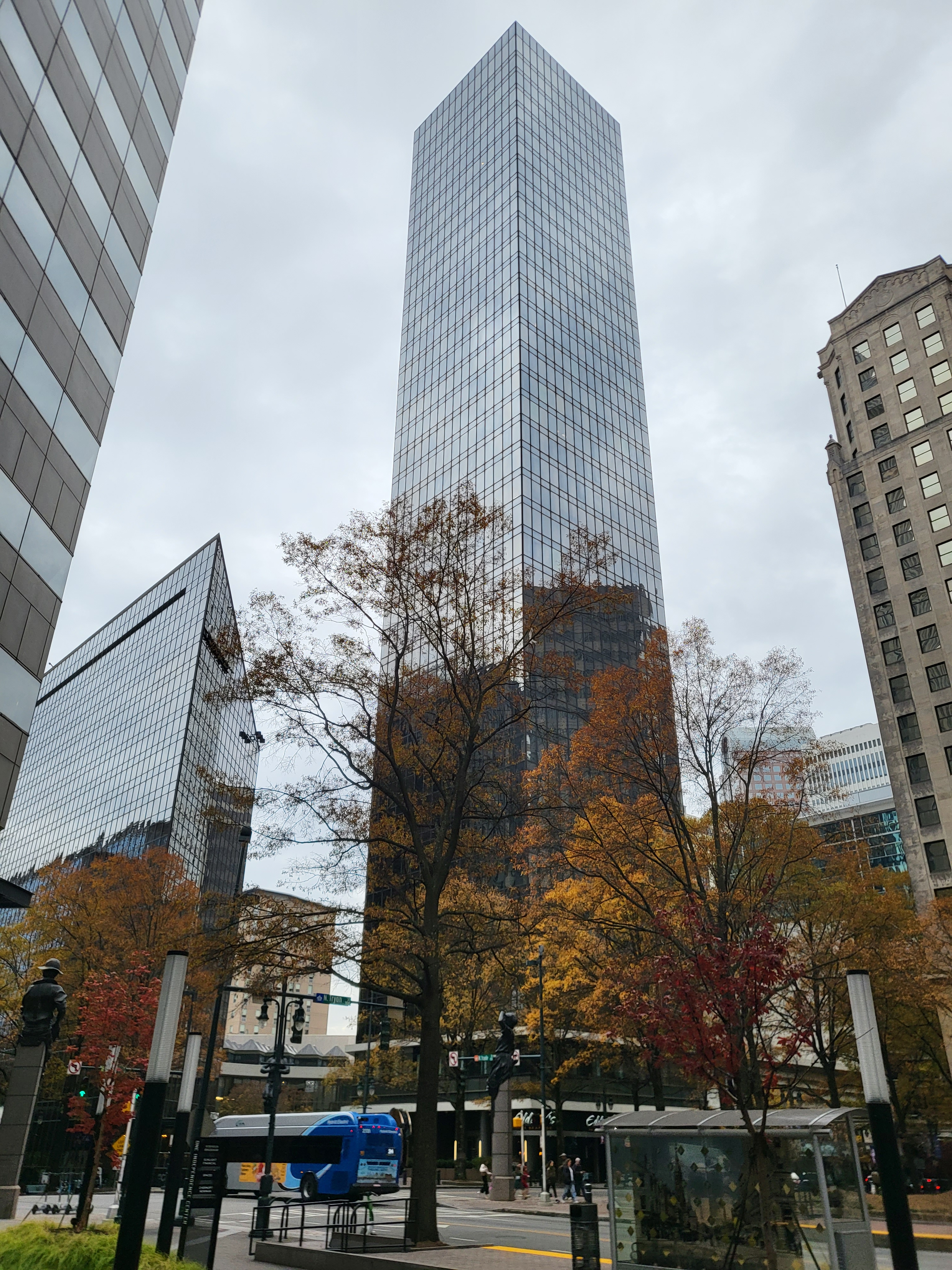
- One South at The Plaza viewed from One Independence Center in December 2023.
- Interactive map of the One South at The Plaza area

General information
- Status: Completed
- Type: Office / Retail
- Location: 101 South Tryon Street
- Coordinates: 35.2266°N 80.8432°W
- Construction started: August 1972
- Opening: March 1974
- Cost: $40 million
- Owner: Tourmaline Capital Partners and Monarch Alternative Capital

Height
- Antenna spire: 503 feet (153 m)

Technical details
- Floor count: 40
- Floor area: 891,136 square feet (82,789 m^{2})

Design and construction
- Developer: Independence Square Associates

Other information
- Public transit: Tryon Street

One South at The Plaza (formerly the Bank of America Plaza) is a 503-foot (153 m), 40-story skyscraper in Charlotte, North Carolina. It is the 8th tallest in the city, and the city's tallest from 1974 to 1987. It contains 891,000 square feet (82,777 m^{2}) of rentable area of which 75,000 sq ft (7,000 m^{2}) of retail space, and the rest office space. On the ground floor is the Overstreet Mall, which connects to neighboring buildings via skybridges; located below-grade is the parking garage with space for 456 vehicles and leases a nearby five-level garage, providing 730 additional parking spaces.

== History ==
The Redevelopment Commission, the prior owner of the 3-acre building site, in March 1971 agreed to sell it to Independence Square Associates in three transactions for a total of $1 million. Independence Square Associates was a joint venture between North Carolina National Bank and Crow, Carter, and Associates. The first parcel was 1-acre, and it was sold to ISA in August 1972. The second parcel was sold to ISA in late 1972. The final parcels were sold in May 1973. The three parcels were originally between the business of the S.H. Kress & CO building, Simpson Photo Service, and a Belk department store occupied a portion of the block the building was being built on. The original construction cost was $40 million. The client of the building, North Carolina National Bank, took out a $28 million loan from Metropolitan Life Insurance Company to cover construction costs for the tower and a 6-story 650 space parking structure.

The tower was 1 of 3 buildings under construction or newly finished in Uptown at that time. These 3 also included the new Wachovia building and Southern National Center, the 3 added totaled 1,400,000 square feet (130,000 m^{2}) of office space. At this point in Charlotte history, it was the biggest office building boom. However, developers were optimist that the new supply would be quickly occupied. Don Browning, general manager of Independence Square Associates, stated this about his optimism about the market's ability to fill the office space in the building prior to its opening "If it continues the way it's been going, it will be more than 100 percent leased". This construction boom increased office space in Uptown from 2,300,000 square feet (210,000 m^{2}) in 1969 to 7,000,000 square feet (650,000 m^{2}) in 1974 at a development cost of $164.4 million.

As predicted the building saw a lot of leases signed prior to opening. The first of many pre-leases came in February 1973 Aetna Life announced they had signed a lease for 40,000 square feet (3,700 m^{2}) in the building to house 300 employees. Then the next month in March 1973 Bache & Co. signed a lease for 30,000 square feet (2,800 m^{2}) which included the 40th floor of the building. Later in the year in June 1973 The Charlotte Athletic Club announced they had signed a lease for 25,000 square feet (2,300 m^{2}) and planned to occupy the space in the fall of 1975. In January 1974 another tenant announced they were leasing space ahead of the March 1974 building open. Korf Industries had signed a lease for 60,000 square feet (5,600 m^{2}). The company relocated their corporate headquarters from Georgetown, South Carolina to occupy space on the 37th, 38th, and 39th floors.

In addition to new tenants in December 1973 it was announced that the plaza of the building would have a 5-ton sculpture from Italy that was a rotating cast bronze disc 15 feet in diameter called "Il Grande Disco" is located in the plaza adjacent to the building. The sculpture was in the part of the plaza between the hotel and tower which included granite pavers, with trees and shrubbery throughout the plaza. The sculpture was created by Italian sculpture Arnaldo Pomodoro. In 1973 it was worth $400,000.

The building opened in March 1974 as NCNB Plaza, it served as the world headquarters for NCNB and its successor, NationsBank, until the opening of NationsBank Corporate Center in 1992. NCNB moved in over a 3-month period. At time of completion it was the tallest building in North Carolina until it was surpassed by One First Union Center in 1987. The tower is located at the intersection of East Trade Street and South Tryon Street.

After the building opened in May 1974 Midrex, a steel maker based out of Toledo, Ohio, announced it was leasing the 40th floor in the building. Midrex was a subsidiary of Korf Industries formed in 1974 Also, in May 1974 Midrex posted an ad in the Charlotte Observer to recruit 225 people for engineering, design, and accounting jobs in Charlotte to expand its headcount in the building.

The building has been renamed several times due to bank mergers. In January 1992 the building was renamed NationsBank Plaza after the completion of the C&S/Sovran Corp merger. In February 1999 as part of the Bank of America merger the building was renamed Bank of America Plaza and it maintained this named until it was renamed in 2019.

NCNB Plaza was built along with the 350-room Radisson Plaza. In 1998, LaSalle Advisors of Chicago owned NationsBank Plaza and the Radisson Plaza when Omni Hotels, which exited Charlotte two years earlier, bought the hotel with plans for an $8 million renovation, making it a Four Diamond luxury hotel.

In modern history, in January 2006 it was announced that Bank of America had renewed their lease for 640,000 square feet (59,458 m^{2}). At the time of their renewal their space in the building was larger than the 500,000 square feet (46,452 m^{2}) space they occupied in their headquarters Bank of America Corporate Center directly across the street. Later that year in November 2006 Behringer Harvard purchased the building for $194.1 million. At the time of the sale, it had 75,000 square feet (6,968 m^{2}) of retail and 812,000 square feet (75,437 m^{2}) of office space. It was Charlotte's 5th largest tower.

Bank of America announced in November 2010 it would be reducing their leased space in the building by 65,000 feet (19,812 m) due to moving to the recently completed 1 Bank of America Center. They planned to occupy 95% of the 750,000 square feet (69,677 m^{2}) available space in 1 Bank of America Center. At the time of the space reduction Bank of America was still the largest tenant in the building occupying 488,000 square feet (45,337 m^{2}).

In September 2011 long term tenant Law firm Alston & Bird announced they had signed a 10-year renewal lease for 90,000 square feet (8,361 m^{2}). The firm had occupied the building since 2001 when they moved from their office on Morehead Street. At the time of the renewal, they had 107 local employees.

At the end of 2015 the building gained a new retail tenant when the restaurant Essex opened a 5,000 square feet (465 m^{2}) ground floor location. The location was formerly the home of Merrill Lynch's Uptown offices. The space opens onto the plaza with outdoor seating covered in glass, the construction required the existing fountain to be covered.

TIER REIT, the building's owner, announced in May 2016 they would invest $20 million for renovations to add more street level retail. The renovations were completed by May 2017. At this point the building's previous bank branch now vacate, along with vacate office space, and part of the lobby was combined to add street retail. The idea was to energize the corner at Trade St and Tryon St and enhance nightlife. As part of the renovations three new restaurants opened in the new space which included Eddie V's with 10,805 square feet (1,004 m^{2}) announced in March 2017, Deven & Blakely with 3,050 square feet (283 m^{2}) also announced in March 2017, Indigo Road announced in October 2017 with 1,783 square feet (166 m^{2}) and Tupelo Honey with 4,800 square feet (446 m^{2}) which opened in March 2020.

Later in 2016 in November 2016 McNair Law Firm announced it would move into 5,763 square feet (535 m^{2}). The move provided the firm with more flexible and collaborative space. They were previously located at 301 South Tryon.

Another major tenant was announced December 2017, Consolidated Claims Group relocated its headquarters from South Park to the building, occupying 21,000 square feet (1,951 m^{2}) of space. The move allowed the company to continue to grow its headcount. At the time of the move CCG had 60 employees.

The building was purchased by Cousin's Properties Inc. March 2019, which resulted from their purchase of TIER REIT. The purchase provided Cousin's with 21,000,000 square feet (1,950,964 m^{2}) of property across many Sunbelt cities including Charlotte. Cousin's had become an important landlord in Charlotte through numerous acquisitions.

After the exit of Bank of America as a tenant in 2020, in January 2021 the building was renamed One South at The Plaza. Their departure left 350,000 square feet (32,516 m^{2}). The space available was across floors 3 to 19. Cousin's, the building's owner, with the new name announcement also announced that the building would be ongoing a $10 million renovation. This will included corridor updates, elevator lobby renovations, changing the building signage, and updating the floors Bank of America occupied.

In July 2021 Cousins Properties sold the building to Tourmaline Capital Partners and Monarch Alternative Capital for $271.5 million. When the sale was final the tower was 58% leased.

In February 2022 it was announced that law firm Alston & Bird would be relocating from the building to Vantage South End East Tower, occupying 55,312 square feet (5,139 m^{2}) in the new building. At the time of relocation, the firm had 200 local employees and occupied 109,000 feet (33,223 m) in the building. Tourmaline Capital Partners, the building's owner, in December 2022 completed a $7 million renovation of the building. It focused on the creation of a third floor 23,000 square feet (2,137 m^{2}) tenant amenity space. This new space included new furniture, a full-service café with a barista, concierge service, on-site IT consultants, a work lounge with windows overlooking Trade and Tryon, a soundproof recording and podcast studio, and a virtual golf simulator. Jeff Fronek, Tourmaline managing principal, said this about the renovations "The third floor is the first phase of where we're delivering on the promise of providing enhanced capabilities ... It's a space that feels good to be in," he said. "We knew through tracking the market, what it could be and thought we could play a constructive role in what the next chapter of this building and uptown could look like." In June 2023 the Charlotte Business Journal reported that the building has 62.3% of its space available which is 555,470 square feet (51,605 m^{2}).

As of February 2023 the 2022 renovations had attracted new tenants. The first new tenants was Optimi, a consulting company, moving from 200 South Tryon into a 15,000 square feet (1,394 m^{2}) space. The second new tenant was Fox Rothschild, a law firm that is moving its operations from One Independence to occupy 9,371 square feet (871 m^{2}). The third new tenant was an unnamed bank that would be occupying 10,834 square feet (1,007 m^{2}).

Since the second half of 2024 Trinity Partners, the building's leasing company, has signed 92,000 square feet (8,547 m^{2}) in new deals and expansions. The latest of these new deals is Deriva Energy signed a lease for 33,606 square feet (3,122 m^{2}). As of May 2025, the building is 66% leased. In June 2025 Atlanta based Trimont, agreed to lease 68,000 square feet (6,317 m^{2}) across floors 12, 14 and 15. This latest lease brings the building occupancy to 75% as of June 2025. In December 2025 Los Angeles based City National Bank opened a 22,000 square feet (2,044 m^{2}) office in the building to house 120 employees across commercial banking, credit solutions, risk management and audit functions. This office is the bank's entrance to the Charlotte market.

In April 2026 Trinity Partners secured 40,000 square feet (3,716 m^{2}) in new leases. The new leaseholders include Choreo Advisors leasing 15,619 square feet (1,451 m^{2}), CITCO Technology Management leasing 8,299 square feet (771 m^{2}), law firm GRSM leasing 4,202 square feet (390 m^{2}), and commercial real estate advisory firm BWE leasing 9,339 square feet (868 m^{2}). The building will be 80% occupied once the new leaseholders move in.

In September 2026, Huntington Bank announced it had planned to install signage at the top of the building

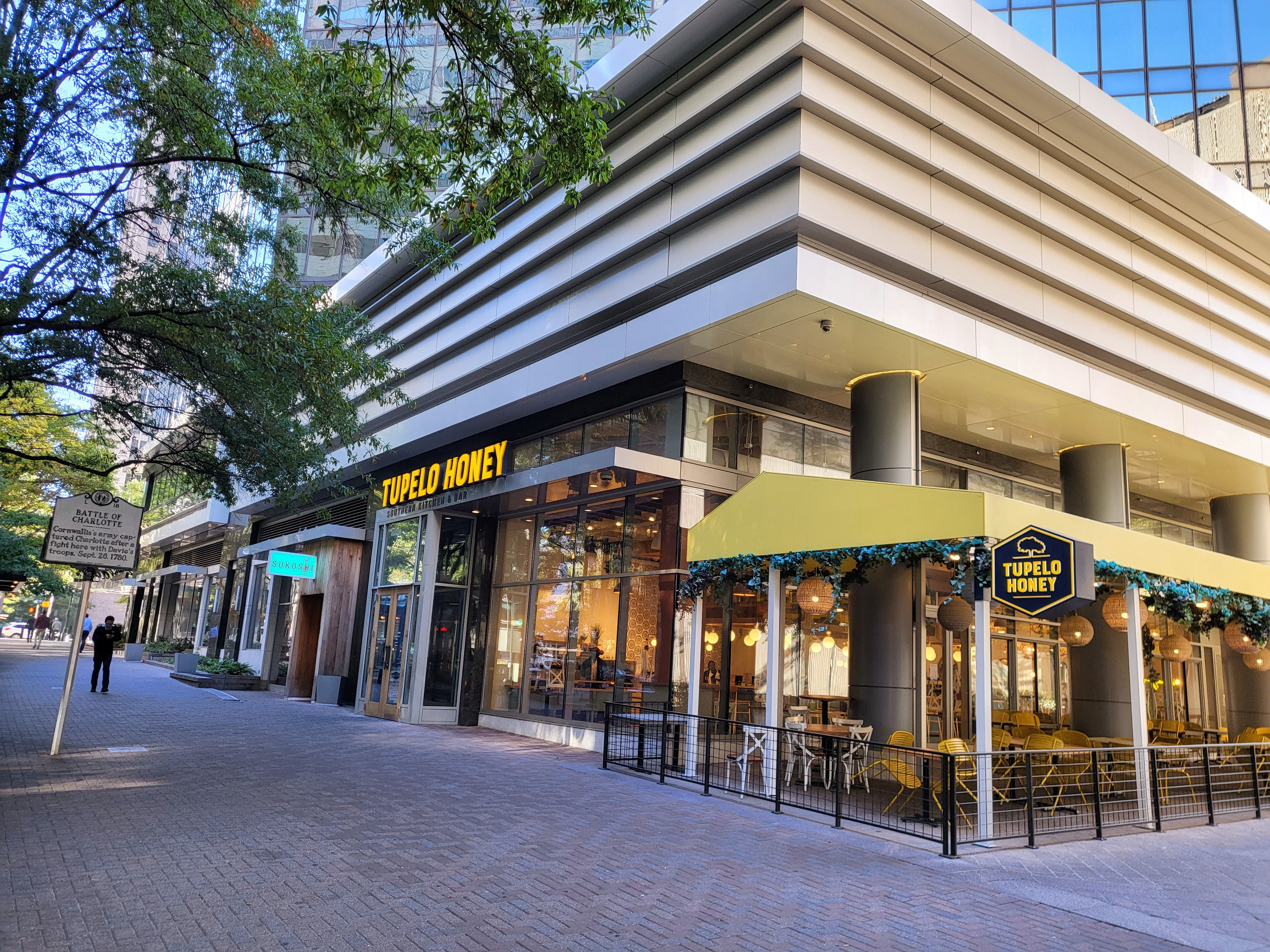
The building's ground floor retail in October 2022.

== See also ==
- List of tallest buildings in Charlotte
- List of tallest buildings in North Carolina

Preceded by Jefferson First Union Tower	Tallest Building in Charlotte; 1974—1988; 153 m	Succeeded by One First Union Center
