= 200 South College =

Skyscraper in North Carolina, United States

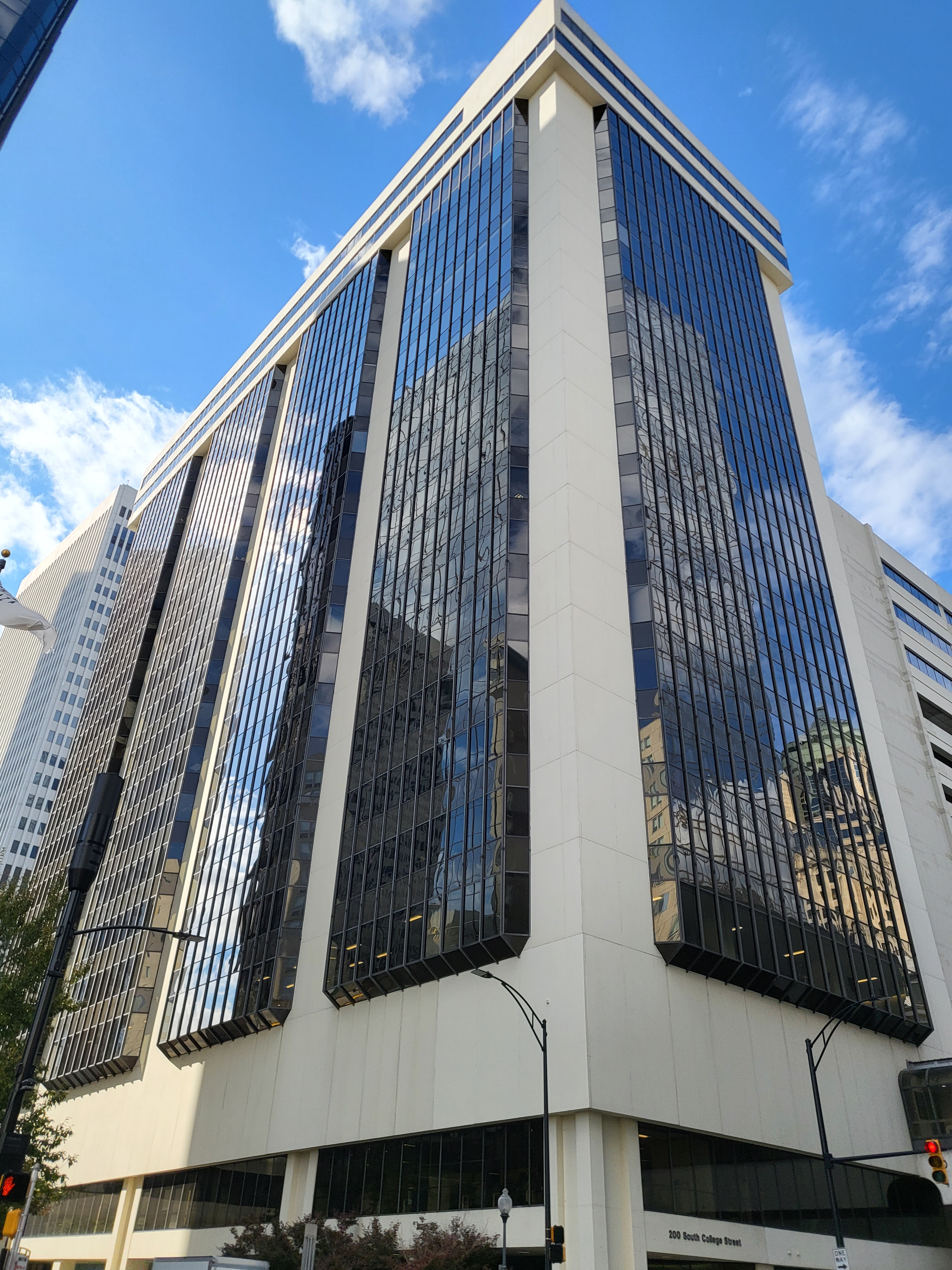
- Interactive map of the 200 South College area
- Former names: BB&T Center

General information
- Status: Completed
- Type: Office
- Architectural style: Modern
- Location: 200 South College Street, Charlotte, North Carolina
- Coordinates: 35°13′31″N 80°50′37″W
- Opening: 1975; 51 years ago
- Owner: BB&T Properties LLC

Height
- Roof: 300 ft (91 m)

Technical details
- Floor count: 22
- Floor area: 567,865 square feet (52,756.4 m^{2})

Design and construction
- Architects: Little & Associates

Other information
- Parking: On-site parking garage
- Public transit: 3rd Street/CC

200 South College (formerly BB&T Center) is a 300-foot (91 m) high-rise in Charlotte, North Carolina. Completed in 1975, it consists of 22 floors and an 11-story parking garage. On the second floor, it is connected to neighboring buildings via skybridges, as part of the Overstreet Mall.

== History ==
The building was developed for Southern National Bank. The idea to construct the building was first announced in December 1970. Earlier in the year Southern National had acquired Bank of Charlotte, which gave them four 100-year old buildings on South Tryon Street. The bank undertook a $300,000 renovation of one of these buildings. However, the renovation was abandoned when the contractor discovered that the old brick turned to powder when it was touched. Southern National determined that none of the four buildings could be renovated. When the Charlotte Observer reported on this, Dewey D. Godfrey, executive vice president in charge of local operations, told the newspaper the bank still had not decided to build. However, he said about the success of a new building. "I bet we could rent it all out tomorrow, if we were definitely going to build."

Originally the building was intended to be 13 stories. However, in January 1974 Southern Bell signed a lease for 300,000 square feet (28,000 m^{2}) of space. The building's floor count increased to 22 floors and the floor area from 237,000 square feet (22,000 m^{2}) to its current 586,000 square feet (54,400 m^{2}). The project's price tag doubled from $13 to $26 million. Part of the expansion was adding office space to floors 11 to 13 by building above the parking garage. This allowed Southern Bell to locate departments together on floors within the building. At the time of the announcement in January 1974, Southern Bell had 1,124 North Carolina–based employees housed in seven office buildings in Charlotte, for a total of 245,000 square feet (22,800 m^{2}). The company's space in the building allowed them to locate all North Carolina employee in one building.

Rodney Little of Little & Co. said that in 1975, Overstreet Mall, based on a Minneapolis design, was expected to be a big success as concern began about retailers moving to the suburbs. For this reason, Southern National Center did not face a major street, but was intended to be part of a network of bridges between office buildings and major stores such as Belk and Ivey's. Another reason for locating along College Street was the concern that Tryon Street would run out of space. However, in the 1980s, the Charlotte City Council decided to limit additional walkways, and the uptown Belk and Ivey's closed by the end of the decade.

Southern National Center was the home of the Charlotte headquarters of Southern Bell from 1975 to 1995. When BellSouth, the successor company to Southern Bell, moved to the 16-story BellSouth Plaza in 1995, Little & Co. made plans for a $10 million renovation to attract new tenants. The merger of Southern National Bank and BB&T, which resulted in a name change to BB&T Center, meant that BB&T increased its space to 59,000 square feet (5,500 m^{2}), and NationsBank took 285,000 square feet (26,500 m^{2}), but 166,181 sq ft (15,438.7 m^{2}) still remained vacant. Among the building's problems were the facts that most of the floor space had been designed specifically for Southern Bell, and the lobby was on the third floor due to the Overstreet Mall. An advantage was the 1500-space parking deck inside.

In August 1999 the New York–based Winstar Communications Inc. signed a lease for 12,795 square feet (1,188.7 m^{2}) for a switching station. The station only employed a few people. However, at the time of signing the lease, the company was looking for a 10,000 square feet (930 m^{2}) office to house sales staff, technical, and administrative workers.

NationsBank became Bank of America, and in 2001 and 2002 gave up 140,000 square feet (13,000 m^{2}) as part of its operation moved to Gateway Center, leaving 240,000 square feet (22,000 m^{2}) still occupied. In 2004, BB&T agreed to increase its space in the building by 21,000 square feet (2,000 m^{2}) to 100,000 square feet (9,300 m^{2}).

In February 2007, the CIM Group acquired the building for $117 million. BB&T, Bank of America, Mecklenburg Medical Group and AT&T were the largest tenants at the time of the sale. Spectrum Properties became the new leasing management company.

In February 2014, AIG signed a lease for 32,000 square feet (3,000 m^{2}) for a technology center on the 13th floor. The creation of the new office created 230 new jobs by 2017. The center jobs included design, development, testing and deployment of insurance software. The 13th floor became available as a result of Bank of America vacating three floors for a total of 180,000 square feet (17,000 m^{2}) earlier in the year. After the AIG lease, 151,478 square feet (14,072.8 m^{2}) remained available.

In May 2016, landlord Spectrum Properties renewed or issued new leases for a total of 80,000 square feet (7,400 m^{2}). TeKsystems and Aeroteks jointly signed on for 43,000 square feet (4,000 m^{2}), and AIG expanded its space to 23,450 square feet (2,179 m^{2}). The new building tenants were RingCentral leasing 12,351 square feet (1,147.4 m^{2}) and the University of South Carolina's Darla Moore School of Business with 5,000 square feet (460 m^{2}).

In November 2016 BB&T, the building's anchor tenant signed a 10-year newel lease for 120,000 square feet (11,000 m^{2}). The building served as the bank's regional headquarters, housing many lines of business and a bank branch on the first floor. The businesses housed there include Grandbridge Real Estate, BB&T Investments and BB&T Wealth Management. At the time of their renewal the building was 74% leased.

In June 2017 the building was purchased by Philadelphia-based Arden Group for $148.5 million. At the time of the sale, the building was 80% leased. When the purchase was announced, they revealed plans to spend $10 million to renovate the building. This included adding stone and porcelain walls and floors to the first and third floors, adding LED lights, and creating a tenant amenity center with training on the second floor. The renovations were completed in the third quarter of 2019. At the time of the announcement, 97,965 square feet (9,101.2 m^{2}) was available in the building.

In May 2020, the building's parking deck was sold to Cousins Properties Inc. for $85 million. The structure is 11 stories and has 1,520 spaces.

In January 2021 the building was sold for $115 million to BB&T Properties LLC. The Arden Group acquisition in 2017 for $148 million included the parking deck. However, only the building was sold in 2021. The building was 85% occupied at the time of the sale, with Truist Financial being the major tenant occupying 120,000 square feet (11,000 m^{2}) of the 586,646 square feet (54,501.2 m^{2}) in the building, with their lease expiring in 2026. The other tenants include AIG, TekSystems, Aerotek, and Ring Central.

In November 2021, Truist Financial announced it would be closing their branch in the building by mid-February 2022. It stated it plans to open a branch on the ground level of Truist Center. In November 2021, the branch employees were the only Truist employees left in the building. The bank is leasing 120,000 square feet (11,000 m^{2}) until 2026, when it will be opting to sublease. The building had served as BB&T's regional headquarters prior to the BB&T and SunTrust merger.

== See also ==
- List of tallest buildings in Charlotte
