= Levine Museum of the New South =

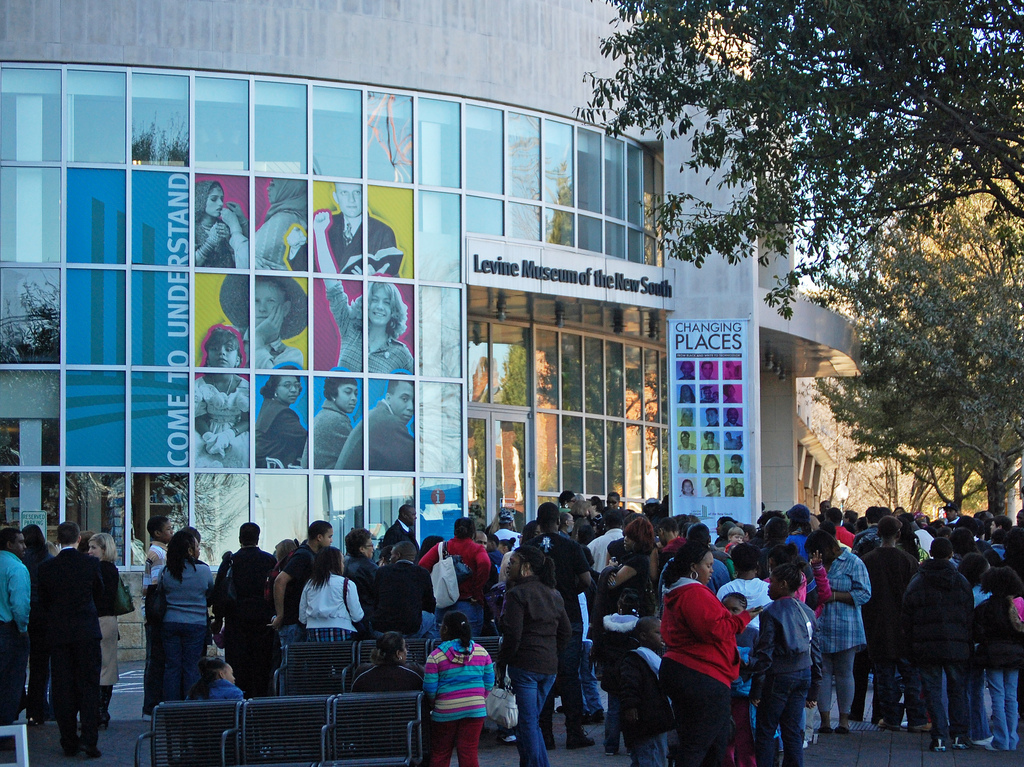
- Crowd gathers at the museum in 2010
- Established: April 25, 1991
- Location: 401 South Tryon Street; Charlotte, North Carolina
- Coordinates: 35°13′28″N 80°50′48″W
- Type: Local history museum
- President: Richard Cooper
- CEO: Richard Cooper
- Public transit access: 3rd Street/CC
- Website: www.museumofthenewsouth.org

The Levine Museum of the New South is a history museum located in Charlotte, North Carolina whose exhibits explore issues relevant to the history of the greater Charlotte metro area and spark curiosity about our world today. Founded in 1991 as the Museum of the New South, it was renamed after museum patron and Family Dollar founder Leon Levine in 2001.

== Overview ==
Originally opened in 2001 at Seventh and College streets, the museum's previous exhibit was called "Cotton Fields to Skyscrapers: Charlotte and the Carolina Piedmont in the New South", and featured period displays that reflected regional history. The displays included a one-room tenant farmer's house, a cotton mill and mill house, an African-American hospital, an early Belk department store, and a civil-rights era lunch counter. Changing exhibits focus on local culture, art and history.

In 2019, the museum had an exhibit "The Legacy of Lynching: Confronting Racial Terror in America", prepared in collaboration with the Equal Justice Initiative, who created the National Memorial for Peace and Justice.

Relocation was considered in 2020 because the site had no room for expansion and was worth $7.7 million according to county records. The COVID-19 pandemic was one reason for considering more virtual options. On June 16, 2021, the museum announced it would sell the downtown location and look for a new home. This news comes as the museum adds virtual activities such as the digital walking tour starting in August 2021. These changes come with the help of a $600,000 grant from the John S. and James L. Knight Foundation.

In March 2022, the museum announced the sale of its building for $10.75 million to Vela Uptown LLC, which planned to build a high-rise apartment building at the location. The museum closed in May to prepare for the move. The Museum then opened at 401 S. Tryon in the 6000 square feet Levine Center for the Arts at Three Wells Fargo Center, a space donated by Wells Fargo. Since then, the museum was closed again on May 4, 2025, and the museum is planning to move to a yet disclosed new location.

== Gallery ==
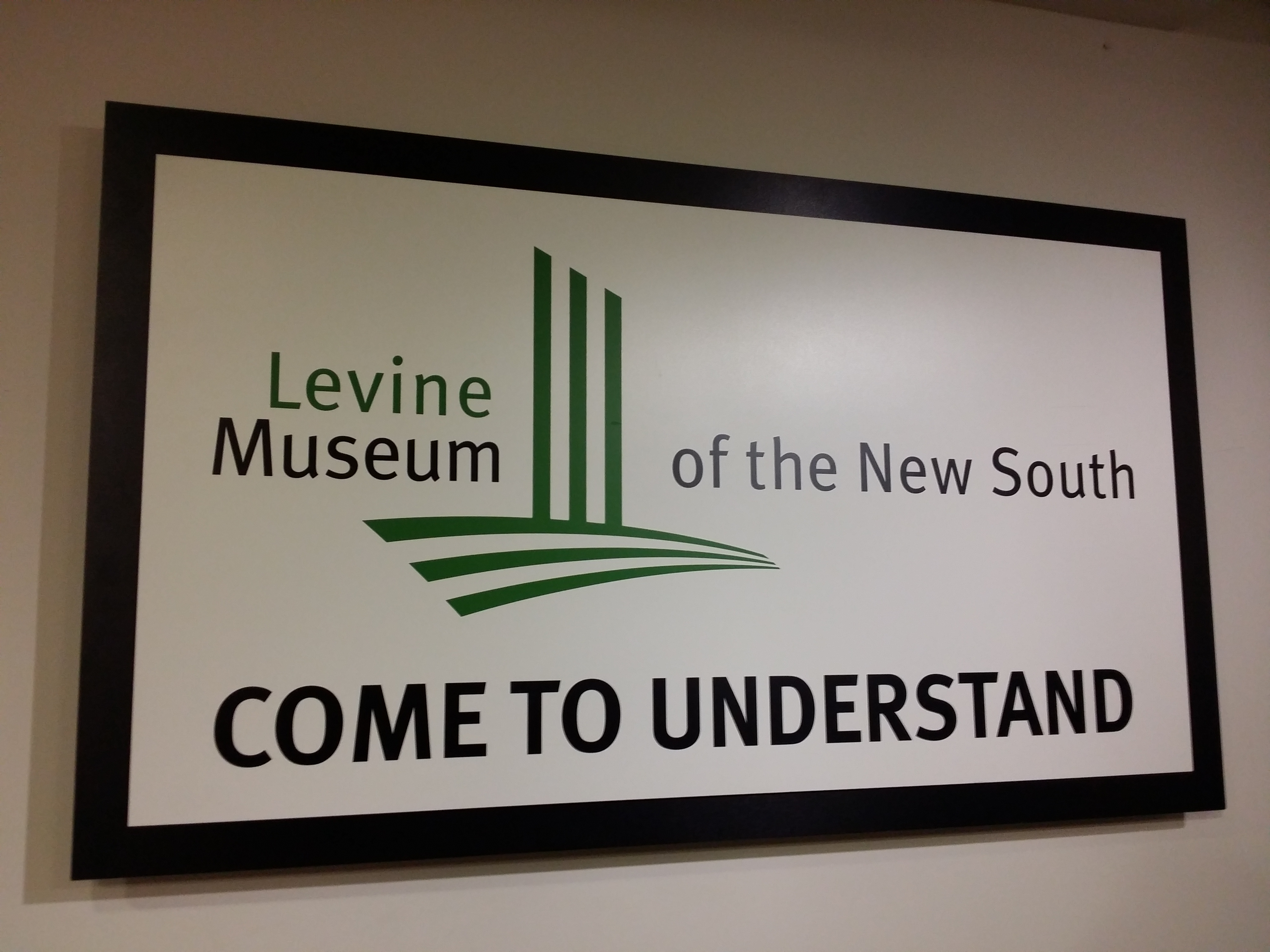
Entrance of Levine Museum of the New South

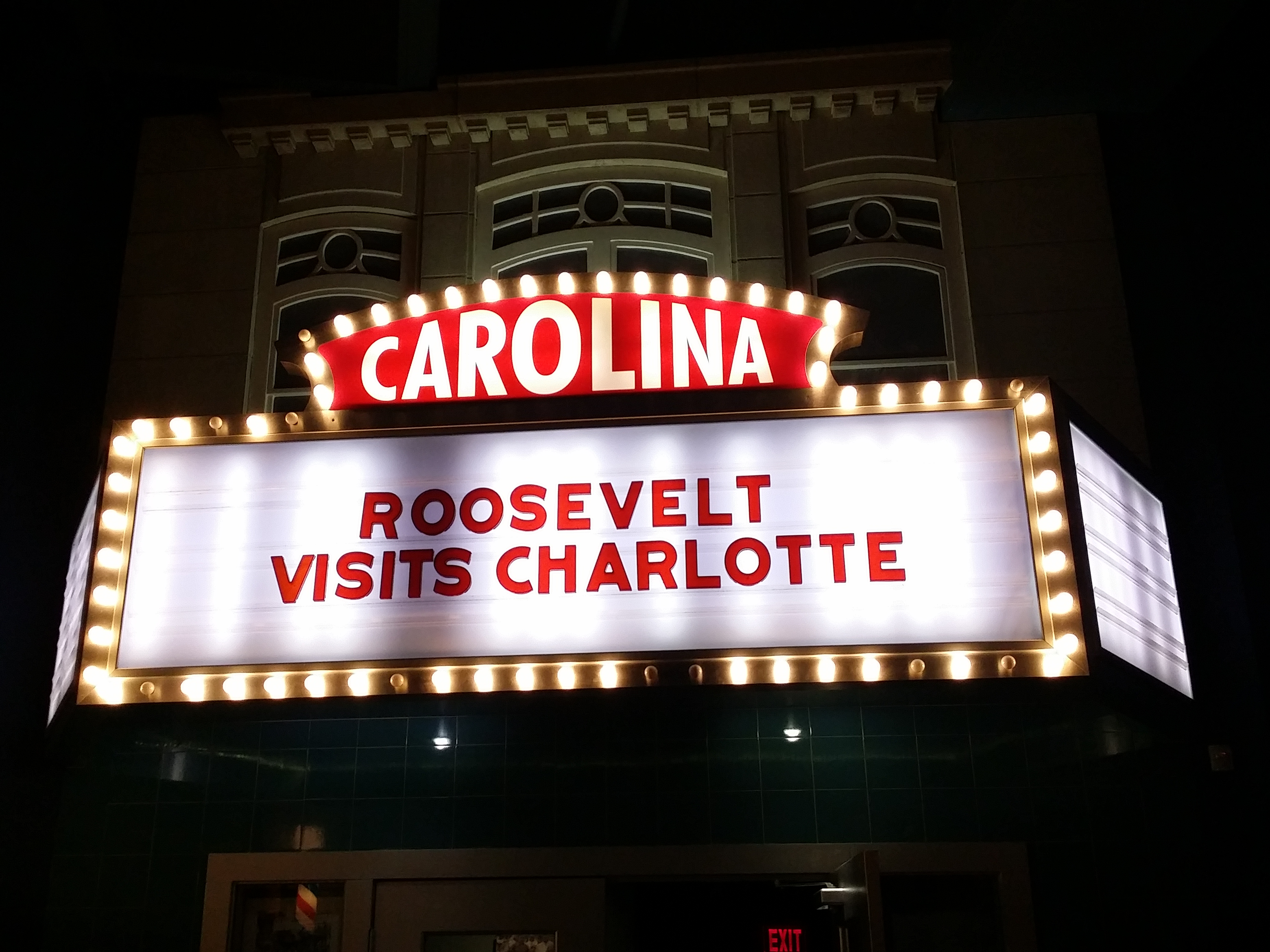
Welcome-Sign for President Roosevelt

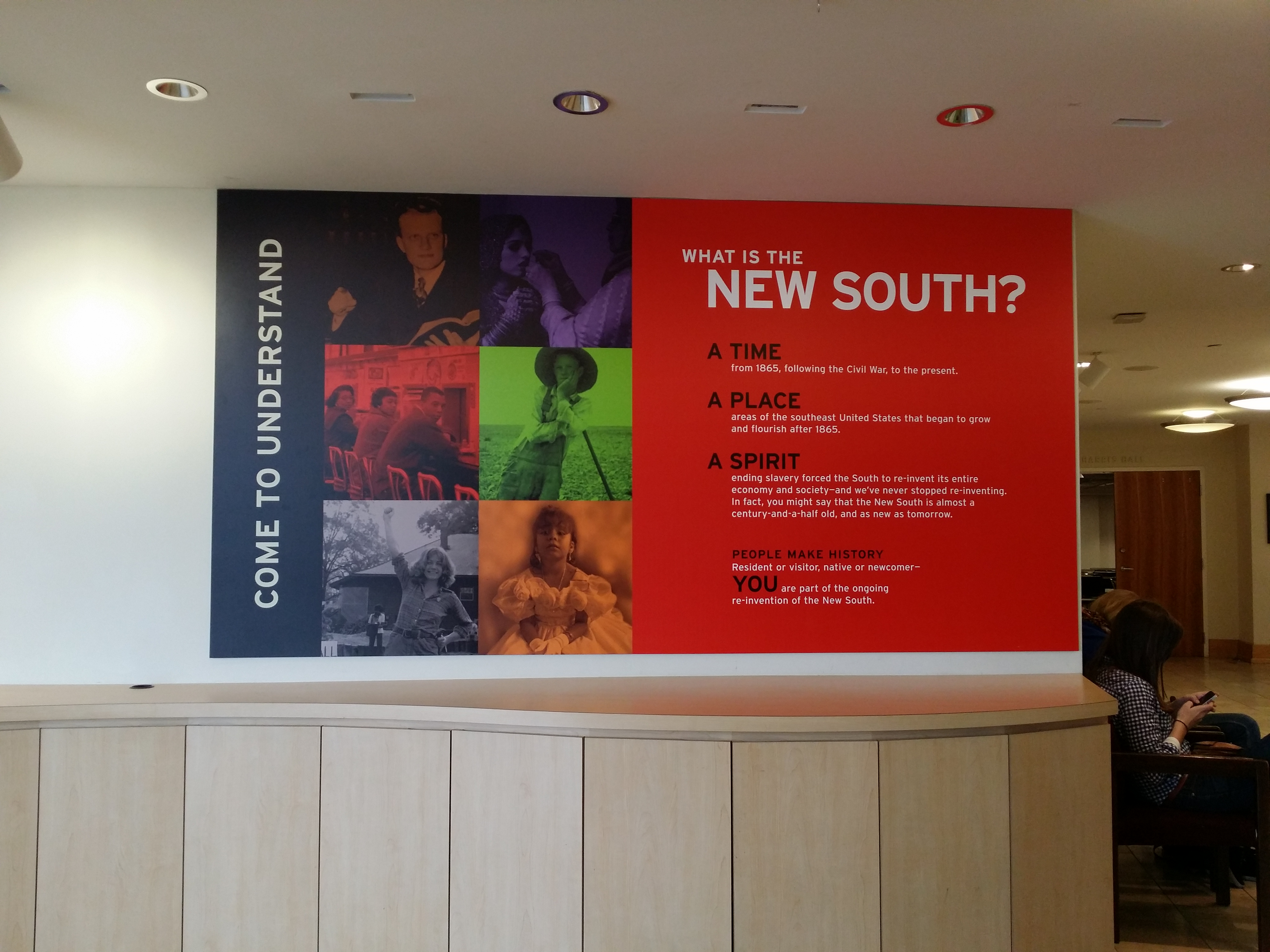
Explanation-Sign

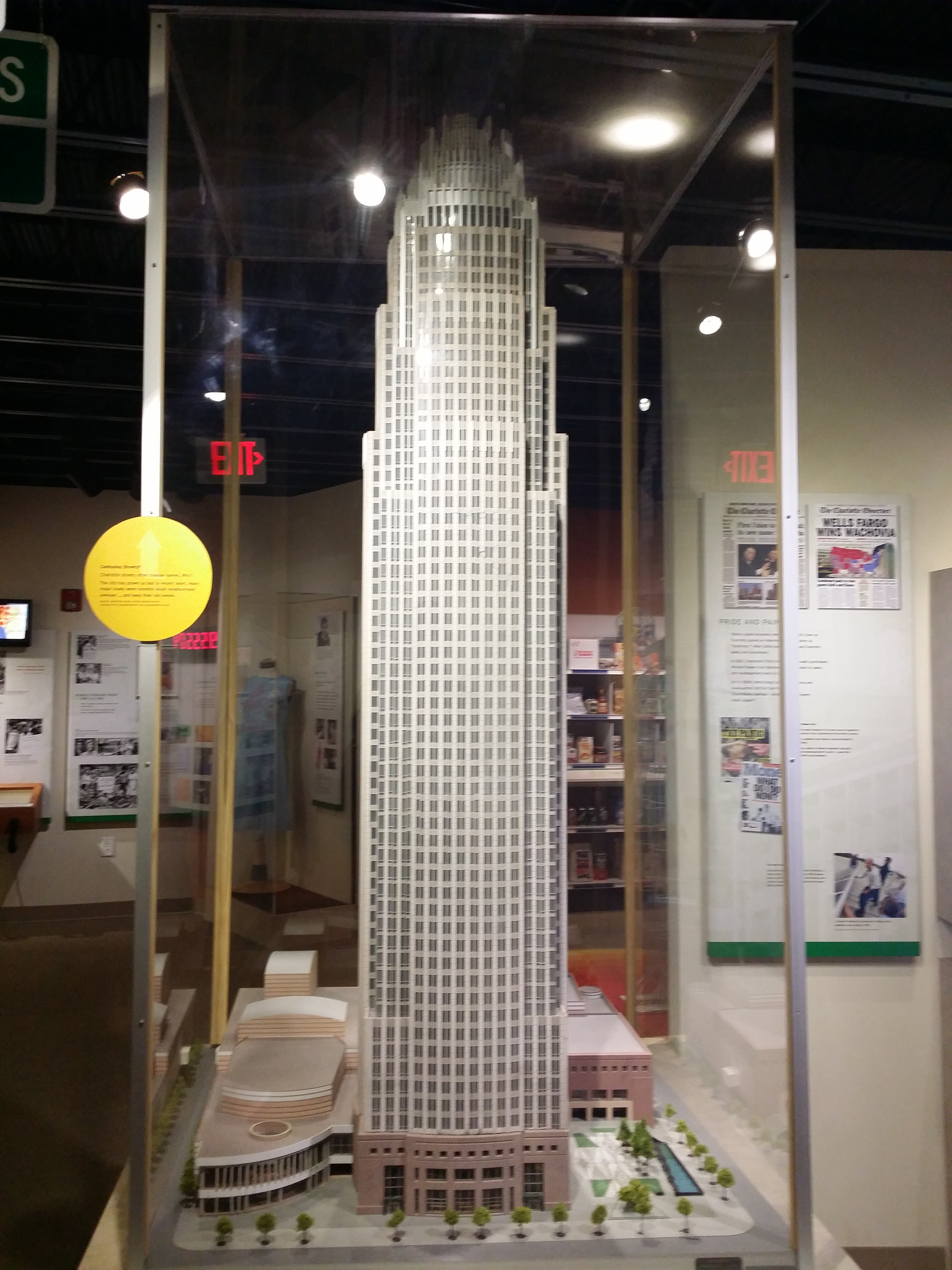
Model of Bank of America Corporate Center

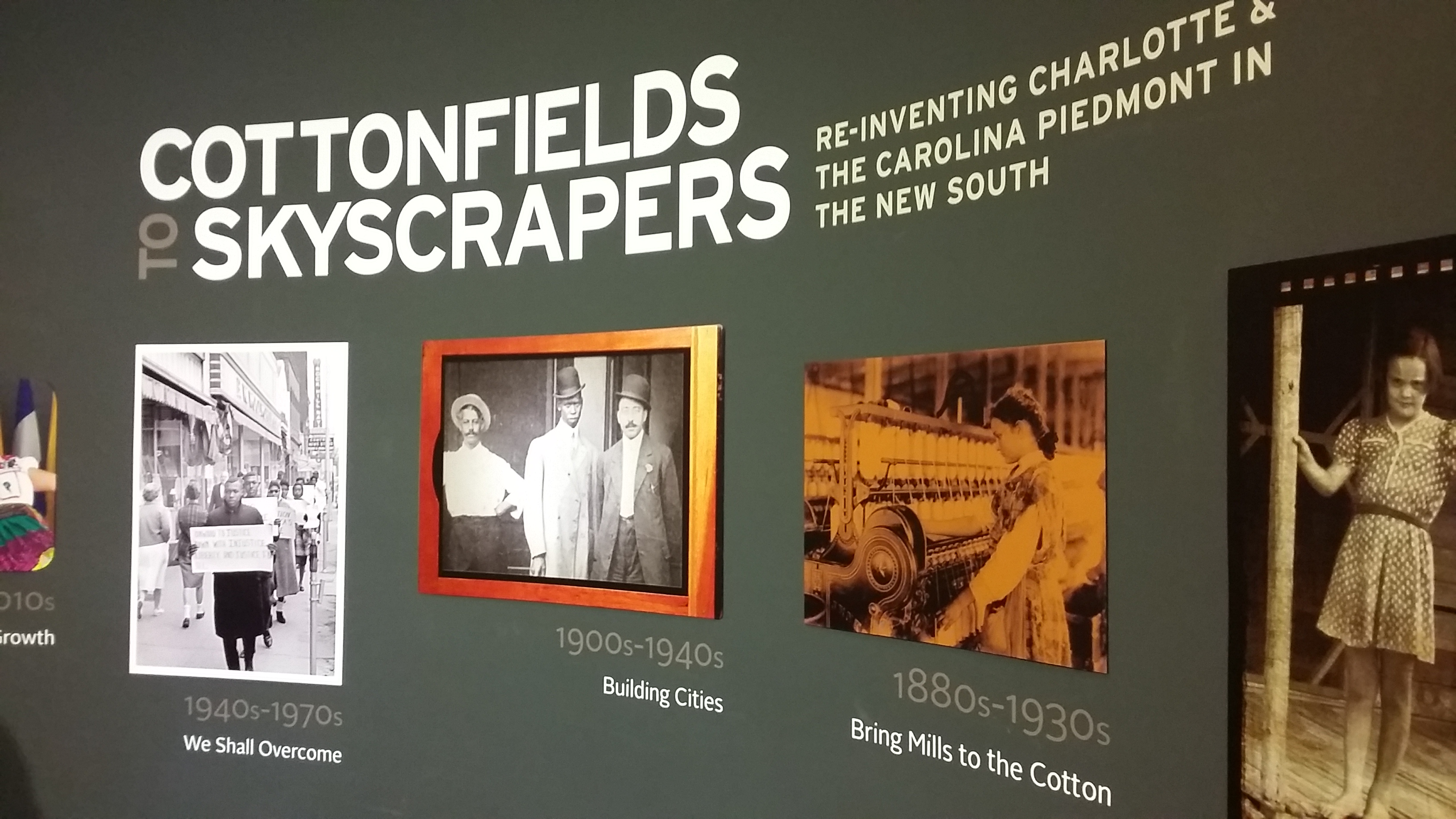
Entrance of "Cottonfields to Skyscrapers"

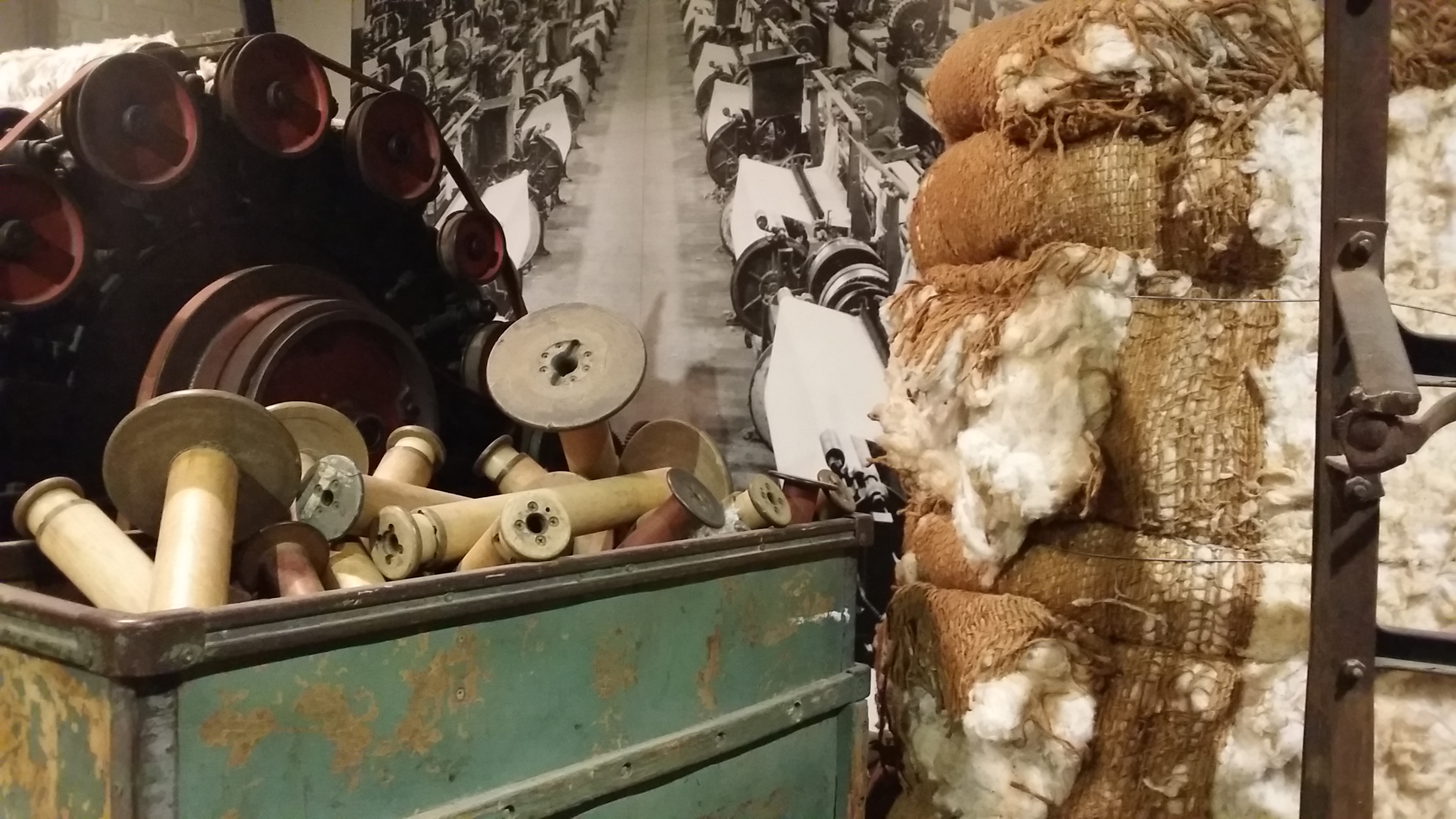
Cotton-Machine

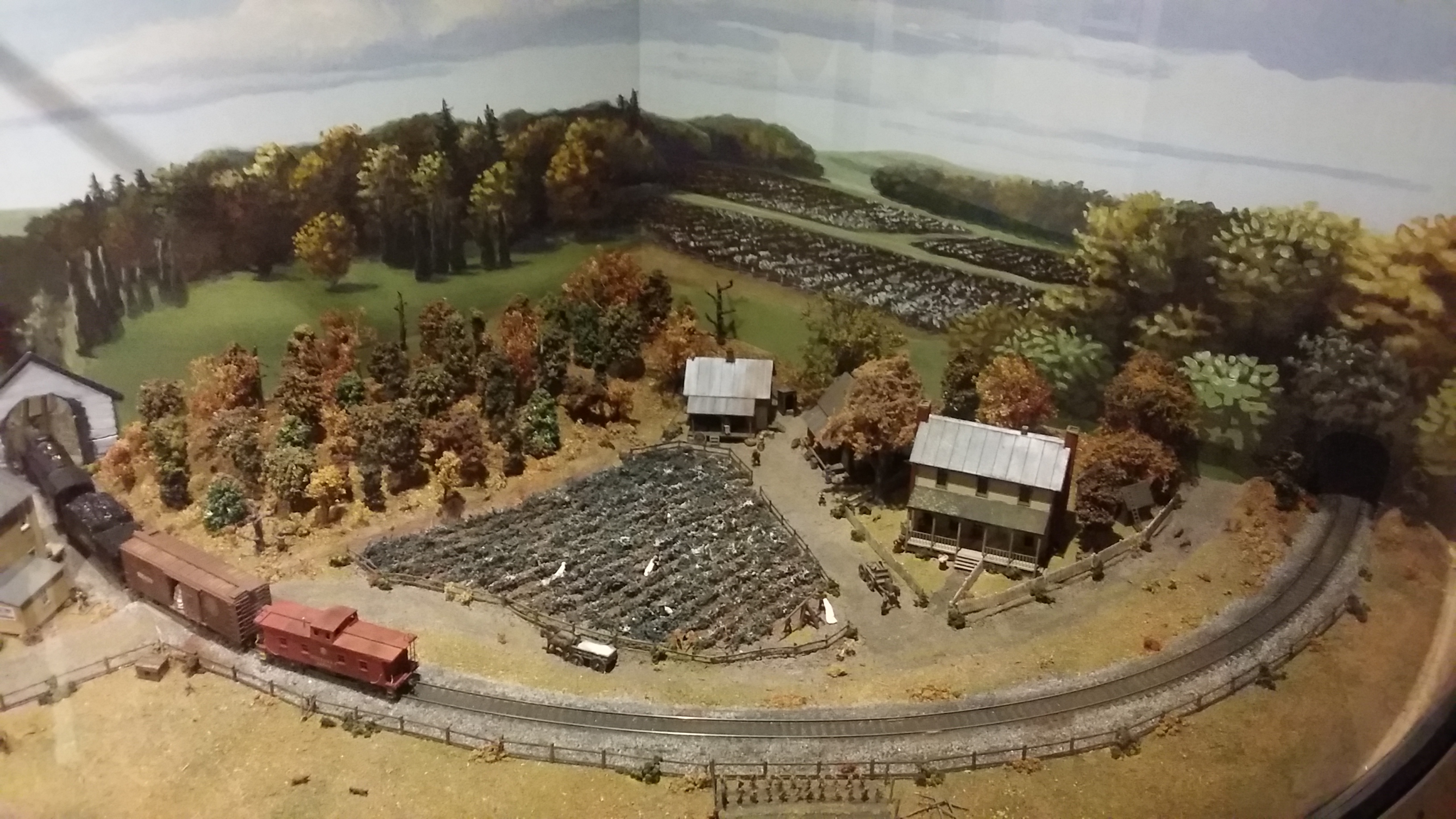
Model of plantation
