= Overstreet Mall =

- Location: Charlotte, North Carolina
- Coordinates: 35.2257°N 80.8433°W
- Opened: 1977
- Parking: 9 parking garages
- Public transit: 3rd Street/CC; CTC/Arena; Tryon Street

The Overstreet Mall is a series of pedestrian bridges in Uptown Charlotte. Proposed in 1971 and completed around 1977, the design was based on the design of the Milan Galleria and the Montreal Place Ville-Marie. The mall has about 1.5 miles (2.4 km) of walkways and bridges that connect various buildings between Three Wells Fargo Center and Truist Center.

Rodney Little of Little & Co. said that in 1975, based on a Minneapolis design, was expected to be a big success as concern began about retailers moving to the suburbs. For this reason, Southern National Center did not face a major street, but was intended to be part of a network of bridges between office buildings and major stores such as Belk and Ivey's. Another reason for locating along College Street was the concern Tryon Street would run out of space. However, in the 1980s, the Charlotte City Council decided to limit additional walkways, and the uptown Belk and Ivey's closed by the end of the decade.

== Connected facilities ==
11 buildings are connected through the Overstreet Mall; this includes seven hotels, nine parking garages, and three light rail/streetcar stations.

- 200 South College
- 301 South College
  - Hilton Hotel
- Bank of America Center
  - Ritz-Carlton
- Bank of America Corporate Center
  - Blumenthal Performing Arts Center
  - Founders Hall
- Charlotte Plaza
- One South at The Plaza
  - Omni Hotel
- Queen City Quarter
  - AC Hotel
  - Aloft Hotel
  - Residence Inn
- South Tryon Square
  - Marriott Courtyard
- Three Wells Fargo Center
- Truist Center
- Two Wells Fargo Center
