= 301 South Tryon =

Skyscraper in Charlotte, North Carolina

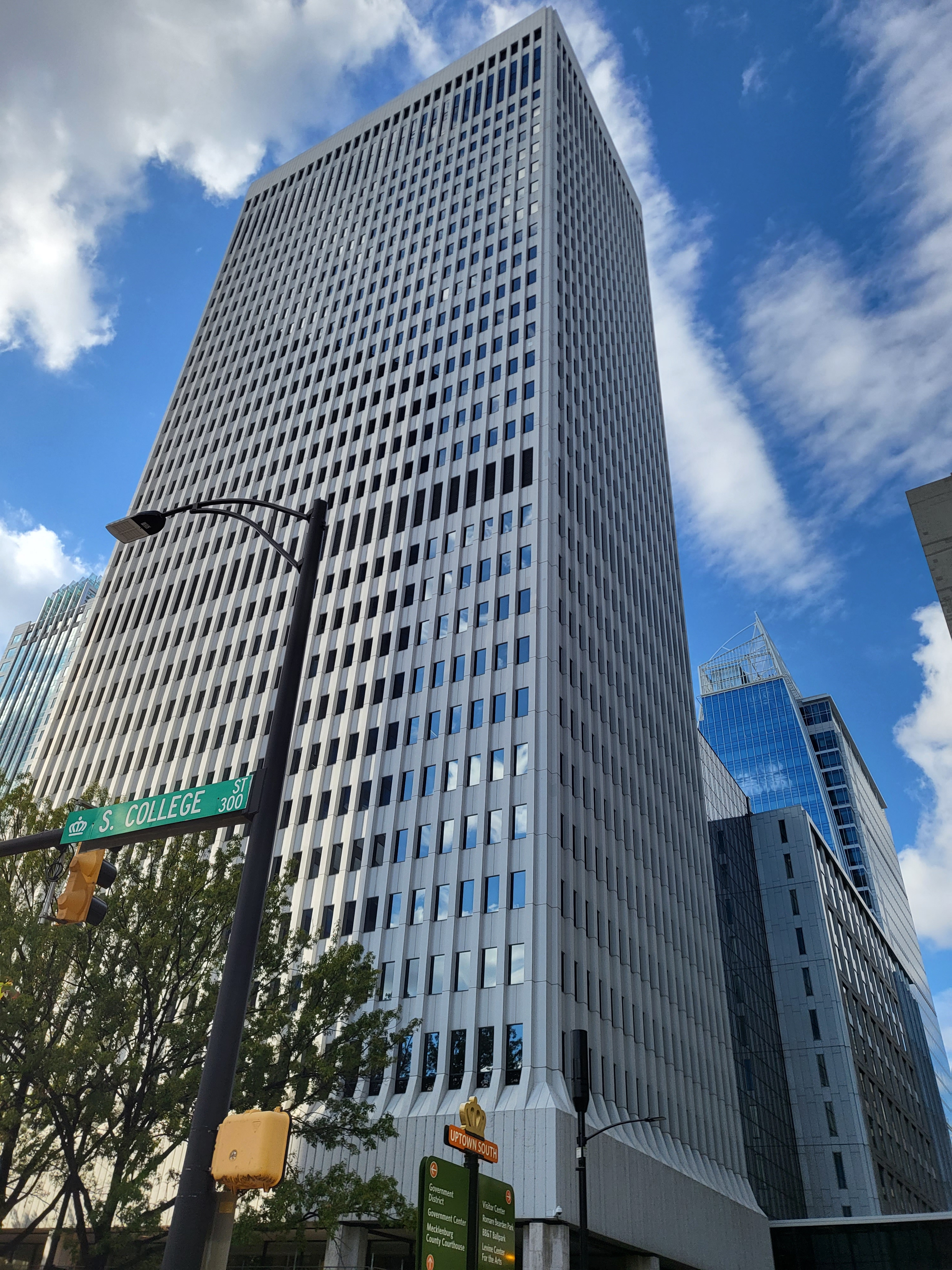
- Interactive map of the 301 South Tryon area

General information
- Status: Completed
- Type: Office
- Architectural style: Modern
- Location: 301 South Tryon Street; Charlotte, North Carolina, United States
- Coordinates: 35.2247°N 80.8447°W
- Construction started: 1968
- Completed: 1971
- Opening: 1971

Height
- Antenna spire: 433 feet (132 m)

Technical details
- Floor count: 32
- Floor area: 758,508 square feet (70,467.7 m^{2})

Other information
- Parking: On site parking garage
- Public transit: 3rd Street/CC

301 South Tryon, formerly Two Wells Fargo Center, is a 433-foot (132 m) high-rise in Charlotte, North Carolina. It was completed in 1971. The building consists of 32 floors, an atrium, plaza, six-story parking garage, and is connected to neighboring buildings via skybridges, as part of the Overstreet Mall.

== History ==
The building was designed by LaBella Associates, formerly known as Pease Engineering and Architecture, with David Julian Moore as the architect on-site functioning as construction administrator. When it was completed, the 32-story building was called Jefferson First Union Tower. It became the tallest building in North Carolina, overtaking the Winston Tower in Winston-Salem. The building has changed names several times as the occupying bank merged with other banks In December 2010, as a result of Wells Fargo's 2008 purchase of Wachovia, the building was renamed Two Wells Fargo Center.

At the time building was built it was one of the bank's main buildings, mostly filled with bank employees. Over the years there have been a few other tenants including Speedway Motorsports leased 20,000 square feet (1,858 m^{2}) in 1998 to house 20 employees, also in 1998 Ruddick Corp., the former owner of Harris Teeter leased space, in 2006 law firm Downer, Walters & Mitchener vacated 6,000 square feet (557 m^{2}) on the 17th floor to move to an office on Morehead St, and CIT Group leased space in the building until 2010. After the merger with Wells Fargo the building along with One Wachovia, Three Wachovia, and 550 South Tryon became the bank's main buildings in Uptown.

In January 2023 Wells Fargo announced it would be exiting 301 South College and Two Wells Fargo Center by the end of 2023. The employees from these two buildings were consolidated into 550 South Tryon and Three Wells Fargo Center. After consolidation Wells Fargo will occupy 95% of 550 South Tryon. The bank will be renovating 21 floors of 550 South Tryon and the food court. Three Wells Fargo Center will have 14 renovated floors over the next two to three years.

In June 2023 the 32-story tower, 12-story building, and the 3.4-acre lot were listed for sale. Real estate firm CBRE was hired to market the buildings. No specific price was released nor was any information about interest in the property discussed. The sale of the property is part of a larger effort by Wells Fargo to reduce its real estate footprint in Uptown. As of August 2023 CBRE is currently in the early of stages of finding potential buyers to convert the buildings to multifamily residential.

In January 2024 two proposals were submitted to Charlotte Center Partners of possible building redevelopment as part of the Reimagining Vintage Office Design competition that showcased how the building could be redesigned. The first proposal was by Gensler it includes converting part of the 32-story tower into a 324-unit residential tower and renovating the 12-story building to be a modern office building. The second proposal by Little Diversified Architectural Consulting would convert the entire building into a residential tower and include ground-floor retail.

On April 23, 2026, Riverside Investment & Development along with Singerman Real Estate purchased the building for $36.5 million. At the time of the sale the assessed value of the property was $204 million. The firms plan to redevelop the property into a possible mixture of commercial, retail, residential and hospitality. Redevelopment is expected to begin in 2027. The building has been renamed 301 South Tryon. A few days after the purchase was announced Riverside Development detailed plans for the $200 million overhaul of the property. The two towers will remain. The 12-story building will be convert to 250,000 square feet (23,226 m^{2}) of office space. The 32-story tower will be converted to 275 multifamily units on the upper levels and a 200 room hotel on the lower floors. The building redevelopment will also include 30,000 square feet (2,787 m^{2}) to 40,000 square feet (3,716 m^{2}) of retail. In August 2026 it was announced that Riverside Development has filed an application with Mecklenburg County Historic Landmark Commission to designate the building as a landmark. If the building receives this designation Riverside would have to get the approval of the Commission for certain exterior changes. However, achieving the designation would allow the owners to defer up to 50% of the taxable assessed value. This would mean with the current assessed value $350,000 could be saved in county property taxes.

== Related buildings ==
The shorter building in the complex was built in 1954 to serve as the headquarters of Union National Bank, later First Union National Bank. The original building was 9 stories; 3 stories were added in the 1960s. The building was known for its 21,000-square-foot (1,951 m^{2}) Charlotte Hornets mural which lasted four years. Wachovia planned to move its 900 employees out of the shorter building by the end of 2003. It was believed to be too outdated to occupy but the decision was made to renovate it instead. The renovation costs were about equal to the cost to rebuild it. Chris Scorsone, the lead designer of the renovation with Little Diversified Architectural Consulting, said, "We looked at this as just another evolution of the building. The important part of the building was the location, not its style. This is an important part of the Wachovia campus." The last renovation had taken place in the 1970s. The new project involved moving some employees temporarily to the BellSouth building and other locations, the bank returned to the building in Spring 2006. In May 2006, it was repainted from beige to gray to complement the renovated color scheme at the neighboring Wachovia Main. On October 12, 2006, the bank's new flagship branch opened on the ground floor. It replaced branches in One and Three Wachovia Center and at 8,500 square feet (790 m^{2}), was one of the bank's largest, using the style of branches in New York City and Dallas.

The Charlotte Masonic Temple at 329 S Tryon St. was already on the corner of South Tryon and Third Street when Union National Bank built the shorter building. It was built in 1915 for $122,750. The building was designed by architect C. C. Hook to be Egyptian-Revival architecture. In 1937 a fire gutted the building and it seemed like a total loss. However, it 1938 it was restored and rededicated. In 1985, First Union bought the Masonic Temple. It was demolished in 1987. The former property is now occupied by Wells Fargo Plaza. The two massive columns of the building façade are now on display on Dave Lyle Blvd. in Rock Hill, SC.

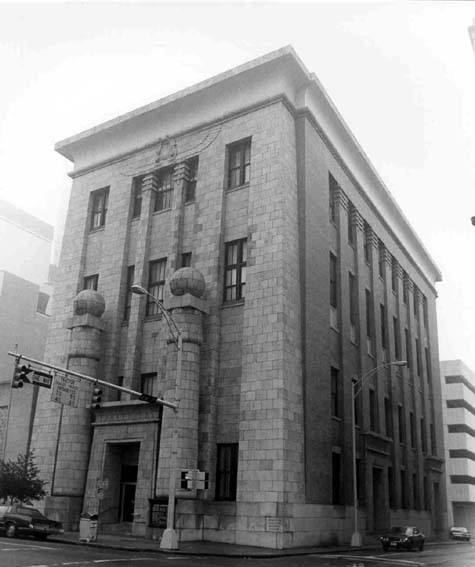
The Masonic Temple lodge that occupied the property when First Union purchased the property.

In 1998 First Union began considering building a 72-story building on the plaza to house additional employees in Uptown. The plan was for the tower to occupy where the 12-story tower currently stands, the atrium, some of the parking deck, and space in the plaza on South Tryon. Even with the construction of the Three First Union Center the company still didn't think they would have enough space. The bank planned to construct a building as grand as Bank of America Corporate Center. Before cancelling the project the bank was considering New York architecture firm Kohn Pedersen Fox as one of the two finalists for designing the building. KPF famously designed Shanghai World Financial Center, which opened in 2008. The other finalist was Atlanta architecture firm Thompson Ventulett Stainback & Associates, which designed 301 South College. The project was tentatively called Four First Union. However, the plans for the new tower were putting on hold indefinitely in September 1999 due to the company's poor performance on the stock market. In 2002 the final renderings of the building were leaked. The renderings showed 100 floors with 80 usable. If the building were built it would have been 40 floors taller than the city's current tallest building, Bank of America Corporate Center.

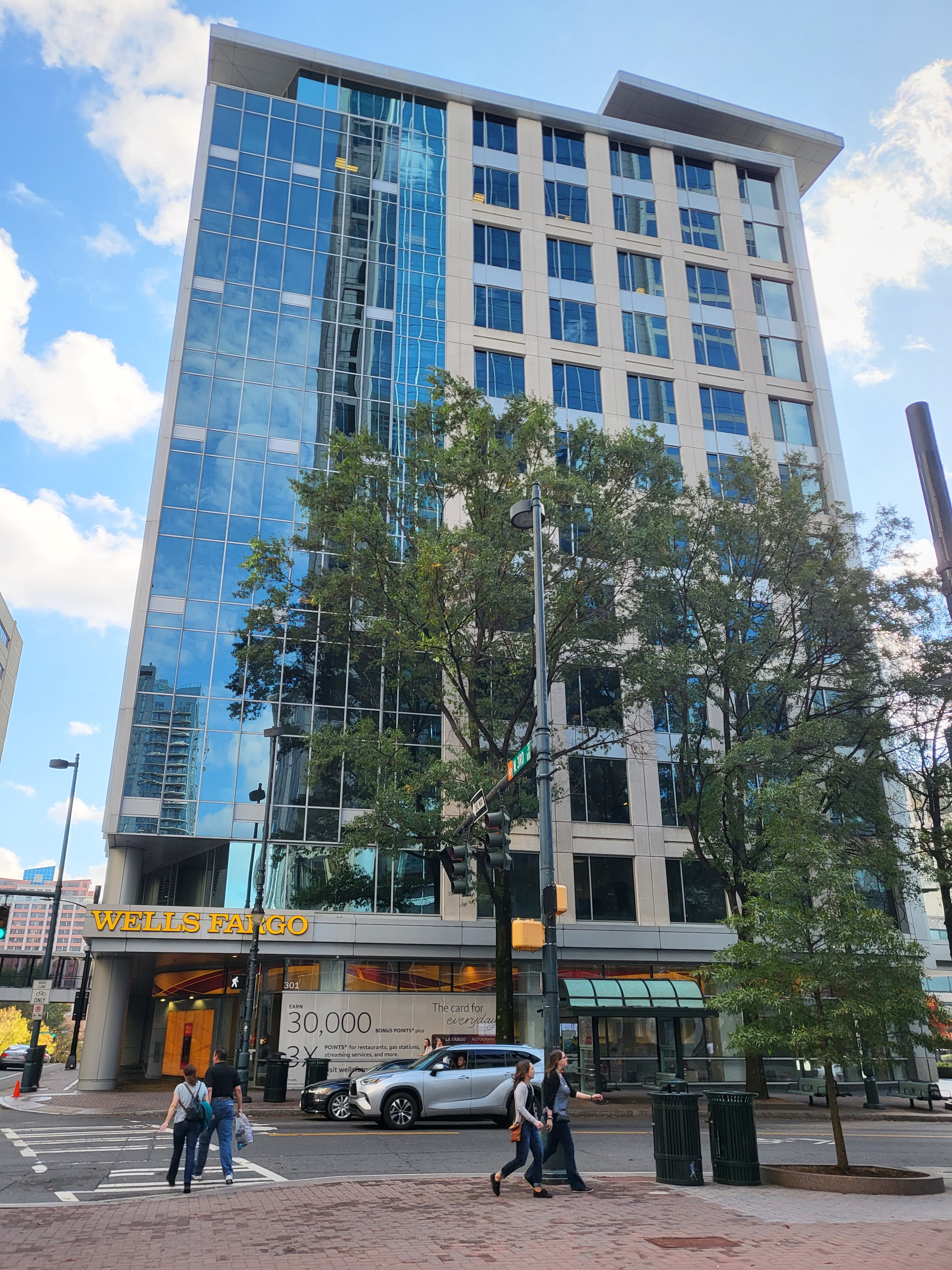
The 12-story building in November 2022

== See also ==
- List of tallest buildings in Charlotte
- List of tallest buildings in North Carolina

Preceded by 200 South Tryon	Tallest Building in Charlotte; 1971—1974; 132 m	Succeeded by Bank of America Plaza
