= 3rd Street/Convention Center station =

Light rail station in Charlotte, North Carolina

3rd St. / Convention Center
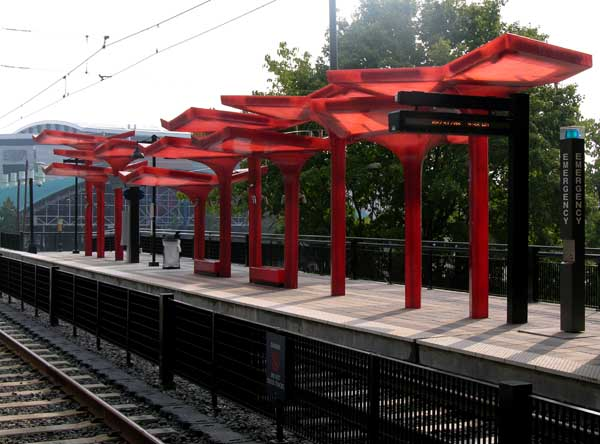
- Jody Pinto shelters on the eastern side.

General information
- Location: 305 East Third Street; Charlotte, North Carolina; United States
- Coordinates: 35°13′25″N 80°50′35″W
- Owner: Charlotte Area Transit Systems
- Platforms: 2 side platforms (in service); 1 side platform (abandoned)
- Tracks: 2

Construction
- Structure type: Elevated
- Cycle facilities: Bicycle racks
- Accessible: yes
- Architect: Ralph Whitehead Associates
- Architectural style: Modern

History
- Opened: June 28, 2004
- Rebuilt: November 24, 2007
- Former names: Convention Center

Services
Preceding station	CATS	Following station
Brooklyn Village toward I-485/South Boulevard	Lynx Blue Line	Charlotte Transportation Center toward UNC Charlotte–Main
Former services
Preceding station	CATS	Following station
Stonewall toward Atherton Mill	Charlotte Trolley	Charlotte Transportation Center/Arena toward 9th Street
Location

3rd Street/Convention Center is a light rail station in Charlotte, North Carolina. The elevated dual side platforms are a stop along the Lynx Blue Line in Uptown Charlotte.

== Location ==
The station is located above 3rd Street and is accessible from Martin Luther King Jr Boulevard, via sidewalk and the Charlotte Rail Trail, and 3rd Street, via stairs and elevator. It is partially covered and adjacent to the Hilton Charlotte Uptown hotel, part of One Wells Fargo Center; and is also adjacent to 300 South Brevard, the Charlotte Convention Center, and the NASCAR Hall of Fame, catercorner at Brevard Street. Other nearby landmarks and popular destinations include: 200 South Tryon, 300 South Tryon, 400 South Tryon, BB&T Center, Bechtler Museum of Modern Art, Charlotte Plaza, Duke Energy Plaza, Johnston Building, Knight Theater, Latta Arcade, Overstreet Mall, Romare Bearden Park, The Green, Two Wells Fargo Center, Three Wells Fargo Center, and Truist Field.

== History ==
The station, originally known as Convention Center, first opened for service on June 28, 2004, for the historic Charlotte Trolley and was located adjacent to the Charlotte Convention Center. Originally with one track active and one platform, it operating for little over 19 months, before closing on February 6, 2006. When the station was reopened on November 24, 2007, it was grouped together with the newly constructed 3rd Street platforms for the LYNX Blue Line and was rechristened collectively as the 3rd Street/Convention Center. Regular service with fare collection commenced on Monday, November 26, 2007. Charlotte Trolley service resumed on April 20, 2008, but was scaled back to weekend and special events in 2009. In 2010, the Charlotte Trolley service was discontinued, leaving the Convention Center platform abandoned.

== Station layout ==
The station consists of two main side platforms, both of which includes a low-level area for heritage streetcars, and is partially covered by the Hilton Charlotte Uptown hotel; other amenities include ticket vending machines, emergency call box, and bicycle racks. A third unused side platform, located adjacent to the Charlotte Convention Center, is for trainspotting and gathering. The station also features several art installations, with its most notable entitled Light Station, by Jody Pinto. The display encompasses 20 illuminated fiberglass canopies that also serve as shelter for users during inclement weather. The canopies range in height from 9 feet (3 m), 11 feet (3 m), and 13 feet (4 m) and are either green or berry in color. Also included is a drinking fountain basin designed to look like dogwood, the North Carolina state flower, by Nancy Blum. Bas-reliefs entitled Gingko, by Alice Adams; and track fencing featuring dogwood leaves, by Shaun Cassidy.
