= 301 South College =

Skyscraper in Charlotte, North Carolina

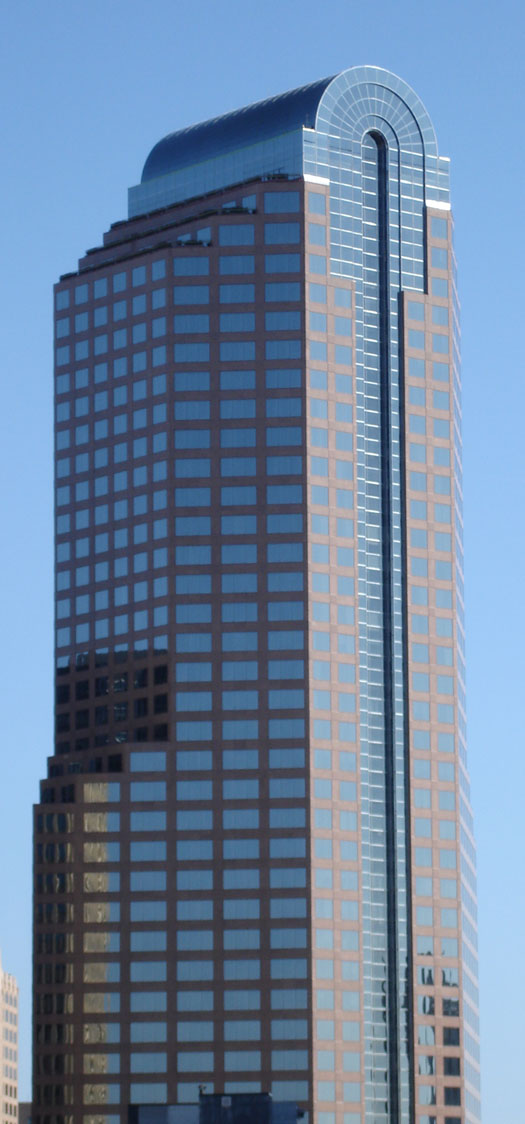
- Former names: One First Union Center (1988–2002); One Wachovia Center (2002–2010); One Wells Fargo Center (2010–2024)

General information
- Type: Office
- Architectural style: Postmodern
- Location: 301 South College Street; Charlotte, North Carolina, United States
- Coordinates: 35.223805°N 80.844616°W
- Construction started: 1985
- Completed: 1988
- Opening: September 14, 1988
- Owner: 301 College Street Center LLC
- Operator: Childress Klein Properties

Height
- Roof: 588 feet (179 m)

Technical details
- Floor count: 42
- Floor area: 994,033 square feet (92,348.7 m^{2})

Design and construction
- Architects: HLM Design, JPJ Architects
- Developer: Childress Klein Properties

Other information
- Parking: On site parking garage
- Public transit: 3rd Street/CC

References
- Emporis, Childress Klein

301 South College is a 588-foot (179 m) skyscraper in Charlotte, North Carolina and was the headquarters for Wells Fargo's east coast division, the bank left the building in early 2024. Their exit made 200,000 square feet (19,000 m^{2}) available. Opening on September 14, 1988, it was the tallest building in North Carolina, until 1992 when it was surpassed by the Bank of America Corporate Center. The building consists of 42 floors, a connected 22-story Hilton Hotel, YMCA, parking garage, plaza, and is connected to 301 South Tryon via skybridge, as part of the Overstreet Mall.

== History ==
In July 1985, Trammell Crow Co. and Norfolk Southern Corp. announced plans for the block between College and Brevard Streets and between 2nd and 3rd Streets. First Union Center, named for its main occupant, would include an 850,000 square feet (79,000 m^{2}) 34-story granite and glass skyscraper called Two First Union Center, which was to be Art Deco and the city's first postmodernist office tower. The project would also include a hotel, two office buildings and a park. Unlike nearby buildings with flat roofs, the JPJ Architects design used a roof where "[t]he top is rounded, a bold arch rising above the setback sections that enliven the principal facade ... this one looks like an old radio". The first office tower was to start construction in December 1985 and be complete in 1987.

By mid-1986, Two First Union Center had been changed to a 42-story building, to be Charlotte's tallest, and by December, when NCNB and Charter Properties announced an even taller building, First Union's new headquarters was called One First Union Center. The $100 million One First Union Center became the city's tallest building on August 21, 1987, with the pouring of concrete for the 41st floor–ending NCNB Plaza's 13-year reign as the tallest building in both Charlotte and the Carolinas. When First Union employees began moving into the new building in February 1988, the name Two First Union Center referred to the bank's previous headquarters on Tryon Street.

As of May 13, 1988, a foundation was in place for the planned hotel, expected to be 19 stories and 250 rooms, but Trammell Crow had not yet submitted plans to the county's building standards department. Omni Hotels was said to be interested in the site. On October 18, 1990, the 22-story, 410-room Omni Charlotte held a ribbon cutting, though only eight floors of rooms were ready and fourteen stories had been completed. Omni president Bill Sheehan called it "probably our finest facility". In 1996, The Yarmouth Group bought the Omni for $33 million and changed it to a Westin. In 1998, Hilton Hotels bought the hotel for about twice that much. The hotel is now Hilton Charlotte Center City.

After First Union's purchase of Wachovia in 2001, and subsequent adoption of Wachovia's name in 2002, One First Union's name changed to One Wachovia Center.

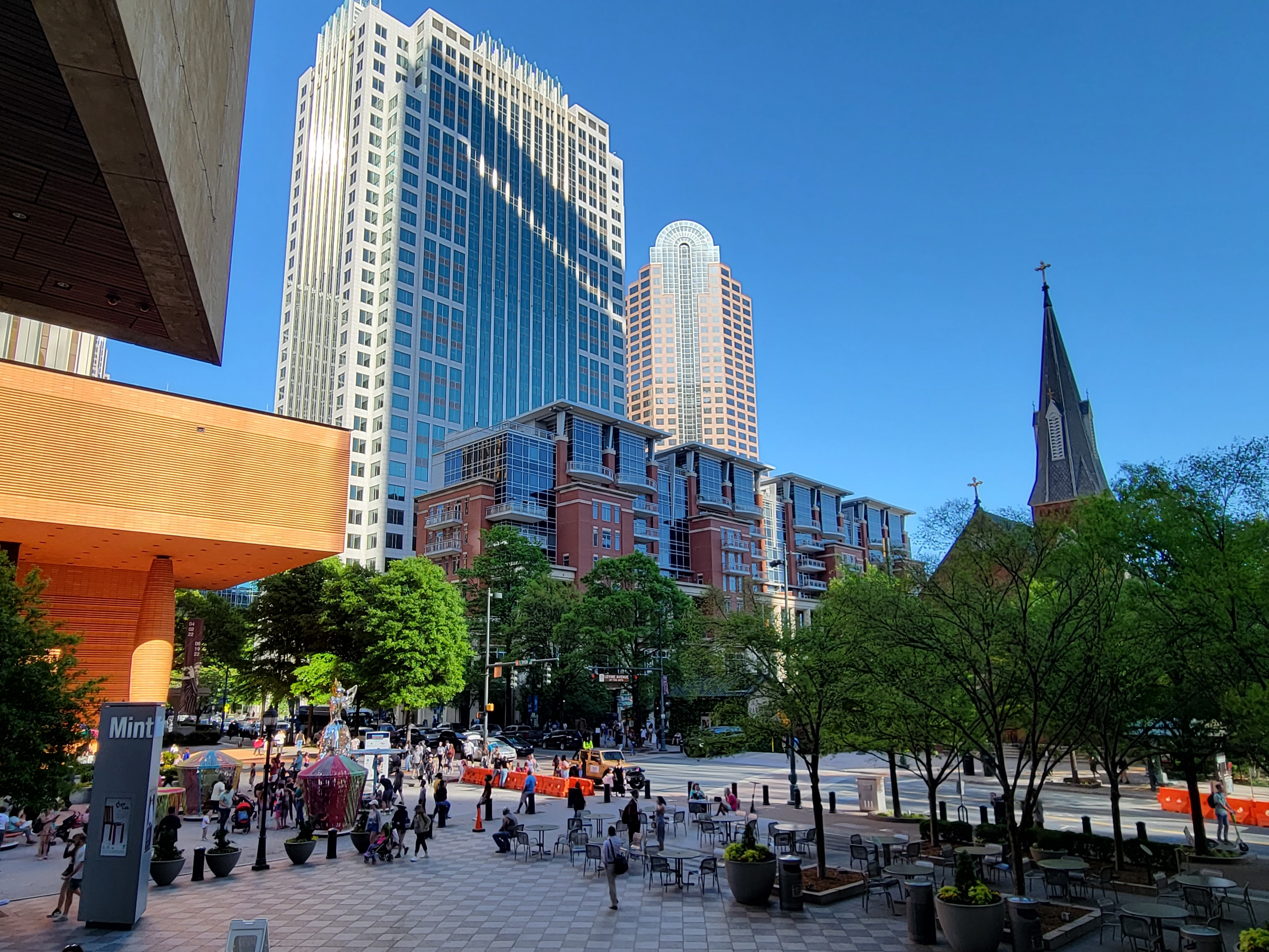
Three Wells Fargo Center (left) and One Wells Fargo Center (back) as seen from the Mint Museum courtyard steps.

In 2007, Wachovia announced that it would be moving its headquarters to the new Wachovia Corporate Center, scheduled for completion in 2010. After Wells Fargo announced its purchase of Wachovia in 2008, Duke Energy announced plans to take more space in the new building. In February 2009, Duke announced it would occupy the 550 South Tryon, formerly the Wachovia Corporate Center, as its corporate headquarters.

In December 2010, the building was renamed to One Wells Fargo Center. It housed the Wells Fargo East Coast Division. On June 14, 2012, Azrieli Group Ltd. of Israel announced it was buying the building for $245 million.

Although Wells Fargo was the largest tenant, with 686,834 square feet (63,809.0 m^{2}), or 70 percent of the space, and the namesake of the building, it is occupied by several large North Carolina businesses and national law firms. Wells Fargo Center also included 301 South Tryon, Three Wells Fargo Center, the Hilton hotel, and a 58 unit condominium complex.

In November 2012 it was announced that 1,500 Wells Fargo Securities employees would be relocated from the building to 550 South Tryon into a new 300,000 square feet (28,000 m^{2}) space. This space in 550 South Tryon was originally intended to be a trading floor when 550 South Tryon was planned to be the new headquarters of Wachovia Corp. before the company was purchased by Wells Fargo.

Starwood Capital Group of Greenwich, Connecticut and Vision Properties of Mountain Lakes, New Jersey announced plans to buy the building in February 2013. The $245 million deal closed in April. The building was sold again in March 2016 for $284 million.

Wells Fargo announced it would exit its lease of the building at the end of 2021. At that time, it was the largest tenant with 500,000 square feet (46,000 m^{2}). The company had been consolidating its Charlotte footprint with leasing the entire 300 South Brevard building, expanding their employee space at the 550 South Tryon following Duke's departure, and relocating additional employees in Three Wells Fargo Center. Wells Fargo's departure left several large blocks of continuous space available which included 224,776 square feet (20,882.4 m^{2}) on floors 7 to 14, 148,469 square feet (13,793.2 m^{2}) on 15 to 21, 59,132 square feet (5,493.5 m^{2}) on 30 to 32 and 47,403 square feet (4,403.9 m^{2}) on the top floors, 40 to 42.

In February 2022 it was announced that Cushman & Wakefield will be handling leasing for the building. The building's landlord, Vision Properties, is almost finished with their $10 million renovations of the building. The renovations include improving the building's lobby, improvements to the outdoor plaza, and converting the top two floors into an amenity center. At the time of the announcement the building had a vacancy of 400,000 square feet (37,000 m^{2}).

In October 2023 the building's owner Vision Properties defaulted on their $157 million loan. At that time the building was 52% occupied. In April 2025 Foundry Commercial took over the building leasing, the firm was hired by Childress Klein, the court appointed receiver. At that time the building was 47% occupied with 525,000 square feet (48,800 m^{2}) space available.

In May 2026 Japanese bank Sumitomo Mitsui Banking Corporation announced it will be leasing 200,000 square feet (19,000 m^{2}) in the building beginning in the fall of 2026. This lease announcement is part of the bank's Charlotte office location announcement in April that the company will create 2,000 in Charlotte creating a second U.S. office. The jobs will be created between 2028 and 2032. The space that the bank is leasing is a sublease from Wells Fargo.

== See also ==
- List of tallest buildings in Charlotte
- List of tallest buildings in North Carolina
- 301 South Tryon
- Three Wells Fargo Center

Preceded by Bank of America Plaza	Tallest Building in Charlotte; 1988—1992; 179 m	Succeeded by Bank of America Corporate Center
