= Charlotte Plaza =

Skyscraper in Charlotte, North Carolina, US

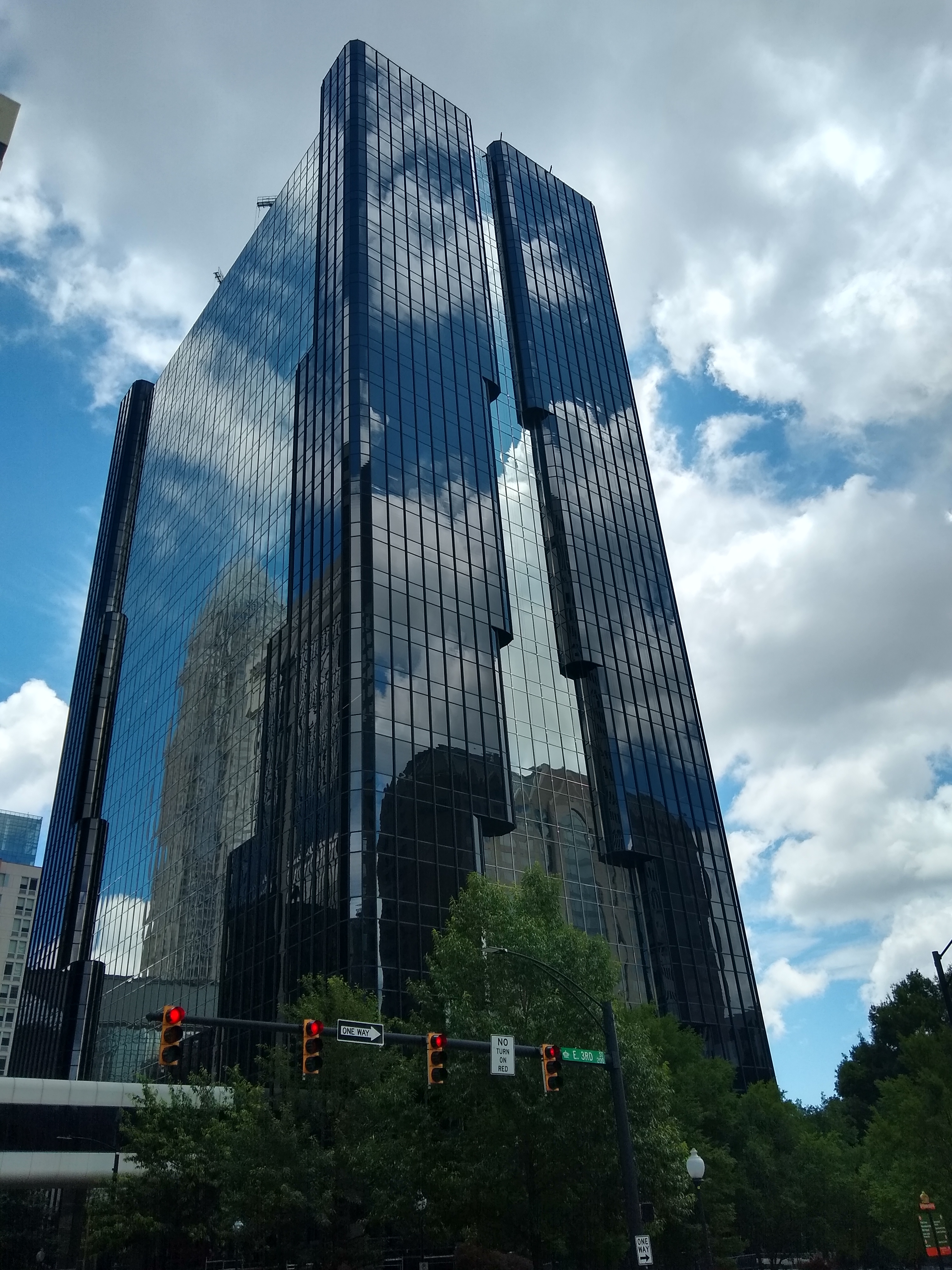
- Interactive map of the Charlotte Plaza area

General information
- Status: Completed
- Type: Office
- Location: 201 S. College St
- Coordinates: 35.225043°N 80.843432°W
- Opening: 1982
- Owner: Rabina Properties, LLC

Height
- Antenna spire: 388 feet (118 m)

Technical details
- Floor count: 27
- Floor area: 644,996 sq ft (59,922.1 m^{2})

Design and construction
- Structural engineer: Nagler Engineers
- Main contractor: McDevitt & Street Company

Other information
- Public transit: 3rd Street/CC

Charlotte Plaza is a 388 feet (118 m) tall skyscraper in Charlotte, North Carolina. It was built in 1982 and has 27 floors. It is the 20th-tallest building in the city. The Class A office building is owned by Rabina Properties, LLC. The ground and second floor are part of the Overstreet Mall, which connects to the neighboring BB&T Center via skybridge.

== See also ==
- List of tallest buildings in Charlotte
- List of tallest buildings in North Carolina
