= Three Wells Fargo Center =

Skyscraper in Charlotte, North Carolina

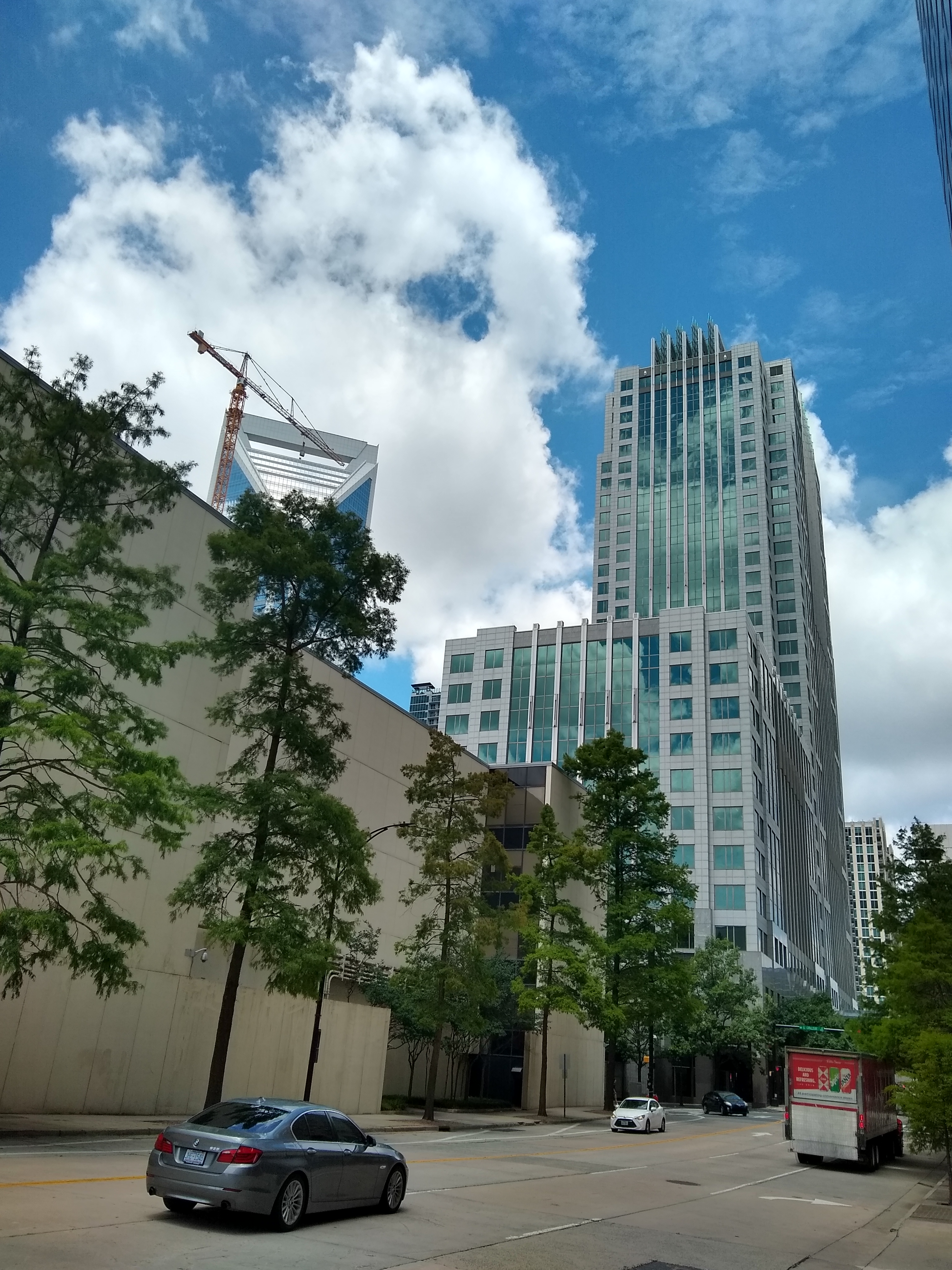

General information
- Status: Completed
- Type: Office building
- Architectural style: Postmodern
- Location: 401 South Tryon Street; Charlotte, North Carolina, United States
- Coordinates: 35.2244°N 80.8463°W
- Construction started: 1997
- Opening: 2000
- Owner: Wells Fargo Bank
- Operator: Childress Klein Properties

Height
- Roof: 450 feet (140 m)

Technical details
- Floor count: 32
- Floor area: 931,046 square feet (86,497.0 m^{2})
- Lifts/elevators: 21

Design and construction
- Architect: TVS Design
- Developer: Childress Klein Properties
- Main contractor: Batson Cook Company

Other information
- Parking: On site parking garage
- Public transit: 3rd Street/CC

Three Wells Fargo Center is a 450-foot (137 m) high rise in Charlotte, North Carolina. Completed in 2000, the building consists of 32 floors with 890,000 square feet (83,000 m^{2}) of office space; it also includes an underground parking garage, an attached 10-story low-rise known as the Ratcliffe on the Green, and connects to 301 South Tryon via skybridge, as part of the Overstreet Mall.

== History ==
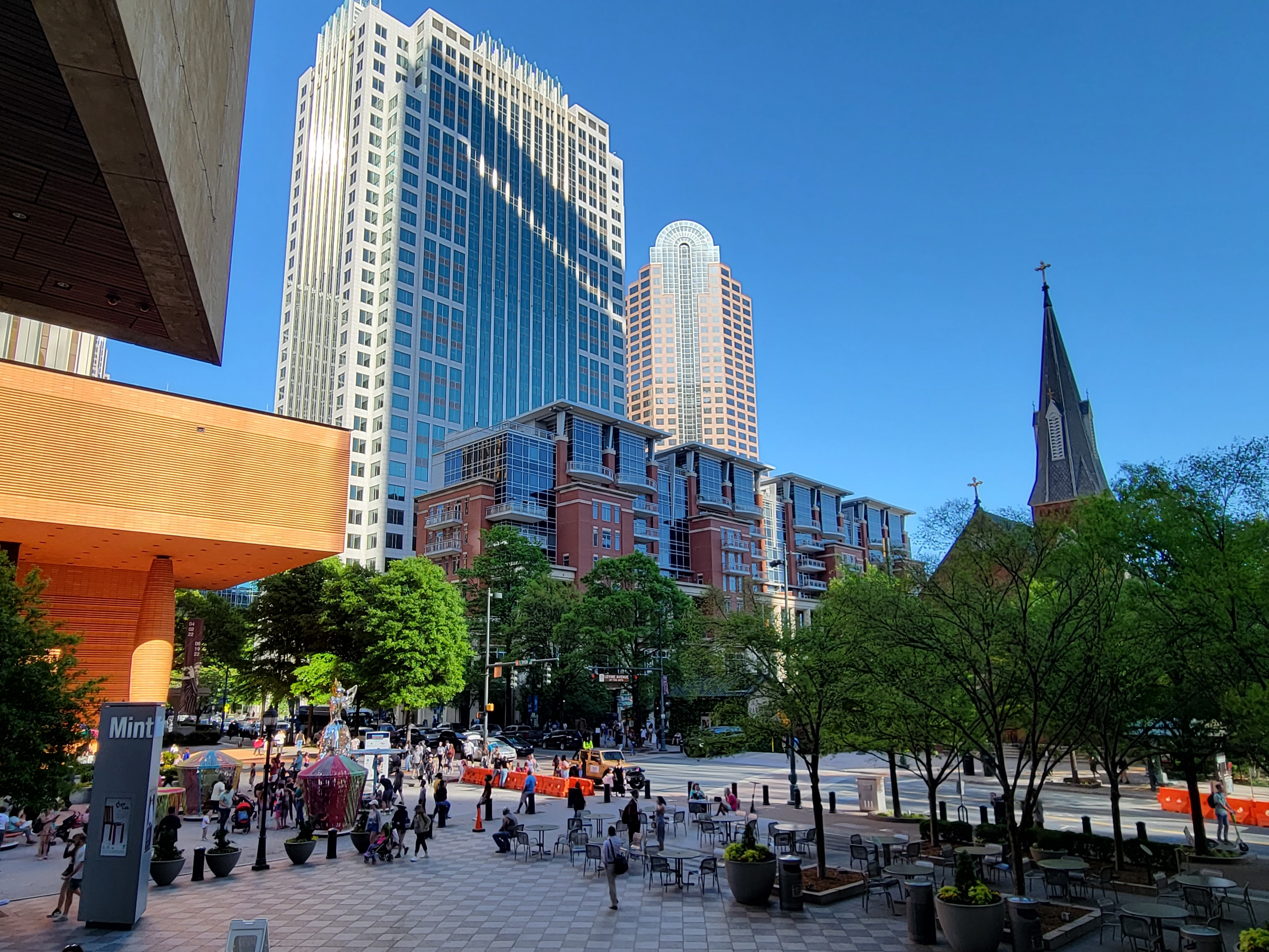
Three Wells Fargo Center (left) and One Wells Fargo Center (back) as seen from the Mint Museum courtyard steps.

Prior to the First Union-Wachovia merger, this building was called Three First Union Center. In December 2010, as a result of Wells Fargo's 2008 purchase of Wachovia, the building was renamed from Three Wachovia Center to Three Wells Fargo Center.

=== Museum ===
A branch of the Wells Fargo History Museum was located in the building, until all but one of the bank's thirteen museums were closed to align with corporate strategy. The museum's exhibits included gold mining in North Carolina, a 19th-century stagecoach, and a model of an 1889 Wachovia Bank branch from Winston-Salem. In 2022, the facility the museum was housed at was donated to the Levine Museum of the New South.

== See also ==
- List of tallest buildings in Charlotte
- List of tallest buildings in North Carolina
- 301 South Tryon
