= 400 South Tryon =

Office skyscraper

Coordinates: 35.224931°N 80.846993°W

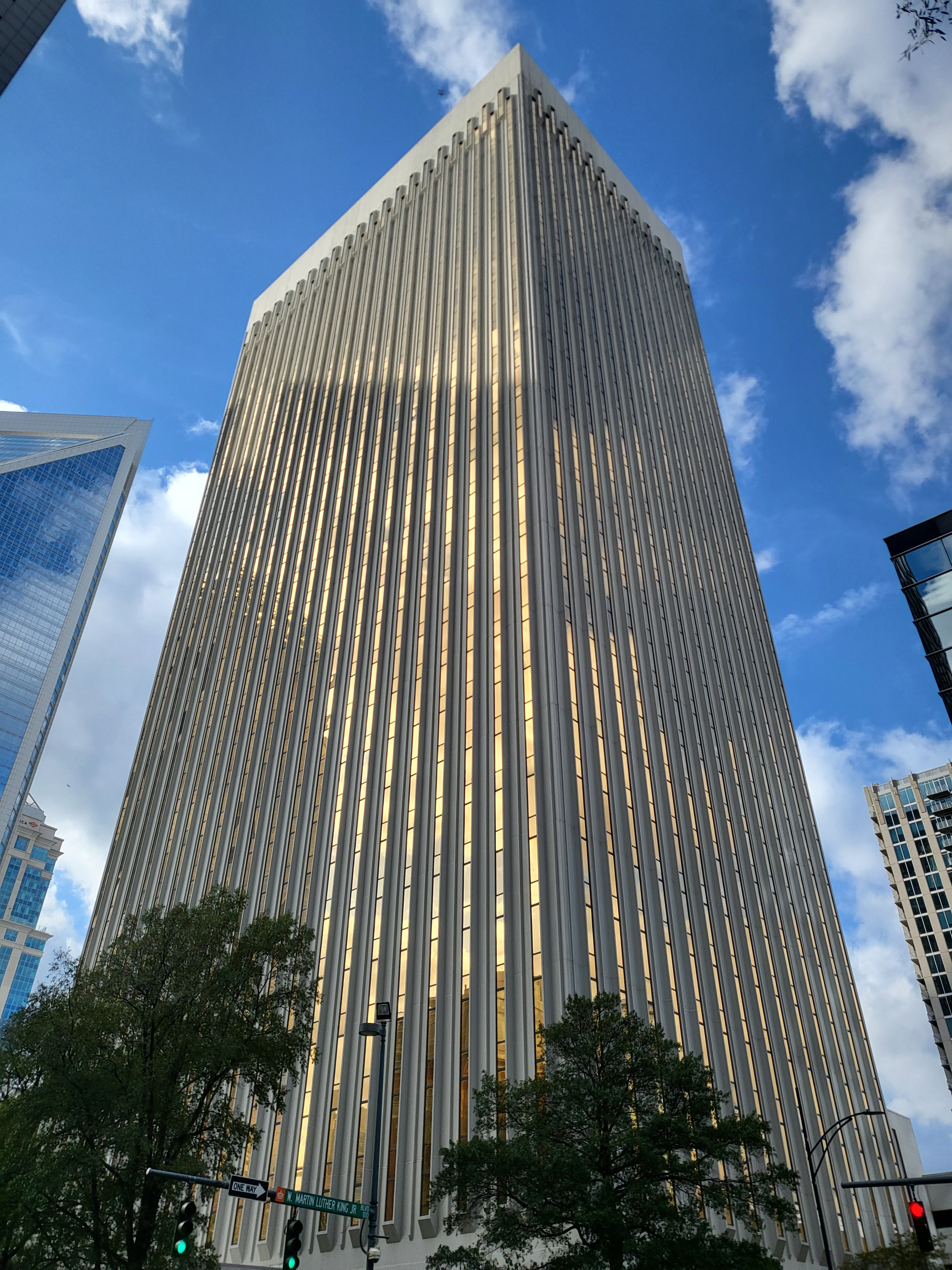
- Interactive map of the 400 South Tryon area

General information
- Status: Completed
- Type: Office
- Location: 400 South Tryon Street, Charlotte, North Carolina
- Opening: 1974
- Owner: 400 South Tryon LP
- Operator: Trinity Partners

Height
- Antenna spire: 420 feet (130 m)

Technical details
- Floor count: 34
- Floor area: 587,000 square feet (54,500 m^{2})
- Lifts/elevators: 16

Design and construction
- Architects: Little and Associates

400 South Tryon, formerly called the Wachovia Center, is a high-rise office building in Charlotte center city, North Carolina. It is the 15th tallest building in the city. Construction of the building began in 1972 and was completed in 1974. Tryon Property Group bought the building in 2018 for $133.5 million. In April 2025 the building was put up for public auction. The only bid was for $36 million, from the lender, listed as 400 South Tryon LP. At the time of the auction the building was 23% occupied.

In April 2026, Spandrel Development, based in New York City, filed a land development construction permit with the city which said the building would be converted to nearly 400 apartments, 200 hotel rooms, and 24,000 square feet of retail.

== See also ==
- List of tallest buildings in Charlotte
- List of tallest buildings in North Carolina
