= John Blakemore =

English photographer and educator (1936–2025)

- Born: 15 July 1936; Coventry, England
- Died: 14 January 2025 (aged 88); Derby, England
- Occupations: Photographer; teacher
- Years active: 1956–2024
- Awards: Honorary Fellowship – Royal Photographic Society; 1998

John Blakemore (15 July 1936 – 14 January 2025) was an English photographer who worked in documentary, landscape, still life and created hand made books. He taught the medium full time from 1970.

Blakemore was the recipient of Arts Council awards, a British Council Travelling Exhibition and in 1992 won the Fox Talbot Award for Photography. He was made an Honorary Fellow of the Royal Photographic Society in 1998. A large part of Blakemore's archive is held at the Library of Birmingham.

== Life and work ==
Blakemore was born 15 July 1936 in Coventry and was educated at the John Gulson School. His grandfather's love of horses and the countryside influenced his taking his first job on a local farm, which he left after a disagreement with the owner on farming methods, before working as a grower in Warwickshire and Shropshire. Self-taught in photography, he discovered the medium when, required to undertake National Service, he signed on with the Royal Air Force as a medical orderly in Tripoli 1954–56, an experience that confirmed his pacifism. He ordered a Kodak Retina IIc from Aden, and started photographing his surroundings in North Africa and learned the basics in the darkroom of the military camp.

Blakemore died after a long illness in Derby, on 14 January 2025, at the age of 88.

== Professional photographer ==
Blakemore's wartime childhood experiences, and seeing Edward Steichen’s The Family of Man exhibition in an edition of Picture Post sent to him in Libya by his mother, were both influential. Steichen's documentary exhibition was shown at London's Royal Festival Hall, Aug 1–30, 1956, and Blakemore regarded it as "a way of showing people what the world was like. I saw photography very much as a possible way of changing society". It inspired him initially on his return home to photograph the people of Coventry and its post-war reconstruction as a freelance 1956–58 with the Black Star photo agency. He meantime worked on personal projects on Hillfields, an area in transition, and the production in Coventry Cathedral of West Side Story. However, magazines that would publish such stories were then diminishing in face of the rise of television.

In 1958 he married and became director of Taylor Brothers Studio in Coventry, and then in a variety of studios including Richard Sadler Studio (1962–3) and Courtaulds of Coventry (1963–68) where he was first employed as a black and white printer before being promoted to a photographer, then over 1968–9 worked at Hilton Studios, London. He remarried in 1970 and worked thenceforth as a freelance again.

== Fine art photography ==
Blakemore had his first solo show, a documentary series Area in Transition at the Coventry College of Art, but after receiving a 1974 grant from the Arts Council of Great Britain he concentrated on his landscapes in the north-west of Scotland, North Wales and Derbyshire; he received further bursaries from the Arts Council in 1976 and 1979.

For his landscapes, Blakemore worked in black-and-white using a large-format 4×5 camera (in 1990 he was reported as using a Micro Precision Products model manufactured between 1941 and 1982) and applied the Zone System and much darkroom work to his prints. Popular Photography records that a technique he used for capturing the feeling of motion in his landscapes involved making multiple exposures, superimposing in-camera, "one or more windswept images over one in which no motion is evident. This permits him maximum control of movement to imply energy."

He also made still life imagery in his home studio, including a series on tulips. Jan Fyfe, acknowledging the influence of his work on hers, notes that "Blakemore’s practice is built around the intimacy found within the sustained exploration of small areas and, for him, the garden is a contained and private landscape, a space between 'nature' and culture"; and quotes his own statement that his work is "based on familiarity [and] on the prolonged and intensive scrutiny of a subject […] or particular location’ and he utilized methods of double exposure as a process of mapping time."

== Educator ==
In the early 1970s Blakemore joined his friend Richard Sadler as a lecturer at Derby College of Art under Bill Gaskins. He was influential on the younger generation who, as Eamonn McCabe reports, "can count themselves lucky: he is a man of immense charm and warmth and he knows the problems his students have to face". Sadler notes that:

Gaskins was leading a course now regarded as initiating a revival of both landscape and creative photography in Britain at that time. The course was simultaneously laying the cornerstone of a new style of photographic education, the effects of which are still being felt today. For John, this meant the sharing of his technical expertise and his creative ideas in the teaching of students. The course required and encouraged both tutors and students to achieve photographic excellence in liaison with cutting edge organisations of the day. These ideals appealed to John, and he worked hard at their achievement. The 1970s saw public support of and interest in photography that led to the establishment of galleries, Arts Council bursaries and the publishing of photographic books.

In 1977, Colin Thomas founded a community project, Aware Photographic Arts, based in Liverpool's Lark Lane, where John Blakemore and others conducted workshops for thousands of disadvantaged participants from young children and unemployed adults to pensioners and exhibited the work in supermarkets and old people's homes, libraries and at festivals. Blakemore, twenty years after its foundation wrote that Aware "not only understands and utilises the democracy of the image, but lives in a democracy based on access for all".

In 1978 Blakemore was featured with Ernst Haas in Bryn Campbell's Exploring Photography III: The Landscape, broadcast on BBC-2 England.

From 1985 he was one of the contributors, with Peter Turner, Fay Godwin and Lewis Baltz, to workshops at The Photographer's Place in Derby, and in 1991 with Godwin, Derry Brabbs and Thomas Joshua Cooper at Inversnaid Lodge near Loch Lomond and the Trossachs. In 1990 he also gave printing demonstrations and workshops to members of the RPS in his own darkroom at 2 Ferrestone Road, Hornsey, and in 1992 presented Master classes at Duckspool Photographers, Somerset, with Paul Hill, Fay Godwin, Martin Parr, Eamonn McCabe, Peter Goldfield, Tom Cooper, Brian Griffin, Roger Mayne, and Sue Davies. Blakemore, in his eighties, was still conducting printing workshops, at The Photo Parlour, Nottingham, in 2019.

Blakemore in 2001 became Emeritus Professor of Photography at the University of Derby.

== Reception ==
Among the earliest reviews of Blakemore's work was Merete Bates' in The Guardian of 13 October 1975, critiquing his show in Impressions Gallery held alongside photojournalism by Bert Hardy:

John Blakemore concentrates on landscape. His photographs are small, personal, intense, and search out poetic images that have particularly human relevance. Wounds of Trees for example, focus on bark goudged and scarred like flesh, on branches gnarled and knotted like rheumatism, on trees bare and dying among surrounding foliage. In Metamorphoses, water freezes and thaws. Even in the more traditional seascape of sunrise over Mawdach Estuary, Blakemore conveys a peculiar, still, sharp melancholy. His failure, if any, does not arise from lack of visison, but from insufficiently pursued images. There is an overall darkness in the prints that almost obscures the content. And even Wounds of Trees could be more decisively, dramatically shot.

Bryn Campbell, reviewing the Creative Camera International Year Book 1976, notes of the portfolio of eleven pictures by Blakemore included beside sets by Lisette Model (12 pics.), Ansel Adams and Markéta Luskačová, that:

in an annual strongly weighted by landscape pictures, it is encouraging that there are none more clearly seen – as Weston would say – nor with more dignity than the very best by John Blakemore.

By 1989, with rise of Postmodernism, when Blakemore was included in Through the Looking Glass at the Barbican Centre, photographer and critic Eamonn McCabe positioned him as a traditionalist:

The present day teachers are well represented in the show and fall into two categories – photographers who work in the traditional sense such as John Blakemore, whose subtle land scapes and pictures of tulips (a current passion) contrast with the conceptual artist Victor Burgin, who is one of the main links between avant-garde art and photography.

Nevertheless, McCabe, in a review two years later, just as digital imaging was becoming viable, makes clear his respect for Blakemore as a "craftsman", with "fingernails stained brown after hours immersed in developer" and accounts for the photographer's resort to still life:

He is fascinated by the complexity of form and a glance at an original print confirms his commitment, and superb printing skills. His early post-photojournalism work was rooted in the landscape, as he enjoyed its beauty. Photography for him has always been about discovery and, with the use of multiple exposures, he has made some of the best-known images of the wild places of England and Wales. But with the erosion of the land by man, he no longer feels free in the wilds and prefers to make his landscapes from debris found in his back garden.

On 30 September 1992, in the Banqueting House of Whitehall Palace, Blakemore was presented by Yousuf Karsh with the UK's then most valuable award, the $10,000 Fox Talbot Prize. The judges commented: "This is the most mature work among the entries. Every single speck on his pictures is there on purpose. There is mystery to it. It's not something that gives itself up to you instantly. It's beautiful". He was nominated for the award by Fay Godwin who explained:

"I have loved John's work for many years, following his progressions from dark to light, stillness to flux, landscape to 'inscape' Not only is he one of the very best teachers in Britain, for me he has been one of the most consistently creative artists working in Britain during the last 20 years. For several years I felt that his work had not been receiving proper recognition. The only publication of his work was a 1977 Arts Council book of his early landscapes. Mainstream publishers were too short-sighted to seize the opportunity, but last year the tiny unfunded gallery, Zelda Cheatle, with huge vision, published a stunning collection of his work, entitled Inscape, sumptuously printed by Jackson Wilson. A major retrospective of John's work was launched in Derby, where he teaches, and is touring the country. The successive themes in John's work are well represented, and the final work submitted for this Prize explores the timeless metaphysical themes of life and death with poetic resonance, great beauty and awesome assurance.

Zelda Cheatle, who from 1989 represented Blakemore, noted that a British lack of acceptance for the medium as art was still prevalent in the mid-90s; when she offered contemporary photographs at the Art 96 fair in Islington, they were handled roughly and the only one she sold was a Blakemore, for £175.

Simon James, in reviewing John Blakemore's Black and White Photography Workshop in 2005 describes its author as...

...one of those rare individuals in British photography whose work is known, and appreciated, across the spectrum of the craft. Whether you talk to advertising or editorial photographers, artists or darkroom specialists, his reputation is held in equal respect. One of the strengths of his imagery lies in its accessibility. It is work which someone entirely new to photography can approach and enjoy, yet it retains a multi-layered sophistication of a kind normally detached from the popular end of photographic practice...

...and notes his "sense of irony" in "going into print with his definitive treatise on black and white photography at the very point when the majority of the photographic world accelerates towards a digital future. Indeed, he alludes to this in both introduction and conclusion."

Harry Nankin places Blakemore amongst those, including "Walter Chappell, William Clift, Wynn Bullock, Frederick Sommer, Sally Mann in the United States; [...] Thomas Joshua Cooper in the UK; and John Cato and Ian Lobb in Australia," who from the mid-1960s used landscape to, in Minor White's words, "express their feelings of being at one with nature”.

== Publications ==
- 1976 John Blakemore c/o Arts Council of Great Britain, London
- 1976 Blakemore, J., & Arnolfini Gallery. (1976). John Blakemore: A portfolio of photographs from the exhibition "Stand before the World." Bristol: Arnolfini Gallery.
- 1976 Portfolio of 11 landscape photographs in Turner, Peter; Osman, Colin (1975), "'Creative Camera' international year book. 1976", Creative Camera International Year Book, Coo Press Ltd; London : Distributed by Gordon Fraser, ISSN 0306-3909
- 1977 John Blakemore. British Image 3. London: Arts Council of Great Britain, 1977. Edited by Barry Lane, introduction by Gerry Badger. ISBN 0-7287-0107-3.
- 1977 British Journal of Photography Annual
- 1978 Catalogue Perspectives on Landscape, Arts Council of Great Britain, London. Introduction by Bill Gaskins
- 1979 Spirit of Place: Photographs in Wales, 1971–78. Welsh Arts Council, 1979. ISBN 0-905171-40-3.
- 1981 Lexikon der Fotografen, Fischer Taschenbuch Verlag GmbH, Frankfurt am Main. Text by Jörg Krichbaum
- 1981 Portfolio Thistles London
- 1981 World Photography, Hamlyn, London. Text by Bryn Campbell
- 1982 Contemporary Photographers, Macmillan, USA
- 1982 Dumont Foto 4, DuMont Buchverlag, Köln
- 1983 Macmillan Biographical Encyclopedia of Photographic Artists & Innovators, Macmillan, New York (USA). Text by Turner Browne & Elaine Paltrow
- 1985 Photography Annual, Popular Photography magazine
- 1987 Blakemore, J., et al. (1987). Print room catalogue: John Blakemore, Manuel Alvarez Bravo, David Buckland, John Davies, Robert Doisneau, Fay Godwin, Bert Hardy, O. Winston Link, Roger Mayne, Graham Smith, Humphrey Spender, Paul Tanqueray. White Dove Press OCLC 81673886
- 1991 Inscape: Photographs by John Blakemore. London: Zelda Cheatle Press, 1991. ISBN 0-9518371-0-9.
- 1994 The Stilled Gaze. London: Zelda Cheatle Press, 1994. ISBN 0-9518371-6-8.
- 2000 Arcana naturae : Von den Geheimnissen der Natur, Haus der Fotografie, 2000
- 2005 John Blakemore's Black and White Photography Workshop. Newton Abbot: David & Charles, 2005. ISBN 0-7153-1720-2 (hardcover), ISBN 0-7153-1721-0 (paperback).
- 2011 John Blakemore Photographs 1955–2010 Stockport: Dewi Lewis, 2011. ISBN 978-1-907893-12-4. With an essay by Jane Fletcher.

== Exhibitions ==
=== Solo ===
- 1964: Area in Transition, Coventry College of Art, Great Britain
- 1965: Girls School, City Architects Gallery, Coventry, Great Britain
- 1966: City Architects Gallery, Coventry, Great Britain
- 1967: Two Photographers, Belgrade Theatre, Coventry, Great Britain
- 1972: Midland Group Gallery, Nottingham, Great Britain
- 1972: Morgan Gallery, Coventry, Great Britain
- 1973: Midland Group Gallery, Nottingham, Great Britain
- 1975: A Vision of Landscape, Impressions Gallery, York, Great Britain
- 1976: John Blakemore: Stand Before The World, An Exhibition of Photographs, Arnolfini Gallery, Bristol
- 1976: The Photographers' Gallery, London (where Blakemore showed alongside David Moore)
- 1978: Michael House School, llkeston, Great Britain
- 1979: Photographic Gallery, Cardiff, Great Britain
- 1980: Lila, The Photographers' Gallery, London, Great Britain
- 1981 Uppermill Gallery, Saddleworth
- 1981: Contrasts Gallery, London, Great Britain
- 1981: Camera Obscura Gallery, Stockholm, Sweden
- 1981: Impressions Gallery, York, Great Britain
- 1990: The Photographers' Gallery, London
- 1991/92: John Blakemore, A Retrospective, Derby Museum and Art Gallery at Beyond Landscape: first Derby Festival of Photography, Derby
- 1991/92 John Blakemore: Inscape, Zelda Cheatle Gallery, London
- 1992: John Blakemore: Beyond Landscape 1971–91, Cambridge Dark Room, Cambridge
- 1992: John Blakemore, Miller Gallery, 138 Spring St., New York
- 1993: John Blakemore: Beyond Landscape 1971–91, retrospective of 100 images at RPS Gallery, Bath, with lecture by Blakemore, 6 Mar 1993
- 1994: The Stilled Gaze, Zelda Cheatle Gallery, London
- 2005: John Blakemore: Tulipa, Hoopers Gallery, London
- 2011: John Blakemore: Photos 1950–2010, Hoopers Gallery, London

=== Group ===
- 1972: Festival, Nottingham, Great Britain
- 1973: Serpentine Photography '73, Serpentine Gallery, London, Great Britain
- 1974: New Photography, Midland Group Gallery, Nottingham
- 1974: 3 Photographers, Galleria II Diaframma, Milano, Italy
- 1989: Through the Looking Glass, Barbican
- 1990: Our Forbidden Land, with Paul Wakefield, Edwin Smith and Fay Godwin, Zelda Cheatle Gallery, London
- 1990: Our Forbidden Land, with Paul Wakefield, Edwin Smith and Fay Godwin, Royal Photographic Society exhibition, Bath
- 1999: The Flower Show, Zelda Cheatle Gallery
- 2000: Fleeting Arcadias with Ray Moore, Wingfield Arts and Music, Eye, Suffolk
- 2016: Sundry Wanderings. The Landscape Photographs of John Blakemore and Paul Hill, James Hyman Gallery, London

== Awards ==
- Arts Council awards
- 1992: Fox Talbot Award for Photography
- 1998: Honorary Fellow of the Royal Photographic Society

== Collections ==
- Arts Council of Great Britain
- Victoria and Albert Museum
- Hyman Collection of British Photography
- Library of Birmingham – Since 2010 a large part of Blakemore's archive has been held here, in particular: Early Documentary Portraits (1986–1988); Landscape Photographs (1970–1981); Still Life Photographs (1980–2004); Tulipmania, Tulipa and other Tulip Studies (1980–2004); The Luminous Garden (1998–2002), earlier expressive colour works (1965–68) and Polaroids (1980s); Hand-made books and portfolios; Portfolios: Z15 (30 × 30), Zelda Cheatle Gallery; John Blakemore – Early Landscapes, Hoopers Gallery, 2004; and work prints, writings, notebooks, preparatory books, letters, catalogues and ephemera.
