= Endia =

Endia or ENDIA may refer to:

- ENDIA or the Environmental Determinants of Islet Autoimmunity, a medical study
- Endia Beal (born 1985), African-American visual artist and educator

== See also ==
- Endian (disambiguation)
- India (disambiguation)
- INDIA or the Indian National Developmental Inclusive Alliance
