= Carlos Estévez (disambiguation) =

Carlos Estévez is the birth name of Charlie Sheen (born 1965), an American actor.

Carlos Estévez may also refer to:

- Carlos Estévez Gazmuri (1870–1955), Chilean politician
- Carlos Estévez (artist) (born 1969), Cuban visual and ceramic artist
- Carlos Estévez (baseball) (born 1992), Dominican baseball player
- Maximiliano Estévez (Carlos Maximiliano Estévez, born 1977), Argentine footballer
