= Margarita Cabrera =

American artist

- Born: 1973 (age 52–53); Monterrey, Mexico
- Known for: soft sculptures, border art

Margarita Cabrera (born 1973) is a Mexican-American artist and activist. As an artist, the objects and activities she produces address issues related to border relations, labor practices and immigration. Her practice spans smaller textile-based soft sculptures to large community-involved public artworks. In 2012 she was a recipient of the Knight Artist in Residence at the McColl Center for Visual Art in Charlotte, North Carolina. Cabrera was also a recipient of the Joan Mitchell Foundation Grant.

== Early life and education ==
Cabrera was born in the city of Monterrey in the state of Nuevo Leon, México. She moved to Salt Lake City, Utah in the United States at around the age of 10, when her family was in search of better opportunities. She describes this period of life as very isolated and would do art in her free time. Her inspiration to become an artist began in her childhood, when she was exposed to the Montessori system of education. In high school her family moved to El Paso where she developed an awareness about immigration and border-related issues. She is now an assistant professor at School of Art at Arizona State University.

Cabrera received a BFA degree in 1997 and an MFA degree in 2001 from Hunter College in New York, New York. Cabrera is an assistant professor in the Herberger Institute for Design and the Arts at Arizona State University.

== Work ==
Brown Blender (2011) by Margarita Cabrera at the Renwick Gallery in Washington, DC in 2022

Cabrera's artistic output includes both contemporary sculpture and public artworks.

Cabrera's soft sculptures are modelled on the shape of common appliances and machines, created from fabric and thread. She has made soft sculptures of coffee makers, bicycles, sewing machines, backpacks, as well as the Hummer and Volkswagen beetle automobiles. Cabrera has stated that these works are intended as an insight into the lives of laborers working in the Mexican appliance factories, or maquiladoras, that produce the real articles just south of the US-Mexico border. In the process of creating her soft sculptures, Cabrera often works with displaced immigrants living on the American side of the border.

Cabrera's soft sculpture project titled Space in Between (2018), is collaborative and reflects the stories of the Latinx immigrant community from Mexico and Central America in the United States who participated in the project's creation through workshops facilitated by Cabrera. The soft sculptures in Space in Between were constructed using fabric of border patrol uniforms that imitate the form of southwestern desert plants reminiscent of border landscapes. These sculptures are embroidered with traditional Otomi embroidery and sewing techniques unique to workshop participant’s cross border experiences.

Cabrera’s sculptural artworks also encompasses different materials, including clay seen in Árbol de La Vida: John Deere Model # 790 (2007), which was inspired by traditional Mexican ceramic craft. This life sized sculpture in the shape of a tractor reflects the U.S. agricultural industry in relation to labor and is covered with individual colorful clay pieces in the form of butterflies, flowers, and birds that Cabrera states, refers to the Mexican "tree of life". The color of clay used in the sculpture is derived from the various regions of Mexico, such as Oaxaca and Puebla, offering visibility to traditional ceramic crafts from their respective regions.

Cabrera's use of community involvement in the production of her soft sculptures has led her to create more engaged public artworks. Since 2010 she has run workshops on the production of art projects in Arizona and Texas, inviting the participation of new immigrants. The corporation Florezca, was established by Cabrera in 2011 and offers opportunities for workshop participants to become shareholders and earn profit through their collaborative artworks.

Cabrera other work includes a permanent public work named Árbol de la Vida: Memorias y Voces de la Tierra which was unveiled in 2019. It is a tree sculpture with a diameter of 80 feet. The branches support 700 hand made clay sculptures made by members of the San Antonio community.

== Public art ==
- Uplift, installed in El Paso, Texas in March 2015. Removed in 2015 by the city of El Paso.
- Árbol de la Vida: Memorias y Voces de la Tierra, installed in San Antonio, Texas in 2019. Made in collaboration with 700 members of local community.

== Collections ==
- Allen Memorial Art Museum
- Smithsonian Museum of American Art
- Museum of Fine Arts Houston
- McNay Museum, San Antonio
- Sweeney Center for Contemporary Art at the University of California, Riverside
- Sun Valley Center for the Arts
- El Museo del Barrio, New York City

== Selected solo and group exhibitions ==
- 2018 A Space In Between, February 10 - June 10, The Wellin Museum of Art, Solo exhibition Clinton New York
- 2022 Blurring Borders, October 6, 2022 – February 5, 2023, The McNay Art Museum, Solo exhibition San Antonio, Texas
- 2023 agriCULTURE: Art Inspired by the Land June 8 –October 1 Boulder Museum of Contemporary Art Group Exhibition, Longmont, Colorado, June 10, 2023–January 7 2024 Longmont Museum Group Exhibition Longmont, Colorado
- 2023 Desert Rider: Dreaming in Motion July 9, 2023 – September 24, 2023 The Denver Art Museum, Group exhibition, Denver, Colorado
