= Jane Hammond =

American painter

- Born: June 27, 1950 (age 74); Bridgeport, Connecticut, U.S.
- Known for: Painting, printmaking
- Website: janehammondartist.com

Jane R. Hammond (born 1950) is an American artist who lives and works in New York City. She was influenced by the late composer John Cage. She collaborated with the poet John Ashbery, making 62 paintings based on titles suggested by Ashbery; she also collaborated with the poet Raphael Rubinstein.

== Background ==
"Language has always been important to Hammond, who was the editor of her high school literary magazine" and studied poetry and biology at Mount Holyoke College before earning her BA in art in 1972. After studying ceramics at Arizona State University, she received her MFA in sculpture from the University of Wisconsin, Madison. In 1977, she moved to New York and began compiling images from instructional or scientific manuals, children's books, books on puppetry and magic, as well as charts on alchemy, animals, religion, and phrenology. From this collection, she culled 276 images that functioned as her image bank for subject matter.

== Early career ==
In 1989, Hammond received her first one-person exhibition at the New York alternative space, Exit Art. Since then Hammond has exhibited in Spain, Sweden, Italy, and the Netherlands.

In 1989, Hammond was invited by Bill Goldston to print at ULAE. After experimenting with monoprints, she turned to a combination of lithography, silkscreen, intaglio, and collage to achieve the complex layering of her trademark images.

In 1993, the Cincinnati Art Museum organized her first museum exhibition.

In June 1993, Hammond asked Ashbery to recommend titles for future paintings. A week later he faxed her 44 titles. By December 1994, she had employed 13 of the titles, "reusing one four times and another twice." In 1994, several of their collaborative paintings were exhibited at Jose Freire Fine Art, New York City, New York; The Freedman Gallery, Albright College, Reading, Pennsylvania and the Orlando Museum of Art, Orlando, Florida.

== Contemporary work ==
In 2003, Hammond became the first woman to create the poster for the French Open tennis tournament; her poster became the cover of Tennis Week magazine. Primarily a painter, Hammond also works with photographs and makes prints. She made prints at Universal Limited Art Editions and at Shark's Ink.

According to a 2002 article in the New York Times, “Ms. Hammond [aims] to make paintings 'as complicated, inconsistent, varied, multifaceted as you are, as I am, as life is.... I think my work deals very directly with the time that we live in,' Ms. Hammond said. 'There's a surfeit of information, increasingly bodiless because of the computer, and I bring to this an interest in how meaning is constructed'.... The best metaphor for the method behind her rollicking, erudite, street-smart, angst-ridden, encyclopedic paintings is writing."

The Times spoke of Hammond's "predilection for systems. For decades it has been her practice to limit all her paintings to mix-and-match selections from a total of 276 found images." Since this article was written, Hammond has moved in new directions; she no longer limits her painting to a body of found images.

Masindi - detail

Many of her works are based on dreams, such as a recent series of works in which butterflies are laid over maps of various countries. She explains her approach to painting thus:

Painting is a cross between high philosophy and cement work. My biggest way of relating to this concept of time and labor is that it is an entry point for reaching the unconscious. The layers of paint have more to do with duration than texture. I see it as a function of time, like the idea of chanting. Certain things can begin to happen because you're with the painting for long periods of time.

Fallen, 2004 Ongoing, High density foam, cotton, muslin, cotton thread, foam core, hand-made cotton rag paper, archival digital inkjet prints on archival paper, acrylic paint, gouache, matt medium, Jade glue, fiberglass strand and sumi ink 9" x 130" x 89" Acquired by the Whitney Museum of American Art, 2006

Hammond's work "Fallen" is an installation acquired by the Whitney Museum of American Art in 2006. The artist has added to the work over many years. Each leaf carries name of a U.S. soldier killed in Iraq. It was exhibited at the FLAG Art Foundation in 2011 and contained 4455 leaves when the exhibited began.

“Jane Hammond: Paper Work” an exhibition which contained all manner of works on paper from 1989 through 2006 traveled with presentations at the Tucson Museum of Art; the Chazen Museum of Art, Madison, WI (formerly the Elvehjem Museum); the Arkansas Arts Center, Little Rock, AR; the Herbert F. Johnson Museum, Cornell University, Ithaca, NY; the Achenbach Foundation at the DeYoung Museum, San Francisco, CA and the Detroit Institute of Art, Detroit, MI. The show was accompanied by a fully illustrated catalogue published by Penn State Press and the Mt. Holyoke College Museum, containing essays by Faye Hirsch and Nancy Princenthal and an interview with the artist by Douglas Dreishspoon. The exhibition was organized and first presented by the Mt. Holyoke College Museum of Art (2006).

On August 11, 2007, Hammond's painting "All Souls (Piedras Negras)" sold for $75,000 at an auction at the Anderson Ranch Arts Center in Colorado.

In 2015 Hammond spoke on a panel about drawing at the CAA conference with artists Hollis Hammonds, Richard Moninski and Elise Engler. She is a Governor for Skowhegan School of Painting and Sculpture where she was a resident in 1997 and faculty in 2005.

In 2019 Hammond was awarded a Guggenheim Fellowship.

Hammond's work is in the collection of the Art Institute of Chicago, the Boise Art Museum, the Metropolitan Museum of Art, the Museum of Modern Art, the National Gallery of Art, and the Whitney Museum of American Art.
