= Deborah Aschheim =

American artist (born 1964)

Deborah G. Aschheim
- Born: 1964
- Education: Brown University (B.A.) University of Washington (M.F.A.)
- Known for: New media, installation art
- Movement: Digital Art
- Website: deborahaschheim.com

Deborah Aschheim (born 1964) is an American new media artist. She has exhibited her work internationally, in the United States and in Europe. She is best known for her exhibition Involuntary Memories. Her work includes video sculptures and focuses on memory, memory loss, and place. She describes her work as an attempt to understand memory from both a personal and emotional perspective. Her work was included in an exhibition at the Suyama Space in Seattle in 2013.

Aschheim was a 2007 Artist-in-Residence at the McColl Center for Art + Innovation in Charlotte, NC.

== Education ==
Aschheim graduated with a B.A. in Anthropology with Honors and Studio Art from Brown University in 1986, and a MFA in Sculpture from the University of Washington in 1990.

== Involuntary Memories ==
Aschheim’s Involuntary Memories is a unique installation that utilizes several different art forms including drawings, sculptures, artifacts, and interviews completed in 2011-2012 at the Orange County Great Park (formerly known as the Marine Corps Air Station El Toro). The piece focuses on the relationships that people who lived during the Richard Nixon/ Vietnam War era now have with the period nearly 40 years later.

For this piece, Aschheim chose to create original works of art in the form of sculptures and drawings gaining inspiration mainly from UC Irvine’s Archives and Special Collections. She then used these creations and added the text from the interviews she conducted in her open studio. The interviews showed both sides of the anti- and pro-war arguments during this era.

There was also a video played by Penny Lane and Brian Frye that showcased a few excerpts from The Silent Majority: Super 8 Home Movies from the Nixon White House. Penny Lane and Brian Frye also produced a video titled “Our Nixon” which used archival footage of home movies by Nixon staffers. Meg Linton also wrote an intro for the exhibition. Indre Viskonta also wrote an essay regarding the piece. Involuntary Memories was an installation piece in Great Park Art Gallery, Orange County Great Park, Irvine, California 2013.
