= Elaine Bernstein Partnow =

Elaine Bernstein Partnow, also known as Elaine Partnow, is a Los Angeles–based author and actor known for her living history portrayals and for her book The Quotable Woman, The First 5,000 Years (2010), a collection of nearly 20,000 quotations by over 5,000 women from 167 nations. First published in 1977 as The Quotable Woman: 1800-1975, it is currently in its sixth edition. Among the 17 published books Partnow has written or co-written are: Speaking with Power, Poise & Ease (2012), The Complete Idiot’s Guide to Your True Age (2009), and The Female Dramatist (1998). She is a featured performing artist with the National Women's History Project. Most recently, Elaine earned six Best Actress Awards from international film festivals for her leading role in the independent feature film Slipaway.

== Acting and writing career ==
Raised in the Los Angeles, California neighborhoods of Boyle Heights and Baldwin Hills, Partnow began acting in school plays as a kid and was cast in her first professional show two weeks after graduating high school. She won Best Actress at the Pasadena Playhouse during a county-wide high school contest. She attended UCLA, where she majored in Theatre Arts and was the youngest person at the time to win Best Actress from the department’s Kap ‘n Bells Honor Society.

She moved to New York after college where she studied for two years with the late German-American actress and drama teacher Uta Hagen at the HB Studio in New York; she also studied there with William Hickey. A member of SAG-AFTRA and AEA, Partnow’s resume includes roles in dozens of stage plays, films, television shows, commercials, and music videos, including supporting roles in three Peter Bogdanovich films. More recently she has had cameo roles in several feature films and a leading role in the prize-winning feature Slipaway.

She left Los Angeles in 1981 to move to New Orleans. There she began doing arts-in-education in the schools, receiving sponsorship from Young Audiences, the Louisiana Division of the Arts and the Arts and Humanities Council of Louisiana. She developed a number of programs for the schools, community centers, and other civic institutions, including “A Visit with Emily Dickinson,” “Hispanic Women Speak,” and “Movers & Shakers: American Women in the Public Arena.” In these presentations Partnow portrays historical figures with monologues prepared from the woman’s own words. With grant funding from the Southeast Disciplinary Fund (Rockefeller and NEA sponsored) in the 1980s, she wrote, produced and performed her own one-woman show, Hear Us Roar, A Woman’s Connection. From New Orleans she moved to Seattle where her programs became popular with the “Inquiring Minds” series sponsored by the Washington Commission for the Humanities. In addition to her nonfiction books and magazine articles, Partnow has written three screenplays and two novels and has had some poetry published.

In the spring of 2014, she began production of an educational video series that grew out of her arts-in-education work and the 39-character repertoire she developed. She and her husband, Turner Browne, ran a successful Kickstarter campaign garnering 188 donors to fund the video series. The Quotable Woman Speaks: Living History Portraits of Amazing Women is now available in its first series, "Global Women Speak”; the six historical figures she portrays are Murasaki Shikibu, Juana Ines de la Cruz, Sarah Winnemucca, Sojourner Truth, Golda Meir, and Benazir Bhutto.

== Quotology career ==
A self-taught “quotologist,” Partnow’s work is cited in Quotology (2009), by Willis Goth Regier, director of the University of Illinois Press. In addition to The Quotable Woman, her other quotation collections include The Little Book of the Spirit (2010), The Complete Idiot’s Guide to Great Quotes for All Occasions (2008), and The Quotable Jewish Woman (2004). For four years she wrote a column featuring women’s quotations, “Women of Wisdom,” on the award-winning website Feminist.com.

In the first edition of The Quotable Woman, Partnow describes how her mother inspired the book that shaped much of her subsequent career. While working as a stage actress in Hollywood, Partnow had come to a crossroads in her life. In 1973, after enduring a succession of illnesses, accidents and tragedies, culminating in the death of her mother, an avid fan of quotation collections, at age 61, Elaine felt lost. One night, while resting on her mother’s bed and contemplating her future, she saw what she later described as a “holographic” image of a book entitled The Quotable Woman; she saw the cover design, the title, and the contents! Finding the experience baffling, she attempted to research the title the next day at UCLA's Research Library. Not only did the book not exist, but there appeared to be no collection of quotations specializing in notable women. Examining the several of her mother's favorite collections back home, she became indignant when she saw how rare it was for a woman to be included. It wasn't long before she came to the realization that she was meant to research and edit such a book, despite having no training or experience for the task. The first edition came out in 1978; the sixth edition in 2010. It is still in print, 32 years later.

== Editing and teaching career ==
As an editor and writing coach, Partnow operates an editorial services business, Editing by Elaine, and has taught adult extension courses on how to get published, public speaking techniques and other subjects. She has also been an acting coach and has taught acting at all levels, including challenged children, and directed teenagers in stage plays.

== Personal ==
She lived in Florida, Louisiana, and Washington state before moving back to the Los Angeles area in 2010. She co-authored The Macmillan Dictionary of Photographic Artists and Innovators in 1983 with Turner Browne, who is the principal videographer and editor for The Quotable Woman Speaks video series.

== Publications ==
Partnow has written 17 books, including:

- The Quotable Woman 1800-1975(1977), Corwin Books, 1st edition ISBN 0894740067
- The Quotable Woman: The First 5,000 Years (2010), Facts on File, Inc., 1038 p. 6th revised edition ISBN 0816077258
- The Female Dramatist (1998), with Lesley Anne Hyatt, Facts on File, 271 p. ISBN 0816030154
- The Little Book of the Spirit (2010), Fall River Press, 176 p ISBN 1435122496
- The Complete Idiot’s Guide to Great Quotes for All Occasions, Alpha, 256 p. ISBN 1592577415
- The Quotable Jewish Woman (2004), Jewish Lights, 496 p. ISBN 1580231934
- Speaking with Power, Poise & Ease (2012), with Susan Partnow, Amazon Digital Services, 238 p. ASIN B008WQ1QQ6
- The Complete Idiot’s Guide to Your True Age (2008), with Judith Partnow Hyman Ph.D., Alpha, 256 p. ISBN 1592578225
- The Macmillan Dictionary of Photographic Artists and Innovators (1984), with Turner Browne, MacMillan Publishing Co., 744 p. 1st edition ISBN 0025175009
