= Robert Lazzarini =

American artist (born 1965)

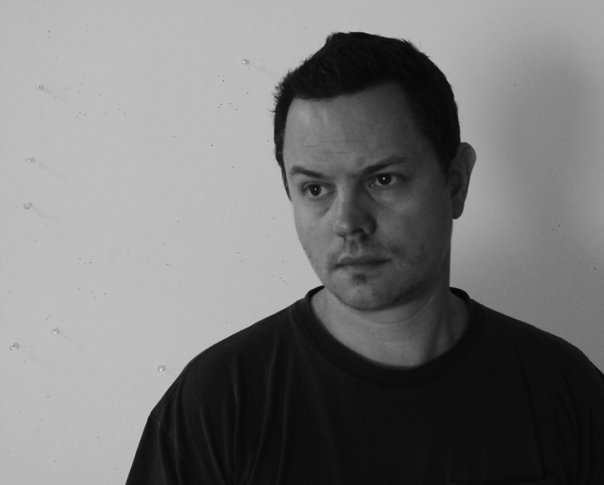
- Robert Lazzarini in his studio, Brooklyn, NY 2010
- Born: September 22, 1965 (age 61); Denville, New Jersey
- Known for: Sculpture
- Website: www.robertlazzarini.com

Robert Lazzarini (born September 22, 1965 in Denville, New Jersey) is an American artist who lives and works in New York City. He has been exhibited nationally and internationally since 1995 and is included in major collections such as the Hirshhorn Museum and Sculpture Garden, Washington, D.C.; the Whitney Museum of American Art, New York; and the Walker Art Center, Minneapolis.

== Introduction ==
Primarily a sculptor, Lazzarini is best known for making common objects that have been subjected to compound distortions which have the effect of confusing visual and haptic space, or rather complicating the space of pictures and the space of things. Lazzarini also alters the physical spaces in which these objects are seen — the "ground" to the object's "figure" — which adds to the "disorienting" effect that the work exerts on its audience. Offering no ideal point of view and so compelling its viewers to walk around the work, Lazzarini's sculptures trace their lineage back to the 1960s, minimalism and to the introduction of phenomenology into the discourse of art. Additionally, all of Lazzarini's sculptures are created out of the same materials as the things on which they are based; for example, the skulls (2001), which Lazzarini first exhibited at the Whitney Museum of American Art, were created out of cast bone.

== Work ==
=== Distortion ===
The compound mathematical distortions that are central to Lazzarini's work are derived using algorithm-based operations such as mappings and translations. There are two primary types of distortions at work in Lazzarini's sculptures: planar and wave. The planar distortions are skews and scale shifts, as well as accelerated and de-accelerated perspectives. The sine-wave distortions are compound projections of intersecting sine waves. Particularly with regard to the planar distortions, the geometries of which are related to the construction of perspectives in two dimensions, there is no single vantage point at which the sculpture can be seen to "resolve" to the configuration of what the artist calls the "normative object" — that is, to the object upon which the sculpture is based as well as the idea of the object that resides in the viewer's mind. Both the planar and the wave distortions make this normative object appear "alien," and so entail the viewer in a process of recognition and familiarization which has been compared to the process of human cognition.

=== Thematic content ===
Though Lazzarini's sculptures court the matter-of-fact to a great extent, this does not mean that they do not bear undercurrents of an often darker thematic content. One of the artist's earliest series of works, the "studio objects" (2000), stand as shorthand representation of the artist's studio with its implications of artistic introspection and, considering the objects' distortions, suggestions of derangement and madness. The skulls, exhibited at the Whitney in 2001, carry a host of allusions to mourning, melancholy, death and memory. The guns, knives, and brass knuckles are more explicitly related to potential acts of violence while Lazzarini's recent print series, blood on wallpaper (2009–2010) conjures the aftermath of such acts.

=== Installations ===
Lazzarini's installation "skulls" was first exhibited in the Whitney Museum of American Art in the 2001 exhibition, "Bitsreams," and brought the artist into wider public visibility. The installation was made up of four sculptural variations based on a specific human skull, each mounted to one wall at eye level in an offset square room measuring fifteen by fifteen feet. Bathed in diffused fluorescent light, the shadows within the room heightened the works “image aspect” where “the walls of the gallery become a kind of uninflected visual field against which the form of each object is defined.” The experience presented a new type of embodied viewing wherein “You feel the space around you begin to ripple, to bubble, to infold, as if it were becoming unstuck from the fixed coordinates of its three-dimensional extension. You soon become disoriented, as this ungluing of space becomes more intense.” The intensification of the works' figure/ground relationships was brought to a new level with the installation of "guns and knives" at the Aldrich Contemporary Art Museum in Ridgefield, Connecticut, which marked the first time that Lazzarini altered the physical space of the gallery to heighten the viewer's sense of disorientation.

=== 2026 Venice Biennale ===
In early September 2025, the United States Department of State, which administers the U.S. presentation at the Venice Biennale, awarded the commission for the 2026 U.S. Pavilion to Robert Lazzarini and the independent curator John Ravenal. Their proposal — developed with the University of South Florida's Contemporary Art Museum as institutional partner and titled History Maker — centered on the representation of American national symbols. After the commission had been awarded, the University of South Florida withdrew as the project's institutional sponsor due to timing and financial concerns. The proposal did not proceed.

== Awards ==
- 2015 Artist-in-Residence at McColl Center for Art + Innovation in Charlotte, NC.
- 2005 New York Foundation for the Arts, Artist's Fellowship, Sculpture
- 2003 American Academy of Arts and Letters Award in Art

== Public collections ==
- Davidson College, Davidson, North Carolina
- Herbert F. Johnson Museum of Art, Cornell University, Ithaca, New York
- Hirshhorn Museum and Sculpture Garden, Washington, D.C.
- Hood Museum of Art, Dartmouth College, Hanover, New Hampshire
- Long Beach Museum of Art, Long Beach, California
- Midwest Museum of American Art, Elkhart, Indiana
- Milwaukee Art Museum, Milwaukee, Wisconsin
- Mint Museum of Art, Charlotte, North Carolina
- The New School, New York, New York
- Newark Museum, Newark, New Jersey
- Saginaw Art Museum, Saginaw, Michigan
- Speed Art Museum, Louisville, Kentucky
- Spencer Museum of Art, University of Kansas, Lawrence, Kansas
- Toledo Museum of Art, Toledo, Ohio
- Utah Museum of Fine Arts, University of Utah, Salt Lake City, Utah
- Virginia Museum of Fine Arts, Richmond, Virginia
- Walker Art Center, Minneapolis, Minnesota
- Wake Forest University, Winston-Salem, North Carolina
- Whitney Museum of American Art, New York, New York
