= Willie Little =

American artist and storyteller

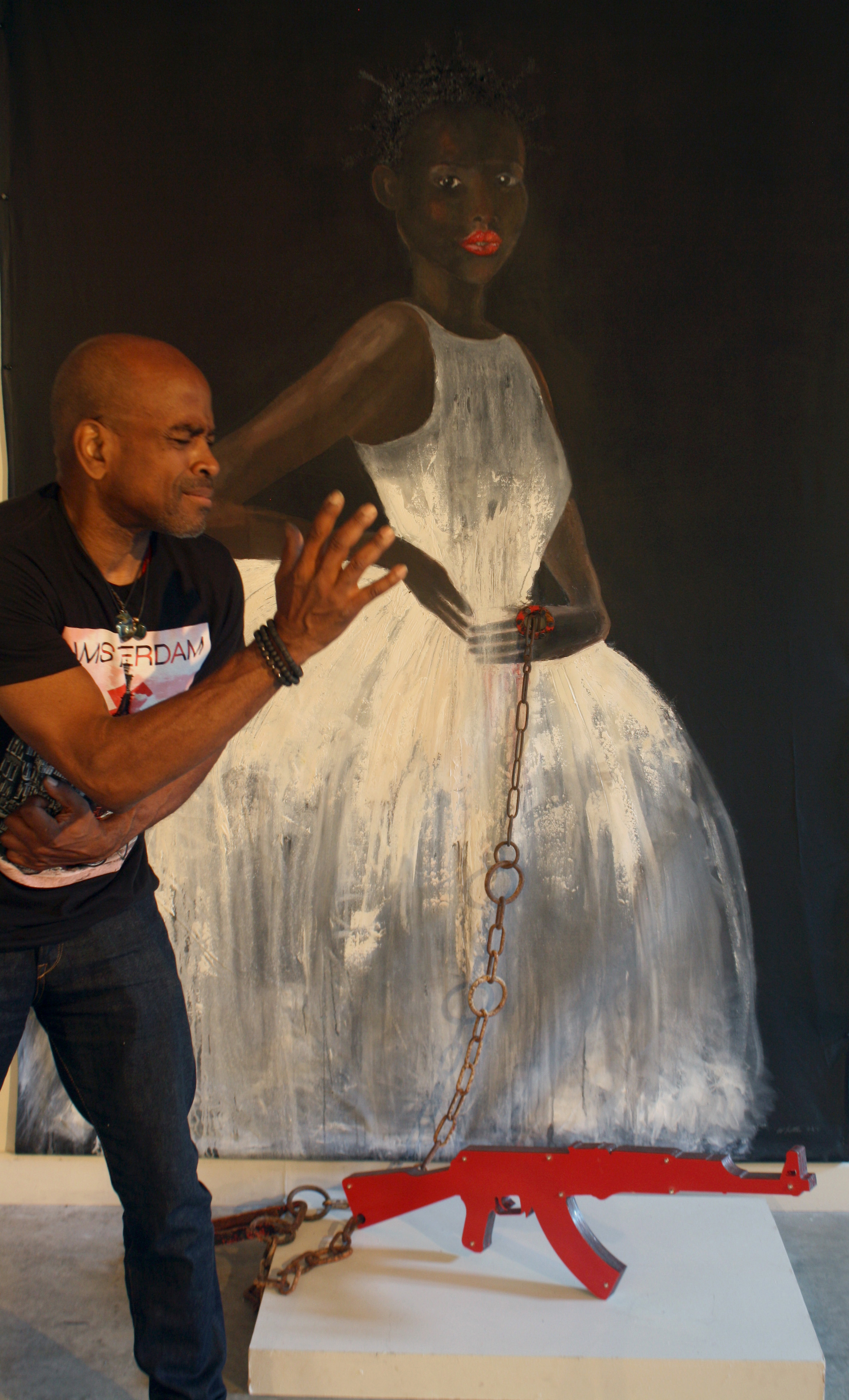
- Artist Willie Little with his installation "American Obsession" at McColl Center for Arts + Innovation in Charlotte, NC, June 11, 2016
- Born: Willie Lee Little; December 25, 1961 (age 64); North Carolina
- Occupation: Artist
- Years active: 1995–present

Willie Little (born December 25, 1961) is a conceptual, multimedia, installation artist and storyteller, whose work is strongly influenced by traditions of rural North Carolina.

== Early life ==
Little was born and grew up on a tobacco farm in Pactolus Township, North Carolina. He carried vibrant childhood memories of life around his parents' grocery store into his artwork. He graduated from University of North Carolina at Chapel Hill with a degree in Communications. Little then lived in Charlotte, N.C., for 18 years. After a 2002 residency at the Headlands Center for the Arts in California, he moved to the San Francisco area where he still lives.

== Career ==
After college, Little received a series of three grants that allowed him to create a nearly life-size multimedia installation in 1995 that depicts the store and bar titled Juke Joint. Little recreated bar patrons using mannequins sculpted over with paper, clay, peat moss and acrylic paint. He also developed an accompanying audio narrative that was played on a jukebox in the exhibit based on recollected banter from the cast of characters who patronized the bar and music from the late '60s . "I witnessed dancing and romancing to the soulful sounds of Clarence Carter, Wilson Pickett and Aretha Franklin--pickled eggs and pickled pig's feet, along with a quick 50 cent shot of gin in a Dixie paper cup," Little said. Juke Joint also traveled to other cities including to the African-American Museum in Dallas. Samella S. Lewis in her book African American Art and Artists wrote, "Juke Joint is a portal through time to a vanished way of life." Establishments like Little's family grocery were a common feature in communities in the South. His parents' store closed in 1980. A smaller version of Juke Joint first opened in 1994 at the Afro-American Cultural Center in Charlotte, N.C. Little then incorporated the original installation and took it to a larger scale.

In 2003, the Juke Joint exhibit was on display at the Smithsonian Institution Arts and Industries Building in Washington, D.C. and is part of the Smithsonian's permanent collection. At the installation's opening Washington Post Art Critic Paul Richard comment that all the authentic details and design rendered the installation lyrical. "'Juke Joint' is like three-dimensional blues, but a grateful blues."

Little's work is often driven by political and social commentary. During a printmaking residency at Caversham Press in Kwa Zulu Natal, South Africa in 2000, Little created a series he called "Baggage," reflecting what he described in an interview as America's baggage: self-righteousness and use of the Bible to justify bigotry. Race and a black-and-white divide are central to some of his works. In 2008, he created an exhibit and show titled In Mixed Company at the Levine Museum of the New South in Charlotte, N.C. The installation is a small room filled with artifacts and memorabilia from white and black worlds with a wall of stinging nettles separating them. Little carefully selected each of the hundreds of eclectic objects he used for its symbolism. In Mixed Company includes an old tin of Premium Crackers, emphasizing the word Crackers, a derogatory term for rural white people; a gilded gold leaf box lined with confederate 20 dollar bills; and carved African walking sticks. Little as the storyteller was part of the show, engaging museum patrons with stories from his childhood, including a tale told by an elderly African American neighbor about "the curse" of nappy hair.

In 2010 with a grant from the prestigious Pollock-Krasner Foundation, Little began to create artistic commentary on racism in the Tea Party movement. In the variety of medium in which he works, sculpting, painting, and multimedia creations, he linked the new Tea Party to what he believes is a modern Ku Klux Klan. For a 2014 exhibit In the Hood at the New Gallery of Modern Art in Charlotte, N.C., he created a 20-foot-tall, walk-in Ku Klux Klan hood. Inside the giant hood was a life-size sculpture of an enslaved South African woman, Sarah Baartman, who'd been forced to appear in London freak shows to display her exceptionally large buttocks. Little made her skirt from 1,000 hand-dipped black teabags. In the Hood also features artifacts of racism surrounded by symbols of hip-hop music, which Little said is a way of linking and antagonizing the KKK with the culture it hates.

Little works in many media, including abstract rust painting, also called oxidation painting, where mediums such as acid and water are applied to a base of such as metal, paper or fabric. Among his rust paintings is a series titled Blue Moon. In a magazine interview, Little said the red rust is reminiscent of North Carolina's red clay soil and rusty tin roofs, and the cerulean blue that appears among abstract forms, its sky. A life-threatening illness in 2013, propelled Little's work in oxidation painting. "During my recovery, these multimedia paintings — beginning with Blood Orange — metaphorically reflected my intense anger, rage, passion and desire to dig myself out from near death with a resilience and determination to gouge and scrape away from the surface — the dark disparity — into the light of life, survival to thrive, give thanks and have gratitude to be alive."

Little's work is included in the prestigious John and Vivian Hewitt Collection of African-American Art. Charlotte's public radio station WFAE mentioned him in an article about artist Heather Hart's project to include more African American artists in Wikipedia.

In June 2016, Little returned to the McColl Center for Art + Innovation in Charlotte, N.C., for an exhibit titled "prompt" created by three alumni artists-in-residence. Little was a resident artist at McColl in 1999. The alumni were given four weeks to create individual installations based on three prompts: the words "divisions and differences" must be a catalyst, the artists must use a material, process or approach new to him or her, and it must have an interactive element with viewers. Little's mixed media installation "American Obsession" examines gun violence, race, and standards of beauty, according to a statement by the artist which accompanied the work. "Lips and backsides, dating back to the Hottentot Venus in the 1800s, once ridiculed and mocked, are now a premium to achieve, speaking to the influence of Black Culture on the world," Little wrote. "Chains, like the one attached to the figure you see here, symbolize enslavement and restriction. Sometimes being constricted can force creative resilience." Gallery guests were invited to engage with the installation by repositioning a toy AK-47 to suggest whether the beautiful woman in the painting is a victim, victor or neither. He tapped into an American obsession with selfies by encouraging viewers to take selfies with the installation and post them at #AmericanObsession.

== Selected exhibitions ==
Little's work has been shown in many group and solo exhibitions.

=== Selected solo exhibitions and performances ===
- 1997: Tubman African American Museum, Macon, Georgia
- 1998: Charles H. Wright Museum of African American History, Detroit, Michigan "Jook Joint"
- 2000: Dallas African-American Museum, Dallas, TX: "Jook Joint"
- 2000: Noel Gallery, Charlotte, North Carolina: "Through the Window into My Grandmother's Garden"
- 2008: The Levine Museum of the New South, Charlotte, NC: "In Mixed Company"
- 2011: Winston-Salem State University, NC: "Jook Joint"
- 2011: Winston-Salem State University, NC: Storytelling with Willie Little
- 2016: The Arts Center of Greenwood, SC: works from an "In the Hood" and "Kinfolk" series.

=== Selected group exhibitions ===
- 2000: Rice/Polak Gallery, Provincetown, MA
- 2001: Arkansas Art Center, Little Rock, AR
- 2001: Lew Allen Contemporary Gallery, Santa Fe, NM
- 2009: California African American Museum, Los Angeles, CA: "In the Courtyard: Beyond the Literal"
- 2016: McColl Center for Art + Innovation, Charlotte, NC: "Prompt"

== Awards ==
- 1994: North Carolina Arts & Science Council, emerging artists grant
- 1996: North Carolina Arts & Science Council, artist project grant
- 1999: Tryon Center for Visual Art, artist residency
- 1999: Cultural Heritage, Artist of the Year
- 2000: Afro-American Cultural Center, Chivas Regal artist-in-residence & commission
- 2000: Kwa Zulu Natal, South Africa, Caversham Press printmaking residency
- 2000: North Carolina Arts & Science Council, creative fellowship
- 2002: Headlands Center for the Arts (Sausalito, California), artist residency
- 2003: North Carolina Arts & Science Council, special grant
- 2006: Pollock-Krasner Foundation grant
- 2010: Pollock-Krasner Foundation grant
