= Ed Osborn =

American sound artist and visual artist

- Born: 1964 (age 61–62); Helsinki, Finland
- Occupation: artist
- Known for: sound art, sound installation
- Website: www.roving.net

Ed Osborn is an American sound artist and visual artist.

== Life ==
Osborn was born in 1964 in Helsinki, Finland. He received a Bachelor of Arts degree from Wesleyan University in 1987, where he studied with Alvin Lucier, and a Master of Fine Arts degree from Mills College in 1993. Osborn lives in Providence, Rhode Island and is an associate professor of art at Brown University.

== Work ==
Osborn is known for his installations that integrate sculpture and sound. Osborn has also worked with video as an art form, and done sound performances. His installation works use objects as diverse as train sets, rubber tubing, wind-up music boxes and fans to create a visual and sound environment. His works for the gallery often have a strong conceptual aspect; in Audio Recordings of Great Works of Art Osborn made recordings of the space surrounding famous works of art, then played back only these sounds in an exhibition. Osborn was a 2000 Artist-in-Residence at the McColl Center for Art + Innovation.

== See also ==
- Sound art
- Installation art
