= McColl Center for Art + Innovation =

Non-profit organisation in the USA

Coordinates: 35.232610°N 80.836020°W

McColl Center
- Abbreviation: McColl Center
- Formation: 1999
- Type: Artist residency
- Purpose: Provide a place where contemporary artists and an engaged public enhance their creative capacity through relevant, diverse, and accessible experiences.
- Headquarters: Charlotte, North Carolina
- President + CEO: Armando Bellmas (interim)
- Website: mccollcenter.org

McColl Center (formerly McColl Center for Art + Innovation) is an artist residency and contemporary art space located at 721 North Tryon Street in Charlotte, North Carolina. Residencies last from two months to eleven months and are available to visual artists as well as creative people in other disciplines. The mission of McColl Center is to encourage collaboration and interaction between artists and the community at large in an immersive atmosphere.

McColl Center is a 501(c)(3) organization.

== Art space ==
Opened in 1999, McColl Center contains five individual artist studios, a large scale sculpture facility, many common-use areas, and more than 5,000 square feet of exhibition space. In addition to studio space, McColl Center provides tools and materials for fiber arts, jewelry making, metal fabrication, printmaking, sculpture, painting, photography, ceramics, digital media and woodworking.

The galleries are open on Fridays and Saturdays (other days of the week by appointment only). Admission is free. Numerous public events include residency openings, exhibitions, and other events for the community and artists to engage.

== History ==
The building housing McColl Center was originally a Presbyterian Church built in 1926. The historic, brick and stone neo-Gothic structure was an active church until 1950 when the church's membership was dissolved. The building stood empty for many years until November 14, 1984, when an accidental fire gutted the interior, leaving only an empty shell. In 1995, Bank of America bought the property intending to establish an artist residency. The bank, with the help of Charlotte's Arts & Science Council, redesigned and rebuilt the interior as a place for artists to live and work. The renovated structure was designed by FMK Architects and was built by Rodgers Builders. It opened on September 16, 1999, as the Tryon Center for Visual Art. Hugh McColl, Jr., former CEO of Bank of America, was the primary patron and in 2001, to honor him, the name was changed to McColl Center for Visual Art. A third name change occurred in 2014 when it became McColl Center for Art + Innovation. In 2021, the organization announced a renewed direction to put artists first and a new visual identity under the name McColl Center.

== Alumni artists-in-residence ==
The McColl Center has served as a working space and studio for over 400 artists including:

- Opal Palmer Adisa
- Deborah Aschheim
- Xenobia Bailey
- Joan Bankemper
- Endia Beal
- Sharif Bey
- Ambreen Butt
- Margarita Cabrera
- Rob Carter
- Nick Cave
- Mel Chin
- Andrea Chung
- Sonya Clark
- Joël Mpah Dooh
- Javier de Frutos
- Carlos Estévez
- Fallen Fruit
- Bill Gaskins
- Mark Steven Greenfield
- Greg Haberny
- Hollis Hammonds
- Michael Harrison
- Heather Hart
- Ralph Helmick
- Joseph Herscher
- Sara Hughes
- Kellie Jones
- Marcia Jones
- Rebecca Kamen
- Sheila Klein
- Alix Lambert
- Robert Lazzarini
- Shaun Leonardo
- Stacy Levy
- Willie Little
- Juan Logan
- Nava Lubelski
- Bradley McCallum
- Beverly McIver
- Aiko Miyanaga
- Franco Mondini-Ruiz
- Liz Nielsen
- Ed Osborn
- Winnie Owens-Hart
- Fahamu Pecou
- Endi E. Poskovic
- Kate Rich
- Erin M. Riley
- Aurora Robson
- Salvatore Scarpitta
- Anthony Schrag
- Dread Scott
- Joyce J. Scott
- Bayeté Ross Smith
- Renee Stout
- Anna Torma
- Mary Tsiongas
- Elizabeth Turk
- Sam Van Aken
- Marion Wilson
- Pamela Z
