= Kate Rich =

Australian artist

- Born: Australia
- Known for: Sound; video art; sports art; administration art

Kate Rich is an Australian-born artist and trader based in Bristol, United Kingdom. Her interdisciplinary practice spans media art, social practice, hospitality, and alternative economies. She is a co-founder of the Bureau of Inverse Technology (BIT), an artist-engineer collective known for works shown at the 1997 Whitney Biennial, and the initiator of Feral Trade, a long-running grocery business and economic experiment trading goods through social networks.

== Career ==
Rich studied in Australia before moving to the United Kingdom in the 1990s. Her work incorporates elements of sound, video, hospitality, and sport art, often exploring the intersection of art and systems of trade or logistics.

== Bureau of Inverse Technology ==
In the mid-1990s Rich co-founded the Bureau of Inverse Technology (BIT) with artist-engineer Natalie Jeremijenko. BIT produced technologically driven works such as BIT Plane (1997), in which a remote-controlled aircraft equipped with a video camera flew over Silicon Valley, and Suicide Box, a motion-detecting device installed near San Francisco’s Golden Gate Bridge. Works by BIT were included in the 1997 Whitney Biennial.

== Feral Trade and related projects ==
In 2003 Rich initiated Feral Trade, a grocery business using personal networks to transport goods such as coffee, olive oil, and chocolate across borders. The project has been described as “willfully wild (as in pigeon) rather than romantically wild (as in wolf).” Feral Trade has been exhibited internationally, including at Furtherfield in London and the Łódź Art Museum’s *Making Use* exhibition.

She also co-created Cube Cola with Kayle Brandon, an open-source cola recipe and laboratory developed at the Cube Microplex in Bristol.

In 2020 she launched the Feral MBA, an alternative business training programme for artists and others seeking to re-imagine enterprise.

== Residencies and fellowships ==
Rich was Artist-in-Residence at the McColl Center for Visual Art in Charlotte, North Carolina, in 2002. In 2007 she received the Netarts.org Grand Prize from the Machida City Museum of Graphic Arts, Tokyo. From 2008 to 2012 she collaborated with FoAM on *Food, Disaster, Culture*, a cultural laboratory in European cities. In 2024 she became an Administrative Fellow at Hangar, Barcelona, and in 2024–2027 she holds a Marie Skłodowska-Curie Postdoctoral Fellowship with Brave New Alps in Italy, researching “radical administration.”

== Recognition ==
Rich’s projects have been discussed in international media and scholarly contexts, including The Guardian, Wired, Rhizome, Bidoun, and academic journals such as Unlikely and Places.

== Selected writings ==
- (2024) "None of this experiment is evident" with Femke Snelting, DOI: 10.70934/0yxnhx
- (2023) “The Thorny Question of Art and Economy,” in The World We Want: Dystopian & Utopian Impulses in Art Making (Intellect Books), with Nancy Mauro-Flude. University of Chicago Press, ISBN 9781835951767
- (2022) “The Feral MBA”. Published Doctoral Thesis.
- (2020) RADMIN Reader, co-edited with Angela Piccini. ISBN 9781527293304
- (2014) “Feral Trade: taking back markets for people and the planet,” with Katherine Gibson, in Unlikely Journal for Creative Arts.
- (2013) "Feral Trade" in Disrupting Business: Art & Activism in Times of Financial Crisis, Tatiana Bazzichelli & Geoff Cox (Eds), Autonomedia
