= Mark Steven Greenfield =

African American visual artist

Mark Steven Greenfield (born 1951, Los Angeles, California) is an African-American visual artist.

== Early life and education ==
The son of a military man, Mark Steven Greenfield spent his early childhood in Germany and Taiwan. As an only child, Greenfield describes the challenges of being alone, "[a]s far as diversity," he says, "I was about it." Overseas, Greenfield developed a sense of uniqueness that he later describes as "transforming itself into strength in the face of adversity" when he returned to Los Angeles in 1960 at the age of ten.

Reintegration into Los Angeles's African American culture proved difficult for many reasons, namely, because while Greenfield was overseas he had been spared the personal humiliation of racism. Returning at the height of the civil rights conflicts, Greenfield became newly acquainted with the experiences facing African American youth. It was also during this time that the artist's parents divorced, his father moving to Florida and his mother now faced with the challenges of having to support the two of them on her own.

As a child Greenfield attended an art program at the Otis Art Institute, sponsored by the Golden State Mutual Life Insurance Company, where he studied under Charles White and John Riddle. In high school Greenfield had shown some talent and interest in art. However, as a teenager coming of age in South Central Los Angeles, the artist often found himself in trouble. A favorite teacher, whom Greenfield credits with saving his life once remarked "you could be a pretty good artist if you live that long."

Greenfield's mother relocated to New York when he was eighteen, and the artist describes having only three options: Vietnam, college, or living with his grandmother. Having already developed a strong political voice against a war Greenfield describes as "unjust," Vietnam was quickly ruled out. College was his choice by default as "living with grandma would have been almost as bad as going to Vietnam," the artist remarks in an interview. Relying heavily on student loans, he attained his bachelor's degree in Art Education in 1973 from California State University, Long Beach. He attained his Master's of Fine Arts from California State University, Los Angeles in 1987. During college, Greenfield turned his energies and focus to African American Studies and immersed himself in campus life and activism.

== Art and creative work ==
By 1969, relatively early in the artist's career, Greenfield had embraced art as a means of self-expression-- "I felt that many times with my father being so dominating, I had no chance to express my feelings...doing my art gave me a chance to express who I was." Despite defining himself as "an artist first," he has never rejected the label "African American artist." In fact, Greenfield has always "accepted it with pride." He remembers:

"As an undergraduate I was studying Art History and I was not thinking that this is 'white art.' I realized that these artists are just expressing things that are important to their experience. So if I choose to express things that are important to my experience why do I have to be penalized because it is 'ethnic'?"

Some work to follow this moment in school took him in the direction of genealogy. Specifically, The Banner Series (date) was structured based on banners that Greenfield has seen as a child in Taiwan, where banners with images of the deceased are carried during funeral processions. The images on this work are people from Greenfield's own family; however, the artist describes the message as a broader one:

"My genealogical research made me realize that all human families have a lot in common. In every family there is someone we are ashamed of, someone we are proud of, someone who is a failure and someone who is a great success."

In 2000, Greenfield dedicated himself to another important project, that of working through the history and cultural remnants of blackface minstrelsy. The point of this he said was to provoke dialogue. "It's important for a younger generation to know what happened. Now younger artists can take it up if they need to. I just hope I've helped create a coherent context," said Mark Steven Greenfield in a November 2014 L.A. Times interview. His Blackatcha (date) exhibitions exposed this painful legacy in American cultural memory. "It is my hope that the work might offer a glimpse into the origins of some conscious and subconscious contemporary thinking with regard to race, color, and gender. If you are discomforted by what you see, I invite you to examine those feelings, for out of this examination with come enlightenment...My work entreats the viewer to look at these images, while at the same time looking through them, to discover an alternative context."

His minstrelsy characters instead of displaying looks of happiness often display looks of anger and rage.

Greenfield was a 2016 Artist-in-Residence at the McColl Center for Art + Innovation in Charlotte, NC. After a residency in Brazil in 2014 the focus of his work is now turning towards the topic of contemporary eguns.

== Other work ==
Throughout his career, Greenfield has had affiliations with no less than 25 associations and public service agencies. He has held the varied and esteemed titles of President; juror; instructor and mentor. He was the executive director of the Los Angeles Municipal Art Gallery for xx years. Greenfield describes his path to success as not paved with years spent in ivory towers, but with hard work at the grassroots level, "a commitment to better himself through bettering others."

Perhaps shockingly, Greenfield describes his best job as working as a janitor. "I worked with a friend cleaning office buildings at night. The job gave me peace and quiet-- it was a great time to think about your art work-- it was mindless work."

In 1986, Greenfield became the Founding Member of the Black Creative Professionals Association. In 1992, he served as President of the California African American Genealogical Society. Greenfield was on the Board of the Watts Village Theater Company; and he later worked as Art Center Director at the Watts Towers Arts Center as part of the Cultural Affairs Department of the City of Los Angeles. He also served on the Board of the Korean American Museum, was the vice president of the Los Angeles Art Association, and was on the board of the Downtown Arts Development Association.

== Personal life ==
Raised a Catholic (a theme that influences much of his artistic work), Greenfield lapsed as an adolescent and later became involved with Eastern religions.

== Exhibitions ==
Sep, 2014 Lookin’ Back in Front of Me: Selected Works of Mark Steven Greenfield, 1974–2014 California African American Museum

Sep, 2014 EAT.DRINK.ART - A Kaleidoscope of the Senses Los Angeles Municipal Art Gallery at Barnsdall Park (LAMAG)

Mar, 2014 RISE: Love. Revolution. Black Panther Party. Closing Reception Art Share L.A.

Feb, 2014 RISE: Love, Revolution, the Black Panthers Art Share L.A.

Sep, 2013 Offramp Gallery - Fifth Anniversary Showcase Offramp Gallery

Jun, 2013 2013 Monster Drawing Rally Armory Center for the Arts

Apr, 2013 Mark Steven Greenfield: Closing Reception and Artist Talk Offramp Gallery

Mar, 2013 Wine Tasting with Mark Steven Greenfield and Colorado Wine Company Offramp Gallery

Mar, 2013 ONE SHOT : [SPACES] The Loft at Liz's

Mar, 2013 Writing Down the Bones / An Alchemy of Arts & Letters California African American Museum

Mar, 2013 Animalicious Offramp Gallery 2013

Mar, 2013 Wine Tasting with Mark Steven Greenfield and Colorado Wine Cmmpany Offramp Gallery

Mar, 2013 Mark Steven Greenfield: Animalicious Offramp Gallery

Feb, 2013 Democracy in Art and Life Palos Verdes Art Center

Jan, 2013 PRINT: DEMOCRACY IN ART AND LIFE Palos Verdes Art Center

Nov, 2012 Letters From Los Angeles: Text in Southern California Art Jack Rutberg Fine Arts

Nov, 2012 Underexposed Center for the Arts, Eagle Rock

Nov, 2012 From Bukowski to St. John the Evangelist Avenue 50 Studio

Oct, 2012 2012 C.O.L.A. Exhibition: Conversations with the Artists (October 19) Los Angeles Municipal Art Gallery at Barnsdall Park (LAMAG)

Oct, 2012 Go Tell it on the Mountain California African American Museum

Sep, 2012 2012 C.O.L.A. Individual Artist Fellowships Exhibition Los Angeles Municipal Art Gallery at Barnsdall Park (LAMAG)

Sep, 2012 Sea of Exchange: Ireland - Los Angeles LA Print Space @ Pacific Design Center

Apr, 2012 18th Street Arts Center's ArtNight 18th Street Arts Center

Apr, 2012 Visions from the New California 18th Street Arts Center

May, 2011 Doo-Dahz Offramp Gallery 2011

May, 2011 Doo-Dahz Offramp Gallery

Dec, 2010 Holiday Season Art Show LA Artcore Brewery Annex

Nov, 2010 inSCRIPTion: ... text ... image ... action ... Cerritos College Art Gallery

Nov, 2010 LATITUDE 34-40 Art 1307 Villa Di Donato

Sep, 2010 Social/Political Content José Drudis-Biada Art Gallery

Apr, 2010 4TH INTERNATIONAL EXCHANGE SHOW WITH THAILAND LA Artcore Union Center for the Arts

Mar, 2010 4TH INTERNATIONAL EXCHANGE SHOW WITH THAILAND LA Artcore Brewery Annex

Jan, 2010 Spirituality in Art Avenue 50 Studio

Dec, 2009 Testimonies Two - Contemporary Ex-Votos Avenue 50 Studio

Dec, 2009 “Testimonies Two - Contemporary Ex-Votos” Avenue 50 Studio

Nov, 2009 Monster Drawing Rally Center for the Arts, Eagle Rock

Aug, 2009 A Collectors Tardeada Avenue 50 Studio

Jul, 2009 Othello's Ghost Offramp Gallery

May, 2009 COLA 2009 Individual Artist Fellowships Exhibition Los Angeles Municipal Art Gallery at Barnsdall Park (LAMAG)

Apr, 2009 "WEST SOUTHWEST: ABQ - LA EXCHANGE" LA Artcore Brewery Annex

Apr, 2009 "WEST SOUTHWEST: ABQ - LA EXCHANGE" LA Artcore Union Center for the Arts

Feb, 2009 Whim-Wham Los Angeles Municipal Art Gallery at Barnsdall Park (LAMAG)

Aug, 2008 Mammygraphs Wignall Museum of Contemporary Art

Mar, 2008 Film Screening and Discussion Sweeney Art Gallery

Jan, 2008 Incognegro: New Works by Mark Steven Greenfield Sweeney Art Gallery

Sep, 2007 Incognegro 18th Street Arts Center

Jul, 2001 PIXX Watts Towers Arts Center
