= Hollis Hammonds =

American artist and academic

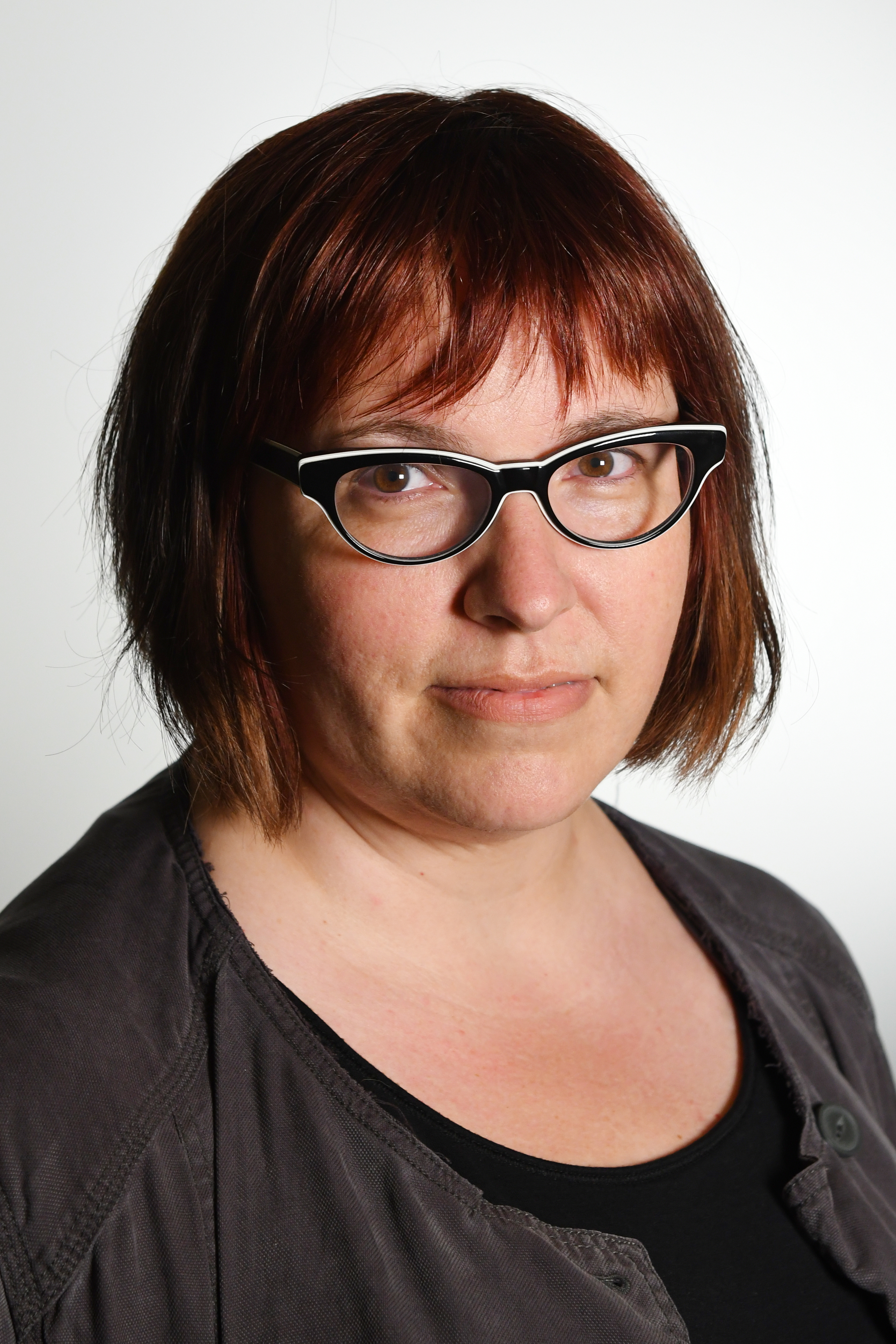
- artist, Hollis Hammonds
- Born: 22 March 1971 (age 54); Independence, KY
- Movement: Illustration, Drawing, Installation, sculpture

Hollis Hammonds is an American artist and academic, who is associate professor of art and chair of visual studies at St. Edward's University in Austin, Texas. Hammonds specializes in drawing and sculptural installations. She is author of the drawing textbook, Drawing Structure: Conceptual & Observational Techniques.

== Background ==
Hollis Hammonds was born in Independence, Kentucky. Hammonds received her MFA from the University of Cincinnati in 2001, and her BFA in drawing from Northern Kentucky University in 1998. She is married to graphic designer Oen Hammonds.

On March 29, 1986, a week after Hammonds' fifteenth birthday, her childhood home caught fire. She and her family members emerged from their trailer home in northern Kentucky unharmed. "As traumatic and devastating as it was, Hammonds remembers the rather surreal calm that emerged as they waited for the firetrucks to come from the other side of the county." In her work, Hammonds has used the structure of home as a metaphor for the structure of memory.

Her parents had the habit of obsessively collecting and saving simple household items. The Austin American-Statesman explains how "Her mother collected dolls and figurines and scrupulously saved her mother's belongings. Hammonds' father filled sheds with plastic bottles and bags, used lumber, [and] scrap metal. The family's defunct cars as well as a school bus and even heavy equipment such as a bulldozer, littered the woods behind the home, their eviscerated frames a perfect playscape for an imaginative, solitary child." The memory of this event is a recurring theme in Hammonds work. Hammonds told the Austin American-Statesman that "Ever since then, I've been obsessed with piles of rubble, and I've been trying to memorialize events and preserve memories through my various collections, constructions, and drawings."

== Career ==
Before 2011, Hammonds worked in a manner that was less personal. The art work that occurred prior was about consumerist culture. Her current work is autobiographical. Hammonds states "My works are filled with a variety of images, from mundane objects to precious artifacts, assembled, collected and collaged together through drawings and installations. The works themselves act as evidence, whether that be evidence of personal memories or broader events affecting larger communities. No matter what form the work takes, there are threads of memory intertwined with a sort of collective consciousness. My goal when combining a variety of images or junk picked up on street corners, is to create some scene that feels real to me, something that conjures and feels as close to my own memories as possible."

Hammonds works in multi-media often mixing sculpture with drawing in installations. Her work has been exhibited widely including at Dishman Art Museum in Beaumont, TX; Redux Contemporary Art Center in Charleston, SC; the Reed Gallery at the University of Cincinnati in OH; the Museum of Art at University of Southern Mississippi in Hattiesburg, MS; the Hiestand Galleries at Miami University in Oxford, Ohio; Texas Tech University in Lubbock, TX; and at Women and Their Work gallery in Austin, TX. As of 2013, she is the Chair of the Department of Visual Studies at St. Edward's University in Austin, TX. Hammonds teaches courses in drawing, public art, and the graphic novel. "... she is serving as an Associate Dean of Humanities, too." Hammonds was appointed as one of the seven-member Art in Public Places panel for Austin, TX.

She was a 2016 Artist-in-Residence at the McColl Center for Art + Innovation in Charlotte, NC.

Hammonds maintains a studio at the Canopy arts complex in South Austin, Texas and she is working on a graphic novel.

Hammonds states about her work:

Ranging from detailed drawings to sculptural installations, my creative works deal with memory, material consumption, waste, catastrophe and superficial loss. Questioning consumerist culture through evidence of accumulation, hoarding and collecting, piles of debris and trash fill my drawings and installations. Currently, through a memoir style graphic novel project called Blanket of Fog, I'm combining my own childhood memories with my interests in consumerist culture and environmental issues.

"Blanket of Fog" was a solo exhibition at Women and Their Work. It is an artistic retelling of the fire that burned down her childhood home. In an article published in the Austin American-Statesman, Hammonds states "I like the blur between fact and fiction, between what happened and the way we want to remember it."

Austin Chronicle named her work one of the top ten "most memorable art of 2015" for her installation, Blanket of Fog, at Women & Their Work. The same year she spoke on a panel about drawing at the CAA conference with artists Jane Hammond, Richard Moninski and Elise Engler.

== Catalogues ==
- "Finalists." International Drawing Annual 8, 2014. (cover)
- "Winners: Western Competition 2014." New American Paintings
- "Finalists." International Drawing Annual 7, 2013.
- Broz, Debra, ed. "The End." Cantanker, no. 14 (2012): 34–35.
- Uppercase Magazine
- Studio Visit Magazine, v. 16. January 1, 2011, 76–77.
- "Finalists." International Drawing Annual 4 (2009)
- B.j.u.r.e. Biennial Juried Underground Railroad Exhibition, Visual Journey: Enslavement, Underground Railroad, Freedom. Highland Heights, Kentucky: Northern Kentucky University, 2004. 52–53.

== Bibliography ==
- Hammonds, Hollis. Drawing Structure: Conceptual & Observational Techniques. Kendal Hunt Publishing. 2011.
- Hammonds, Hollis. "Forward." In And Also With You: Pato Hebert, 3–4. Austin, Texas: St. Edward's University Fine Arts Gallery, 2011.
- Hammonds, Hollis. "Notes on Drawing ..." In Summer Some Aren't, Cover, 4–5, 8–9. Cincinnati, Ohio: U-turn Art Space, 2010.
