= Sharif Bey =

African American artist, ceramicist and professor

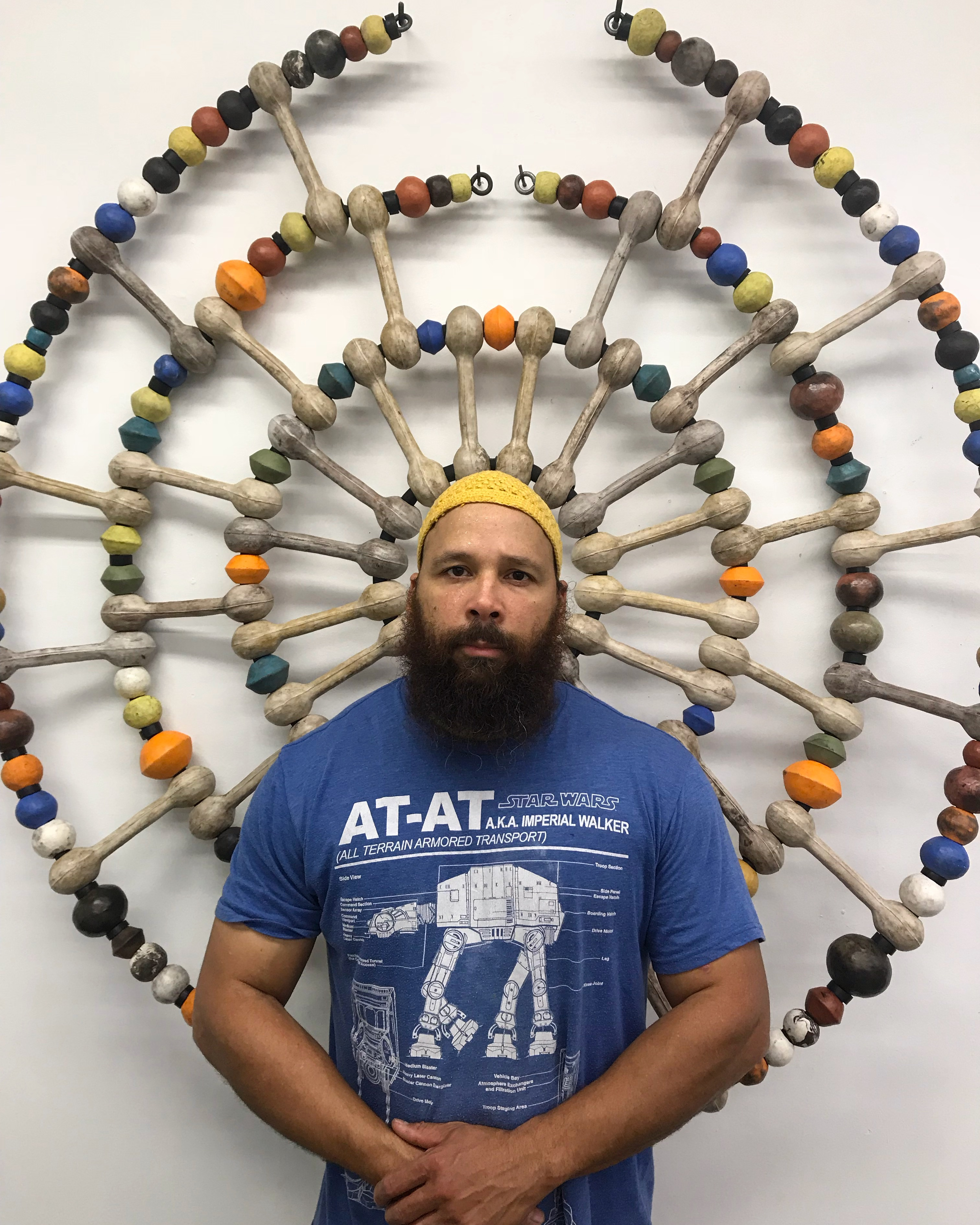
- With bead-inspired sculpture "Louie Bones: Omega"
- Born: 1974 (age 51–52); Pittsburgh, Pennsylvania, U.S.
- Education: Slippery Rock University (BFA); University of North Carolina (MFA); Pennsylvania State University (PhD)
- Known for: Ceramics
- Website: sharifbeyceramics.com

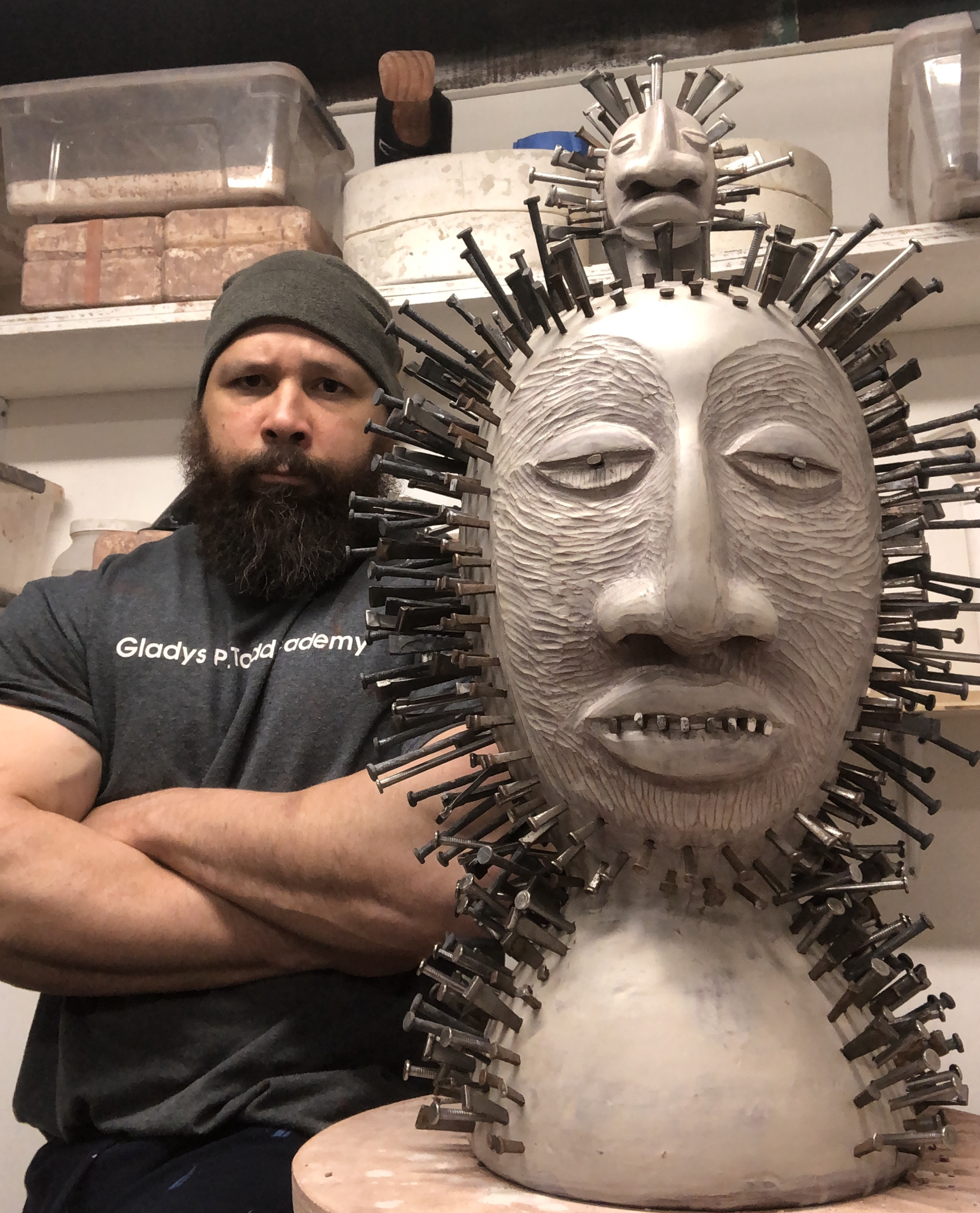
Bey with Nkisi-Inspired work in progress

Sharif Bey (born 1974, Pittsburgh, Pennsylvania, U.S.) is an African American artist, ceramicist, professor, and the inaugural recipient of the 2026 Spector Craft Prize. He produces functional pottery as well as ceramic and mixed-media sculptures using various forms and textures. His body of work reflects his interest in the visual heritage of Africa and Oceania and contemporary African American culture. With his colorful large-scale bead sculptures, Bey explores the cultural and political significance of ornamentation and adornment.

== Education ==
As a high school student, Bey completed a ceramics apprenticeship at the Manchester Craftsmen's Guild. The Manchester Craftsmen's Guild played a formative role for Bey throughout his teens, giving him a foundation of skills, extensive ceramics-world connections, and exposure to various visiting masters – including Jun Kaneko, Karen Karnes, Judy Moonelis, Paul Soldner, and Akio Takamori. Shortly after the fall of the Soviet Union, Bey studied sculpture with Jozef Jankovič and Juraj Meliš at The Academy of Fine Arts and Design, Bratislava (Slovak Republic). Later, he earned his BFA in ceramics from Slippery Rock University, his MFA in studio art from the University of North Carolina at Greensboro, and PhD in art education from Pennsylvania State University.

== Career ==
Bey's teaching experience includes appointments at: Winston Salem State University, Virginia Commonwealth University, and Syracuse University. He has held artist residencies at the McColl Center for Art + Innovation, John Michael Kohler Arts Center, Pittsburgh Glass Center, and Archie Bray Foundation for the Ceramic Arts.

== Art career ==
Since being featured at the Renwick Gallery Smithsonian American Art Museum in 2018, The Carnegie Museum of Art, Everson Museum of Art, Belger Arts Center and the Gardiner Museum of Ceramic Art in Toronto have all held solo exhibitions of Bey's Work. His ceramic, glass, and mixed-media sculptures can be found in public collections, including: Smithsonian American Art Museum's Renwick Gallery, Hirshhorn Museum, Museum of Fine Arts Houston, The Crystal Bridges Museum of American Art, New Orleans Museum of Art, Carnegie Museum of Art, Everson Museum of Art, Dallas Museum of Art, Mint Museum, Columbus Museum of Art, The Nelson-Atkins Museum of Art, Gardiner Museum, and John Michael Kohler Arts Center,

His work has been exhibited at:

- Sharif Bey: Colonial Ruptures (2022) Gardiner Museum
- Sharif Bey: Facets (2022) Everson Museum of Art<
- Sharif Bey: Excavations (2021–2022) Carnegie Museums of Pittsburgh
- Objects USA 2020 (2020) R & Company
- Adorned (2020) McColl Center for Art and Innovation
- Pittsburgh Anthology (2019–2020) Carnegie Museums of Pittsburgh
- Disrupting Craft: Renwick Invitational (2018–2019) at the Smithsonian American Art Museum's Renwick Gallery
- Sharif Bey: Dialogues in Clay and Glass (2018) at the Pittsburgh Glass Center
