= Liz Nielsen =

American photographer based in Brooklyn

Liz Nielsen is an American photographer based in Brooklyn.

== Career ==
Nielsen prefers using traditional analog photography methods with hand-made negatives and natural lighting. She graduated with a BFA from the School of the Art Institute of Chicago in 2002 and a MFA from the University of Illinois at Chicago two years later.

Nielsen's photography has been featured in The New Yorker, The New York Times, Wall Street Journal, Hyperallergic ArtSlant, British Journal of Photography, and LensCulture.

Her work has been exhibited at Black Box Projects in London, the Denny Gallery in New York, Danziger Gallery in New York, and SOCO Gallery in North Carolina. Nielsen and Carolina Wheat founded the Elijah Wheat Showroom in 2016, and have also co-organized the exhibition Transaction at Knockdown Gallery.

She was a 2020 Artist-in-Residence at the McColl Center for Art + Innovation in Charlotte, North Carolina.
