= Marion Wilson (artist) =

American artist

- Occupations: American artist and professor

Marion Wilson is an American artist whose mixed media installations have gained critical attention.

== Education ==
In 1983, Marion Wilson received her B.A. in Studio Art from Wesleyan University. She received her M.A. in Urban Pedagogy from Columbia University in 1990, and her M.F.A. from the University of Cincinnati in 1993. In 2018 she was an Artist-in-Residence at the McColl Center for Art + Innovation.

== Work ==
Wilson works in sculpture, photography and painting.

At Syracuse University, Wilson created an interdisciplinary curriculum for artists and architects – revitalizing urban spaces to address critical social issues. She received the Chancellors award for Global Citizenship for the "new Directions in Social Sculpture" curriculum that two design build projects: MLAB and 601 Tully. 601 Tully was the renovation of a neighborhood drug house into a neighborhood art center. MLAB was transforming a 1984 RV into a mobile field station linking art and botany and taking it from Maine to Miami.

Wilson has been acknowledged for her "'Last Suppers' series of mixed-media installations that focus on the final meals of famous killers. The series combines video, photography and sculpture to comment on what Wilson perceives is the irony inherent in offering a condemned man his last supper." Commissioned for the "Counter Culture" exhibition at the New Museum, Wilson set up an art-vending cart outside the Bowery Mission, an organization for the homeless. She made small sculptures from common objects cast in resin, hair sculpture, knitted scarves. She bartered and traded skills and objects with people on the LES and ran the business with three men served at the Bowery Mission.

== Exhibitions ==
=== Selected solo exhibitions ===
- 2016 // Schuylkill Center for Art and Environment
- 2015 // Pulse Art Fair Miami, Frederieke Taylor Gallery
- 2010 // Artificially Free of Nature; Frederieke Taylor Gallery, – paintings of superfund site in four seasons. New York
- 2009 // Museum of the City of Lost and Found, Warehouse Gallery, Syracuse, NY
- 2005 // Tender, Cheryl Pelavin Fine Arts, NYC, NY
- 2005 // -scopeNewYork, guest installation artist
- 2004 // -scopeMiami, "This Store Too", guest performance artist, curated by Melanie Cohn, New Museum
- 2004 // ARTWALK NY, "This Store Too", installation, New School, NY
- 2003 // Remnants of Luxury in Forbidden Play, Cheryl Pelavin Fine Arts, New York
- 2003 // Distilled Lives, Everson Museum of Art, Syracuse, NY, catalog
- 2003 // Marion Wilson, Dowd Fine Arts Center, SUNY Cortland, Cortland, NY
- 2000 // Playing War, Sculpture Center, New York, NY, video/public project, funded by Gunk Foundation
- 1999 // Playing War, Hallwalls Contemporary Arts Center, Buffalo, NY
- 1999 // Marion Wilson: Recent Work, Dana Arts Center, Colgate University, Hamilton, NY
- 1998 // Boy and Memory Rags, Olean Public Art Gallery, Olean, NY
- 1996 // Automata Urban Poems and Other Dead Things (Performance and installation in an Armory Square storefront,) Syracuse, NY
- 1995 // Abjections/Devotions; Two person exhibition, SPACES Gallery, Cleveland, OH
- 1994 // Corporeal Investigations, George Ayers Cress Gallery, University of Tennessee, TN
- 1994 // Marion Wilson: Corpus Politik, Thomas Moore College, KY, Visiting Artist
- 1993 // Corpus Politik, Tangeman Gallery, University of Cincinnati

=== Public art projects: interactive collaborations ===
- 2015–2017 // The Mobile Field Station (I Want to Teach the Whole World to Draw....moss) is a mobile art and science moss herbarium in collaboration with expert bryologists beginning at PULSE 2015 Art Fair/Miami Art Basel Week and travelling to urban and rural sites observing, classifying, drawing with ancient and current technologies through public engagement activities.
- 2014 // I-81 Urban Rest Stop, Public Art Project; NEA funded, curated by Marc Norman
- 2013 // Transporting, IDEAS City; New Museum/Arts Brookfield in Battery Park City, Artist in Resident in Habitat for Artists; Battery Park City, curated by Amy Lipton/Simon Draper
- 2010-2013 // Complete Design/Build of 601 Tully (Center for Engaged Research); affiliate of Syracuse University. Led a team of 54 neighbors and students in the complete re-design/build/sustain of an abandoned residence—turned drug house in the ninth-poorest neighborhood in America—the near westside of Syracuse - as an artist driven neighborhood revitalization project. 601 Tully now supports artists, neighbors and university in the co-production of new culture through residencies, exhibitions and public projects.
- 2009 // Museum of the City of Lost and Found (solo project in group exhibition); KK Projects, New Orleans Biennial; commissioned a new work in the form of a mobile bicycle structure that collected, housed, travelled and interpreted objects of loss and findings.
- 2008 // MLAB (transformed 1984 American Eagle RV into mobile literacy arts bus gallery, classroom and digital lab for Syracuse city public schools). Led a design build team of nine in the complete renovation of MLAB.
- 2004 // Counter Culture, New Museum of Contemporary Art, NYC
