= Ambreen Butt =

Pakistani artist

- Born: 1969 (age 56–57); Lahore, Pakistan
- Education: National College of Arts, Lahore, Pakistan (BFA, 1993) Massachusetts College of Art (MFA, 1997)
- Known for: Drawings, miniature paintings, prints, and collage
- Awards: Maud Morgan Prize (2006) James and Audrey Foster Prize (1999)
- Website: http://www.ambreenbutt.com

Ambreen Butt (born 1969) is a Boston-based Pakistani American artist best known for her drawings, paintings, prints, and collages, and has been recognized for her labor intensive, painted self-portraits that portray feminist and political ideas through traditional Persian art. She now resides in Dallas, TX.

== Education ==
Butt obtained her Bachelor’s of Fine Art in traditional Indian and Persian miniature painting from the National College of Arts in Lahore. She later moved to Boston in 1993 and in 1997 she received her Master’s of Fine Arts in Painting from Massachusetts College of Art (now Massachusetts College of Art and Design).

== Art ==
Butt's work is rooted in her bi-cultural identity and retains the intricate, decorative patterning that characterizes Indian and Persian miniature painting. One such work, I Am My Lost Diamond (2011), created for her Realms of Intimacy exhibition at the Cincinnati Contemporary Art Center, combined more than 20,000 sculpted fingers and toes cast in resin to create an image of fireworks or flower blossoms when viewed at a distance. The work was influenced by a friend's experience narrowly escaping from a suicide bombing in Butt's hometown of Lahore. She has updated the medium's painstaking technique with new materials, such as PET film, thread and collage.

Ambreen Butt's work, her miniature paintings, more specifically, are made to exemplify social issues. In particular, Butt's work addresses gender roles, cultural differences, the notion of freedom, and the meaning of human rights. This is achieved by blending imagery from newspapers and historical depictions on her canvases. One such social issue, as mentioned, is the differences between the depiction of males and females. In an interview, Butt explains this observation; “I was particularly struck by the representation of women in miniature art. They were often depicted as small seductive creatures. [Conversely,] The male icons [...] had a more god-like representation." “I was more concerned with the woman herself, rather than her body.”

Butt has also employed printmaking techniques in her work. Her 2008 series Dirty Pretty combines the techniques of etching, silkscreen, and lithography, while earlier untitled series combine etching and aquatint.

More recently, Butt's work has been featured on the exterior of the Isabella Stewart Gardener Museum. The enlarged piece is a celebration of the heroism of Mukhtar Mai, a woman gang-raped at the order of her local council in an act of honor revenge. The U.S. State Department also commissioned a large-scale piece that now hangs in the U.S. embassy in Islamabad.

== Awards ==
In 1999, Butt received the inaugural James and Audrey Foster Prize from the Institute of Contemporary Art, Boston. That same year, Butt was artist-in-residence at the Isabella Stewart Gardner Museum, where she was the first artist in the program to open her studio to the public and engage directly with visitors. She was a 2002 Artist-in-Residence at the McColl Center for Art + Innovation in Charlotte, NC. She has also been the recipient of the Brother Thomas Fellowship from the Boston Foundation, Maud Morgan Prize from the Museum of Fine Arts, Boston, and a Joan Mitchell Foundation grant. In 2009, she received an Artadia Award.

== Selected exhibition history ==
Solo exhibitions

- 2003 - I Must Utter What Comes to My Lips, Worcester, Massachusetts, Worcester Art Museum, March 1 - May 11
- 2005 - I Need A Hero, Kustera Tilton Gallery, New York, June 23 - July 29, 2005
- 2019 - Mark My Words, National Museum for Women in the Arts, December 7, 2018 - April 14, 2019
