= Mary Tsiongas =

Greek mutil-disciplinary artist

- Born: 1959 (age 66–67); Greece
- Education: California College of the Arts

Mary Tsiongas (born 1959) is a multi-disciplinary artist whose work often addresses human relationships to technology and the natural environment. Her new media work delves into themes of metaphysics, time, games, chance, and memory.

== Life ==
Born in Greece and now based in Albuquerque, New Mexico, Mary Tsiongas has performed, exhibited, and lectured extensively for the past fifteen years.

She received her MFA in film, video, and performance from the California College of the Arts in 1993. She is currently an associate professor in electronic media in the Art and Art History Department at the University of New Mexico.

== Exhibitions ==
Tsiongas' work has been shown in over fifty solo and group exhibitions nationally and internationally, including ARTSPACE, Sydney, Australia; NOGA Gallery, Tel Aviv, Israel; San Jose Museum of Art, San Jose, CA; National Museum of Women in the Arts, Washington, D.C.; and the Lincoln Center, New York.

== Awards ==
2017 • Artist Residency, UCROSS Foundation, Clearmont, WY

2015 • Women to Watch 2015, National Museum of Women in the Arts, Washington, DC

2013 • Residency and workshop, McColl Center, Charlotte, NC

2011 • University of New Mexico College of Fine Arts Creative Work Grant

2010 • PLAND Residency: Topographia Collective with L. Montgomery C. Harris, J. Lovell

2008 • University of New Mexico College of Fine Arts Creative Work Grant

2007 • University of New Mexico, Research Allocations Committee Large RAC grant

2005 • P.L.A.C.E Grant for "The Pitch" Advanced Projects in Electronic Arts

2004 • University of New Mexico College of Fine Arts Creative Work Grant

2003 • University of New Mexico, Research Allocations Committee RAC grant

2001 • University of New Mexico College of Fine Arts Creative Work Grant

1997 • Headlands Center for the Arts, Artist in residence, Sausalito, CA

1995 • Western States Arts Federation (WESTAF), NEA Regional Fellowship, Sculpture
