= Turner Browne =

American photographer (born 1949)

Turner G. Browne (born July 6, 1949) is an American photographer.

== Biography ==
Turner Browne was born on July 6, 1949, in Lake Charles, Louisiana. From 1969 to 1970 he attended Louisiana State University in Baton Rouge. He is a self-taught photographer and has worked with all film formats as well as digital. In 1973, the Sunflower Foundation gave him a grant which launched his career. In 1977 Louisiana Cajuns was published by the Louisiana State University Press, a monograph of his documentation of the rural Cajuns; the text is in both English and French. The same year a documentary film called The New Klan was released in which he was the lead cinematographer. Two years later he was the director of photography on the feature film Only Once in a Lifetime. In 1987 The French Institute in New York City exhibited Louisiana Cajuns; from there the work was exhibited nationally. In 2000 Browne donated his Louisiana Cajun collection to the Library of Congress in Washington, D.C. He co-authored The Macmillan Dictionary of Photographic Artists and Innovators with author Elaine Bernstein Partnow; it was published in 1983. A monograph of his documentary work on the White River of Arkansas, The Last River, was published in 1993; the book inspired director Jeff Nichols in his making of the film Mud. As of 2016, Turner worked as a photographer and videographer in Los Angeles.
