= Carlos Estévez (artist) =

Cuban artist (born 1969)

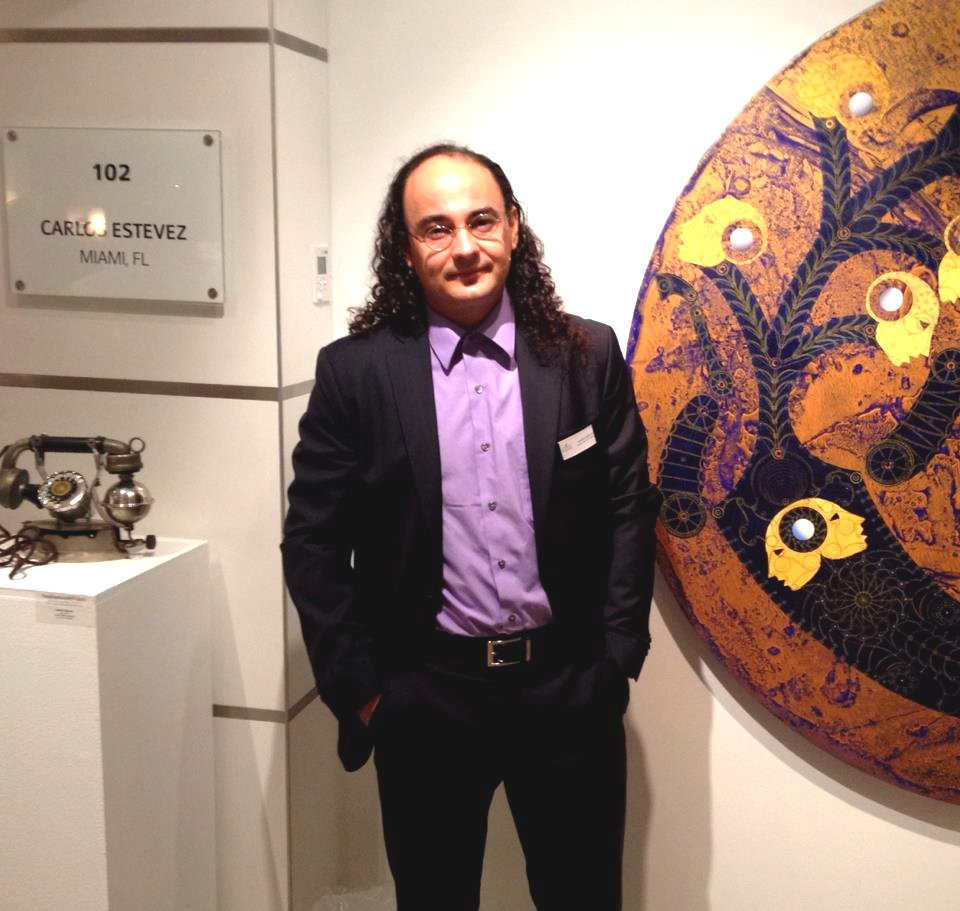
- Estévez in 2013
- Born: 1969 (age 56–57); Havana, Cuba
- Education: Instituto Superior de Arte
- Known for: Visual arts, ceramic art
- Awards: Grand Prize, First Salon of Contemporary Cuban Art (1995); Joan Mitchell Foundation Painters & Sculptors Grant (2015)

Carlos Estévez (born 1969) is a Cuban visual artist known for his work in painting, sculpture, and ceramics. He received the Grand Prize in the First Salon of Contemporary Cuban Art in 1995, as well as The Joan Mitchell Foundation Painters & Sculptors Grant in 2015.

== Early life and education ==
Carlos Estévez was born in Havana in 1969. Estévez graduated from the Instituto Superior de Arte, Havana, Cuba, in 1992.

== Career ==
He has done residencies at the Academia de San Carlos, UNAM, Mexico (1997), Gasworks Studios, London, England (1997), the UNESCO-ASCHBERG in The Nordic Artists' Center in Dale, Norway (1998), Art-OMI Foundation, New York, U.S. (1998), The Massachusetts College of Art, Boston, Massachusetts, U.S. (2002), Cité internationale des arts in Paris, (2003–2004), Montclair University, New Jersey, U.S. (2005), and the McColl Center in Charlotte, North Carolina, U.S. (2016).

His work La batalla permanente de la vida transitoria (The Permanent Battle of the Transitory Life), from 2010, is included in the permanent collection of the Pérez Art Museum Miami, Florida.

During a four-month residency at the McColl Center in Charlotte, he made over 200 ceramic pieces. His plates concentrate on color, expressive shapes, and thematic abstractions that refer to architecture, astronomy, and anatomy.

== Selected exhibitions ==
=== Solo ===
- FIREWORKS, Kendall Art Center, Miami, Florida, U.S.
- Fine Arts Museum, Havana, Cuba
- The Patricia and Phillip Frost Art Museum at Florida International University, Miami, Florida, U.S.
- Couturier Gallery, Los Angeles, California, U.S.
- Center of Contemporary Art, New Orleans, Louisiana, U.S.
- Pan American Art Projects, Miami, Florida, U.S.
- LaCa Projects, Charlotte, North Carolina, U.S.
- Denise Bibro Fine Art, Chelsea, New York, U.S.
- Havana Galerie, Zurich, Switzerland
- JM' Arts Galerie, Paris, France
- Alva Gallery, New London, Connecticut, U.S.
- Enlace Arte Contemporáneo, Lima, Peru
- Promo-arte Gallery, Tokyo, Japan
- Lyle O. Reitzel Gallery, Santo Domingo, Dominican Republic
- Taylor Bercier Gallery, New Orleans, Louisiana, U.S.
- UB Galleries, University at Buffalo, U.S.

=== Group ===
- VI and VII Havana Biennial, Cuba
- Contemporary Art from Cuba: Irony and Survival on the Utopian Island, Arizona State University Art Museum, Tempe, U.S.
- Cuba Avant-Garde: Contemporary Cuban Art from the Farber Collection
- Of Cuban Invention, Lesley University College of Art and Design, Cambridge, Massachusetts, U.S. (2012)
