= Bill Gaskins =

American photographer and academic

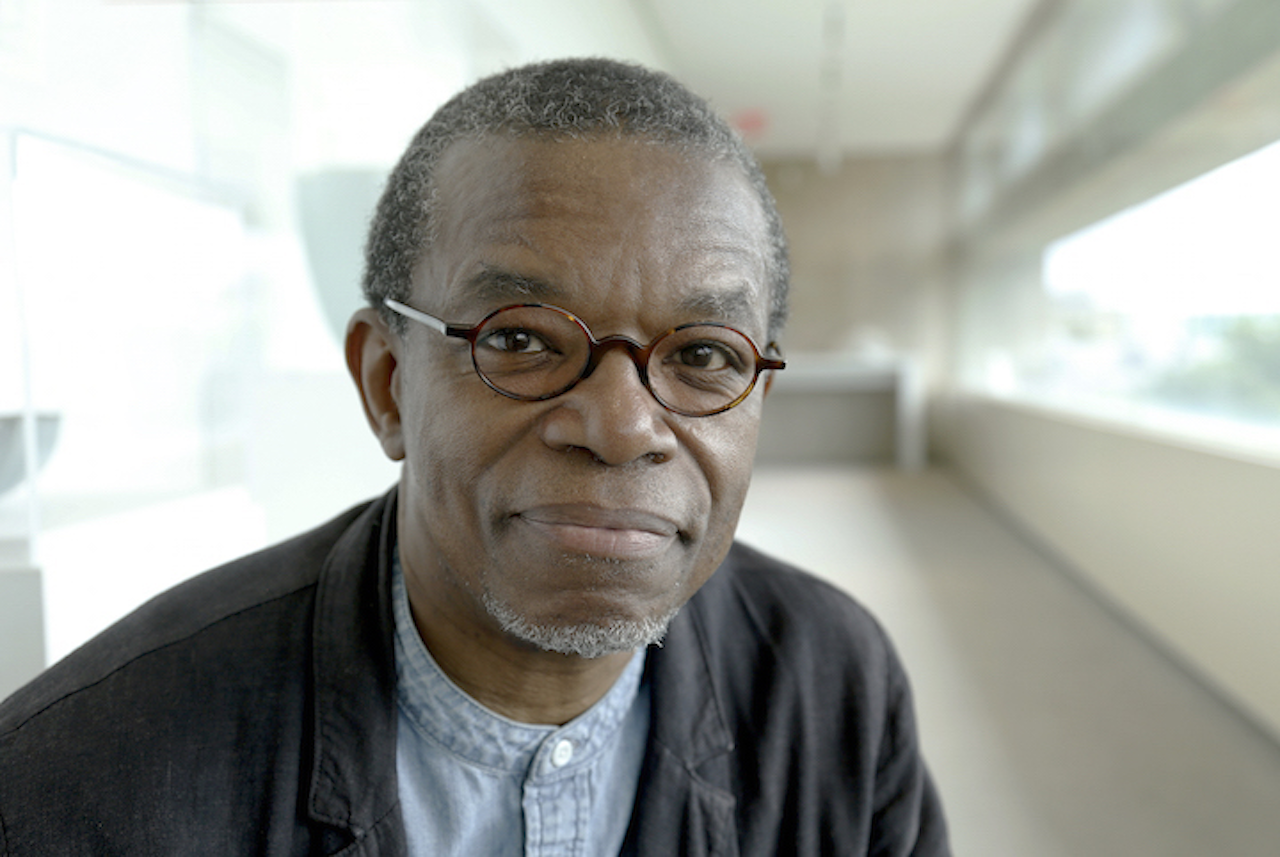
- Born: May 25, 1953 (age 73)
- Education: Maryland Institute College of Art; Ohio State University; Temple University
- Occupations: photographer, scholar
- Spouse: Noliwe Rooks
- Website: billgaskins.com

Bill Gaskins (born May 25, 1953) is an American photographer and academic. His work explores the intersection of black hair and critical analysis of the portraiture in the 21st century. In his book Good And Bad Hair: Photographs, Gaskins discusses the role of hairstyling and the representation in African American culture and he also examines the transcultural role of hair, adornment of ornaments and personal identity with the body.

== Life and education ==
Gaskins received his Bachelor of Fine Arts degree from the Tyler School of Art, a Master of Arts Degree from The Ohio State University, and a Master of Fine Arts Degree from the Maryland Institute College of Art. He was a 2008 Artist-in-Residence at the McColl Center for Art + Innovation.

== Academic work ==
Bill Gaskins has previously taught in the American Studies Program and the Department of Art at Cornell University. He has also taught at Parsons the New School, and the graduate program in Media Studies in The New School for Public Engagement. His lectures focus on an examination of race and visual representation of the black portraiture and black women. He also has conducted workshops on the history of photography.

== Photography ==
Gaskins has exhibited his photography including a group exhibition at the Jersey City Museum that also included work by Renée Green, Chitra Ganesh, Simone Leigh and Sharon Louden, and a screening of his short film, The Meaning of Hope at Detroit Institute of Arts.

His series of photographs The Cadillac Chronicles depicts black men with their Cadillacs. It was inspired by a Baltimore tradition, the Cadillac Parade, and explores the symbolism of the Cadillac as an emblem of male power and middle-class status.

His book Good and Bad Hair (1997) depicts African American hairstyles, and was based on a 1996 exhibition at Robert B. Menschel Photography Gallery.

His work was also shown in the 2003 group show HairStories at Scottsdale Museum of Contemporary Art: the Phoenix New Times called his "Tireka and Tamana, Easter Sunday, Baltimore, Maryland", a photograph of two women against the landscape of industrial Baltimore, and his photographs of African-American hair shows "the most fascinating photos of all" in the exhibition.

"Tamara and Tireka" also featured in a Smithsonian Institution exhibition Reflections in Black: A History of Black Photographers 1840 to the Present in Los Angeles.

In 2017, Gaskins spent time researching "The Black Photographers Annual," a four volume anthology published between 1973 and 1980.

== Books ==
- Gaskins, Bill (1997). Good and Bad Hair. New Brunswick: Rutgers University Press. ISBN 978-0813524757.

== Selected essays ==
- “Anthony Barboza in Conversation with Bill Gaskins.” Nka: Journal of Contemporary African Art, vol. 2015, no. 37, Nov. 2015, pp. 16–27. EBSCOhost, https://doi.org/10.1215/10757163-3339827.
- Gaskins, Bill. “Sonya Clark.” New Art Examiner 24 (March 1997): 46.
- Gaskins, Bill. “Richard Hunt.” New Art Examiner, vol. 24, May 1997, pp. 50–51.

== Exhibitions ==
Gaskins photography has been included in several exhibitions.

Year	Title	Location	Notes
2022	A Picture Gallery of the Soul	Katherine E. Nash Gallery, University of Minnesota	Co-curators: Herman Milligan and Howard Oransky. 111 photographers including Gaskins (prints from The Cadillac Chronicles), Dawoud Bey, Rashid Johnson, Bobby Holland and Carrie Mae Weems.
2022	Black Mystery Month	Clifford Gallery, Colgate University, Hamilton, NY	Solo exhibit featured 30 photographs, each a black and white image of a figure that had an impact on African American culture in the United States.
2016	Framing Beauty: Intimate Visions	The Grunwald Gallery, Indiana University	Curator: Deborah Willis. Photographers included Gaskins, Omar Victor Diop, Kalup Linzy, Gordon Parks, Ji Yeo and others. ISBN 9780253026972
2012	Wounding the Black Male: Photographs from Light Work Collection	Light Work, Syracuse, NY	Curators: Cassandra Jackson, Sarah Cunningham. Photographers included Gaskins, Hilton Braithwaite, Renee Cox, Willie Middlebrook, Clarissa Sligh, Hank Willis Thomas and others.
2001	Committed to the Image: Contemporary Black Photographers	Brooklyn Museum of Art	Exhibit featured works by 94 photographers including Gaskins, Anthony Barboza, Roland L. Freeman, Jeanne Moutoussamy-Ashe and others. ISBN 9780872731448
2000	Reflections in Black: A History of Black Photographers 1840 to the Present	Smithsonian Museum, Washington, D.C.	Curator: Deborah Willis ISBN 9780393048803

== Collections ==
- Sprint Corporation Art Collection. Acquired Exercising Benefits (2002), three triptychs surrounded by photographs of Sprint employees using the company's fitness center.
