= Endia Beal =

American visual artist, curator, and educator

- Born: February 8, 1985 (age 41); Winston-Salem, North Carolina, US
- Education: The University of North Carolina at Chapel Hill, Yale University
- Known for: Photography
- Website: endiabeal.com

Endia Beal (born February 8, 1985) is an African-American visual artist, curator, and educator. She is known for her work in creating visual narratives through photography and video testimonies focused on women of color working in corporate environments.

== Early life and education ==
Endia Beal was born on February 8, 1985, in Winston-Salem, North Carolina. She is the daughter of Frank Beal and Sheila Beal. Beal took her first photo class at University of North Carolina Greensboro. In 2008 Beal graduated from the University of North Carolina at Chapel Hill with a double bachelor's degree in Art History and Studio Art. As an undergraduate student, she attended the Studio Art Center International in Florence, Italy focusing on classic Art History of High Renaissance period.

After her bachelor's degree, Beal was selected to participate in ArtTable - a program aimed at empowering women in the visual arts. At ArtTable she represented Washington, D.C., where she helped curate the Andy Warhol Exhibit at the Luther W. Brady Art Gallery of George Washington University. During this program, she began combining her artistic practices elements from activism work to create marketing campaigns in an effort to redefine the relationship between minorities communities and art.

In 2013, Beal got a master's degree from Yale School of Art in Fine Arts and Photography. During this time she created her first body of work exploring the struggles of women of color in the professional field, in the corporate space in particular.

Since 2014 Beal has worked as the Director of Diggs Gallery at Winston-Salem State University and is an Associate Professor of Art there.

== Career ==
As her role models and sources of inspiration, Beal was interested in artists who incorporate personal stories in order to draw a bigger picture. Another important theme in Beal's works is questioning conformity and gender roles. Beal lists Carrie Mae Weems and Lorna Simpson as her personal favorites.

In her works, Beal uses visual narratives, expressed both in photo and video projects, that focus on examining the personal experiences of marginalized communities and individuals, focusing mostly on the background of African American women. Beal connects personal stories to the bigger background of the social group that she documents through her photography.

After participating in the artist-in-residence program at the Center for Photography at Woodstock, she developed her previous work in the project "Can I Touch It?" For this project, she made traditional portraits of white women that one would find in a corporate context but they wore traditional hairstyles of black women. Using role reversal, she wanted to represent the experience that she has faced herself as a black woman in the corporate field.

Another one of Beal's projects, "Am I What You Are Looking For?", focusing on portraying young black educated women entering the workforce and the personal stories behind them, was featured in VICE's 2016 Photo issue and won a grant from the Magnum Foundation.

Beal has worked in a curatorial capacity at the Southeastern Center for Contemporary Art and the Connecticut Center for Arts and Technology. She won a 2019 fellowship from Center for Curatorial Leadership.

=== Exhibitions ===
Beal's works have been exhibited in many institutions in the United States, including the Charles H. Wright Museum in Detroit, Michigan, the Harvey B. Gantt Center and the McColl Center, both in Charlotte, NC, Aperture Foundation of New York, and the Samuel Dorsky Museum of Art at State University of New York at New Paltz, Alice Austin House Museum, Photographic Center Northwest, Cathrine Edelman Gallery and Nasher Museum of Art.
