= ENDIA =

Environmental Determinants of Islet Autoimmunity (ENDIA) Study

ENDIA Study summary
- Administering Institution: University of Adelaide
- Recruitment target: 1400
- Eligibility criteria: Unborn babies or babies less than 6 months of age with a first-degree relative with type 1 diabetes (e.g. mother, father or sibling). Prior to birth the pregnant mother is enrolled in the study for investigation. After birth study participation transfers to the baby.
- Participating states: SA, WA, NSW, Vic, QLD
- Principal Investigator: Professor Jennifer Couper

The Environmental Determinants of Islet Autoimmunity (ENDIA) Study is an Australian prospective pregnancy cohort study investigating the environmental triggers responsible for the autoimmune process that leads to type 1 diabetes. The study is led by Professor Jennifer Couper from the University of Adelaide in South Australia with collaborators from the Walter and Eliza Hall Institute, Royal Melbourne Hospital, Monash University and Monash Medical Centre in Victoria, the University of NSW and the Children's Hospital at Westmead, the Royal Hospital for Women and St. George's Hospital in NSW, the University of Queensland and Mater Health Services in Queensland, and the University of Western Australia and Princess Margaret Hospital for Children in Western Australia.

The aim of the ENDIA Study is to identify environmental factors and gene-environment interactions that contribute to and protect against the development of islet autoimmunity and progression to type 1 diabetes in children genetically at-risk. The study will follow 1,400 infants with a first-degree relative with type 1 diabetes prospectively from early pregnancy into childhood to investigate relationships between prenatal and postnatal environmental factors, and the development of islet autoimmunity and subsequent type 1 diabetes. ENDIA will evaluate the microbiome, nutrition, bodyweight/composition, metabolome-lipidome, insulin resistance, innate and adaptive immune function and viral infections. A systems biology approach will integrate multi-omics analyses to explore hypotheses and mechanisms underlying the development of islet autoimmunity.

The protocol for the ENDIA Study was published in BMC Pediatrics in 2013.

== Funding ==
The ENDIA Study is funded by the National Health and Medical Research Council (NHMRC) of Australia, The Leona M. and Harry B. Helmsley Charitable Trust and the JDRF.
