= List of tallest buildings in North Carolina =

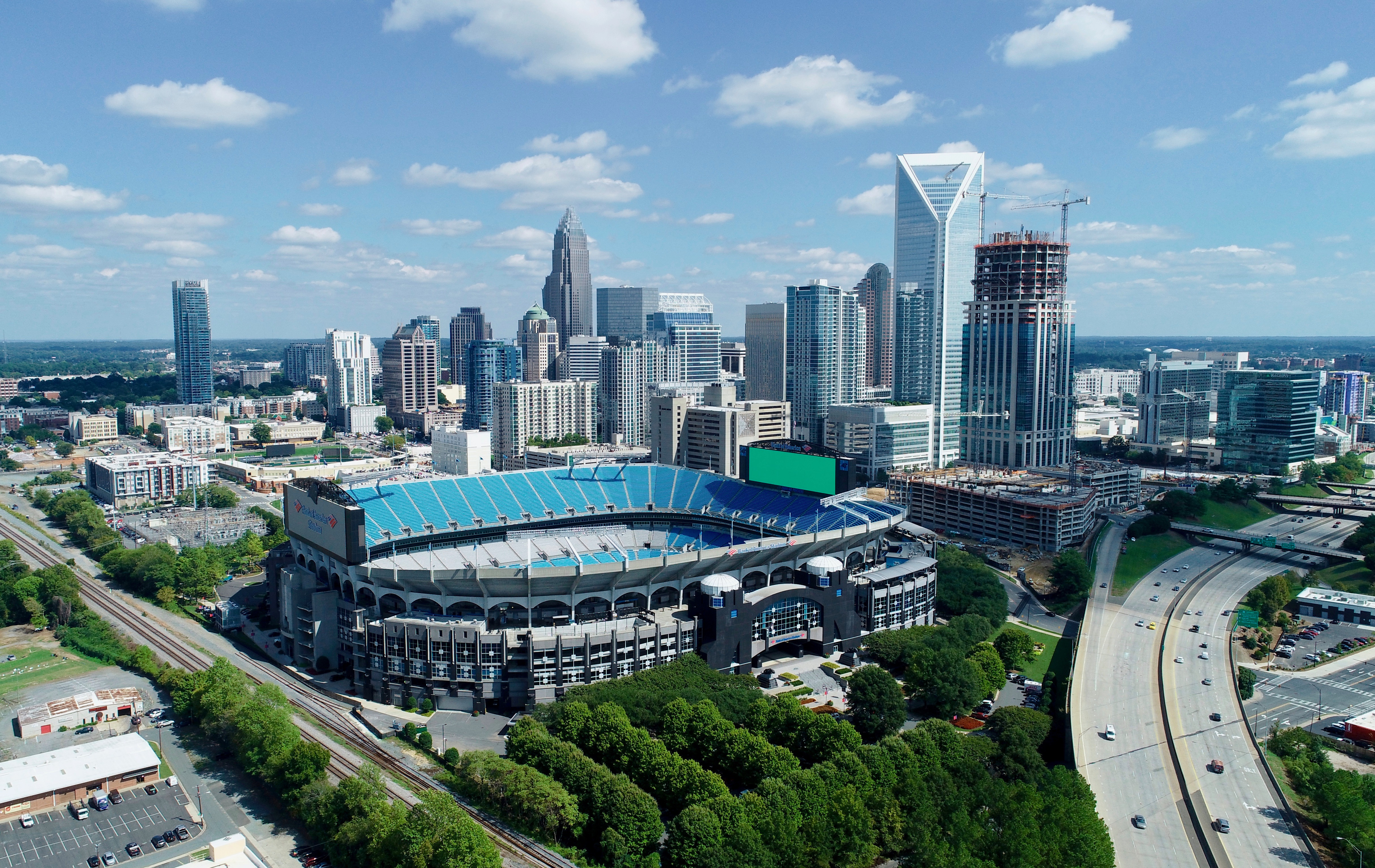
Skyline of Uptown Charlotte in 2018

This list of tallest buildings in North Carolina ranks high rises in the U.S. state of North Carolina by height. The tallest building in North Carolina is the Bank of America Corporate Center in Charlotte, which contains 60 floors and is 871 ft (265 m) tall. The second-tallest building in the state is 550 South Tryon, also in Charlotte, North Carolina, which rises 786 feet (240 m) above the ground. Nine of the 10 tallest buildings as well as 17 of the 20 tallest buildings in North Carolina are in Charlotte.

== Tallest buildings ==
This list ranks North Carolina high-rise buildings that stand at least 200 feet (60.96 m) tall, based on standard height measurement. This includes spires and architectural details but does not include antenna masts or other objects not part of the original plans. Existing structures are included for ranking purposes based on present height. This list includes only buildings that have been completed and not just Topped out.

Rank	Name	Image	Height ft / m	Floors	Year	City	Notes
1	Bank of America Corporate Center		871 / 265	60	1992	Charlotte	56th-tallest in the United States and the tallest between Philadelphia and Atlanta; tallest building in Charlotte and North Carolina since 1992. However, it is the 2nd largest building in Charlotte by leasable square feet, the first is 550 South Tryon.
2	550 South Tryon		786 / 240	54	2010	Charlotte	550 South Tryon is the 851st-tallest in the world, the 97th-tallest in the United States, and the 2nd-tallest in North Carolina. With 1,370,214 square feet (127,297.0 m^{2}) of space it is the largest office building in Charlotte by leasable square feet.
3	Truist Center		659 / 201	47	2002	Charlotte	Tallest building constructed in Charlotte in the 2000s. It is the 5th largest office building in Charlotte by leasable square feet.
4	Bank of America Tower		632 / 193	33	2019	Charlotte	It is the 8th largest office building in Charlotte by leasable square feet.
5	Duke Energy Plaza		629 / 191.7	40	2023	Charlotte	Will be leased by Duke Energy. Construction started in May 2019. It will become the new headquarters for Duke. The building topped out on August 20, 2021. It is the 3rd largest building by leasable square feet.
6	301 South College		588 / 179	42	1988	Charlotte	Tallest building constructed in Charlotte in the 1980s. It is the 4th largest building in Charlotte by leasable square feet.
7	The Vue		576 / 175.5	50	2010	Charlotte	6th Tallest building in Charlotte and the tallest residential high rise in North Carolina
8	Queensbridge Collective Vivian		556 / 169.5	42	2026	Charlotte	The tower is 42 stories with 409 apartments.It is the tallest building in Charlotte outside of Uptown Charlotte.
9	PNC Plaza		538 / 164	32	2008	Raleigh	Previously known as RBC Plaza; was the U.S. headquarters of RBC Bank With 276,000 square feet (25,600 m^{2}) of leasable space it is the thirteenth largest office building in the triangle area.
10	One South at The Plaza		503 / 153	40	1974	Charlotte	It is the 7th largest building in Charlotte by leasable square feet.
11	1 Bank of America Center		484 / 148	32	2010	Charlotte	9th-tallest in North Carolina. With 746,152 square feet of leasable space, it is the 9th largest office building in Charlotte. The building opened in June 2010. Bank of America owns the building and occupies 95% of it. Bank employees started occupying the building in July 2010. It is the 10th largest office building in Charlotte by leasable square feet.
12	300 South Tryon (Note: Height estimated by the CTBUH.)		463 141	25	2017	Charlotte	Anchored by Barings It is the 14th largest office building in Charlotte by leasable square feet.
13	121 West Trade		462 / 141	32	1990	Charlotte	Also known as the Interstate Tower
14	100 North Main Street		460 / 140	34	1995	Winston-Salem	Tallest building in Winston-Salem since 1995, as well as the tallest in North Carolina outside of Charlotte and Raleigh. The building contains 549,000 square feet (51,000 m^{2}) of space. It was 95% leased as February 2012, tenants at that time included Wells Fargo, Deutsche Bank Securities, Morgan Stanley Smith Barney and Wake Forest Baptist Medical Center. In October 2018 WFC Property LLC of Oklahoma City purchased the building for $62 million.
15	Three Wells Fargo Center		450 / 137	32	2000	Charlotte	Originally known as Three First Union Center It is the 6th largest building in Charlotte by leasable square feet.
16	201 North Tryon		447 / 136.3	30	1997	Charlotte	Also known as the IJL Financial Center and 201 North Tryon It is the 12th largest office building in Charlotte by leasable square feet.
16	Museum Tower		447 / 136.3	42	2017	Charlotte	43-story apartment tower developed by Childress Klein, built atop of the Mint Museum
18	301 South Tryon		433 / 132	32	1971	Charlotte	Originally known as Two First Union Center It is the 9th largest building in Charlotte by leasable square feet.
19	Two Hannover Square		431 / 131	29	1991	Raleigh	Commonly referred to as the "BB&T Building" With 441,000 square feet (41,000 m^{2}) of leasable space it is the third largest office building in the Triangle area.
20	Avenue		425 / 129.5	36	2007	Charlotte	
21	400 South Tryon		420 / 128	32	1974	Charlotte	It is the 21st-tallest in North Carolina. The building entered foreclosure in November 2024 after defaulting on a $93.5 million loan. In April 2025 the building was put up for public auction. The only bid was for $36 million. At the time of the auction the building was 23% occupied.
22	Winston Tower		410 / 125	29	1966	Winston-Salem	Tallest building in Winston-Salem from 1966 to 1995
23	150 Fayetteville		400 / 121.9	30	1990	Raleigh	With 550,980 square feet (51,188 m^{2}) of leasable space it is largest office building in the triangle area.
24	Carillon Tower		394 / 120	24	1991	Charlotte	It is the 19th largest office building in Charlotte by leasable square feet.
25	Charlotte Plaza		388 / 119	28	1982	Charlotte	It is the 13th largest office building in Charlotte by leasable square feet.
26	The Ellis		384 / 117	33	2021	Charlotte	549 apartment units with 19,000 square feet of retail. Completed June 2021. It is one of the tallest residential towers in Charlotte. It is the 14th largest apartment complex in the Charlotte area.
27	Ally Charlotte Center		378 / 115.2	26	2021	Charlotte	Construction started in December 2016. Delivered on May 3, 2021. It is the 11th largest office building in Charlotte by leasable square feet.
28	The Eastern		377 / 114.9	36	2022	Raleigh	Also named “Walter Tower” after Sir Walter Raleigh, 36-story apartment building located in the North Hills area and developed by Kane Realty Corp. This tower features 376 residential units and 6,500 SF of retail.
29	Lincoln Financial Building		374 / 114	20	1990	Greensboro	Tallest building in Greensboro
30	FNB Tower Charlotte		364 / 111	30	2021	Charlotte	FNB Corporation anchored building will include 156,000 square feet of office space, 196 luxury apartments, and 2,300 square feet of retail. Ground broke in December 2018. The building opened on July 21, 2021.
31	FNB Tower		358 / 109	32	2019	Raleigh	Regional headquarters of First National Bank. Includes 239 apartments. Formerly known as Charter Square North.
32	Lowe's Global Technology Center		357 / 108.814	23	2021	Charlotte	It sits across the street from the Design Center of the Carolinas and is anchored by Lowe's. It is the second tallest building outside Uptown.
33	University Tower		356 / 108.5	17	1986	Durham	Tallest building in Durham
34	Sheraton Greensboro Hotel at Four Seasons		351 / 107	28	1991	Greensboro	Tallest hotel in Greensboro
35	Radius Dilworth Overlook		345 / 105.1	26	2025	Charlotte	The complex is composed of 2 apartment towers with a combined total of 626 units with 6,000 square feet (560 m^{2}) of ground level retail. It is the 7th-largest apartment community in the Charlotte area. It is also the tallest building in Dilworth
35	Oro Ballantyne		345 / 105.1	26	2025	Charlotte	It is a 26-story apartment tower that will have 365 units that is split between the high-rise and mid-rise buildings located in Ballantyne Corporate Park as part of The Bowl, which is a part of the Ballantyne Reimagined project. The building topped out in March 2024 and it is on track to deliver in October 2025.
37	Catalyst		338 / 103	27	2009	Charlotte	The complex contains 462 units, it is the 23rd largest apartment community in the Charlotte area.
37	Ascent Uptown		338 / 103	33	2017	Charlotte	32-story apartment tower developed and owned by Greystar Real Estate Partners
39	Honeywell Tower		331 / 101	23	2021	Charlotte	The building contains 373,921 square feet (34,738.4 m^{2}) of leasable space, which makes it the 27th-largest office building in Charlotte.
40	GMAC Tower		330 / 100.6	21	1980	Winston-Salem	
40	525 North Tryon		330 / 100.6	19	1999	Charlotte	It is the 24th largest office building in Charlotte by leasable square feet.
42	300 North Greene Street		329 / 100.2	21	1989	Greensboro	The building sits on one acre, it contains 324,405 square feet (30,138.2 m^{2}) of space. The building houses the corporate headquarters for The Fresh Market and Bell Partners. It was sold in December 2021 for $30.4 million to Argentic.
43	TradeMark		325 / 99.1	28	2007	Charlotte	
44	First Citizens Plaza		320 / 97.5	23	1987	Charlotte	It is the 20th largest office building in Charlotte by leasable square feet.
45	Kingston South End		318 / 96.9	24	2024	Charlotte	It is a 24-story residential tower with 324 apartments and 15,000 square feet (1,400 m^{2}) of ground floor retail.
45	600 South Tryon		318 / 96.9	24	2025	Charlotte	It is the 4th office tower that is a part of the Legacy Union project. The 24-story tower contains 415,000 square feet (38,600 m^{2}), which makes it the 25th largest office building in Charlotte by square footage.
45	Linea		318 / 96.9	24	2025	Charlotte	It is an apartment tower with 370 units along with 18,700 square feet (1,740 m^{2}) of ground-floor retail and restaurant space. It is being built next to the completed The Line where Sycamore Brewing relocated.
48	Reynolds Building		314 / 95.7	22	1929	Winston-Salem	Tallest building in Winston-Salem from 1929 to 1966.
49	The Arlington		310 / 94.5	24	2002	Charlotte	
49	Skye		310 / 94.	23	2013	Charlotte	
51	110 East		305 / 92.9	23	2024	Charlotte	It is a 370,000 square feet (34,000 m^{2}) office tower with 7,000 square feet (650 m^{2}) of street level retail. This square footage makes it the 28th largest office building in Charlotte and the largest building in South End.
52	One Independence Center		301 / 91.8	22	1983	Charlotte	It is the 18th largest office building in Charlotte by leasable square feet.
53	AC Hotel/Residence Inn Charlotte EpiCentre		300 (91.5)	23	1987	Charlotte	Construction started in 2015. Completed for a spring 2018 opening. It contains 300 hotel rooms, which makes it the eleventh largest hotel by number of rooms.
53	200 South College		300 / 91.4	22	1974	Charlotte	It is the 17th largest office building in Charlotte by leasable square feet.
53	Novus		300 / 91.4	27	2025	Durham	A residential building containing 54 condos, 188 apartments, and ground floor retail.
56	200 South Tryon		299 / 91.1	18	1961	Charlotte	Tallest building constructed in Charlotte in the 1960s.
57	One Progress Plaza		298 / 91	21	1977	Raleigh	Tallest building in Raleigh from 1977 to 1990. With 440,000 square feet (41,000 m^{2}) of leasable space it is the second largest office building in the triangle area.
58	One City Center		296 / 90.2	27	2018	Durham	Mixed use residential.
59	The Westin Charlotte		293 / 89.3	25	2003	Charlotte	It contains 700 hotel rooms, which makes it the largest hotel in the Charlotte area.
59	550 South		293 / 89.3	20	2009	Charlotte	
61	The Hilton Charlotte Center City (Note: Height estimated by Emporis.)		292 / 89	22	1990	Charlotte	It contains 400 hotel rooms, which makes it the 5th largest hotel in Charlotte by number of rooms.
62	650 S Tryon		291 / 88.6	18	2020	Charlotte	Second office tower planned on the Legacy Union development site. Construction completed mid November 2020.
63	One Bank of America Plaza		289 / 88	17	1985	Raleigh	The 370,284 square feet (34,400.5 m^{2}) building was purchased by Highwoods Properties in September 2014 for $92.3 million. Previously REIT purchased the building in 2005 for $47.1 million. Also known as One Bank of America Square and One Bank of America Plaza. With 373,641 square feet (34,712.4 m^{2}) of leasable space it is the fifth largest office building in the triangle area.
64	Red Hat Tower		286 / 87.2	20	1927	Raleigh	Previously the headquarters of Progress Energy; is now the headquarters of Red Hat.
65	JW Marriott Charlotte		280 / 85.3	22	2021	Charlotte	Construction started in December 2018. Part of the Ally Charlotte Center. Once completed it will be the 7th largest hotel in Charlotte by number of rooms with 381 rooms. It opened August 17, 2021.
65	112 Tryon Plaza		280 / 85.3	22	1927	Charlotte	Tallest building constructed in Charlotte in the 1920s.
67	Bell Uptown Charlotte		278 / 84.9	22	2014	Charlotte	22-story 352-unit apartment tower across the street from Romare Bearden Park, developed by Childress Klein. It was sold to Bell Partners in June 2022 for $165 million.
68	BB&T Financial Center		273 / 83.2	21	1987	Winston-Salem	Former BB&T Headquarters
69	Raleigh Crossing-Office Tower		272 / 83	19	2022	Raleigh	Phase 1 of the Raleigh Crossing development. Headquarters of Pendo. With 292,457 square feet (27,170.1 m^{2}) of leasable space it is the eleventh largest office building in the triangle area.
70	The Howard R. Levine Center for Education		270 / 82.2	14	2025	Charlotte	It will be the Wake Forest University School of Medicine Charlotte campus main education tower containing medical school classrooms.
71	RJR Plaza Building		269 / 82	12	1929	Winston-Salem	
72	Harrah's Cherokee Casino & Hotel		267 / 81	22	2012	Cherokee	Tallest building outside of any major metro area
73	The Dillon		266 / 81	20	1927	Raleigh	The building was built on the 2.5-acre occupies the former Dillon Supply warehouse. It cost $150 million to build. In November 2020 Kane Realty sold the building for $236. In July 2022 the UNC system announced it be occupied two floors in the building. Tallest building in the Warehouse District.
73	Bank of America Tower		266 / 81	18	2016	Raleigh	Bank of America, Merrill Lynch and U.S. Trust moved their operations and employees from downtown to occupy 57,000 square feet (5,300 m^{2}) in the 300,000 square feet (28,000 m^{2}) building, which had 44% occupancy before it opened in the spring of 2016. With 284,892 square feet (26,467.3 m^{2}) of leasable space it is the twelfth largest office building in the triangle area.
75	The Holston at The Weld		265 / 80.7	20	2025	Raleigh	2 tower developments with a total of 657 apartments near Dix Park. It will be the first of two phases. The first phase broke ground in June 2023, the towers delivered in summer 2025.
75	Ray at The Weld		265 / 80.7	20	2025	Raleigh	2 tower developments with a total of 657 apartments near Dix Park. It will be the first of two phases. The first phase broke ground in June 2023, the towers delivered in summer 2025.
77	Skyhouse Raleigh	SkyHouse Raleigh looking east during sunrise	264 / 81	23	2015	Raleigh	It became the tallest apartment building in Raleigh when it was completed in 2015.
77	The Ascher Uptown Apartments North Tower		264 / 80.5	24	2015	Charlotte	One of two twin residential towers that combined feature 672 apartments, which makes the complex the 5th largest apartment complex in the Charlotte area.
77	The Ascher Uptown Apartments South Tower		264 / 80.5	24	2017	Charlotte	One of two twin residential towers that combined feature 672 apartments, which makes the complex the 5th largest apartment complex in the Charlotte area.
80	Regions 615		260 / 79.1	19	2017	Charlotte	
80	Captrust Tower		260 / 79.1	17	2009	Raleigh	
82	Advance Auto Parts Tower		257 / 78	20	2020	Raleigh	With 328,648 square feet (30,532.4 m^{2}) of leasable space it is the eight largest office building in the triangle area.
83	Renaissance Plaza		256 / 78	19	1989	Greensboro	
84	Charlotte Marriott City Center		252 / 76.8	19	1984	Charlotte	The Charlotte Marriott City Center was built as a part of the $120 million 101 Independence Center and hotel project developed by Henry Faison. The hotel sits on the land of the former White House Inn. Faison purchased the Marriott site in 1982 when the hotel was already vacant The Marriott is currently the second largest hotel in Charlotte by number of rooms with 446 rooms.
84	The Tower at Mutual Plaza		252 / 76.8	20	1965	Durham	Headquarters of N.C Mutual Life Insurance. Tallest building in Durham from 1965 to 1986.
86	129 West Trade		250 / 76.2	17	1958	Charlotte	Tallest building constructed in Charlotte in the 1950s.
87	Nissen Building		246 / 75	20	1927	Winston-Salem	Tallest building in Winston-Salem from 1927 to 1929.
88	400H		244 / 74.4	20	2023	Raleigh	144,000 SF office space, 16,000 SF retail, and 242 apartments
89	Cardinal North Hills – East Tower		241 / 73.5	18	2014	Raleigh	Located in the North Hills area, this high rise development features 191 residential units for seniors.
89	Wake County Public Safety Center		241 / 73.5	17	1991	Raleigh	
91	Le Méridien Charlotte		238 / 72.5	18	1973	Charlotte	The hotel was previously part of the Blake Hotel, which had 605 rooms. In early 2015 the former hotel completed a $20 million renovation to become The Sheraton with 305 room and Le Méridien with 300. Le Méridien is the 11th largest hotel in Charlotte.
91	Sonesta Charlotte Lower South End		238 / 72.5	18	1983	Charlotte	It has 300 rooms and is ranked as the 11th largest hotel in Charlotte.
91	North Hills Tower 5		238 / 72.5	18	2025	Raleigh	An 18-story office tower with 322,232 square feet (29,936.3 m^{2}) located in the North Hills Innovation District.
94	Marriott Winston Plaza Hotel		237 / 72.2	19	1984	Winston-Salem	Tallest full-service hotel in Winston-Salem
95	Jefferson Standard Building		233 / 71	18	1923	Greensboro	Tallest building in Greensboro from 1923 to 1989
95	Center Pointe		233 / 71	16	1966	Greensboro	
97	Buncombe County Courthouse		230 / 70.1	16	1928	Asheville	
97	The Francis Apartments		230 / 70.1	19	1973	Charlotte	
97	Liberty Plaza		230 / 70.1	14	1973	Winston-Salem	
100	The Arras		228 / 69.4	19	1965	Asheville	
101	Kimpton Tryon Park		226 / 69	18	2017	Charlotte	It has 217 rooms and is ranked as the 25th largest hotel in the Charlotte area.
101	Bond on Mint		226 / 69	17	2025	Charlotte	It is a 17-story apartment building located at the corner of Mint St and Morehead St in South End with 393 units.
103	Ritz-Carlton Charlotte		225 / 69.1	17	2009	Charlotte	150 room hotel built by Bank of America for $500 million combined cost for 1 Bank of America Center and the hotel.
103	Johnston Building		225 / 69.1	17	1924	Charlotte	It was the tallest building in Charlotte when completed. The building was designated as a historic landmark by the Charlotte-Mecklenburg Historic Landmarks Commission in 1992. In December 2024 Charlotte City Council approved a redevelopment of the entire building to become a 245-room hotel.
103	Janeway Clinical Sciences Tower		225 / 68.6	18	1987	Winston-Salem	
106	Uptown 550		223 / 68	21	2019	Charlotte	21 story apartment tower that along with a 6-story building contains 421 apartments. It was developed and owned by Northwood Ravin. The building broke ground in December 2016 and was completed in October 2019. The project cost was $82.151 million, and it sits on a 3.76-acre site in Uptown Charlotte.
106	Durham Centre		223 / 68	18	1987	Durham	3rd tallest building in Durham
108	Capital Bank Plaza		221 / 67.4	15	1964	Raleigh	
109	Charlotte-Mecklenburg Government Center		214 / 65.2	14	1988	Charlotte	
110	Charter Square		213 / 65	11	2015	Raleigh	Platinum LEED certified.
110	Sheraton Capital Center		213 / 65	17	2008	Raleigh	The hotel was purchased by Oaktree Capital and Northview Hotel in October 2012 for undisclosed sum. Previously it was purchased by Genwood Raleigh LLC in 2006 for $22 million. The hotel has 353 guest rooms, which makes it the third largest hotel in the Triangle. With 353 rooms it is the second largest hotel in the triangle by number of rooms.
110	The Maeve		213 / 64.9	20	2025	Raleigh	The buildings features 297 apartments and 10,000 square feet of retail space. The 1.32-acre lot made up of three parcel, was purchased by Capital Square in April 2020 for $4.2 million. The total project cost is expected to be $121 million. The project will deliver in summer 2024.
113	440 South Church		212 / 64.7	16	2009	Charlotte	
113	Towerview at Ballantyne		212 / 64.7	16	2021	Charlotte	Announced in October 2019 by Northwood Ravin as Ballantyne Corporate Park's first apartment tower. The 16-story building with an attached low-rise building have 212 apartments. It delivered in the spring of 2021. The building was part of the early stages of Ballantyne Reimagined.
113	The Line		212 / 64.7	16	2022	Charlotte	A 16-story building developed by Portman on a 2.2-acre lot next to the current location of Scycamore Brewing. The brewery will move next store to be its anchor tenant. Foundry Commercial will be the first tenant of the building starting on May 16, 2022.
113	Park Central		212 / 64.7	16	2017	Raleigh	Apartment building in North Hills with 286 apartments across 252,204 square feet (23,430.5 m^{2}) including 36,400 square feet (3,380 m^{2}) of ground floor retail. Completed in September 2017.
117	One West Fourth		211 / 64.3	13	2002	Winston-Salem	Tallest building constructed in Winston-Salem in the 2000s
118	Duke Chapel		210 / 64		1935	Durham	Tallest building in Durham from 1935 to 1937.
119	Grandover Resort & Spa	Grandover Resort & Spa, A Wyndham Grand Hotel	208 / 64	12	1999	Greensboro	
120	Wake County Office Building		206 / 62.8	15	2007	Raleigh	
121	Hill Building		202 / 61.6	17	1937	Durham	21c Hotel. Tallest building in Durham from 1937 to 1965.
122	Capitol Towers North		200 / 60.9	10	2017	Charlotte	Developed by Charlotte-based Lincoln Harris, located in South Park on a 6 acres (2.4 ha) site behind Piedmont Town Center. Each building contains 240,000 square feet (22,000 m^{2}) of office space. The towers were built as speculative buildings, with no tenants signed on prior to construction.
122	Capitol Towers South		200 / 60.9	10	2015	Charlotte	Developed by Charlotte-based Lincoln Harris, located in South Park on a 6 acres (2.4 ha) site behind Piedmont Town Center. Each building contains 240,000 square feet (22,000 m^{2}) of office space. The towers were built as speculative buildings, with no tenants signed on prior to construction.
122	Quorum Center		200 / 60.9	15	2007	Raleigh	Building received damage from the Metropolitan apartment complex fire on March 16, 2017.

== Tallest under construction ==
This lists buildings that are under construction in North Carolina and are planned to rise at least 200 ft (61 m). Buildings that have already been topped out are also included. As of November 2026, there are 14 such buildings under construction.

Name	Image	Height ft (m)	Floors	Year	City	Notes
1111 South Tryon		540 / 164.5	43	2028	Charlotte	Mixed-use tower with 400,000 square feet (37,000 m^{2}) of office space across the top 19 floors and 304 apartments across the lower floors. It is the second phase of Queensbridge Collective. Upon completion it will be the 26th largest office building in Charlotte and the largest in South End.
Centrum Dilworth		437 / 133.1	33	2029	Charlotte	The building will be mixed use containing 420 apartments and 32,000 square feet (3,000 m^{2}) of office space. It is being developed by Centrum Realty & Development and Sorelle Capital on an 1.8 acres (0.73 ha) lot at the corner of Worthington Ave and South Blvd. The property was purchased by the developers in 2021.
1200 Metropolitan		357 / 108.8	27	2027	Charlotte	Northwood Ravin is planning to build a 27-story 283-unit apartment tower at the corner of Metropolitan Avenue and South Kings Drive. In 2020 Northwood purchased the 1.3 acres (0.53 ha) site for $2.25 million from J.P. Morgan Chase & Co. The rezoning was approving in April 2021 originally for 330 apartments. It will broke ground in early 2024.
1320 South Tryon		292 / 89	14	2028	Charlotte	White Lodging is developing a 14 story 295 room hotel on a .63 acre lot in South End. The company purchased the lot in December 2023 for $8. It broke ground in July 2026.
Anova The Pearl		240 / 73.1	20	2029	Charlotte	The building is a 20-story apartment building being built at The Pearl with 382 units, with 19 units reserved for low-income residents. In 2021 Atrium promised that affordable housing would be a part of the district. Construction will begin in August 2026.
4415 Sharon		225 / 68.5	15	2028	Charlotte	Amwins is building a 250,000 square feet (23,000 m^{2}) headquarters building in SouthPark. The building will have 9 floors of offices space over 6 stories of parking. Amwins' 500 employees will move into the 7 floors in the forth quarter of 2028
Highline Glenwood		403 / 122.8	37	2028	Raleigh	Initially planned to rise to 32 stories, but modified in 2022. The building experienced permit delays in 2023, and is now expected to start in August 2025. It will have 306 Residential units, and it will be the first phase of Highline Glenwood. The developer Turnbridge Equities, has secured financing for the project. Once complete, it is expected to be the tallest residential building in the city.
The Strand		265 / 80.772	20	2027	Raleigh	A 20-story residential tower has been ground at a former parking lot next to the Advanced Auto Parts Tower. It with have 362 apartments and 9,000 square feet (840 m^{2}) of ground-level retail.
East Civic Tower		258 feet (79 m)	17	2026	Raleigh	It will be a city hall complex in downtown, which will consolidate most of the city functions into one building. The building is located at 110 S McDowell St, the former Raleigh Police Department headquarters. It will contain 370,000 square feet (34,000 m^{2}) of space.
Life Time Living Raleigh		265 feet (81 m)	20	2028	Raleigh	Groundbreaking October 29, 2026. It is a 20-story building containing a 80,000 square feet (7,400 m^{2}) Life Time Fitness location, 289 apartment units, and a 40,000 square feet (3,700 m^{2}) rooftop beach club. Construction will start in early 2026.
Omni Raleigh		384 / 117.043	29	2028	Raleigh	It is a 29-story hotel containing 600 rooms and 20,000 square feet (1,900 m^{2}) of retail. The site is located on former surface parking directly across the street from the Martin Marietta Center for the Performing Arts in downtown Raleigh. It broke ground in February 2026 and it will deliver near the end of 2028
Union West		304 / 92.6	23	2026	Raleigh	Initial planned for two towers, 32-stories. Now a single, 23-story building.
Carroll South of the Ballpark		265 / 80.7	20		Greensboro	An office building containing 200,000 square feet (19,000 m^{2}), including 150 Aloft hotel, 280 apartments, and 30,000 square feet (2,800 m^{2}) of retail. The project will cost $140 million. It broke ground in December 2020.
Catawba Two Kings Casino Hotel Tower		318 / 96.9	24	2027	Kings Mountain	It will be a casino hotel tower with 385 rooms that will be part of the Catawba Two Kings Casino complex.

== Approved ==
This lists buildings that are approved or on hold in North Carolina that are planned to rise at least 200 ft (61 m).

Name	Height* ft / m	Floors	Year	Status	Primary Purpose	City	Notes
900 South McDowell	238 / 72.5	18	2027	Approved	Residential	Charlotte	Northwood Ravin is developing an 18-story 328 unit apartment building at 900 South McDowell, right next to The Pearl. The developer purchased the 1.3 acre property for $11.25 million in June 2025 from Duncan-Parnell. The building should break ground in 2026.
Southern Land Company Residential Tower	437 / 133.1	33	2028	Approved	Residential	Charlotte	It is a mixed-use tower with 300 luxury apartments that will be built on the current site of Tyber Creek Pub. It is being developed by Southern Land Company on an 1 acre (0.40 ha) lot at the corner of Tremont Ave and South Blvd which combines lots 1919, 1923 and 1933 South Blvd. The historic building at 1923 South Blvd., which is part of the land purchased by Southern Land Company, will be relocated to 1829 Cleveland Ave. Tyber Creek closed on March 18, 2024. Grounding breaking is planned for late 2026.
The Gallery Office Tower	275 / 83.8	19		Approved	Office	Charlotte	On 3.87 acre site in SouthPark currently occupied by single-story retail building Hines is planning a 250,000 square feet (23,000 m^{2}) office tower.
The Gallery Mixed Use Tower	275 / 83.8	19		Approved	Mixed Use	Charlotte	On 3.87 acre site in SouthPark currently occupied by single-story retail building Hines is planning a 19 story 302 apartments and 50,000 square feet (4,600 m^{2}) of retail space with a significant portion of that space being on the ground floor to create an activated plaza.
VeLa Uptown	368 / 112.1	32	2025	Approved	Residential	Charlotte	379 luxury apartments which are being developed at 200 E. Seventh St., former site of the Levine Museum of the New South. The .7 acres (0.28 ha) site at the corner of East Seventh and North College was purchased on March 13, 2022, for $10.75 million. It will also include 4,000 square feet (370 m^{2}) of retail and 20,000 square feet (1,900 m^{2}) of resident amenity space. The project cost is $170 million. Construction will begin in 2025 and complete in the 4th quarter of 2026.
401 South College			2027	Approved	Residential	Charlotte	Animal investment firm and Millennium Venture Capital in December 2022 purchased the building for $24 million. The site is 2.3 acres. However, Charlotte Regional Visitors authority swapped a 1.9-acre parcel at 501 South Caldwell St for a .7-acre parcel on the site at the corner of College Street and Martin Luther King Jr. Blvd. A 1.6-acre site remains available for the development, which will be divided into two parcels. On one of the parcels will be a high-rise multifamily tower with 350 to 400 units. Construction is expected to start in late 2025.
Camden Exchange	398 / 121.3	30	2024	Approved	Residential	Charlotte	Apartment tower with 315 units, 10,000 square feet (930 m^{2}) of ground floor retail, and 10,000 square feet (930 m^{2}) of office space occupied by Catalyst. It is being developed by Catalyst Capital Partners and Stiles Corp. It is planned on the former site of Price's Chicken Coop located at 1600 and 1604 Camden Road. It will break ground in October 2022.
Carson & Tryon	411 / 125.2	31	2025	Approved	Mixed Use	Charlotte	It is a 31-story mixed use tower with 565,000 square feet (52,500 m^{2}) of office space, 200 room hotel, 10,000 square feet (930 m^{2}) of retail, and 200 residential units. The 3 acres (1.2 ha) site is currently occupied by an Enterprise Rent-A-Car location at the corner of Carson and Tryon at 1102 S Tryon St. The developers Crescent Communities and Nuveen Real Estate paid $37 million for the four parcels from different owners that make up the site. Crescent Communities applied for building permits with Mecklenburg County on October 14, 2024, although a ground breaking date has not been set. In October 2024 it was reported by the Charlotte Business Journal that Charlotte's largest law firm Moore & Van Allen will anchor the building. However, Moore & Van Allen agreed to anchor 1111 South Tryon instead.
205 E Bland St	265 / 80.7	20	2026	Approved	Mixed Use	Charlotte	Cousins Properties is planning a 200,000 square feet (19,000 m^{2}) office building on a .9-acre parking lot. The building will also include ground-floor retail and onsite parking. The lot was purchased in November 2020 as part of a larger $28.1 million deal that also gave Cousins nearby parking lot 1401 S. Tryon St. and 200 E. Bland St.
1427 South Blvd	411 / 125.2	31	2026	Approved	Multifamily	Charlotte	Washington, D.C. developer Akridge and Virginia-based property management company Kettler are developing a 31-story, 450-unit apartment building on a .9-acre lot. The building will also include ground-level retail, a resort-style pool, fitness center, and co-working space. The companies purchased the lot on December 20, 2022, for $13.5 million. It is currently occupied by businesses Modern Man, Savvy Seconds Consignment, Fresh Nails, Lucky Fish and Destined To Make It.
Intercontinental Hotel at Belk Place	451 / 137.4	34	2026	Approved	Hotel	Charlotte	244 room luxury hotel, construction started in February 2018, on hold due to the COVID-19 pandemic's effect on the Charlotte hotel business Will become the tallest hotel in the Southern United States outside of Atlanta upon completion. The hotel developer, Salter Brothers, announced in June 2023 the project is back on track. Construction will start in summer 2024 and complete in mid-2026.
South End Station Building 1	212 / 76.5	16		Approved	Mixed Use	Charlotte	Cousins Properties is planning a two building 700,000 square feet (65,000 m^{2}) mixed use complex at 200 E Bland; where All American Pub, Hot Taco and Slate are currently located. The complex will include a potential 300 multifamily units, retail and office space. The lot was purchased in November 2020 as part of a larger $28.1 million deal that also gave Cousins nearby parking lots 1401 S. Tryon St. and 205 E. Bland St.
South End Station Building 2	212 / 76.5	16		Approved	Mixed Use	Charlotte	Cousins Properties is planning a two building 700,000 square feet (65,000 m^{2}) mixed use complex at 200 E Bland; where All American Pub, Hot Taco and Slate are currently located. The complex will include multifamily, retail and office space. The lot was purchased in November 2020 as part of a larger $28.1 million deal that also gave Cousins nearby parking lots 1401 S. Tryon St. and 205 E. Bland St.
1426 S Tryon St.	265 / 80.7	20		Approved	Mixed Use	Charlotte	Highwoods Properties Inc. in May 2022 purchased the lot across the street from the Railyard for $27 million. Currently occupying the site is a low-rise building containing an ABC store. A mixed-use building with 300,000 square feet (28,000 m^{2}) of office space and 250 apartments is planned.
1435 South Tryon	318 / 80.7	24		Approved	Mixed Use	Charlotte	Cousins Properties is planning a 24 story mixed tower on the site of a surface parking lot. It will have office space and a multifamily component. The land was part of a 2.2 acre $20 million purchase in November 2020 that also included 200 East Bland. The development of 1435 South Tryon and 200 East Bland will break ground in a year or two.
1175 Pearl Park Way	275 / 83.82			Approved	Residential	Charlotte	Pappas Properties is a planning a three-building development in midtown that is the final phase of a multi-phase development in the area. The three buildings include a 275-foot apartment tower with 425 units, 150-room hotel, 100,000 square feet (9,300 m^{2}) of office space, 35,000 square feet (3,300 m^{2}) of retail on a 2.2-acre lot.
The Nash (Tower 1)		40		Approved	Mixed-Use	Raleigh	Multi-use building planned for downtown Raleigh located near Nash Square.
The Nash (Tower 2)		40		Approved	Mixed-Use	Raleigh	Multi-use building planned for downtown Raleigh located near Nash Square.
Raleigh Convention Hotel and Downtown Development Project (Tower 1)	530 / 161.5	40	2026	Approved	Hospitality	Raleigh	Planned to be constructed near Raleigh's convention center and performing arts center. Expected to have at least 500 rooms. Originally expected to be completed in 2028, the project completion deadline can be moved to 2026 if desired.
Raleigh Convention Hotel and Downtown Development Project (Tower 2)	530 / 161.5	40	2026	Approved	Office/Mixed-Use	Raleigh	Planned to be constructed near Raleigh's convention center and performing arts center. Originally expected to be completed in 2028, the project completion deadline can be moved to 2026 if desired.
Vela LongView	336 / 102	30	2025	Approved	Mixed-Use	Raleigh	Will have 524,568 Sq Ft for residential units and retail spaces. To begin construction in mid-2023.
Heritage Square redevelopment Residential Tower		18		Approved	Residential	Durham	It is a 328-unit residential tower that is part of the two-tower development in phase one of Heritage Square redevelopment. The site is composed of 9.5 acres near downtown Durham

== See also ==
- List of tallest buildings in Asheville
- List of tallest buildings in Charlotte
- List of tallest buildings in Greensboro
- List of tallest buildings in Raleigh
- List of tallest buildings in Winston-Salem
- List of tallest buildings in the United States
- List of tallest buildings by U.S. state
