= The Line (development) =

Office building in Charlotte, North Carolina

Coordinates: 35°12′33″N 80°51′44″W

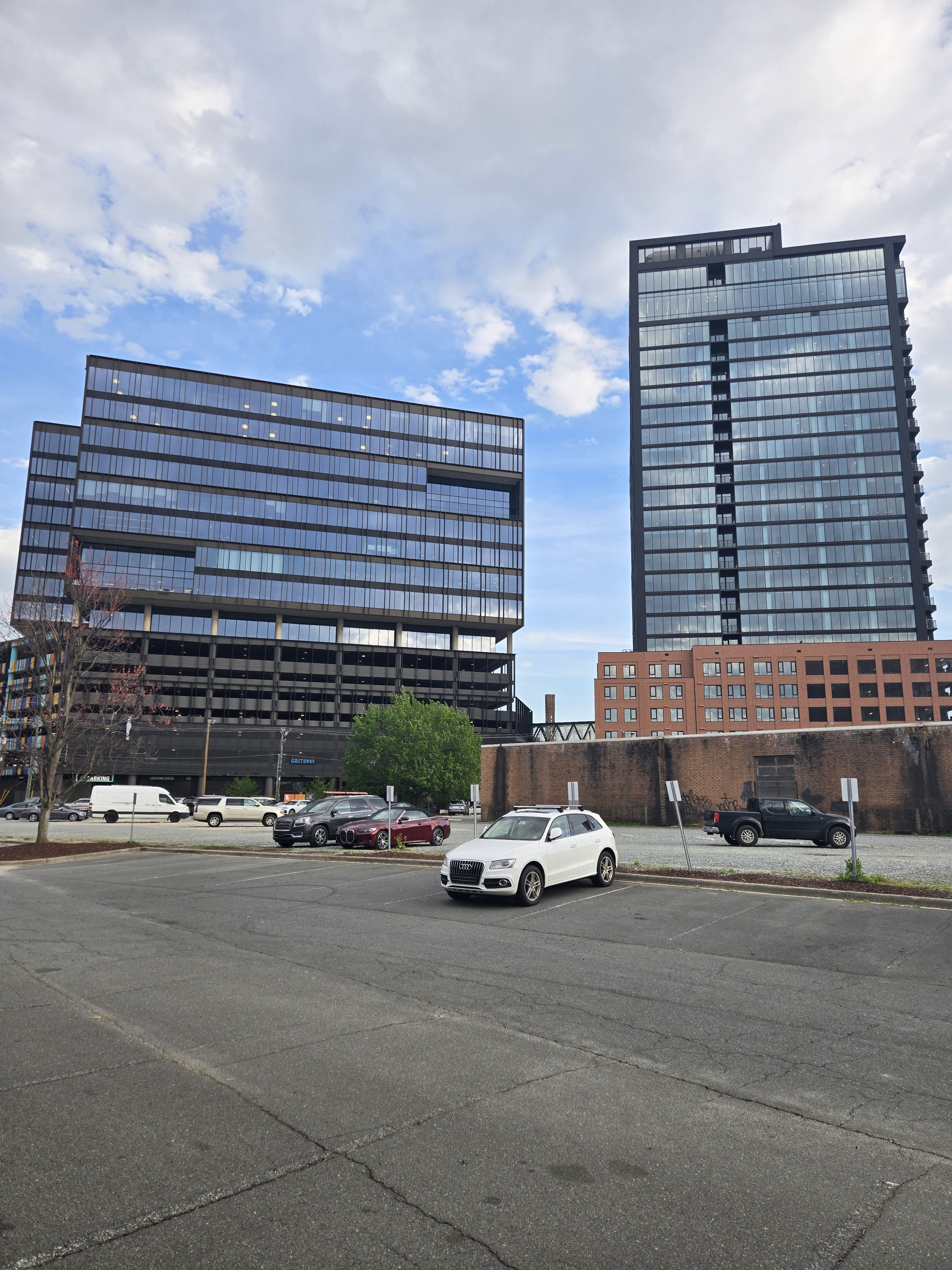
- The Line on the left along with Linea on the right in March 2025.
- Interactive map of The Line
- Location: 2151 Hawkins, Charlotte, North Carolina
- Status: Complete
- Groundbreaking: Fall 2019
- Opening: May 3, 2021
- Website: thelineclt.com

Companies
- Architect: Gensler
- Developer: Portman Holdings

Technical details
- Buildings: The Line, Linea
- Size: 3.7 acres

The Line is a completed 2 building development of a composed of a 16-story office building in South End Charlotte, North Carolina, which stands at a height of 212 feet (65 m) Linea is a 24-story apartment tower being developed by Portman Residential with 370 units along with 18,700 square feet (1,737 m^{2}) of ground floor retail.

== History ==
The recent history of The Line began in March 2000 when Shook Design Group and Whelchel & Associates Inc. purchased a previous industrial building, built in 1957. The 2.21-acre lot and the building were sold for $1.6 million. At the time of the sale it was occupied by Grice Showcase & Display Manufacturing Co.

The Shook building was initially put on the market March 6, 2018. Portman Holdings bought the plot along with the 1.5-acre plot at 2161 Hawkins for $12.7M in October 2018. At the time of the sale Shook Kelley leased the 27,045 square feet (2,513 m^{2}) building on the lot. Shortly after the land was sold it was announced that a 260,000 square feet (24,155 m^{2}) mixed-used building would be constructed on the 2151 Hawkins site.

The recent history of Linea began in October 2013 when Sycamore Brewing signed a lease for the 1.62-acre property which contained a 8,000 square feet (743 m^{2}) building that was previously an auto garage. Then in September 2015 Sycamore Brewing owners Justin and Sarah Brigham purchased the property for an undisclosed price.

== The Line ==
The building contains 318,000 square feet (29,543 m^{2}) of space. Of the 16 floors 9 are dedicated to office space for a total of 285,000 square feet (26,477 m^{2}) of Class A office space. The building will border the rail trail in South End south of the East/West Blvd Station.

In May 2020 Portman Holdings secured a $95.6 million construction loan with PCCP, a real estate finance and investment management firm. This was the fourth construction loan PCCP has extended to Portman Holdings. PCCP was also Portman's construction lender for the building Regions 615 in Uptown Charlotte.

Sycamore Brewing is the anchor tenant of the building. Sycamore co-owner Sarah Brigham said this about the project, "We are beyond excited to be a part of this amazingly cool space. With an expansive beer garden, second-story patio, house-roasted coffee offering, and a dynamic chef-driven food and beverage program, this experience is going to be second to none in the Queen City". Sycamore features 10,000 square feet (929 m^{2}) of space on 2 levels with another 16,000 square feet (1,486 m^{2}) of space for a rooftop beer garden and outdoor area along the rail trail. It will also include four bars. The expanded space will allow Sycamore to have live music in two locations on the rail trail and rooftop beer garden, a coffee shop that will also serve pastries and sandwiches, a taproom that is 5 times than the size of their former taproom, and an enhanced beer selection. In early October 2022 Sycamore Brewing closed its taproom next store to allow the new 2161 Hawkins apartment building to break ground. Their space in The Line opened May 31, 2023.

The building features 15,000 square feet (1,394 m^{2}) of retail and restaurant space, mostly on the first floor. The ground floor is intended to be a gathering spot. The location of the rail trail enhances this intent since the trail stays busy with a continuous stream of bicyclists, walkers, transit riders and visitors. Foundry Commercial believes that both retail and office tenants of the building will benefit from the energy of the rail trail.

One of the other retail tenants of the first floor is Chapter 6, a restaurant by Jon Dressler, occupying 6,000 square feet (557 m^{2}) in the building. Dressler is the owner of Rare Roots Hospitality the company's current restaurants in the Charlotte area include Dressler's in midtown, The Porter's House in south Charlotte, Fin & Fino in uptown, and Dogwood Southern Table in South Park. Chapter 6 will feature Mediterranean, Morocco, and southern Spain cuisines. Dressler expects to invest $2 million into the restaurant. Its opening date is September 20, 2023.

Another retailer that will that occupy 15,000 square feet (1,394 m^{2}) of the retail is Savi Provisions with 3,613 square feet (336 m^{2}). It is an Atlanta-based restaurant featuring locally grown gourmet and organic food. In addition to its indoor space the restaurant will have a 1,600 square feet (149 m^{2}) patio. The restaurant is expected to open in late 2023.

The final retail space will be occupied by Grit Box Fitness, occupying 2,940 square feet (273 m^{2}). Grit Box focuses on high intensity kickboxing and strength training. The studio will offer 45 intensity classes. Cody Cooper, company founder said this about the studio “We are excited to deliver a fitness experience that makes working out fun and exciting. We want everyone — beginner and advanced — to walk out of every class feeling more confident and motivated to get what they want out of life”. The studio planned to open in the summer of 2022.

Foundry Commercial moved their Charlotte office from 10,000 square feet (929 m^{2}) at 121 West Trade in Uptown to the 10th floor of the building to occupy 15,000 square feet (1,394 m^{2}) on May 16, 2022, to become the first tenant of the building. The company currently has 80 employees in the Charlotte area, 60 of which work from the office. The space will include 70 desks. Additional building permits for office space include Northeastern University Charlotte, Home Instead, CPA firm Frazier & Deeter, Golden Ticket and The Passage.

In June 2022 The Line was purchased for $206 million by CBRE Investment Management of New York City. At the time of purchase the building was less than 50% leased. Mike McDonald of Cushman & Wakefield, who represented the seller, said this about the transaction: "CBRE has a wealth of capital they’re trying to place in high-growth markets, and the fact that it’s less than 50% leased created a great opportunity for value-add rent, it is a really awesome and new creative office building at a drop-a-pin location in South End Charlotte. I think it's the best building in Charlotte and a top-10 building in the Southeast."

In March 2023 IT staffing firm Experis signed a lease for 23,610 square feet (2,193 m^{2}) on the 12th floor. This lease brought the building's occupancy to 52%. In June 2023 the building added two new tenants. Atlanta-based SignatureFD will be leasing 3,700 square feet (340 m^{2}) on the 10th floor. SignatureFD choose The Line due to it being a vibrant destination that is walkable to restaurants and amenities, also it convenient to multiple business districts in Charlotte. New York-based design studio Society Awards will lease 4,000 square feet (370 m^{2}) on the 12th floor. With these two leases the building is 54% occupied.

Chicago based TTX, a railcar company, announced it will be leasing 70,000 square feet (6,500 m^{2}) in the building. In August 2023 City Council approved $323,007 of incentives over a seven-year period for the company's relocation from Chicago to Charlotte. TTX's investment in the move is $14.5 million for 150 jobs in Charlotte. Around 100 jobs will be employees relocating from Chicago. The remaining 50 jobs will be new hires. The office space is being designed by Gensler and it will be completed in the spring 2024. TTX's lease brings the building occupancy to 65%. In September 20224 TTX announced it will rent an additional 15,000 square feet (1,400 m^{2}) of space bringing its total space to 85,000 square feet (7,900 m^{2}) across three floors. TTX's expansion brought the building to 85% occupancy. Another major tenant was signed in May 2025 Mecklenburg county permits filed revealed that Capital One Financial will occupy the entire 13th, which is 34,500 square feet (3,210 m^{2}) of space. This lease brings the building occupancy to 95%.

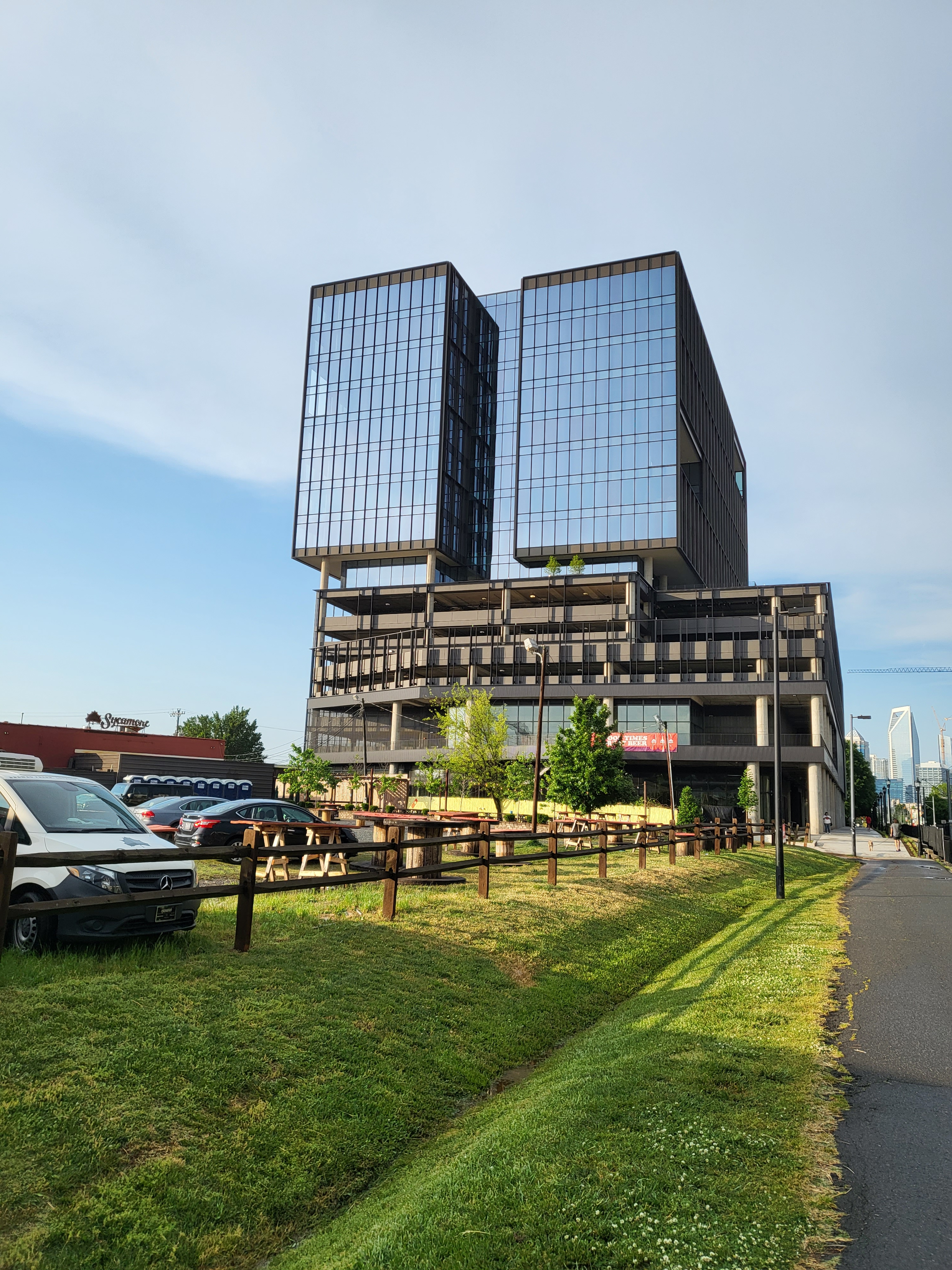
The Line in May 2022

== Linea ==
Construction began in mid-October 2022 after Sycamore Brewing moved out of the building. Construction will last two years with a scheduled opening of the third quarter 2024. Apartment amenities will include concierge service, a rooftop pool, co-working spaces, a game room, climbing wall, indoor and outdoor fitness centers The two lots will likely have a common outdoor plaza. Also, a fourth-floor bridge will connect the two buildings. The developer stated the goal of the project is to develop a building that complements the Line.

As of April 2023, several food and drink tenants of the 18,700 square feet (1,737 m^{2}) ground floor retail have been announced. Night Swim coffee will open its sixth Charlotte location with a 623 square feet (58 m^{2}) space. Bar One South End will lease 2,389 square feet (222 m^{2}) and will open in the fourth quarter of 2024. The Bar One location is part of a $10 million expansion with a location in Lake Norman also planned. True Food Kitchen will be occupying 5,200 square feet (483 m^{2}). The restaurant is a wellness driven concept marketed to an educated and higher income demographic. With the announcement of Night Swim there is 10,481 square feet (974 m^{2}) of the possible 18,700 square feet (1,737 m^{2}) ground floor retail is currently available. In April 2025 Half Shell, a seafood restaurant and raw bar, announced it will open a 3,221 square feet (299 m^{2}) space in the building by the end of 2025.

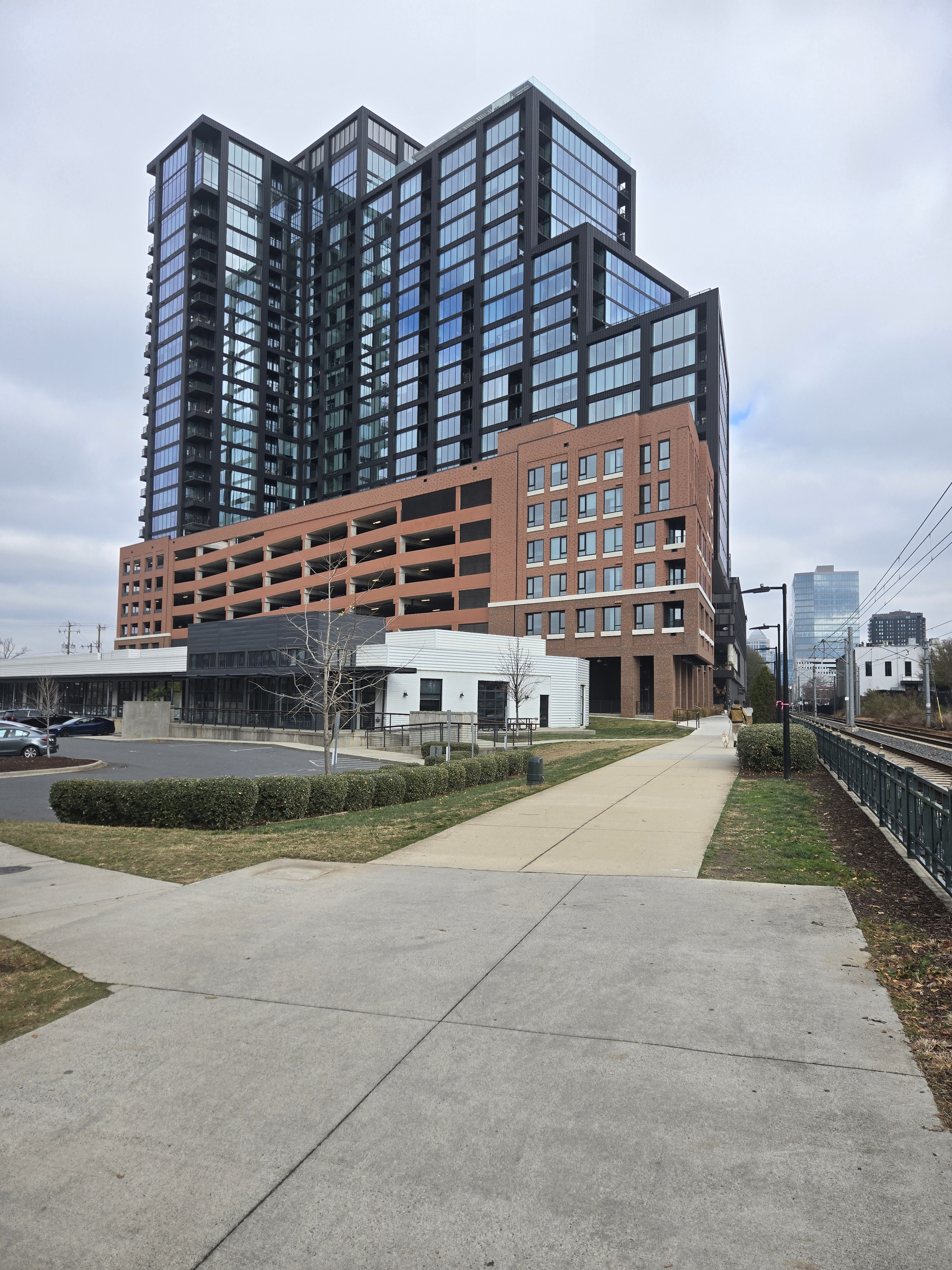
The completed building in December 2025

== See also ==
- List of tallest buildings in North Carolina / the United States / the world
- List of tallest buildings in Charlotte
