= 1 Bank of America Center =

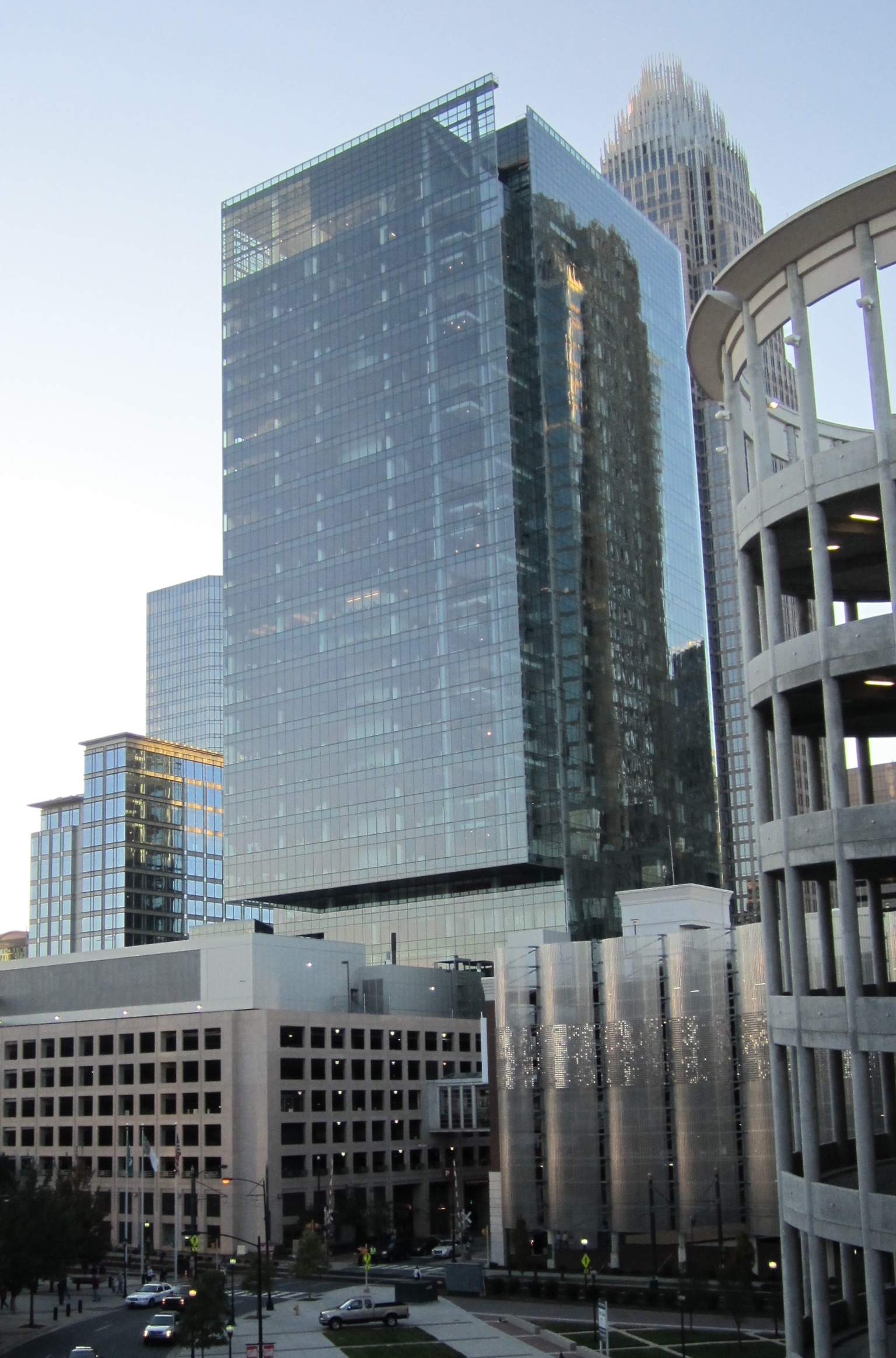

General information
- Status: Completed
- Type: Office building
- Location: 150 North College St, Charlotte, North Carolina, United States
- Coordinates: 35°13′35.3″N 80°50′26.4″W
- Construction started: 2007
- Opening: June 1, 2010
- Cost: $540 million

Height
- Roof: 484 feet (148 m)

Technical details
- Floor count: 32
- Floor area: 746,152 square feet (69,319.8 m^{2})

Design and construction
- Architect: Perkins+Will
- Structural engineer: Thornton Tomasetti
- Main contractor: Centex Construction
- Awards: LEED Gold Certification

Other information
- Public transit: CTC/Arena

1 Bank of America Center is a 484-foot (148 m) tall office high-rise in Charlotte, North Carolina, United States. It is the 9th-tallest building in North Carolina and was completed in 2010 with 32 stories. With 746,152 square feet (69,319.8 m^{2}) of leasable space, it is the 10th largest office building in Charlotte. It shares a second-story atrium with the adjacent Ritz-Carlton Hotel and is connected to the Bank of America Corporate Center by two skybridges, as part of the Overstreet Mall.

== History ==
The hotel and office building were announced by Bank of America in November 2006. Previously a developer was planning to build a hotel, office building, and retail project on the site. However, due to economic conditions the project never materialized. The project relieved fears that the bank would move its headquarters to New York City. The bank CEO Ken Lewis addressed these fears by saying "Speaking for my tenure, this will be the headquarters, and it will not be in New York." Initially the bank planned to occupy half of the 750,000 square feet (70,000 m^{2}) in the building and have it house 1,200 employees. The original construction cost estimate was $450 million. However, in June 2010 when the building opened the actual cost was $540 million for the building, hotel, and Founder's Hall renovations.

Construction began in 2007. The building was officially given the name 1 Bank of America Center on May 8, 2008. The building was built along with Ritz-Carlton Charlotte, which is a LEED Certified Gold hotel, the first in Charlotte. It is a Bank of America owned tower and was planned to be 95% occupied by the bank. Originally when it was built the bank was marketing 267,000 square feet (24,800 m^{2}) for leasing to be leased through Lincoln Harris. Private-equity firm Pamlico Capital leased 30,000 square feet (2,800 m^{2}) of that space. The bank decided to take the remaining 237,000 square feet (22,000 m^{2}) off the market to occupy itself. It officially opened June 1, 2010. However, bank employees started occupying the building in July 2010.

As of March 2011, the building was to be considered nearly fully occupied with only 40,000 square feet (3,700 m^{2}) available to lease. However, only 234,000 square feet (21,700 m^{2}) of the building was occupied. The bank had only occupied 21% 159,000 square feet (14,800 m^{2}) of the building and it had subleased 75,000 square feet (7,000 m^{2}) of its space. There were a couple possible reasons for this 1) The bank stated this about why they were holding to the space "to accommodate growth and optimize its space needs" 2) Analyst Andrew Jenkins of Karnes Research Co. stated this about holding onto the space "The impact of throwing all the space on the market at one time, as well as trying to determine how to consolidate, probably played heavily in their thinking on stating that they would be taking the entire building."

In October 2016 it was announced that Bank of America had been asking third party tenants in the building and in Bank of America Corporate Center if they would be willing to give up their space in the respective buildings. The bank offered to cover moving expenses for outgoing tenants. This action by the bank was part of a nationwide effort to shrink its real estate footprint. At the time of the article the bank had reduced its real estate square footage by 44,000,000 square feet (4,100,000 m^{2}). Also, the bank reduced the number of major real estate firms it works with from three to two. In August 2019 the bank began moving customer facing employees from the building and Bank of America Corporate Center to the Bank of America Tower where the bank would eventually occupy 23 of the 33 floors.

The building has a number of distinctive features that set it apart other buildings. It includes a lot of features natural light, live trees, lots of plants, use of recycled rainwater. It also has an urban garden that a six-story atrium between the building and the hotel that is open to the public. It also features a sixth-floor terrace that overlooks Trade and Tryon Street. It also hosts numerous conference rooms named after rivers and a 434-seat auditorium with broadcasting technology to host town halls broadcast to a wider bank audience. The 434-seat auditorium has also been used to host many board of director's meetings. In some cases these board meetings have drawn a lot of protesters, one such case was a May 2012 board meeting in the building drew 1,000 protestors.

== See also ==
- List of tallest buildings in Charlotte
- Uptown Charlotte
- Charlotte
- List of tallest buildings in North Carolina
