= Durham Centre =

Durham Centre or Durham Center may refer to:

- Durham Centre (Durham, North Carolina), a skyscraper
- Durham Centre (provincial electoral district), a defunct Canadian electoral district
- Durham Education Center, an alternative school in Tigard, Oregon
- Main Street Historic District (Durham, Connecticut), also known as Durham Center
