= Avenue (Charlotte) =

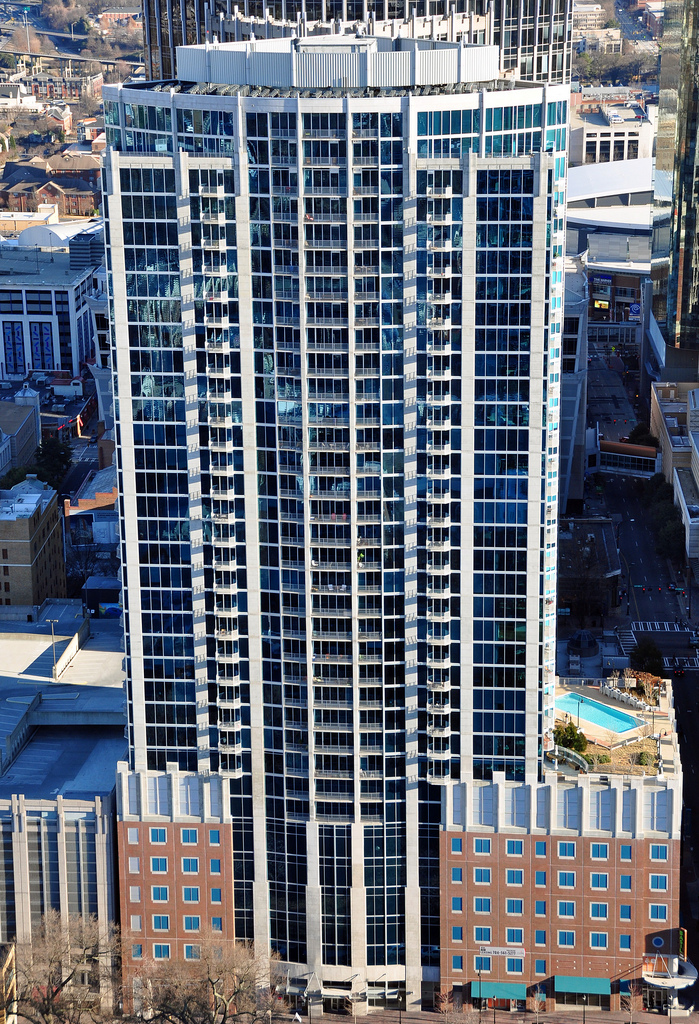
- Interactive map of the Avenue area

General information
- Status: Completed
- Type: Residential
- Location: 210 N Church St Charlotte, NC 28202
- Coordinates: 35.2290°N 80.8423°W
- Construction started: 2005-05-17
- Opening: 2007
- Management: FirstService Residential

Height
- Antenna spire: 425 feet (130 m)

Technical details
- Floor count: 36

Design and construction
- Developer: Novare

Avenue is a 425 feet (130 m) tall high rise in Charlotte, North Carolina. It was completed in 2007 and has 36 floors. Its construction began on May 17, 2005. It has 6,700 square feet (620 m^{2}) of retail space at street level. The average unit size of its 386 apartments is 900 sq ft (80 m^{2}). The 0.8 acres (3,237.5 m^{2}) site was originally proposed 201 North Tryon Residential Tower.

== See also ==
- List of tallest buildings in Charlotte
- List of tallest buildings in North Carolina
