= FNB Tower Charlotte =

Mixed-use skyscraper in Charlotte, North Carolina

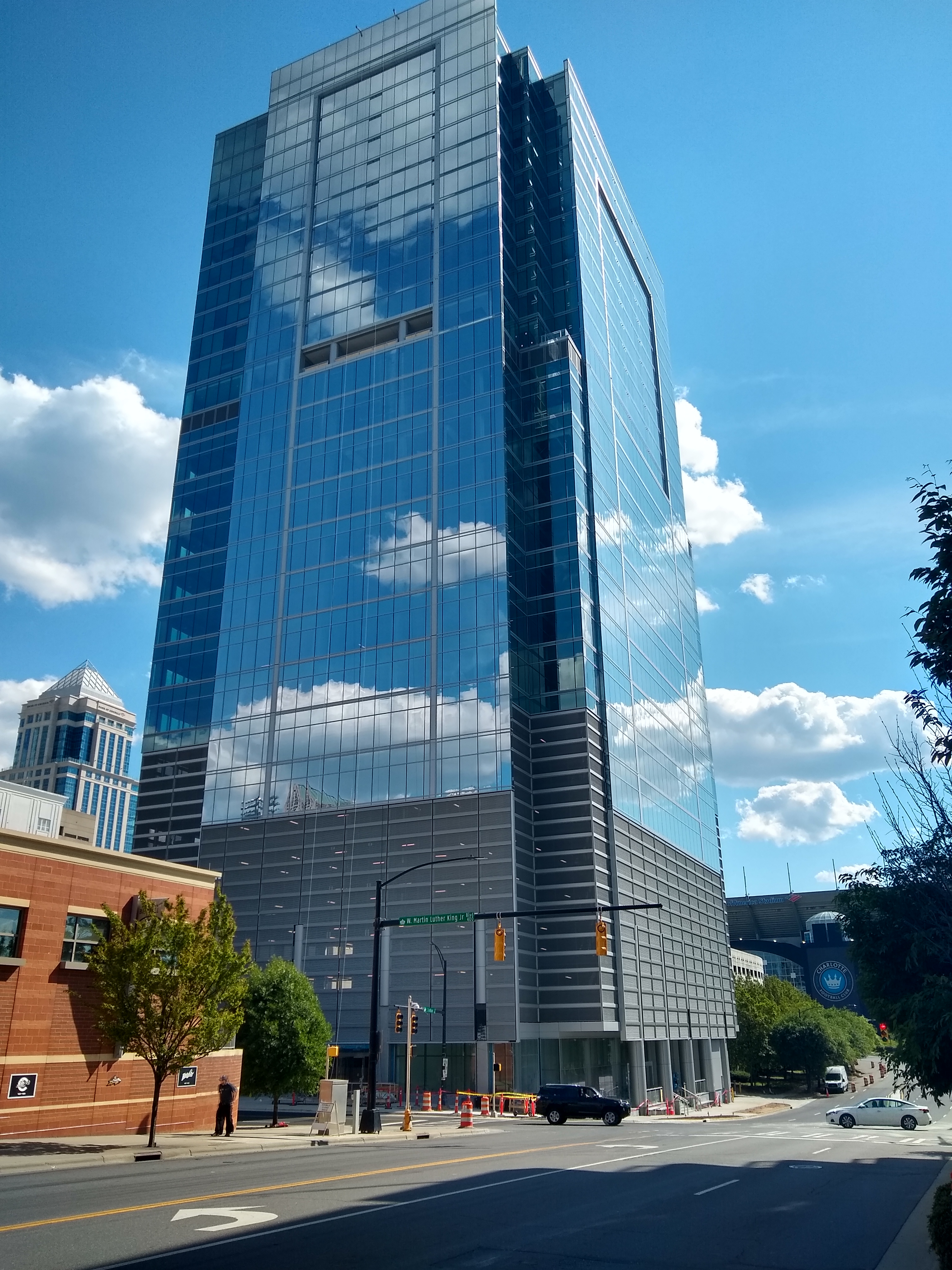

General information
- Status: Completed
- Location: 401 South Graham Street
- Coordinates: 35.22775086493363°N 80.85023513235375°W
- Construction started: December 2018
- Completed: July 2021
- Cost: $129 million
- Owner: Dominion Realty Partners

Height
- Height: 364 ft (111 m)

Technical details
- Floor count: 29
- Floor area: 420,000 sq ft

Design and construction
- Architect: Rule Joy Trammell + Rubio
- Developer: Dominion Realty Partners
- Main contractor: Batson-Cook Construction

FNB Tower Charlotte is a 29-story, 364 ft (111 m) high-rise building in Charlotte, North Carolina. The tower contains 196 apartment units along with office and retail space. FNB Tower Charlotte is located at 401 South Graham Street.

== History ==
FNB Tower Charlotte was proposed in March 2018 by Dominion Realty Partners as a mixed-use development to be anchored by Pittsburgh-based First National Bank Corporation. Plans for the building included 8 floors of parking space, a ground-floor First National Bank branch, 196 apartment units, and 156,000 square feet of office space. FNB Tower Charlotte broke ground in December 2018, with construction expected to take 24 months. The tower opened in July 2021 and had around 30% of its total office space pre-leased. FNB Tower Charlotte cost $129 million to develop.

== Construction ==
FNB Tower Charlotte was designed by Rule Joy Trammell + Rubio. Batson-Cook Construction served as the main contractor for the project.

== See also ==
- List of tallest buildings in Charlotte
- List of tallest buildings in North Carolina
