= Radius Dilworth =

Apartment development in Charlotte, North Carolina

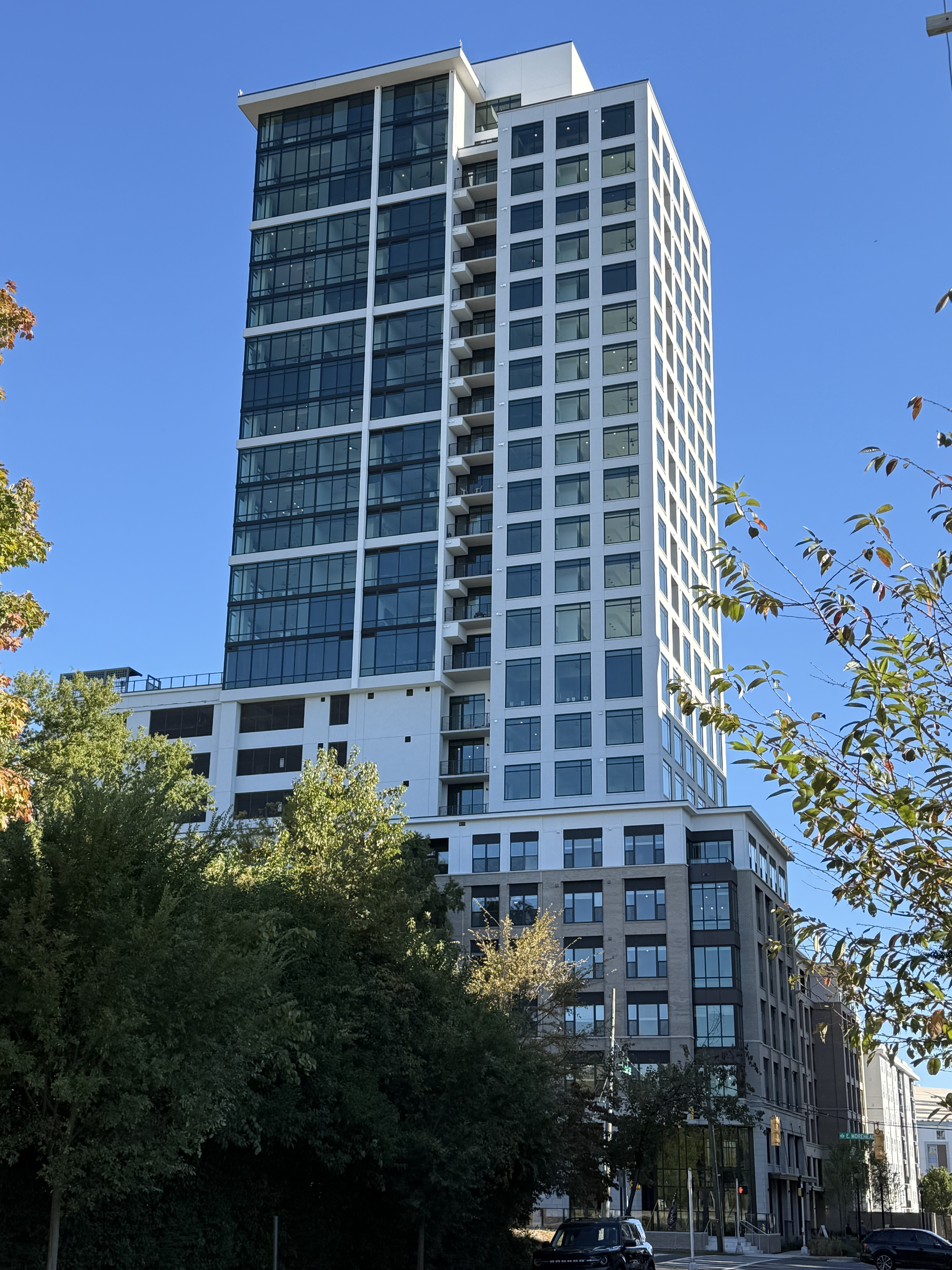
- Overlook Radius Dilworth pictured in October 2025.
- Interactive map of Radius Dilworth
- Location: Dilworth, Charlotte, North Carolina
- Coordinates: 35°13′0″N 80°50′47″W
- Status: Complete
- Groundbreaking: May 2022
- Estimated completion: 2024
- Website: www.radiusdilworth.com

Companies
- Architect: BB+M Architecture
- Developer: Spandrel Development Partners

Technical details
- Cost: $235 million
- Buildings: Overlook, Enclave
- Size: 2.9 acres (1.2 ha)

Radius Dilworth is a two-tower apartment development under construction in the Dilworth neighborhood of Charlotte, North Carolina in the United States.

== History ==
In March 2006 State Street Co announced that 615 East Morehead would be developed into a 34-story luxury condo building. It was reported that it will be a "luxurious residential high-rise". State Street purchased the 1.5 acres (0.61 ha) site in 2002 from the Charlotte Housing Authority for $1.9 million.

The condo project was put on hold due to the recession of the 2000s. The 1.5 acres (0.61 ha) site plus a 1.4 acres (0.57 ha) parking was listed by JLL in August 2019. At that time the asking price was not disclosed. However, according to most recent Mecklenburg land reevaluation the 1.5 acres (0.61 ha) site was valued at $4 million and the 1.4 acres (0.57 ha) site had a value of $3.2 million. In December 2020, Spandrel Development Partners purchased the two parcels totaling 2.8 acre site at 615 E Morehead for $17.8 million.

The site will consist of two towers: an eight-story building of 274 apartment and a 26-story building containing 350 apartments. The two buildings will feature 950,000 square feet (88,000 m^{2}) of space. The buildings will contain studio, one to three-bedroom apartments that range in size from 500 square feet (46 m^{2}) to 1,800 square feet (170 m^{2}). They will have 40,000 square feet (3,700 m^{2}) of amenities which will include a fitness center, pool, and co-working space.

The Overlook building will have 5,000 square feet (460 m^{2}) of ground retail space, enough for at least two retailers. Emanuel Neuman, Spandrel partner said, businesses like coffee shops or restaurants would be a natural fit for the neighborhood. The building will also have a 13-story parking deck with seven stories wrapped around the building. A skybridge will connect the two buildings so that the parking deck is easily accessible from both.

This is Spandrel Development's first project in Charlotte. The company's second project is an apartment development near Camp North End. The developer acquired the 19 acres (7.7 ha) for $4.4 million in September 2022 which is located at 3245 Statesville Ave. It will be a multifamily development composed of 350 apartments Spandrel specifically chose Charlotte because of the city's rapid growth. The Dilworth neighborhood was picked because of its proximity to Uptown, South End, and the light rail. The site is approximately .3 miles away from the Carson Blvd rail light station. Radius Dilworth is a different type of development, most of Dilworth's single-family homes. This development will be one of the first dense housing projects in Dilworth, and the tallest building in the neighborhood. However, there are other nearby developments that are also transforming the neighborhood such as the medical innovation district called The Pearl will be about less than a mile away and the Village on Morehead across Euclid has 200 senior apartments.

== See also ==
- List of tallest buildings in North Carolina / the United States / the world
- List of tallest buildings in Charlotte
