= Regions 615 =

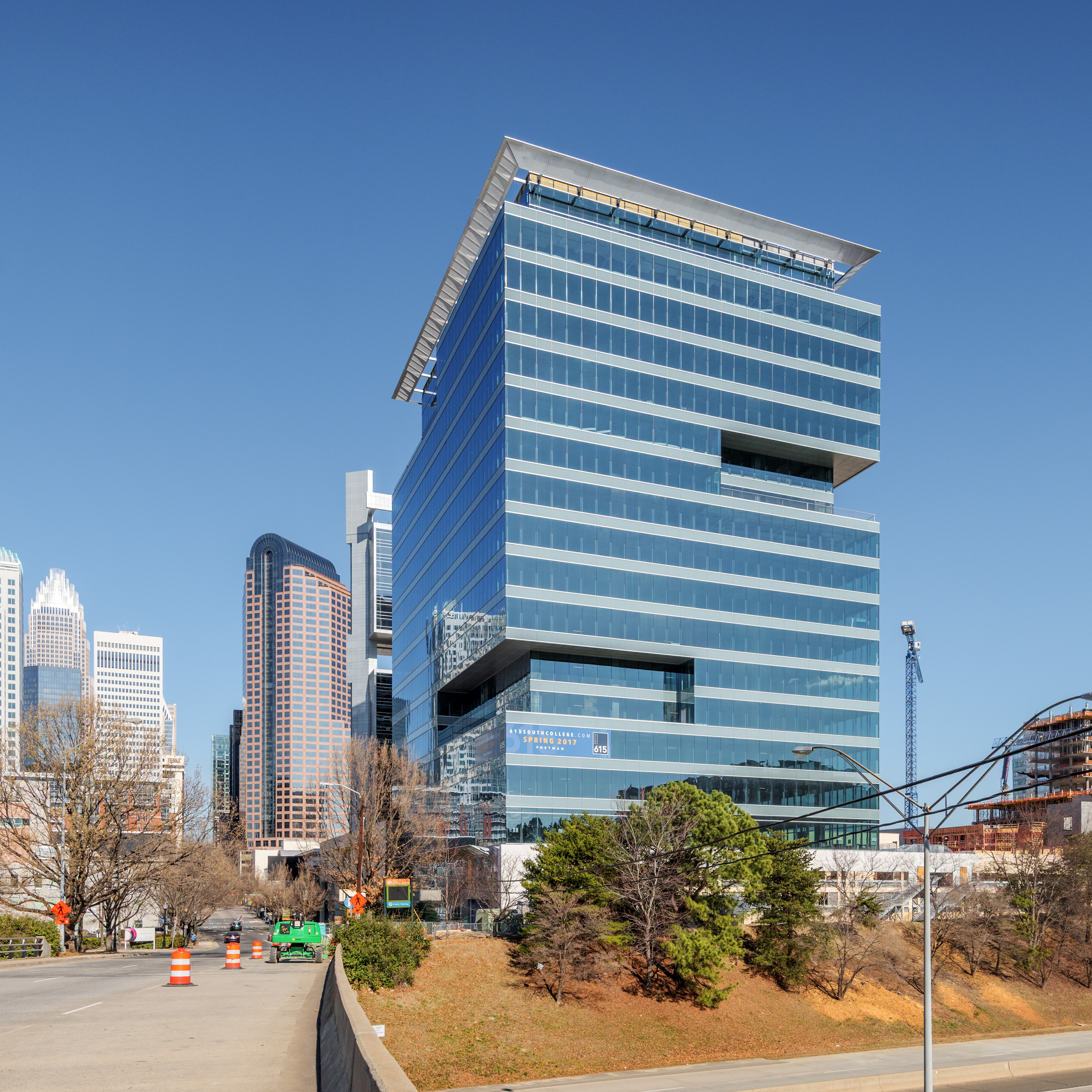

General information
- Status: Completed
- Type: Office building
- Location: 615 South College Street, Charlotte, NC
- Coordinates: 35.221543°N 80.848154°W
- Construction started: August 14, 2015
- Completed: May 17, 2017
- Opened: May 22, 2017
- Cost: $122 million

Height
- Roof: 260 feet (79 m)

Technical details
- Floor count: 16 floors (19 in total with parking lots)
- Floor area: 370,000 sq ft (34,000 m^{2})

Design and construction
- Architect: Portman Architects
- Developer: Portman Holdings
- Structural engineer: Holder Construction LLC.

Other information
- Public transit: Brooklyn Village

Website
- www.regions615.com

Regions 615 is a 19-Story Class-AA Office Building in Uptown Charlotte, North Carolina. It stands at a height of around 260 feet (79 m) with 370,000 square feet (34,000 m^{2}) of floor space.

== History ==
The building was developed by Portman Holdings as the second part of a project that also involved The Westin Charlotte. The building intentionally has a look similar to the Westin. Originally the site was planned to be condos. However, as a result of the Great Recession demand for condos plummeted. When the building broke ground on August 15, 2015, it had no signed tenants. and was opened on May 22, 2017.

In September 2016 Regions Bank announced their lease of 63,806 square feet (5,928 m^{2}) of the building under construction to become the first tenant. The bank occupies two and a half floors. The space holds capital markets division, specialized industries group, real estate banking division, corporate and commercial banking groups, and consumer lending division employees. At the time of the announcement Regions had 200 local employees.

In June 2017 marketing firm Eric Mower + Associates announced it will be leasing 10,175 square feet (945 m^{2}) on the third floor. It moved its 30 local employees from it midtown office later in the summer of 2017.

In February 2017 BDO USA signed on to become the second tenant of the building occupying 24,837 square feet (2,307 m^{2}) on the 12th floor. The company relocated from its Morehead Square office in August 2017.

In March 2017, WeWork signed a lease for the 8th and 9th floors occupying 51,547 square feet (4,789 m^{2}) to open their first North Carolina office in Charlotte. The location opened in the summer of 2017. Adam Wacenske, general manager of the WeWork's southern region, said this about the new location "When we talk about where we want to launch a location, Charlotte makes perfect sense because it’s one of the fastest-growing cities, a ton of people are relocating there and it’s a top place to do business. We want to be where people are living, working and playing."

In September 2017 Charlotte based Direct Digital announced it signed a lease for 17,681 square feet (1,643 m^{2}) in the building. Direct Digital markets supplement and probiotic brands like Instaflex, Nugenix, Lumiday and Peptiva. The company relocated from NASCAR Plaza in January 2018.

In June 2018 the building was sold to CBRE Global Investors for $222 million. At the time the price of $590 per square foot was a record price. The previous record was $309 per square foot set by the 2016 sale of the Carillon Tower for $147 million.

In October 2018 the building was renamed to Regions 615. Part of Regions originally leasing negotiations in 2016 included naming rights to the building in August 2018 the bank exercised those rights.

In June 2019 MUFG Union Bank announced their intent to open a Charlotte office in the building renting WeWork to serve as an U.S. hub. The goal was to eventually have 300 Charlotte employees in operations, technology, and risk management. The bank planned to have all positions filled within a year and a half. As of March 2021 the bank had 400 employees across their 26,710 square feet (2,481 m^{2}) of space in the building. Going forward the bank will utilize a hybrid work model. In September 2021 U.S. Bancorp agreed to buy MUFG Union Bank. However, MUFG stated that Charlotte will continue to be an important hub for operations and technology.

In September 2023 law firm Katten Muchin Rosenman announced it will be moved from 550 South Tryon to the building to occupy 31,386 square feet (2,916 m^{2}) on the 17th floor. This announcement brought the building's occupancy to 99%.

== See also ==
- Uptown Charlotte
- Regions Bank
- List of tallest buildings in Charlotte
- List of tallest buildings in North Carolina
