= Ascent Uptown (Charlotte) =

Details and measurements of the Ascent Uptown retail space and apartment building

Ascent Uptown Charlotte
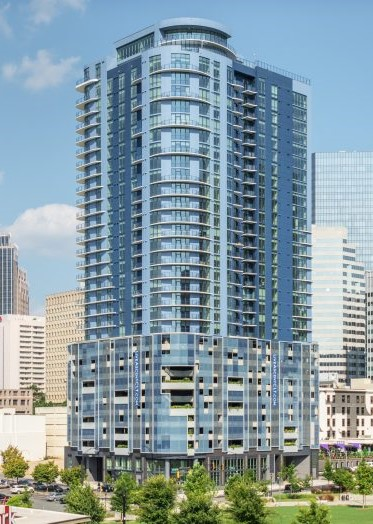
- Ascent Uptown Charlotte, completed 2017

- Location within North Carolina

General information
- Status: Completed
- Type: Residential
- Architectural style: Modernist
- Location: 225 S Poplar St, Charlotte, NC 28202, United States
- Coordinates: 35.2274°N 80.8469°W
- Groundbreaking: February 1, 2015
- Completed: June 16, 2017
- Opened: June 19, 2017
- Cost: $120 million

Height
- Roof: 338 feet (103 m)

Technical details
- Floor count: 33 Floors
- Floor area: 487,000 sq ft (45,200 m^{2})
- Lifts/elevators: 31

Design and construction
- Architects: R2L:Architects, PLLC
- Developer: Greystar Real Estate Partners

Website
- www.liveascentuptown.com

Ascent Uptown is a 33-story apartment building at 225 South Poplar Street in Uptown Charlotte, North Carolina, United States. It was designed by Washington-based R2L Architects and built between 2015 and 2017. The building is 338 feet (103 m) tall and includes 300 units over 487,000 sq ft (45,200 m^{2}) of floor area.

== Architecture ==
The building comprises 300 residential units, including studios, one bedroom and two bedroom apartments, with a starting rent of $1,531, $1,987 and $2,974 respectively. There are also penthouses, the largest unit measuring 1,400 sq ft (130 m^{2}). Each unit has floor to ceiling windows, quartz countertops, custom high-gloss cabinetry, Bosch and GE appliances and Bluetooth entry locks.

20,000 sq ft (1,900 m^{2}) of amenities are spread over two floors, including a three-room fitness center, sky lounge, pool, community kitchen, private workspaces as well as multiple entertainment and lounge spaces. The rooftop will feature a swimming pool and spacious sundeck, cabanas, grilling stations and fire pit. The first floor features a farm-to-table restaurant called Haymaker. The restaurant will provide room service to residents which includes seasonal menus and craft cocktails.

== History ==
Constructed between 2015 and 2017 on a build-to-rent basis, Ascent Uptown was the sixth residential building to be built in Uptown Charlotte since the end of the Great Recession.

In 2023, Northmarq arranged the acquisition of the tower by New York City-based Sterling Equities on behalf of the former owner, Charleston-based Greystar Real Estate Partners, for $138 million.

== See also ==
- List of tallest buildings in North Carolina / the United States / the world
- List of tallest buildings in Charlotte, North Carolina
