= Legacy Union =

Building complex in Charlotte, North Carolina

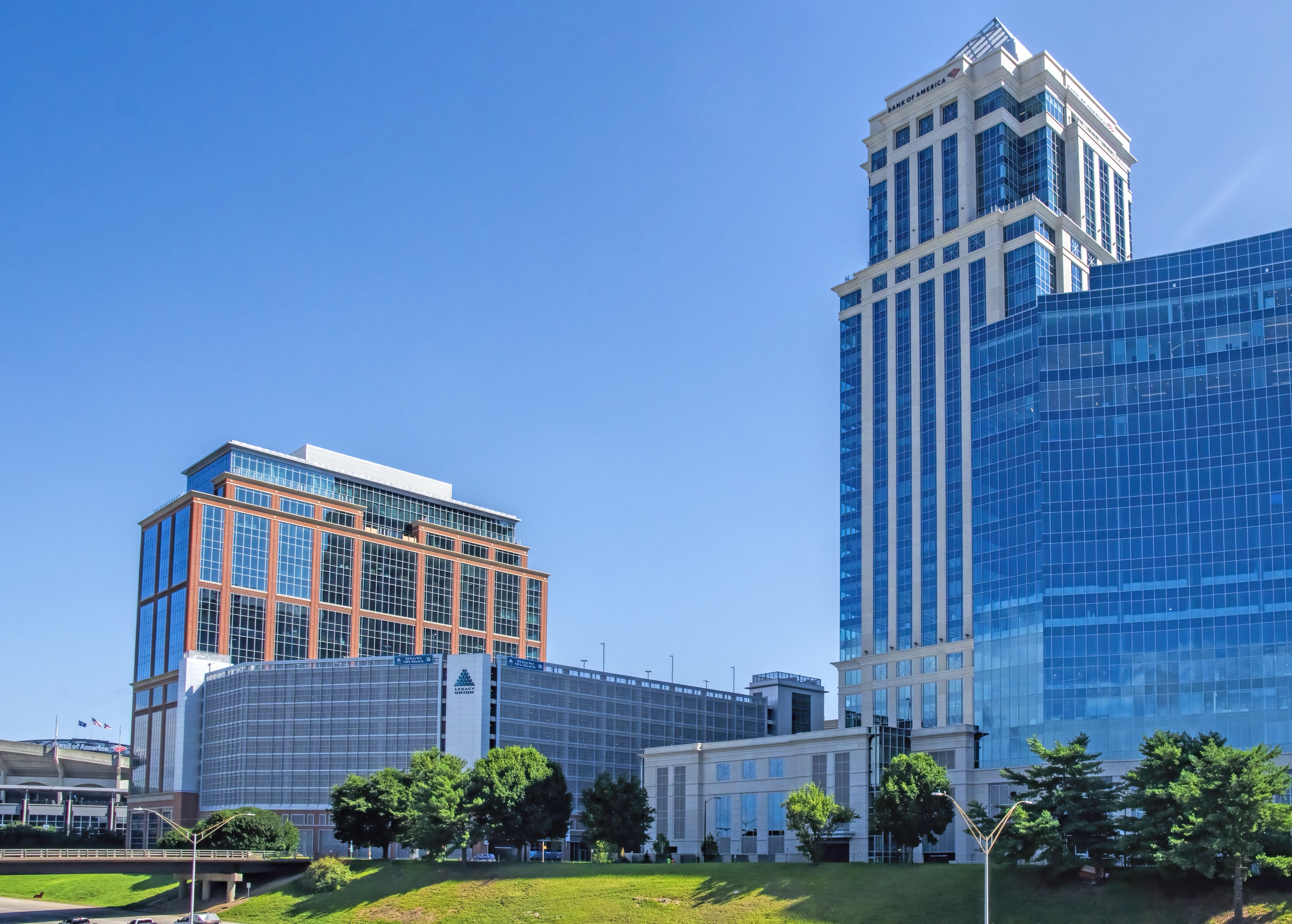
- Legacy Union seen from I-277 in July 2021.
- Interactive map of Legacy Union
- Location: Tryon Street, Charlotte, NC
- Status: Completed
- Groundbreaking: August 4, 2017
- Estimated completion: 2021
- Website: legacyunioncharlotte.com

Companies
- Developer: Lincoln Harris

Technical details
- Buildings: Bank of America Tower, 650 South Tryon, Honeywell Tower, 600 South Tryon, and possible hotel
- Size: 10.2 acres (4.1 ha)

Legacy Union, formerly known as 620 South Tryon, is a multi-building development in Uptown Charlotte, North Carolina. It broke ground on August 4, 2017, and finished in 2021. The development includes the world headquarters of Honeywell and major corporate offices for Deloitte, JLL, Bank of America, and Robinson Bradshaw.

== History ==
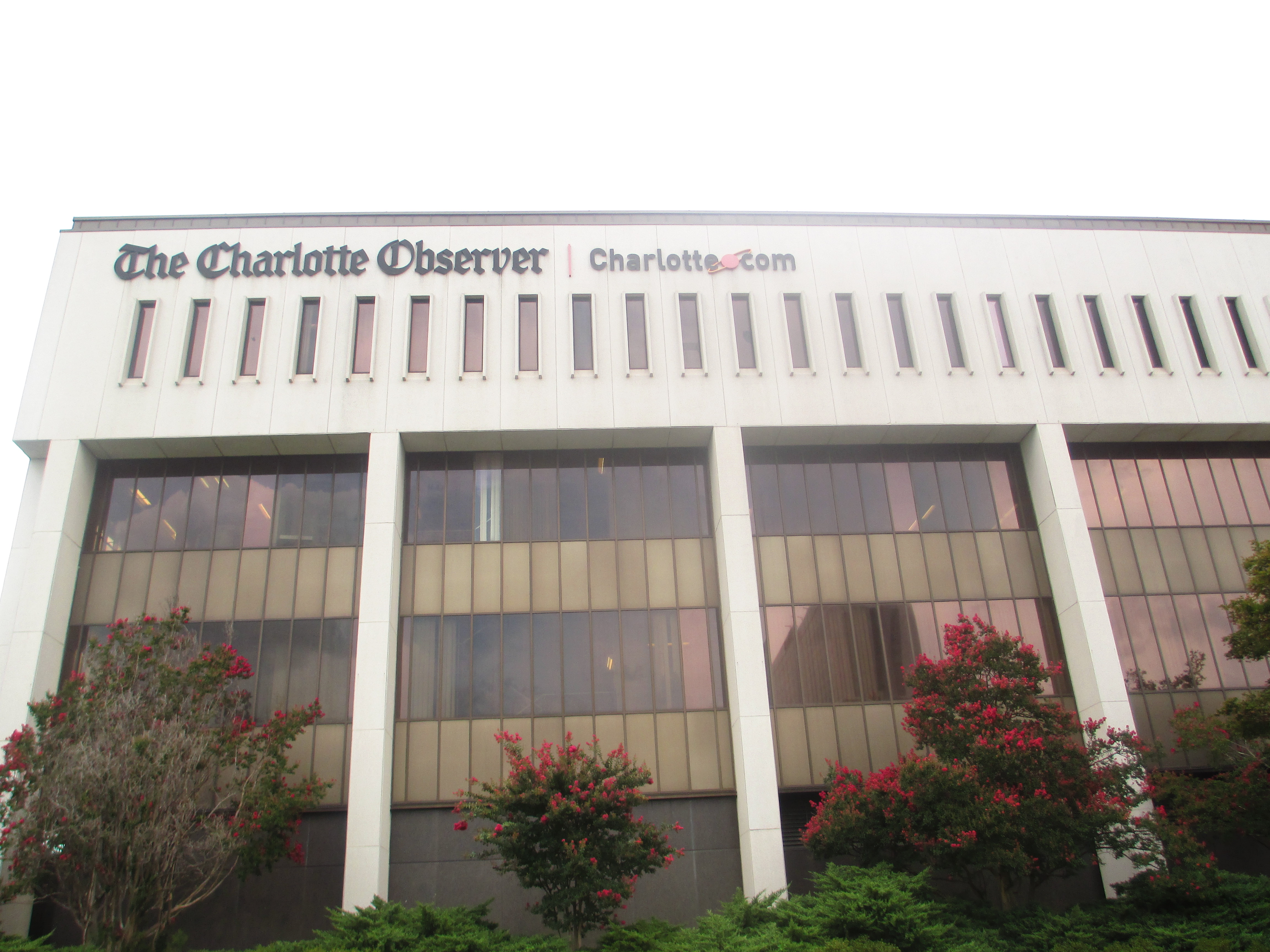
The Charlotte Observer headquarters (former)

The site of the development is located on the former site of the Charlotte Observer. It is a mixed use development that spans two city blocks and is bordered by Tryon St, Stonewall St, Mint St, and Interstate 277. Lincoln Harris and Goldman Sachs purchased the 10-acre property in 2016 for a price of $37.5 million. The land was purchased in 3 transactions. The first transaction was 5 acres for $11 million which closed in April 2016. The second transaction was the site of the Charlotte Observer building which was 4.1 acres for $23.1 million, the sale closed in May 2016. The final transaction was for a .7-acre site that closed in September 2016. In 2017 when the development was originally being discussed only the first building, the Bank of America Tower, was being discussed. Demolition of the Charlotte Observer building began on August 1, 2016.

The name was chosen to honor the past and celebrate Charlotte's future. The way developer Lincoln Harris intents to celebrate Charlotte future is by making the site a destination for people to gather. A pedestrian plaza connecting Tryon Street and Bank of America Stadium patterned after plazas in London, Paris, and Rome will accomplish this. Also, the developer will be including retail space and possibly a convention center hotel containing more than 1,000 rooms.

== Buildings ==
=== Bank of America Tower ===
Bank of America signed on as the anchor tenant in August 2017, agreeing to occupy 550,000 square feet (51,000 m^{2}) of the 841,000-square-foot (78,100 m^{2}) building. The building topped out in September 2018 and delivered in August 2019. Other tenants of the building include law firm Parker Poe leasing 86,000 square feet (8,000 m^{2}) across three floors, and KPMG leasing 46,000 square feet (4,300 m^{2}) across two floors. The Bank also has a retail branch accessible through the lobby of the building. They began moving their employees in during August 2019 initially only into floors 14 and 15. At that time the tower was 90% leased. The bank employees that will occupy the building are coming from Bank of America Corporate Center and 1 Bank of America Center. Bank of America stated they plan to use some of the floors as collaborative work space without assigned seating. They have consolidated 2,000 employees from all over the city across 22 floors of the building. This has allowed them to reduce its Charlotte real estate footprint by 100,000 square feet (9,300 m^{2}).

In August 2019, Raleigh-based Highwoods Properties agreed to purchase the tower for $436 million. The deal closed in November 2019, the price slightly increased to $441 million and it was a record setting sale price for the state of North Carolina until Truist Financial agreed to purchase the former Hearst Tower now Truist Center for $455 million. The purchase gave Highwoods Properties their first property in the Charlotte market. The property was marketed by multiple Cushman & Wakefield groups to about 50 to 75 investors worldwide that normally did not have Charlotte on their radar. Selling the property was not a problem since at the time Charlotte had a growing and diverse economy.

In February 2021, Highwoods Properties began to consider expanding the building by 30,000 square feet (2,800 m^{2}) to 50,000 square feet (4,600 m^{2}). The expansion would be in the building's podium and would be used for a speculative office development. Also rooftop amenities were being considered. The goal would be to provide a variety of space usage options to meet customer demands.

On June 17, 2022, architecture firm Gresham Smith announced it had signed a 10-year lease for 15,000 square feet (1,400 m^{2}) to 17,000 square feet (1,600 m^{2}) of space. Its 50 local employees moved from their former 8,000 square feet (740 m^{2}) at Charlotte Plaza and 201 S. College St. The company began occupying the space in the spring of 2023.

UNC Chapel Hill's Kenan-Flager Business School announced on July 27, 2022 it would open a Charlotte campus in the building with classes to begin in the fall semester. The school occupied temporary space on the third floor until its permanent home on the fourth floor composed of 160,000 square feet (15,000 m^{2}) was completed. Placement on the fourth floor gave the school easy access to parking and outdoor space that will be used for functions.

On September 20, 2022, the Atlantic Coast Conference announced it will be moving its headquarters from Greensboro to Charlotte. The conference currently occupies a 18,500 square foot building that it owns in Greensboro. They will move into a similar amount of space in the Bank of America Tower. The conference has stated that during the current academic year they will be occupying the space and all 50 employees will be relocating to Charlotte. In August 2023 the Atlantic Coast Conference held a grand opening ceremony for its new location in the building. The ceremony was attended by the ACC Commissioner, mascots from its 15 schools, Charlotte mayor Vi Lyles, local sports and business executives, and Lincoln Harris CEO Johnny Harris.

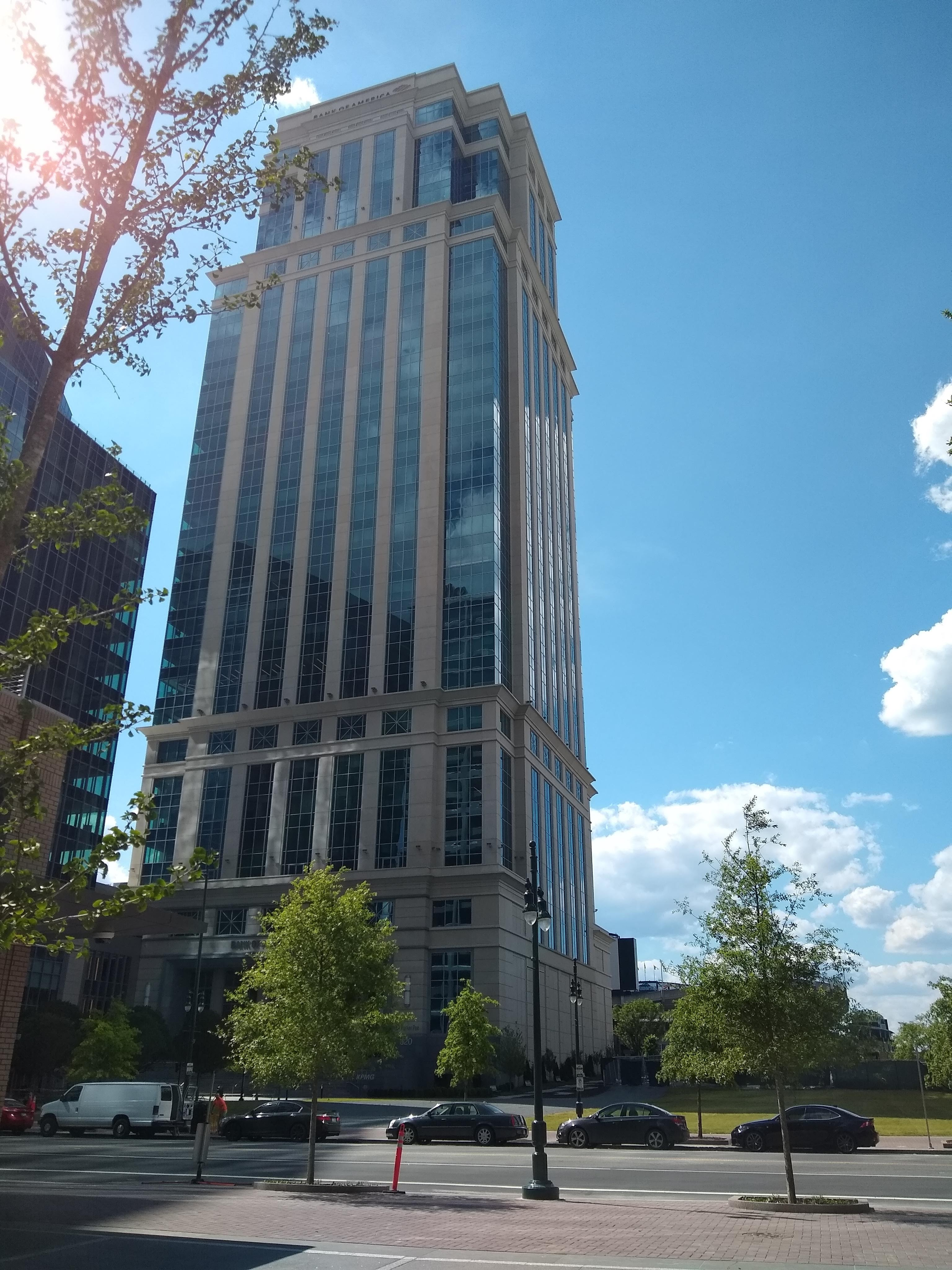
The completed building in May 2021.

=== 650 South Tryon ===
The second phase of the Legacy Union development includes the 18-story, 290-ft-tall 650 South Tryon building, which includes 362,000 square feet (33,600 m^{2}) of office space. It sits on 2.2 acres of the 10-acre development and is located at the corner of Hill and South Tryon. Deloitte is the anchor tenant, leasing 90,000 square feet (8,400 m^{2}). Construction of the building began in December 2018 The building has 10,000 square feet (930 m^{2}) to 12,000 square feet (1,100 m^{2}) of ground floor retail.

Deloitte was previously leasing 70,000 square feet (6,500 m^{2}) at the Duke Energy Center. In the Charlotte region, the company has 1,300 employees and is one of the Charlotte area's leading accounting firms. Other tenants include property management company JLL leasing 41,000 square feet (3,800 m^{2}), New York law firm Cadwalader Wickersham & Taft leasing 72,000 square feet (6,700 m^{2}) which will hold their 89 Charlotte based attorneys, and Robinhood announced they will open a local office in the building to house the 289 employees they will be hiring in Charlotte by 2025.

In May 2022, Highwoods Properties Inc. disclosed its purchase of the building for $203 million. At the time of the deal the building was 78% occupied. The deal is expected to close in the third quarter of 2022.

In August 2022 Robinhood announced it will be closing its Charlotte office and laying off all 82 local employees. This was part of a 23% company wide reduction of workers. However, later in August, San Francisco based Figure Technology announced that they will be subleasing 24,000 square feet, half of Robinhood's space. 90 employees will be moving into the space once Robinhood vacates it.

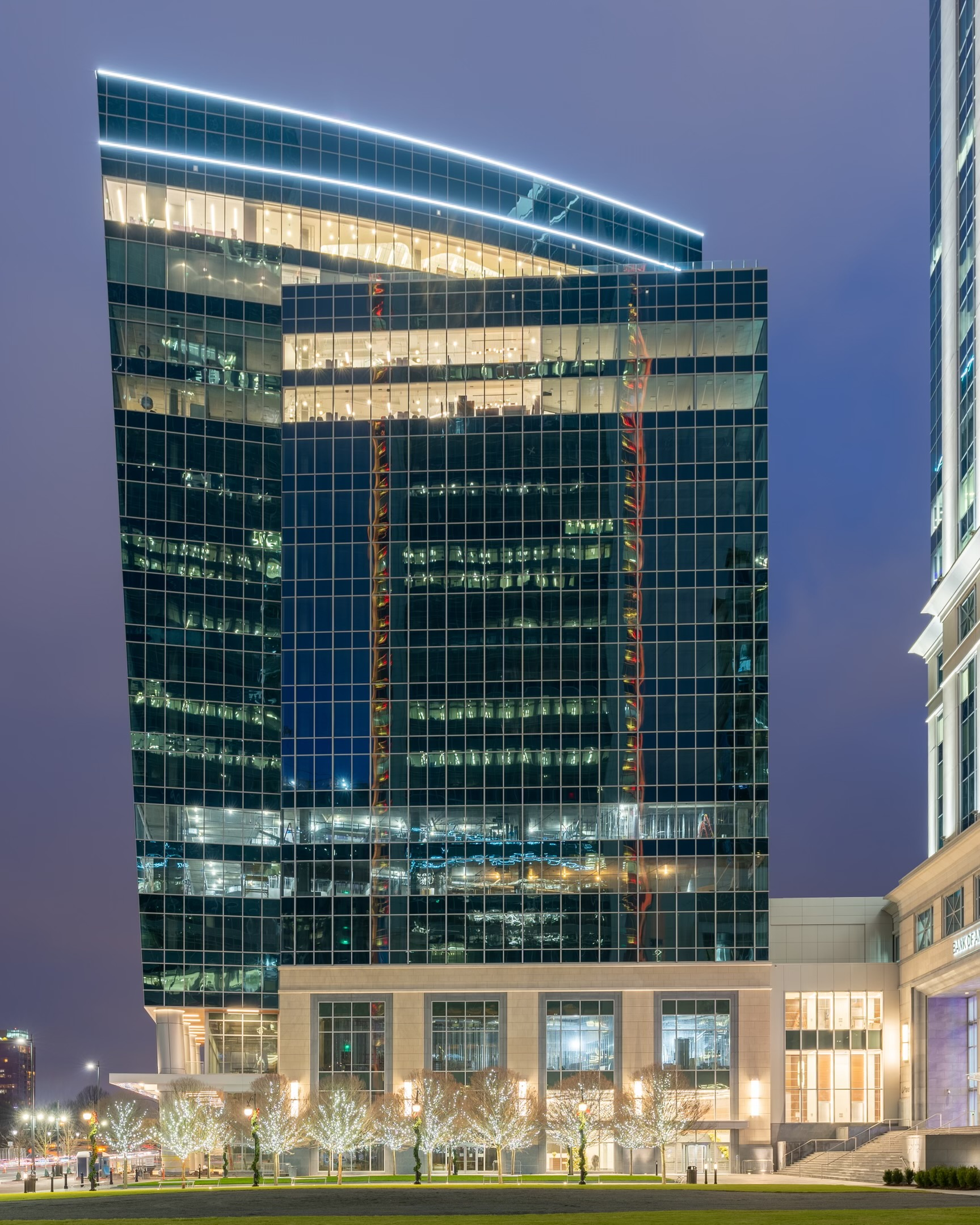
The completed building at night

=== Honeywell Tower ===
In late 2018, Honeywell announced it would relocate its corporate headquarters from New Jersey to Charlotte, beginning in 2019 after the company accepted $90 million of state and local incentives. The company began relocating positions in July 2019. They also looked at the neighborhoods of South End and Ballantyne in Charlotte before deciding on Uptown. In June 2019, Lincoln Harris announced Honeywell will occupy 280,000 square feet (26,000 m^{2}) in the 23-story building in the 330,000-square-foot (31,000 m^{2}) building, housing 750 employees. Honeywell will be leasing 10 floors, which is the majority of the leasable floors. The remaining floors will include ground floor retail, parking, and the lobby. Construction began in October 2019 with completion in 2021. In October 2020 Honeywell filed a rezoning petition to put four signs on the building. In August 2021 Honeywell began to occupy the building by inviting employees back to work after a long period of remote only work due to the COVID-19 pandemic. As of November 2021, 800 employees now occupy the building. In September 2022 the building achieved LEED Gold certification.

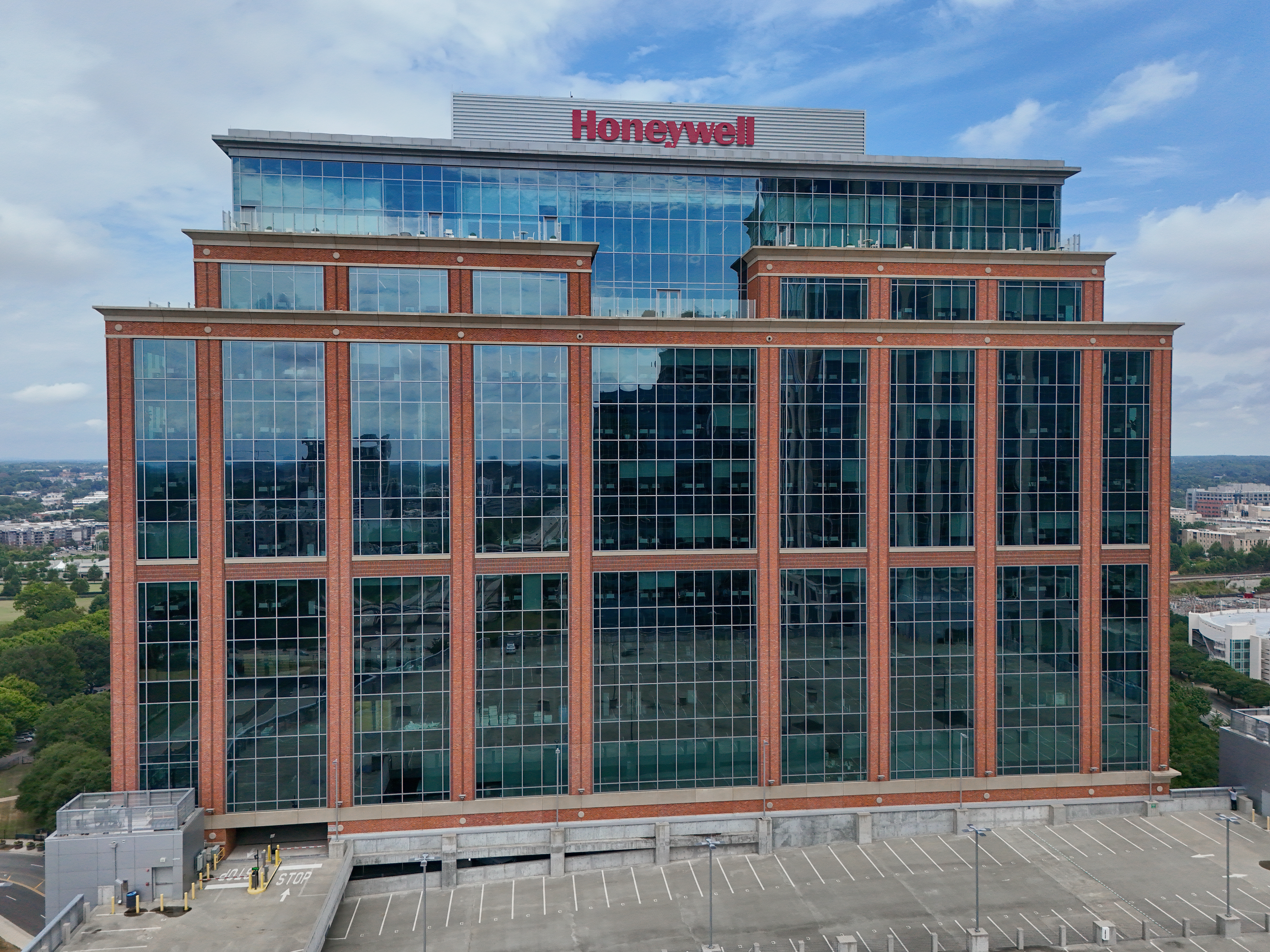
The building in July 2025

=== 600 S Tryon ===
The tower will be anchored by Robinson Bradshaw, who signed a 15-year lease. The firm is one of Charlotte's largest law firms. At the time of signing the lease the firm was leasing space in One Independence Center. They will occupy 102,000 square feet (9,476 m^{2}) of space over the top four floors. Construction started in April 2022. It will be a 24-story tower with 415,000 square feet (38,555 m^{2}) total space, including 20,000 square feet (1,858 m^{2}) of ground floor retail. In January 2025 several new leases were announced. Architecture firm LS3P Associates will occupy 26,000 square feet (2,415 m^{2}) on the 20th floor, starting in the fall of 2025. National coworking brand Industrious will lease 26,000 square feet (2,415 m^{2}) on the 18th floor starting at the end of 2025. Accounting firm CohnReznick will occupy 12,500 square feet (1,161 m^{2}) on the 19th floor, starting in the summer of 2025. The new deals bring the building to 50% leased. In August 2025 Pike Corp. announced they will move their headquarters from 615 S. College St. to the building to occupy 50,000 square feet (4,645 m^{2}) across two floors. This space will accommodate 200 workers and they will be moving into it in early 2026.

The location of the building is the exact site of the former Charlotte Observer building. The former building was 361,000 square feet (33,538 m^{2}) and it was at the corner of Stonewall St (now Brooklyn Village) and South Tryon St. The Charlotte Observer was housed there for nearly 50 years.

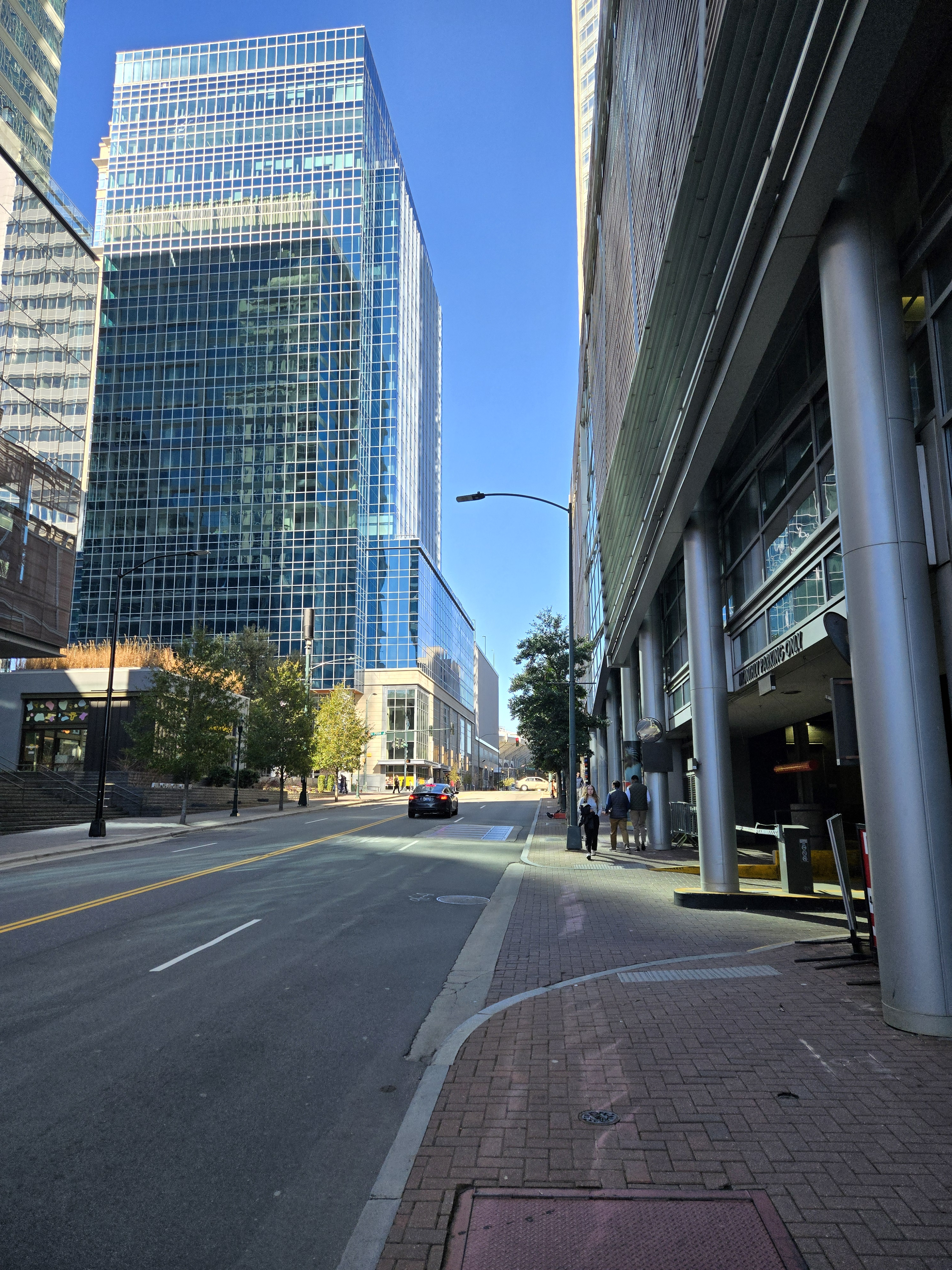
The completed building in January 2025.

== Parking ==
A common parking deck providing 3,104 parking spaces with four levels of executive parking is located at 720 South Church Street.

== See also ==
- List of tallest buildings in North Carolina / the United States / the world
- List of tallest buildings in Charlotte
