= One Independence Center =

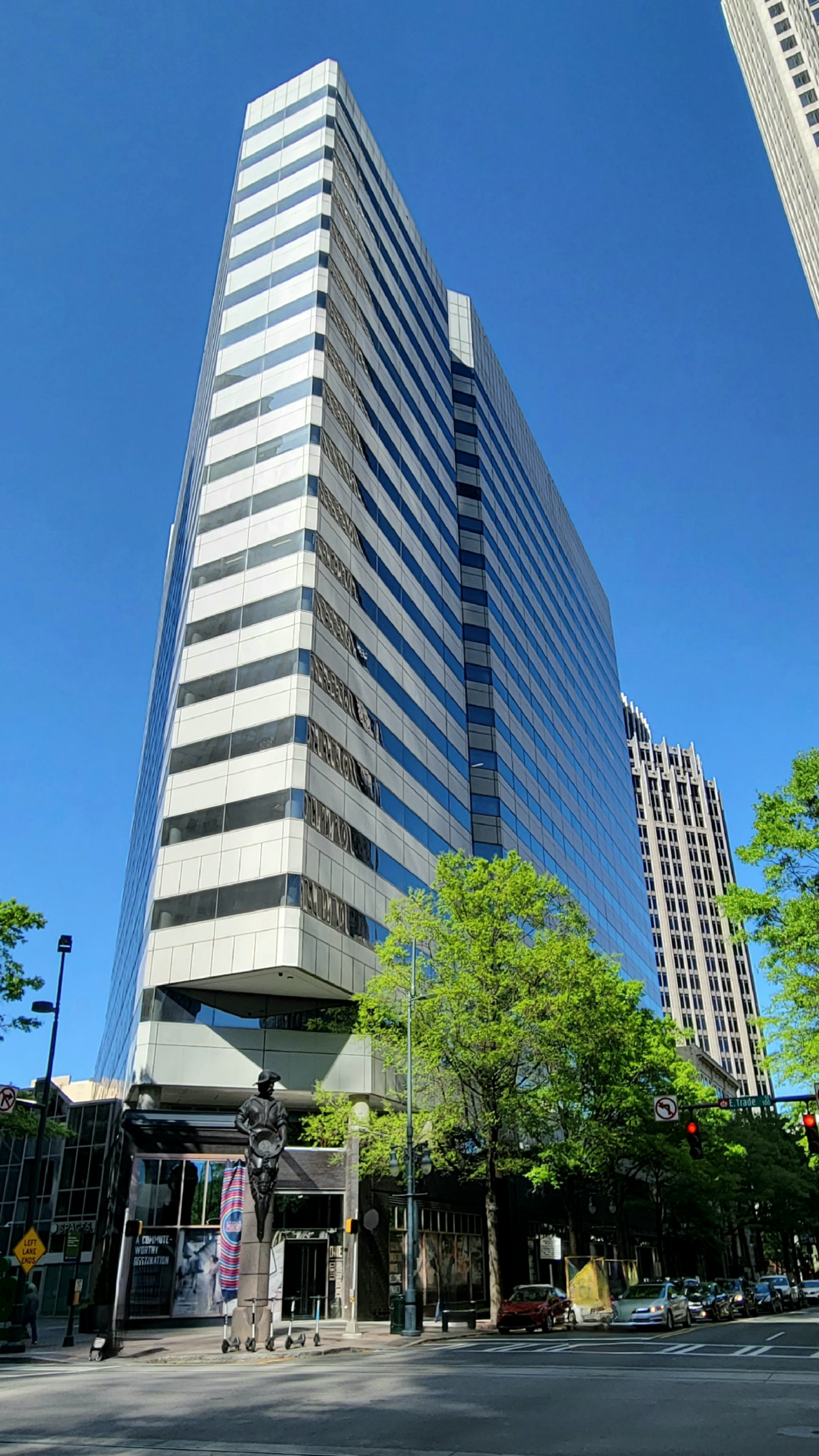
- Interactive map of the One Independence Center area

General information
- Status: Completed
- Type: Office
- Coordinates: 35.226529°N 80.843684°W
- Completed: 1983
- Opening: 1983

Height
- Antenna spire: 301 feet (92 m)

Technical details
- Floor count: 20
- Floor area: 565,694 square feet (52,554.7 m^{2})
- Lifts/elevators: 11

Other information
- Parking: 330 spaces
- Public transit: Tryon Street

One Independence Center is a high-rise office building located in Uptown Charlotte, North Carolina. It was completed in 1983 and stands at a height of 301 ft (92 m) with 20 floors. It is the seventh largest building in Charlotte by leasable square feet with 565,694 square feet. It sits on the former site of the Independence Building at Charlotte's Independence Square.

== History ==
The building was finished in 1983. It is the site of the former Independence Building which was constructed in 1909, it was demolished in September 1981. At its opening The Independence Building with 12 floors was the tallest building in North Carolina.

The developers Faison firm and Williams Realty of Tulsa, Oklahoma announced in October 1981 the specifics of the building. It was planned to contain 583,000 square feet (54,162 m^{2}) with 28,000 square feet (2,601 m^{2}) of retail space. NCNB, now Bank of America, planned to lease 260,000 square feet (24,155 m^{2}) on floors 2 - 10. The building was built diagonal from NCNB Plaza, the bank headquarters in 1981. Therefore, the building was planned to be an extension of the bank's headquarters. The building was forecasted to cost $48 million.

NCNB planned to consolidate its corporate services from a 100,000 square feet (9,290 m^{2}) building it purchased in 1970 and the 60,000 square feet (5,574 m^{2}) of additional leased space into the building. The bank moved 700 employees into the building in August 1983. At the time this accounted for about a third of the bank's 2,300 local employees. Other tenants began to occupy floors 10 - 20 in September 198.

In October 1983 Smith Barney Harris Upham & Co. Inc., a stock brokerage, left NCNB Plaza. Insurance broker Alexander and Alexander moved from Wachovia Center. Later in the month Brooks Fashion opened a 2,900 square feet (269 m^{2}) store in the building. Wheat, First Securities Inc., a stock brokerage moved from a 5,000 square feet (465 m^{2}) space at Northwestern building. Fashion store The Limited opened a 3,000 square feet (279 m^{2}) store.

In November 1983 law firm Fleming, Robinson, Bradshaw & Hinson signed a lease for 20,000 square feet (1,858 m^{2}) on the top two floors. Previously the firm had leased 16,000 square feet (1,486 m^{2}) on two floors at First Union Plaza. At that time the building was 70% leased. Then later in the same month 3 new tenants signed leases to bring the building to 75% leased. The companies include Chubb & Sons, an insurance underwriting firm, leasing 9,000 square feet on the 17th floor; Sterling Capital Management Co, an investment counseling firm, leasing 5,400 on the 17th floor; and Grier and Grier, a law firm, leased 2,200 square feet on the 2nd floor.

In August 1996 Cousins Properties announced it had reached an agreement to purchase the building for $69.3 million. The sale was finalized in December. Part of the announcement was possibility of also creating a $300 million uptown basketball and entertainment complex composed of four blocks of Uptown. Cousins announced in December 1997 that it would remodel the 9,000 square feet (836 m^{2}) building lobby

In March 1998 building tenant Robinson, Bradshaw & Hinson announced a $1 million makeover of their current 65,000 square feet (6,039 m^{2}) of space and the addition of 17,000 square feet (1,579 m^{2}) of space. At the time of the announcement the company had 225 employees occupying the space. American Financial Realty Trust purchased the building in September 2004 for $100 million from Cousins Properties Inc. Local property management company Colliers Pinkard was hired to handle leasing. The building was 92% occupied at the time of the sale with Bank of America Corp. and the Robinson, Bradshaw & Hinson law firm as the anchor tenants.

In June 2011 law firm Robinson Bradshaw & Hinson signed a 10-year renewal for 108,155 square feet (10,048 m^{2}). They firm occupied the top 5 floors. At the time of signing the renewal they had 125 local employees and were the second largest law firm in Charlotte after Moore & Van Allen.

In October 2011 Northeastern University opened its Charlotte with 14,000 square feet (1,301 m^{2}) in the building for offices and classrooms. The school's goal was to eventually have 2,000 enrolled in the Charlotte campus. Classes began in January 2012.

LRC Properties and Cornerstone Real Estate Advisors purchased 101 Independence Center from previous owner KBS Capital Advisors and Gramercy Property Trust in 2015 for $108 million. At the time it was 84% occupied with Bank of America as the largest occupant with 261,000 square feet (24,248 m^{2}). In August 2015 Bank of America vacated 95,000 square feet (8,826 m^{2}) across four floors. Accounting firm CliftonLarsonAllen vacated the tenth floor earlier in 2015 which left 119,296 square feet (11,083 m^{2}) of continuous space available. Few buildings in Uptown Charlotte at that time had that amount of continuous space available.

In September 2015 Stewart Engineering signed a lease for 16,000 square feet (1,486 m^{2}) on the 14th floor. The company relocated their employees from BB&T Center to the space in early 2015.

In August 2017, an $8 million building renovation began. The renovations included adding a collobration area to the atrium, new art work in the lobby, and updated hallways and restrooms. Also in 2017 New York-based Sunlight Financial signed a lease for 13,500 square feet (1,254 m^{2}) in the building in November. The company issues loans for residential solar projects. Their 20 local employees moved from Packard Place in the first quarter of 2018.

Crescent Communities and Nuveen purchased the building in 2019 from LRC Properties for $132.3 million. Currently Crescent is spending $25 million to renovate the building. The renovation will mostly affect the ground floor with the overhaul of the lobby, adding additional outdoor seating, and renovation of future ground floor retail space. The goal is to make retail more accessible from the street. Previously most retail was accessible from the interior.

The building was 80% leased as of August 2020, its tenants included Bank of America, Robinson Bradshaw, Levvel, Northeastern University, and Sunlight Financial and Spaces. Levvel's occupancy is part of a doubling of Charlotte office square footage from 12,000 square feet (1,115 m^{2}) in NASCAR Plaza to 24,000 square feet (2,230 m^{2}). The company chose the building due to its close proximity to parking and the light rail. It currently has 90 employees in Charlotte.

In May 2022 Robinson Bradshaw announced they will vacate their space in the building in 2024 when 600 South Tryon is complete to become the anchor tenant occupying 102,000 square feet (9,476 m^{2}). The firm will occupy the top 4 floors of the 24 story building that has 415,000 square feet (38,555 m^{2}). This will be the fourth building in Legacy Union.

In July 2022 Stays by Walker, a short term rental agency, announced they will be leasing 3,000 square feet (279 m^{2}) in the building. The company relocated from Prosperity Place in University Area. Kay Walker, CEO of Stays Walker, stated this about the space “The proximity to so many of Charlotte's major corporate players will be a huge asset to our company, and our team members will enjoy the property's newly renovated common spaces and top-of-the-line amenities. The quality of the improvements of the office space was very high-end and consistent with the high-quality offerings we make to our clients.”

In August 2022 UK based The Bank of London announced it will be leasing 40,000 square feet (3,716 m^{2}) in the building to house the 350 jobs they're creating in Charlotte. The bank currently has offices in New York and Belfast. Positions will include software development, compliance and risk, technology operations, infrastructure engineering and business operations. All jobs are planned to be created by 2026.

In October 2022 building permits revealed that a 17,290 square feet (1,606 m^{2}) food hall will be built on the first floor of the building called Monarch Food Hall. The food hall management company is Hospitality HQ. The project is described on the Hospitality HQ website as having 3 bars and artisan food concepts from around the world. This project is part of Crescent Communities, the building owner's, $25 million renovation of the building. Construction started in February 2023. The food hall will include 12 stalls, a full service restaurant occupying 4,300 square feet (399 m^{2}), three bars including one that will be outside along North Tryon, and private event space. It will deliver in late 2023. In August 2023 it was announced that a few dining options have signed on for the food hall. These include Barley and Burger, serving gourmet burgers; Curry Junction, a concept by the owners of Curry Gate, an Indian and Nepalese restaurant; Rolled AF, is a Mexican restaurant that is a joint operation by the owners of Nacho Average Truck and 22 Street Kitchen. The market will include a total of 12 stalls. The planned opening date is fall 2023. In December 2023 additional food stalls were announced. Brooklyn Dumpling Shop, a sweet and savory dumpling shop; also Dock Local, a shop featuring seafood rolls, sandwiches, and tacos will be available in December 2023. Chicago-based FARE, serving grain and vegetable rolls, will be available in spring 2024.

The recently completed $25 million renovation which included Monarch Market are contributing to an increase in occupancy. In February 2024 Crescent Communities announced it had signed six leases amounting to 68,600 square feet (6,373 m^{2}) space. Two of the companies include Genesis10, moving from the Johnston Building and Bloomreach moving from 1920 Abbott St. in South End. The building is now 70% leased.

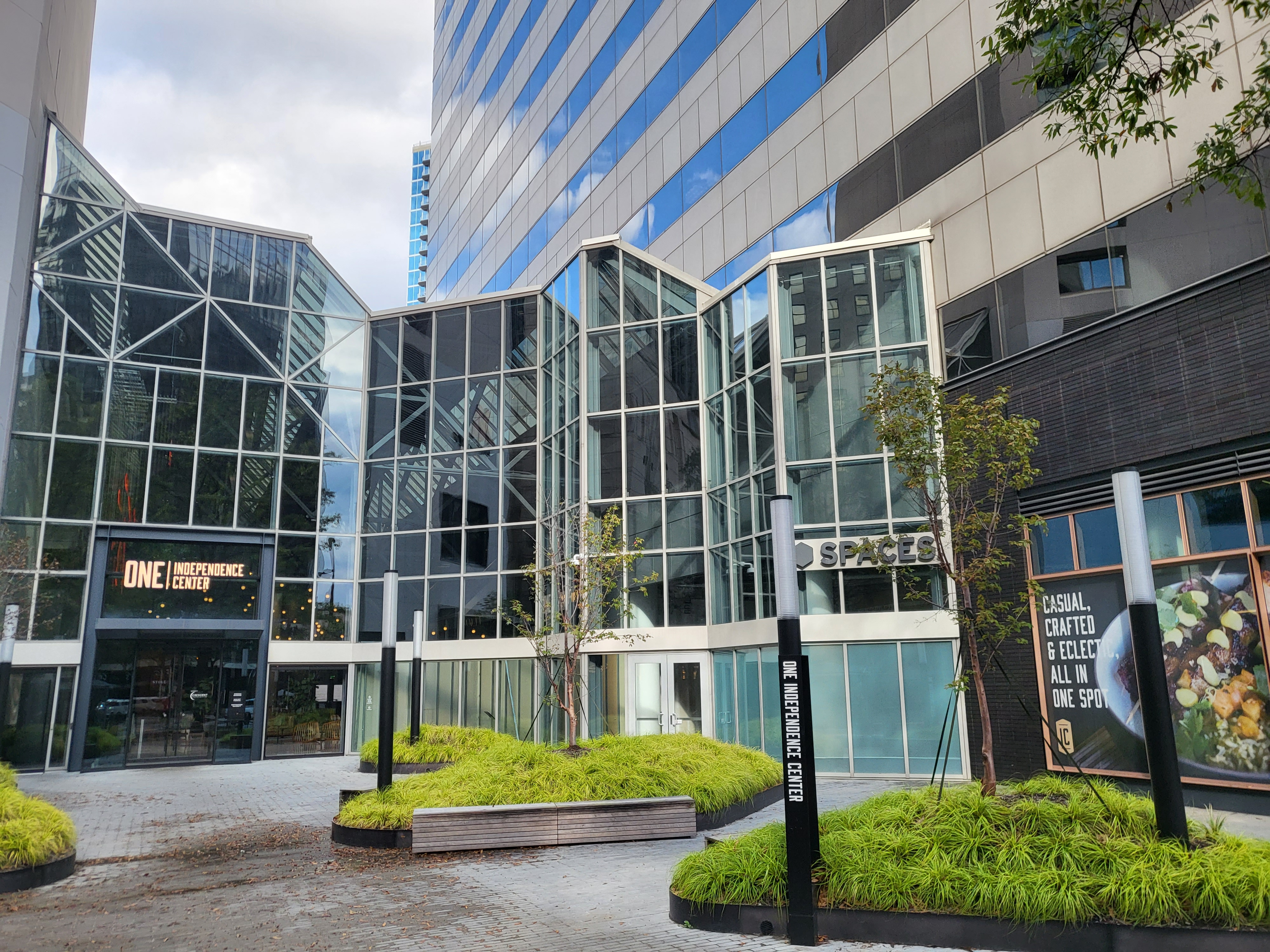
The renovated entrance to the building in November 2022

== See also ==
- List of tallest buildings in Charlotte
- Uptown Charlotte
