= Durham Centre (Durham, North Carolina) =

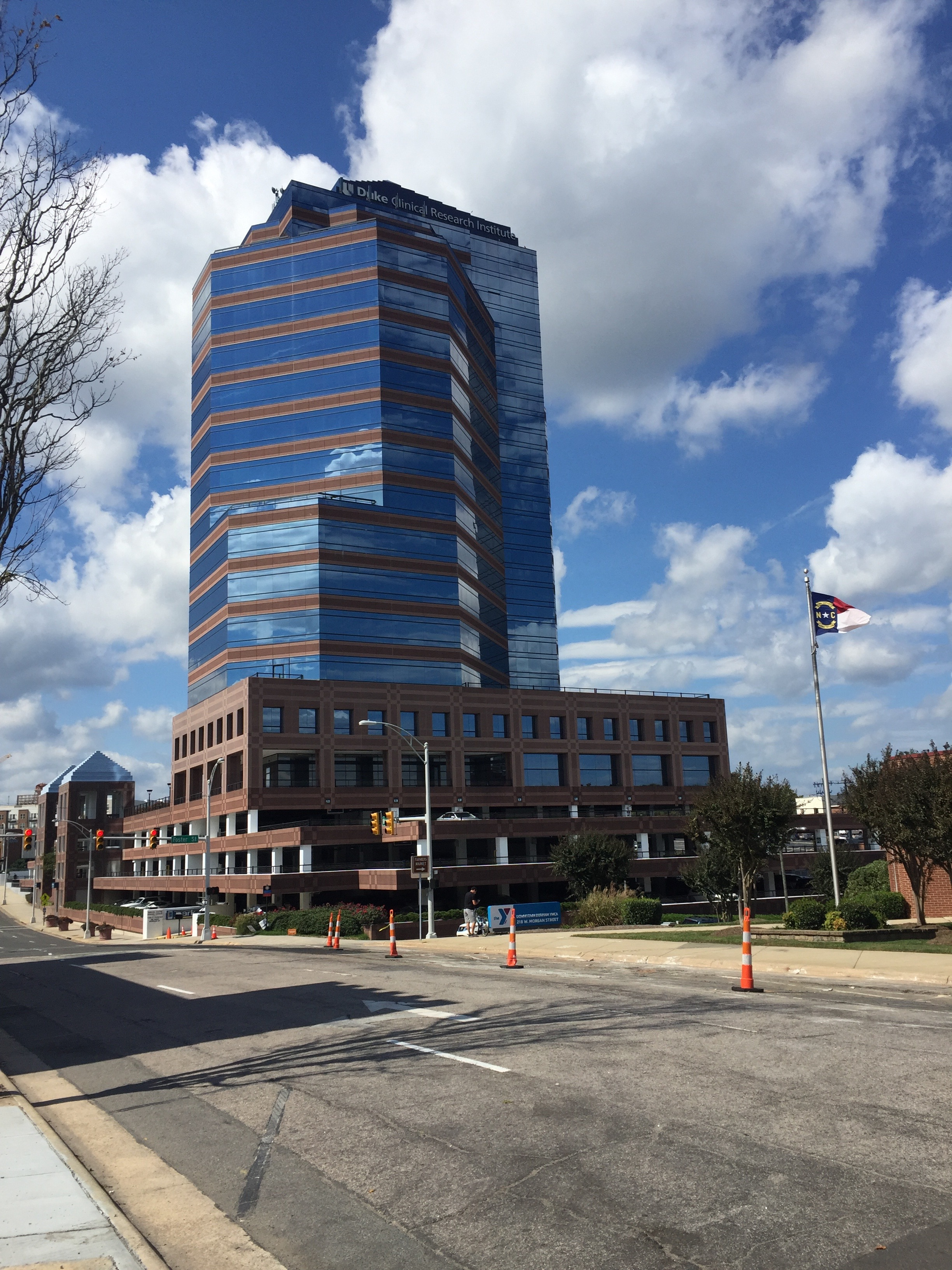
- Durham Centre in 2015
- Interactive map of the Durham Centre area
- Former names: People's Security Tower

General information
- Status: Completed
- Type: Office
- Location: 300 West Morgan Street; Durham, North Carolina, USA
- Coordinates: 35.9983°N 78.9021°W
- Construction started: 1986
- Completed: 1988
- Owner: Craig Davis Properties

Height
- Height: 223 feet (68 m)

Technical details
- Floor count: 15
- Floor area: 195,911
- Lifts/elevators: 6

The Durham Centre is a 15-story office skyscraper located at 300 West Morgan Street in Downtown Durham, North Carolina.

Durham Centre is the second tallest building in downtown Durham, after the One City Center, and the third tallest in Durham behind University Tower (standing at 350 feet 4 miles southwest of downtown).

Completed in 1988, it was originally named People's Security Tower after its original primary tenant, People's Security Insurance. It has three stories of garage parking,

The original plan called for a "twin tower" adjacent to Durham Centre that would be called "Renaissance at Durham Centre" and would comprise mainly of condominiums and apartments with retail on the lower levels. This project was cancelled and the plot where the building would have been has been turned into a small greenspace adjacent to Durham Centre on top of the parking garage.
