= One City Center (Durham) =

Skyscraper in Durham, North Carolina

Coordinates: 35°59′45″N 78°54′5″W

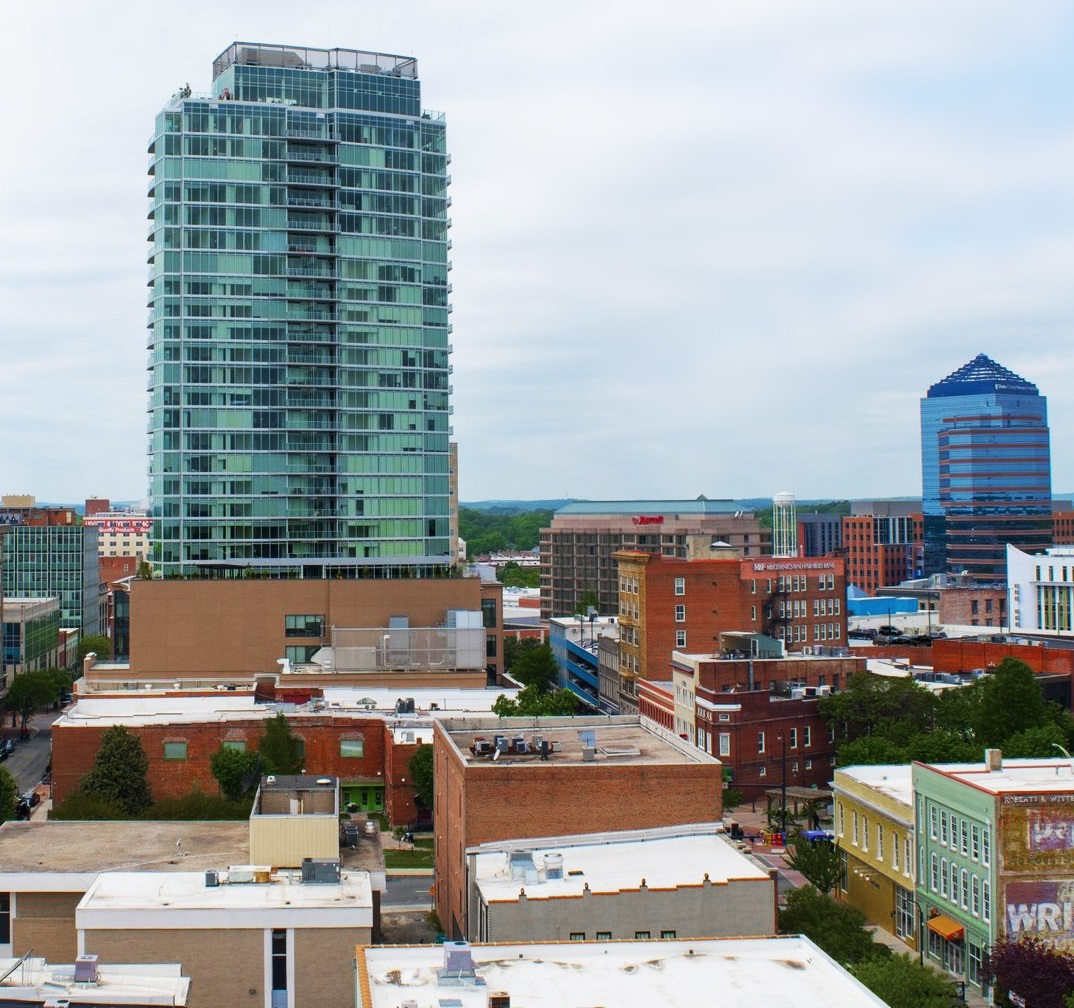

General information
- Status: Completed
- Type: Multiuse
- Location: 110 Corcoran Street; Durham, North Carolina, USA
- Completed: 2018

Height
- Height: 300 feet (91 m)

Technical details
- Floor count: 27

Design and construction
- Developer: Austin Lawrence Partners

Website
- apartmentsatonecitycenter.com

One City Center is a 27-story mixed-use tower located at 110 Corcoran Street in Downtown Durham, North Carolina, in the United States. One City Center is the tallest building in downtown Durham, and the second tallest in Durham behind University Tower. Completed in 2018, One City Center is partially leased to Duke University and WeWork.
