= The Westin Charlotte =

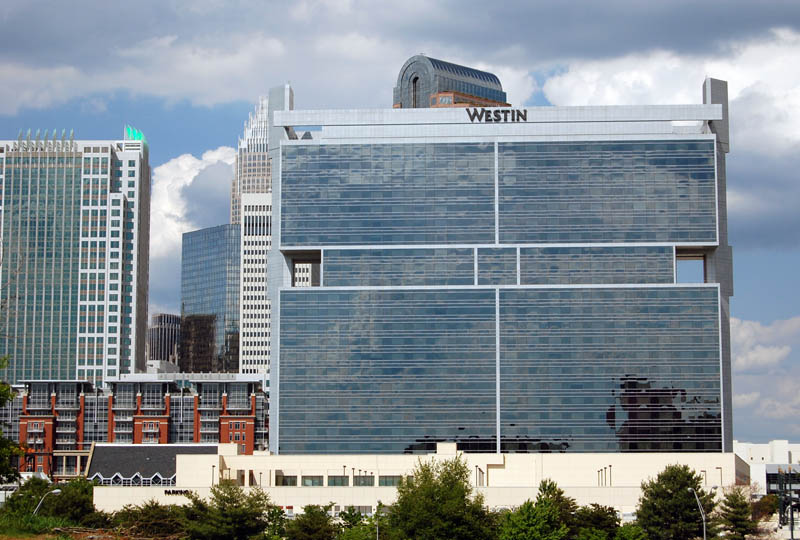
- Interactive map of the The Westin Charlotte area
- Hotel chain: Westin Hotels & Resorts

General information
- Architectural style: Neo-futurism
- Location: 601 S College Street; Charlotte, North Carolina
- Coordinates: 35.2216°N 80.8473°W
- Opened: 2003

Height
- Height: 89 metres (292 ft)

Technical details
- Floor count: 25

Design and construction
- Architect: John Portman and Associates

Other information
- Number of rooms: 700
- Number of bars: 1
- Parking: On site parking garage
- Public transit: Brooklyn Village

The Westin Charlotte is a 293 feet (89 m) tall high-rise in Charlotte, North Carolina, designed by John C. Portman. It was built in 2003 and has 25 floors. It is the largest hotel in Charlotte, with 700 rooms, more than 44,000 square feet (4,000 m^{2}) of convention space, and a 16,276 sq ft (1,512 m^{2}) ballroom.

== See also ==
- List of tallest buildings in Charlotte
