= Lowe's Global Technology Center (Charlotte, North Carolina) =

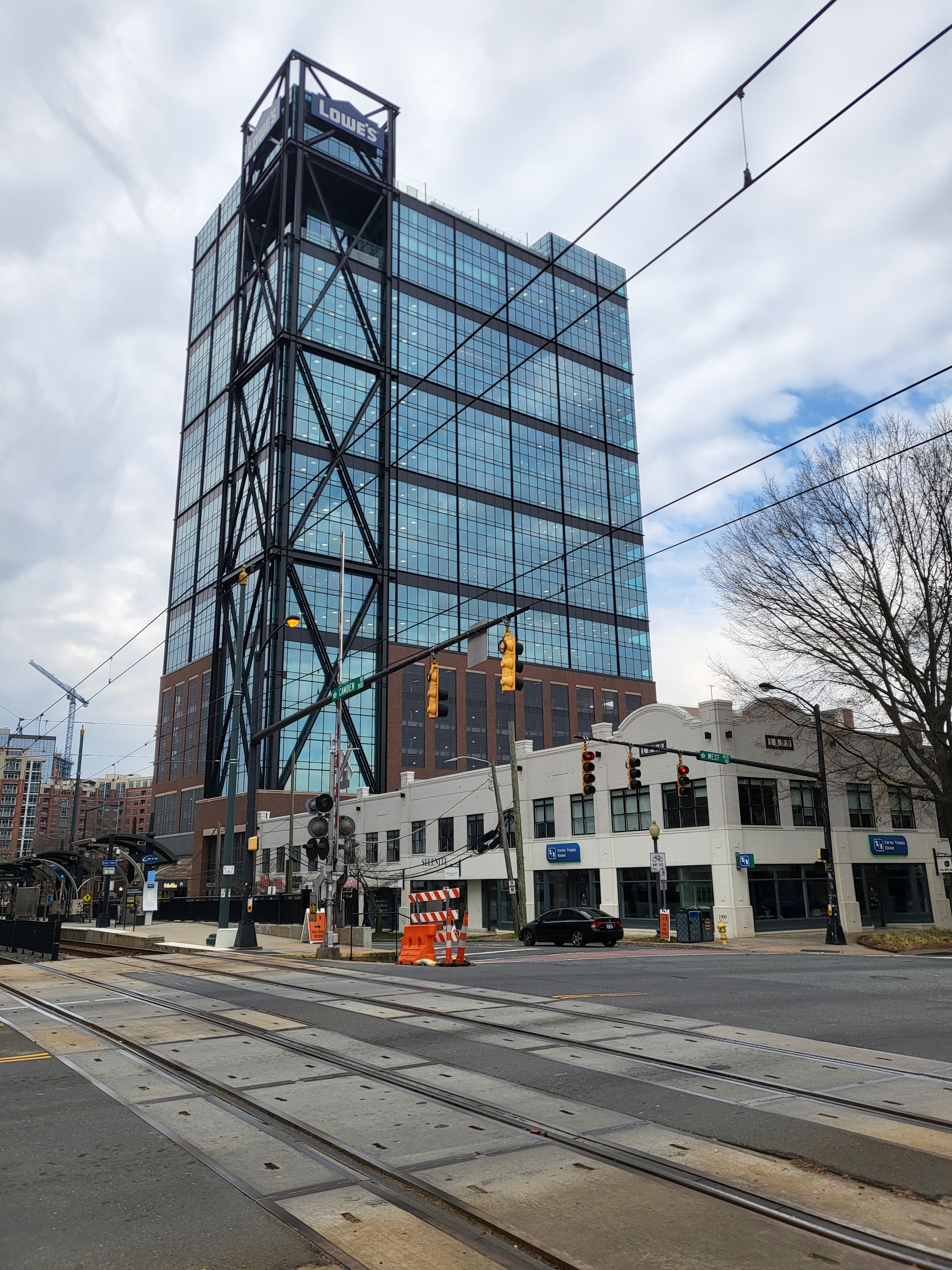
- The building viewed from East Blvd and Camden St in January 2024.
- Interactive map of the Lowe's Global Technology Center area

General information
- Status: Completed
- Type: Office building
- Architectural style: Modern
- Location: 100 W Worthington; Charlotte, North Carolina
- Coordinates: 35°12′43″N 80°51′35″W
- Construction started: August 2019
- Completed: Fall 2021
- Opening: Fall 2021
- Owner: Apollo Global Management

Height
- Roof: 357 ft (109 m)

Technical details
- Floor count: 23

Design and construction
- Architect: Rule Joy Trammell + Rubio
- Developer: RAM and Childress Klein
- Main contractor: Shelco, LLC

Other information
- Parking: On site parking garage
- Public transit: East/West Blvd

The Lowe's Global Technology Center (also known as the Design Center Tower) is a 23-story office building in South End, Charlotte, North Carolina. Completed in 2021, the tower stands at a height of 357 feet (108.81 Meters) making it the tallest building in South End and outside of Uptown Charlotte, slightly taller than The Arlington at 310 feet (94 m). However, in 2025 when Queensbridge Collective Vivian opened with a height of 556 feet (169 m) it took that spot from the building. The building is primarily occupied by Lowe's, which occupies 357,000 square feet (33,166 m^{2}) over 15 floors. The building has an additional 20,000 square feet (1,858 m^{2}) of retail and restaurant space on the ground floor.

== History ==
Lowes will be investing $153 million into the building as a tech hub for 2,000 employees. The company's headquarters in Mooresville will transfer 400 jobs, and the remaining 1,600 employees will be new hires. The state has offered Lowes $54.1 million of incentives for the development of 1,600 new jobs. The state also is awarding Lowe's a $2 million grant from its North Carolina One Fund. Lowe's also considered Dallas for the expansion. Ultimately Charlotte was chosen owing to its proximity to the company's headquarters in Mooresville, North Carolina and the appeal of South End to the millennial population. The generation enjoys living in denser urban areas with access to the light rail, scooters, and an area that is easily walkable.

Lowe's CEO Marvin Ellison views expanding IT as a way to become a better retailer. He believes one of the characteristics of a greater retailer is having a great technology platform. He explains that this project modernizes Lowe's technology systems and drives company growth.

Lowe's has already been hiring for the 1,600 new positions. Prior to the pandemic, these positions were being housing at 200,000 square feet (18,581 m^{2}) of leased space in Charlotte Plaza in Uptown Charlotte, IT employees began moving into this space in June 2019. However, due to the COVID-19 pandemic the Charlotte Business Journal reported that Lowe's has listed 125,000 square of this space for sublease. The remaining 75,000 square feet (6,968 m^{2}) of space will be available for remote employees. Lowe's Charlotte Plaza leases are effective until July 2024. Lowe's recently stated their target move-in is the summer of 2022. The hiring numbers for the 1,600 new positions stands at 1,200 employees.

In November 2021 the building was sold to New York-based Apollo Global Management for $318 million. This sale set a record for the highest price per square foot at $889/sq ft ($9,570/m^{2}). The prior record was set in 2020 for $612 per square foot ($6,590/m^{2}) for the sale of the RailYard in South End. The sale price was $201 million.

Lowe's officially began to occupy the building in August 2022 with 1,000 employees initially working in the building. The hiring process for the 2,000 employees is ongoing as of August 2022. Lowe's has not set a date for when all 2,000 employees will occupy the building.

The design of the office space was intended to encourage collaboration. Some of the specific elements that encourage collaboration are pods featuring sit/stand desks, tables for team huddles, and plenty of whiteboards. The large number of windows on each floor flood the space with natural light and provide inspiring skyline views of Uptown. The building has an innovation lab that provides in-house team focus on emerging technologies that allow for demos of new ways to transform how people work, live, and shop at Lowe's. The two-level auditorium with 168 can be used to host town and tech talks. Other employee amenities include social spaces, cafes, four quiet rooms, and two massage chairs.

Many different tenants occupy the 20,000 square feet (1,858 m^{2}) of ground floor retail. The most notable ground floor retail tenant is Salted Melon Market & Eatery, a health-focused market and fast-casual restaurant created by Reid's Fine Foods. The market will occupy 7,000 square feet (650 m^{2}) of space. It will contain grab and go readymade food, a full-service espresso bar, and a broth bar. The other ground floor retail tenants are Brown Bag Seafood Co., a fast-casual seafood chain and Allbirds, a sustainability focused shoe company, occupying 2,964 square feet (275 m^{2}).

In September 2022 retailer Outdoor Voices began leasing 1,429 square feet (133 m^{2}) of ground floor retail. Outdoor Voices is an athletic apparel store selling items such as sweatpants, leggings, and men's activewear. It is a competitor to other chains with locations in South End such as Lululemon, Anthropologie, Warby Parker, Cava, Barry's and Free People.

In December 2022 Brown Bag Seafood Company opened a 2,542 square feet (236 m^{2}) ground floor retail location in the building. The restaurant is a fast and casual seafood chain based in Chicago, in August 2022 the company opened its first location in the Charlotte region with a restaurant in Birkdale Village in Huntersville. The restaurant allows customers to choose their seafood and how they want the meal presented with choices like tacos, salads, sandwiches, and a grain or vegetable bowl.

== See also ==
- List of tallest buildings in Charlotte
- List of tallest buildings in North Carolina
- List of tallest buildings in the United States
