= 440 South Church =

Skyscraper in Charlotte, North Carolina, US

Coordinates: 35.2254°N 80.8485°W

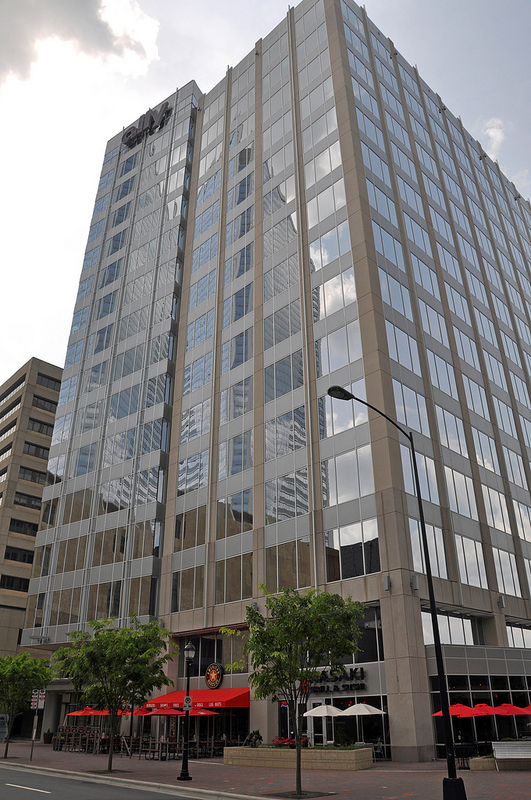
- 440 South Church, also known as the Ally bank building
- Interactive map of the 440 South Church area

General information
- Groundbreaking: June 19, 2008
- Topped-out: March 6, 2009

Technical details
- Floor count: 15
- Floor area: 368,000 square feet (34,200 m^{2})

Design and construction
- Architects: Smallwood, Reynolds, Stewart, Stewart & Associates

440 South Church also known as the Ally Center is a 15-story high-rise in Charlotte, North Carolina with 368,000 square feet (34,200 m^{2}) of space. Smallwood, Reynolds, Stewart, Stewart & Associates designed the building, and Bovis Lend Lease was the general contractor. Major tenants are Ally Financial and HDR. It was built according to LEED gold standards, making it a green building.

== History ==
Novare Group bought 5.13 acres (20,800 m^{2}) at 408 South Church Street for $17 million from The Dilweg Cos. in a deal announced March 27, 2006. This included the five-story 503,000-square-foot (46,700 m^{2}) former Duke Power headquarters, built in 1927, which Duke Energy had vacated in January 2006. The building was demolished February 24, 2007.

On June 19, 2008, Novare Group and Trinity Capital Advisors broke ground on the $78 million 440 South Church project and opened a sales office for Catalyst, a 27-story condominium project, both on the same 5.2-acre (21,000 m^{2}) site between Third Street and Martin Luther King Jr. Boulevard in uptown Charlotte. HDR, an architectural and engineering firm with 140 Charlotte employees, became the first tenant with plans for 45,000 square feet (4,200 m^{2}) of space. The "topping out" ceremony took place March 6, 2009.

In April 2009, GMAC Financial Services, now Ally Financial, announced plans to move its corporate center from Ballantyne to 106,525 square feet (9,896.5 m^{2}) on four floors of 440 South Church, with possible expansion later. At the time, GMAC had 265 Charlotte employees in three business units, with plans to cut as many as 60 jobs. However, 30 new sales jobs and 236 new jobs at the corporate center meant a net increase of 200 jobs. By creating the jobs and keeping them for nine years, GMAC would receive $4.5 million in incentives from the state of North Carolina. Charlotte had many employees with banking knowledge who had been laid off from Wachovia and Bank of America, and GMAC Financial then-CEO Alvaro de Molina, who spent 17 years at Bank of America, lived in Charlotte. The GMAC headquarters, however, remained in Detroit.

Novare kept its investment, but was dropped as an operating partner because the company had significant debts that could result in foreclosures, and auditor Deloitte had "substantial doubt about the company’s ability to continue as a going concern."

HDR moved in during October 2009.

GMAC Financial Services started its move in late November 2009 despite de Molina's unexpected resignation that same month.

In December 2012 Driven Brands announced they will lease the entire 7th floor, 26,753 square feet (2,485.4 m^{2}). The company is the parent companies of Maaco Collision Repair & Auto Painting, Meineke Car Care Centers, Econo Lube N’ Tune, AutoQual, Aero Colours, Drive N Style and Tortal.net. They located from First Citizens Plaza.

In January 2013 Jeld-Wen Inc. announced they had signed a leased for 23,187 square feet (2,154.1 m^{2}) on the fourth floor of the building. The company plans to create 142 jobs over a two-year period in their new Charlotte headquarters. With the signing of Jeld-Wen Inc. the building was 83% occupied. In the same month Trinity Partners, the building's landlord, announced two news about two tenants Just Fresh a fast food restaurant will be leasing 2,025 square feet (188.1 m^{2}). Wyndham Capital Mortgage renewed their lease to expand their space to 23,690 square feet (2,201 m^{2}).

In August 2014 the building was purchased by real estate investment firm Epic UK for $109 million, $296 per square foot. At the time of the sale the building was 99% occupied and the anchor tenant was Ally Financial.

== See also ==
- List of tallest buildings in Charlotte
