= Twelve Hotels & Residences at Third Ward =

TWELVE Hotels & Residences at Third Ward

General information
- Status: Never built
- Location: South Mint and West 2nd Street; Charlotte

Technical details
- Floor count: 39

TWELVE Hotels & Residences at Third Ward was a proposed 39 story skyscraper in Charlotte, North Carolina, US. If built, it would have been located at the intersection of South Mint and West 2nd Streets.

== See also ==
- List of tallest buildings in Charlotte
