= List of tallest buildings in Charlotte =

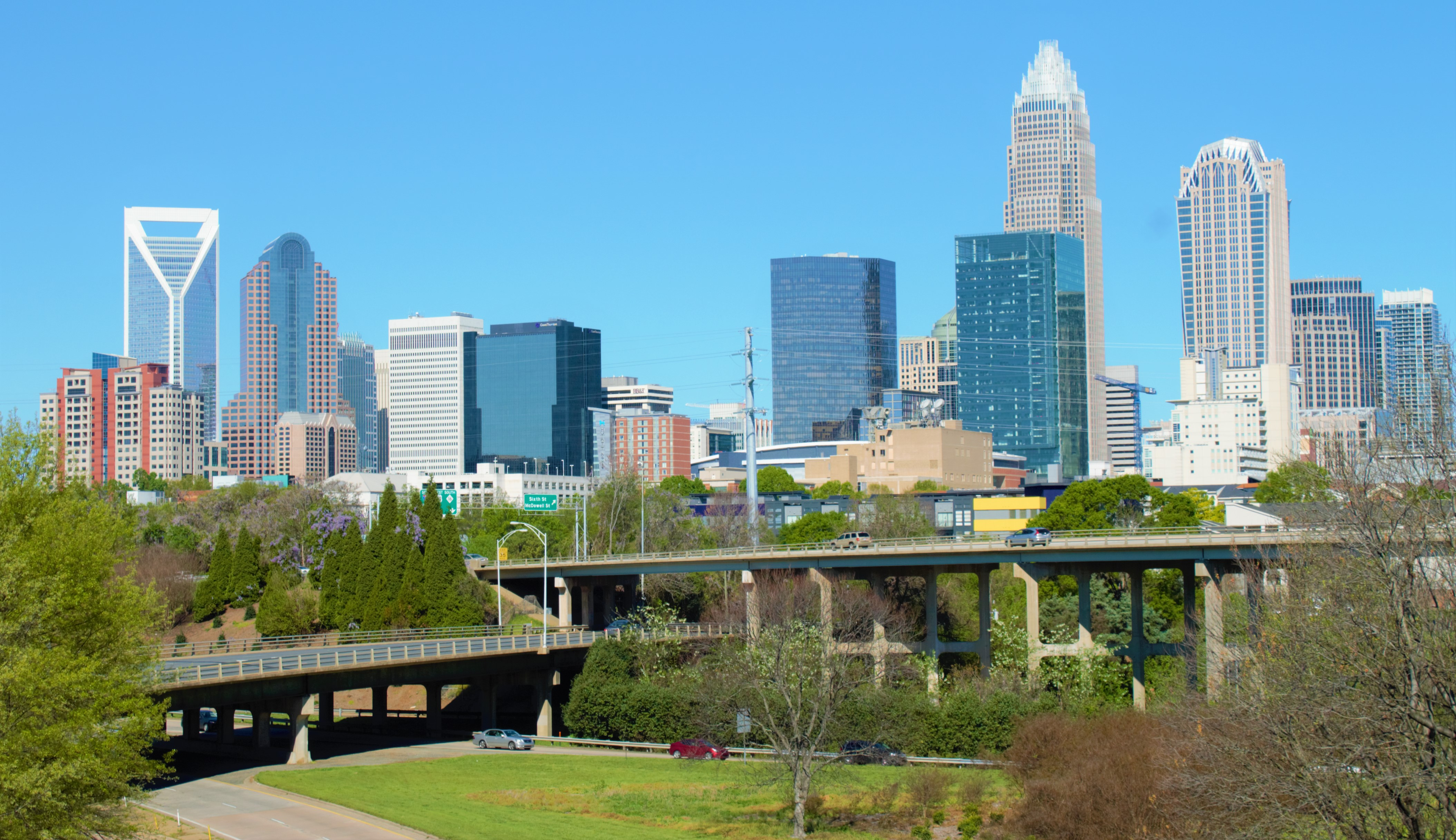
Skyline of Charlotte (Use cursor to identify buildings)

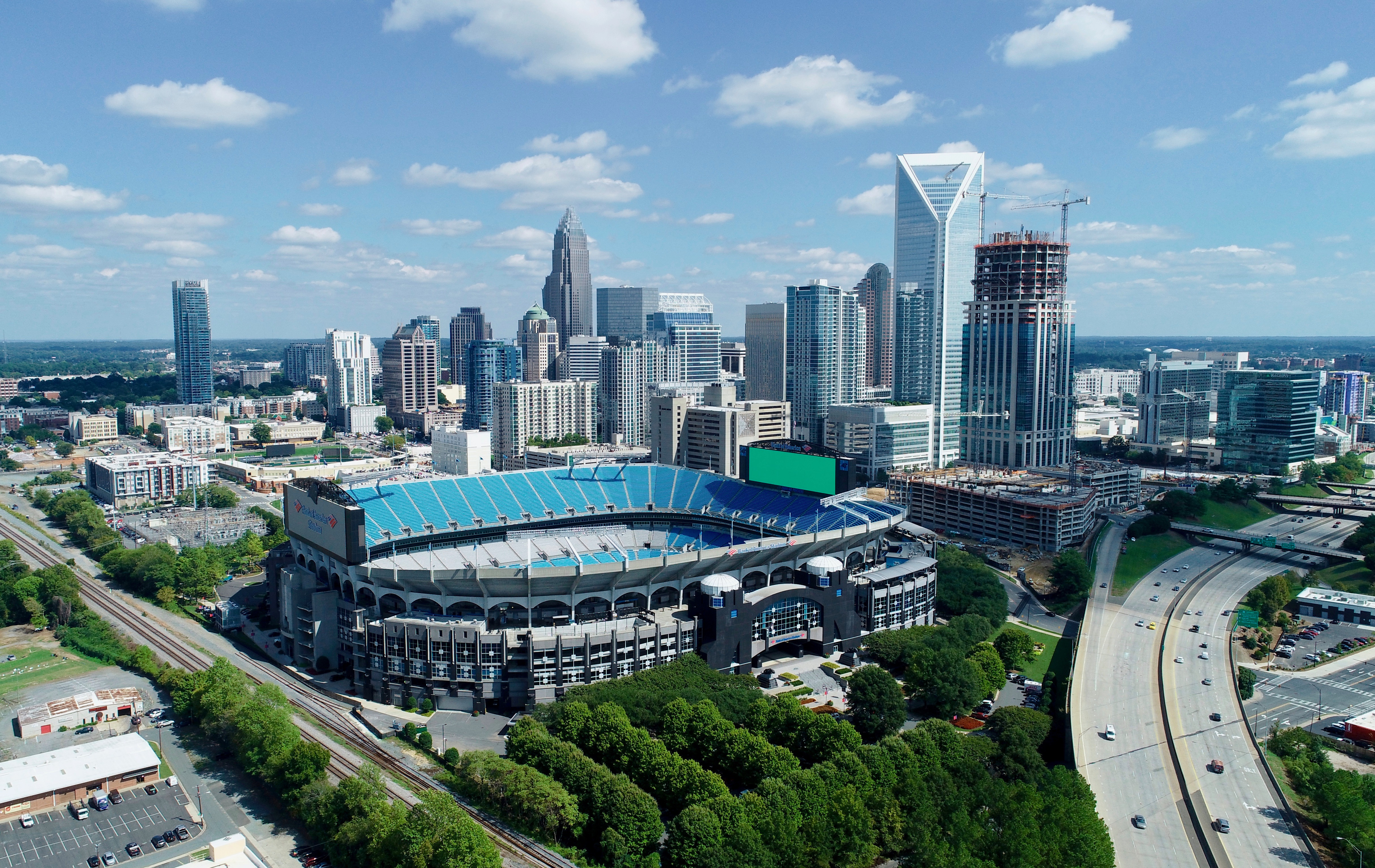
Skyline of Charlotte in 2018

Charlotte, the largest city in the U.S. state of North Carolina, is the site of 70 completed high-rise buildings over 200 feet (61 m), 9 of which stand taller than 500 feet (152 m). The tallest building in the city is the Bank of America Corporate Center, which rises 871 feet (265 m) in Uptown Charlotte and was completed in 1992. It is also the tallest building in North Carolina and the 56th-tallest building in the United States. The second-tallest skyscraper in the city is 550 South Tryon, which rises 786 feet (240 m) and was completed in 2010. The Truist Center, completed in 2002 and rising 659 feet (201 m), is the 3rd-tallest building in Charlotte. Nine of the ten tallest buildings in North Carolina are located in Charlotte.

The history of skyscrapers in the city began with the construction of the Independence Building in 1909. This building, which rose 186 feet (57 m) and 14 floors, is often regarded as the first skyscraper in Charlotte. Despite having been added to the National Register of Historic Places in 1978, it was demolished in 1981 to allow for the construction of One Independence Center. Charlotte's first building taller than 492 feet (150 m) was One South at The Plaza, completed in 1974. The project Queensbridge Collective will be composed of two skyscrapers, the first buildings outside Uptown to rise above 492 feet (150 m). The residential tower broke ground May 24, 2023, and is expected to be completed at the end of 2025. The office tower was changed to be a mixed use building with 400,000 square feet (37,000 m^{2}) of office space across the top 19 floors and 304 apartments across the lower floors. Overall, the Council on Tall Buildings and Urban Habitat ranks Charlotte's skyline (based on buildings over 492 feet (150 m) tall existing or under construction) 4th in the Southeastern United States (after Miami, Atlanta and Sunny Isles Beach), 6th in the Southern United States (after Miami, Houston, Dallas, Atlanta and Sunny Isles Beach), and 19th in the United States. (Note: New York has 293 buildings over 492 feet (150 m) existing or under construction, Chicago has 128, Miami has 56, Houston has 39, Los Angeles has 32, San Francisco has 28, Boston has 20, Seattle has 20, Dallas has 19, Atlanta has 16, Las Vegas has 15, Philadelphia has 14, Jersey City has 12, Sunny Isles Beach has 11, Pittsburgh has 10, Minneapolis has 9, Denver has 8, Detroit has 8, and Charlotte has 8.)

== Tallest buildings ==
As of November 2026, there are 70 high-rise buildings in Charlotte that stand at least 200 feet (61 m) tall, based on standard height measurement. This height includes spires and architectural details but does not include antenna masts. (Note: If two or more buildings are of the same height, they are listed in order of floor count, then alphabetically. The "Year" column indicates the year in which a building was originally completed.) This list includes only buildings that have been completed and not just Topped out.

Rank	Name	Image	Height ft (m)	Floors	Year	Coordinates	Notes
1	Bank of America Corporate Center		871 ft (265 m)	60	1992	35°13′38.3″N 80°50′31.6″W	It is the 456th-tallest building in the world, the 54th-tallest in the United States, the tallest building in North Carolina, the tallest building between Philadelphia and Atlanta, the tallest building constructed in Charlotte in the 1990s, and the tallest office building in the Carolinas. However, with 1,212,176 square feet (112,614.8 m^{2}) of space it is only the 2nd-largest office building in Charlotte by leasable square feet; the largest is 550 South Tryon.
2	550 South Tryon		786 ft (240 m)	48	2010	35°13′26″N 80°50′54.7″W	550 South Tryon is the 851st-tallest in the world, the 97th-tallest in the United States, and the 2nd-tallest in North Carolina. With 1,370,214 square feet (127,297.0 m^{2}) of space it is the largest office building in Charlotte by leasable square feet.
3	Truist Center		659 ft (201 m)	47	2002	35°13′39.2″N 80°50′26.9″W	Truist Center is the 3rd-tallest in North Carolina. It has 970,002 square feet (90,116.1 m^{2}) of space, which makes it the 5th-largest office building in Charlotte by leasable square feet.
4	Bank of America Tower		632 ft (193 m)	33	2019		Bank of America Tower is the 4th-tallest in North Carolina. It is the 8th-largest office building in Charlotte by leasable square feet.
5	Duke Energy Plaza		600 ft (180 m)	40	2022		It has 1,000,000 square feet (93,000 m^{2}) of space, which makes it the 3rd-largest office building in Charlotte by leasable square feet.
6	301 South College		588 ft (179 m)	42	1988	35°13′25.9″N 80°50′40.3″W	301 South College is the 6th-tallest in North Carolina. It is the 4th-largest office building in Charlotte by leasable square feet.
7	The Vue		576 ft (176 m)	50	2010	35°13′51.6″N 80°50′41.3″W	The Vue is the 7th-tallest in North Carolina and it is the tallest residential building in the Carolinas.
8	Queensbridge Collective Vivian		556 ft (169 m)	42	2026		The tower is 42 stories with 409 apartments. It is the tallest building in Charlotte outside of Uptown.
9	One South at The Plaza		503 ft (153 m)	40	1974	35°13′35.8″N 80°50′35.8″W	One South at The Plaza is the 9th-tallest in North Carolina. It is the 7th-largest office building in Charlotte by leasable square feet.
10	1 Bank of America Center		484 ft (148 m)	32	2010	35°13′35.3″N 80°50′26.4″W	1 Bank of America Center is the 10th-tallest in North Carolina. It is the 9th-largest office building in Charlotte by leasable square feet.
11	300 South Tryon (Note: Height estimated by the CTBUH.)		463 ft (141 m)	25	2017	35°13′33.6″N 80°50′46.3″W	11th-tallest in North Carolina. With 638,000 square feet (59,300 m^{2}) of space it is the 14th-largest office building in Charlotte by leasable square feet.
12	121 West Trade		462 ft (141 m)	32	1990	35°13′38.6″N 80°50′38.6″W	12th-tallest in North Carolina.
13	Three Wells Fargo Center		450 ft (140 m)	32	2000	35°13′28″N 80°50′46.7″W	14th-tallest in North Carolina. It is the 6th-largest office building in Charlotte by leasable square feet.
14	Museum Tower		447 ft (136 m)	42	2017	35°13′29.1″N 80°50′55″W	15th-tallest in North Carolina. (Note: Along with the Fifth Third Center.) It has 394 units built on top of the Mint Museum Uptown. It has resort-style amenities on the 43rd floor, with a saltwater pool, a lounge and a game room.
14	201 North Tryon		447 ft (136 m)	30	1997	35°13′43″N 80°50′30.5″W	15th-tallest in North Carolina. (Note: Along with the Museum Tower.) The tower was developed by Trammel Crow Co. for Bank of America. It is the 12th-largest office building in Charlotte by leasable square feet.
16	301 South Tryon		433 ft (132 m)	32	1971	35°13′30.9″N 80°50′42.8″W	18th-tallest in North Carolina. It is the 9th-largest office building in Charlotte by leasable square feet.
17	Avenue		425 ft (130 m)	36	2007	35°13′44.7″N 80°50′32.3″W	19th-tallest in North Carolina. It is a 387-unit condo building on .8 acres developed by Novare Group Inc.
18	400 South Tryon		420 ft (130 m)	32	1974	35°13′29.8″N 80°50′49.6″W	It is the 21st-tallest in North Carolina.
19	Carillon Tower		394 ft (120 m)	24	1991	35°13′42.6″N 80°50′43.2″W	23rd-tallest in North Carolina. It is the 19th-largest office building in Charlotte by leasable square feet.
20	Charlotte Plaza		388 ft (118 m)	27	1982	35°13′29.6″N 80°50′35.9″W	25th-tallest in North Carolina. In November 2024 the building was listed for sale, with 60% occupancy. Also, the building is in special loan negotiations with the lender.
21	The Ellis		384 ft (117 m)	33	2021		549 apartment units with 19,000 square feet (1,800 m^{2}) of retail. It is one of the tallest residential towers in Charlotte, and the 14th-largest apartment complex in the Charlotte area.
22	Ally Charlotte Center		378 ft (115 m)	26	2021		Construction started in December 2016 and the building delivered on May 3, 2021. With 725,000 square feet (67,400 m^{2}) of space it is the 11th-largest office building in Charlotte by leasable square feet.
23	FNB Tower Charlotte		364 ft (111 m)	29	2021		Anchored by FNB Corporation, with 156,000 square feet (14,500 m^{2}) of office space, 196 luxury apartments, and 2,300 square feet (210 m^{2}) of retail space. It broke ground in December 2018. The building opened on July 21, 2021.
24	Lowe's Global Technology Center		357 ft (109 m)	23	2021		It sits across the street from the Design Center of the Carolinas and is anchored by Lowe's. It is the second tallest building outside Uptown.
25	Radius Dilworth Overlook		345 ft (105 m)	26	2025		The complex is composed of 2 apartment towers with a combined total of 626 units with 6,000 square feet (560 m^{2}) of ground level retail. It is also the tallest building in Dilworth
25	Oro Ballantyne		345 ft (105 m)	26	2025		It is a 26-story apartment tower that has 365 units that is split between the high-rise and mid-rise buildings located in Ballantyne Corporate Park.
27	Catalyst		338 ft (103 m)	27	2009	35°13′33.5″N 80°50′53.1″W	With 462 apartments it is the 23rd-largest apartment complex in the Charlotte area.
27	Ascent Uptown		338 ft (103 m)	33	2017	35°13′38.7″N 80°50′48.9″W	It contains 300 units, with 20,000 square feet (1,900 m^{2}) of amenities on the top 2 floors
29	Honeywell Tower		331 ft (101 m)	23	2021		The building contains 373,921 square feet (34,738.4 m^{2}) of leasable space, which makes it the 27th-largest office building in Charlotte.
30	525 North Tryon		330 ft (100 m)	19	1999	35°13′51.9″N 80°50′17.3″W	With 425,298 square feet (39,511.5 m^{2}) of space it is the 24th-largest office building in Charlotte by leasable square feet.
31	TradeMark		325 ft (99 m)	28	2007	35°13′44.4″N 80°50′44.5″W	
32	First Citizens Plaza		320 ft (98 m)	23	1987	35°13′36.7″N 80°50′39.3″W	In April 2023 the property was returned to the lender after the owner defaulted on the loan. At that time the building was 43% occupied.
33	Kingston South End		318 ft (97 m)	24	2024		It is a 24-story residential tower with 324 apartments and 15,000 square feet (1,400 m^{2}) of ground floor retail.
33	600 South Tryon		318 ft (97 m)	24	2025		It is the 4th office tower that is a part of the Legacy Union project. It is the 25th largest office building in Charlotte by square footage.
33	Linea		318 ft (97 m)	24	2025		It is an apartment tower with 370 units along with 18,700 square feet (1,740 m^{2}) of ground-floor retail and restaurant space.
36	The Arlington		310 ft (94 m)	24	2002	35°13′1.8″N 80°51′9.1″W	It was the tallest building outside of Uptown Charlotte until Lowe's Global Technology Center was completed in 2021.
36	Skye		310 ft (94 m)	22	2013	35°13′21.3″N 80°50′27.7″W	It is a 172-room Hyatt Place hotel and contains 69 condos with a 8,000 square feet (740 m^{2}) restaurant on the 20th floor.
38	110 East		305 ft (93 m)	23	2024		It is a 370,000 square feet (34,000 m^{2}) office tower with 7,000 square feet (650 m^{2}) of street level retail. It is the largest office building in South End.
39	One Independence Center		301 ft (92 m)	22	1983	35°13′39.9″N 80°50′34.1″W	It contains 565,694 square feet (52,554.7 m^{2}) of space it is the 18th largest office building in Charlotte by leasable square feet.
40	200 South College		300 ft (91 m)	22	1974	35°13′31.4″N 80°50′37.1″W	The building contains 567,865 square feet (52,756.4 m^{2}) it is the 7th largest office building in Charlotte by leasable square feet.
40	AC Hotel/Residence Inn Charlotte EpiCentre		300 ft (91 m)	22	2018		Construction started in 2015 and it delivered in the spring 2018. With 300 rooms it the 11th largest hotel in Charlotte by number of rooms.
42	200 South Tryon		299 ft (91 m)	18	1961	35°13′35.3″N 80°50′40.9″W	Tallest building constructed in Charlotte in the 1960s.
43	The Westin Charlotte		293 ft (89 m)	25	2003	35°13′18.7″N 80°50′50.1″W	It contains 700 rooms, making it the largest hotel in Charlotte by number of rooms.
43	550 South		293 (89.3)	20	2009	35°13′14.2″N 80°50′38.9″W	
45	The Hilton Charlotte Center City (Note: Height estimated by Emporis.)		292 ft (89 m)	22	1990	35°13′26.1″N 80°50′37.6″W	With 400 rooms it is the 5th largest hotel in Charlotte by number of rooms.
46	650 S Tryon		291 ft (89 m)	18	2020		Second office tower planned on the Legacy Union development site. Construction completed mid November 2020.
47	112 Tryon Plaza		280 ft (85 m)	22	1927	35°13′37.3″N 80°50′37.5″W	Tallest building constructed in Charlotte in the 1920s.
47	JW Marriott Charlotte		280 ft (85 m)	22	2021		Construction started in December 2018. With 381 rooms it is the 7th largest hotel in Charlotte by number of rooms. The hotel opened August 17, 2021.
49	Bell Uptown Charlotte		278 ft (85 m)	22	2014	35°13′36.2″N 80°50′56″W	22-story 352-unit apartment tower across the street from Romare Bearden Park, developed by Childress Klein. It was sold to Bell Partners in June 2022 for $165 million.
50	The Howard R. Levine Center for Education		270 ft (82 m)	14	2025		It will be the Wake Forest University School of Medicine Charlotte campus main education tower containing medical school classrooms.
51	The Ascher Uptown Apartments North Tower		264 ft (80 m)	24	2015	35°13′56.4″N 80°50′14.8″W	One of 2 twin residential towers that combined feature 672 apartments, which makes it the 5th largest apartment complex in the Charlotte area.
51	The Ascher Uptown Apartments South Tower		264 ft (80 m)	24	2017	35°13′54.4″N 80°50′17.6″W	One of 2 twin residential towers that combined feature 672 apartments, which makes it the 5th largest apartment complex in the Charlotte area.
53	Regions 615		260 ft (79 m)	19	2017	35°13′17.5″N 80°50′53.3″W	It contains 375,865 square feet (34,919 m^{2}) of leasable space. Regions Financial anchors the building. The building also contains 300 MUFG Union Bank employees.
54	Charlotte Marriott City Center		252 ft (77 m)	19	1984	35°13′40.6″N 80°50′36.9″W	It contains 446 rooms, which makes it the 2nd largest hotel in Charlotte by number of rooms.
54	Omni Charlotte Hotel		252 ft (77 m)	19	1977	35°13′35.3″N 80°50′33.5″W	With 373 rooms it is the 8th largest hotel in Charlotte by number of rooms.
56	129 West Trade		250 ft (76 m)	17	1958		Tallest building constructed in Charlotte in the 1950s.
57	Le Méridien Charlotte		238 ft (73 m)	18	1973	35°13′2.4″N 80°50′18.7″W	The hotel was previously part of the Blake Hotel, which had 605 rooms. In early 2015 the former hotel completed a $20 million renovation to become The Sheraton and Le Méridien. Le Méridien is the 11th largest hotel in Charlotte by number of rooms.
57	Sonesta Charlotte Lower South End		238 ft (73 m)	18	1983		It has 300 rooms and is ranked as the 11th largest hotel in Charlotte.
59	The Francis Apartments		230 ft (70 m)	19	2018		$150 million mixed used development by Crescent Communities and CNM Enterprises in Uptown Charlotte. It contains 459 apartments, a 38,000 square feet (3,530 m^{2}) and 23,000 square feet (2,137 m^{2}) of additional retail space.
60	Kimpton Tryon Park		226 ft (69 m)	18	2017	35°13′34.4″N 80°50′47.6″W	With 217 rooms it is the 25th largest hotel in Charlotte by number of rooms.
60	Bond on Mint		226 ft (69 m)	17	2025		It is a 17-story apartment building located at the corner of Mint St and Morehead St in South End with 393 units.
62	Ritz-Carlton Charlotte		225 ft (69 m)	17	2009		150 room hotel built by Bank of America for $500 million combined cost for 1 Bank of America Center and the hotel. The bank has an agreement with the hotel to cover their losses in order to keep the hotel open. Also, bank employees will receive discounted rates.
62	Johnston Building		225 ft (69 m)	17	1924		In December 2024 Charlotte City Council approved a redevelopment of the entire building to become a 245-room hotel.
64	Uptown 550		223 ft (68 m)	21	2019		21 story apartment tower that along with a 6-story building contains 421 apartments.
65	Charlotte-Mecklenburg Government Center		214 ft (65 m)	14	1988		
66	440 South Church		212 ft (65 m)	16	2009		The building contains 365,000 square feet (33,900 m^{2}), Ally Financial anchored the building from 2009 to moving into Ally Charlotte Center in 2021.
66	Towerview at Ballantyne		212 ft (65 m)	16	2021		Announced in October 2019 by Northwood Ravin as Ballantyne Corporate Park's first apartment tower. The 16-story building with an attached low-rise building have 212 apartments. The building was part of the early stages of Ballantyne Reimagined.
66	The Line		212 ft (65 m)	16	2022		A 16-story building developed by Portman. Foundry Commercial became the first tenant of the building starting on May 16, 2022.
69	Capitol Towers North		200 ft (61 m)	10	2017		Developed by Charlotte-based Lincoln Harris, located in South Park on a 6 acres (2.4 ha) site behind Piedmont Town Center. The towers were built as speculative buildings, with no tenants signed on prior to construction.
69	Capitol Towers South		200 ft (61 m)	10	2015		Developed by Charlotte-based Lincoln Harris, located in South Park on a 6 acres (2.4 ha) site behind Piedmont Town Center. The towers were built as speculative buildings, with no tenants signed on prior to construction.

== Tallest under construction ==
As of November 2026, there are 6 buildings that are under construction, or under demolition, or in site prep in Charlotte that are planned to rise at least 200 feet (61 m). (Note: Any buildings that have been topped out but are not completed are also included.)

Name	Image	Height ft (m)	Floors	Year	Notes
1111 South Tryon		540 ft (160 m)	43	2028	Mixed-use tower with 400,000 square feet (37,000 m^{2}) of office space across the top 19 floors and 304 apartments across the lower floors. It is the second phase of Queensbridge Collective. Upon completion it will be the 26th largest office building in Charlotte and the largest in South End.
Centrum Dilworth		437 ft (133 m)	33	2029	The building will be mixed use containing 420 apartments and 32,000 square feet (3,000 m^{2}) of office space. It is being developed by Centrum Realty & Development and Sorelle Capital on an 1.8 acres (0.73 ha) lot at the corner of Worthington Ave and South Blvd.
1200 Metropolitan		357 ft (109 m)	27	2027	Northwood Ravin is planning to build a 27-story 283-unit apartment tower at the corner of Metropolitan Avenue and South Kings Drive. In 2020 Northwood purchased the 1.3 acres (0.53 ha) site for $2.25 million from J.P. Morgan Chase & Co. The rezoning was approved in April 2021 originally for 330 apartments. It will broke ground in early 2024.
1320 South Tryon		292 ft (89 m)	14	2028	White Lodging is developing a 14 story 295 room hotel on a .63 acre lot in South End. The company purchased the lot in December 2023 for $8. It broke ground in July 2026.
Anova The Pearl		240 ft (73 m)	20	2029	The building is a 20-story apartment building being built at The Pearl with 382 units, with 19 units reserved for low-income residents. In 2021 Atrium promised that affordable housing would be a part of the district. Construction will begin in August 2026.
4415 Sharon		225 ft (69 m)	15	2028	Amwins is building a 250,000 square feet (23,000 m^{2}) headquarters building in SouthPark. The building will have 9 floors of offices space over 6 stories of parking. Amwins' 500 employees will move into the 7 floors in the fourth quarter of 2028

== Tallest approved ==
These buildings have either been approved, issued permits, or awaiting construction

Name	Height ft (m)	Floors	Year	Notes
Southern Land Company Residential Tower	437 ft (133 m)	33	2028	It is a mixed-use tower with 300 luxury apartments that will be built on the former site of Tyber Creek Pub. It is being developed by Southern Land Company on a 1 acre (0.40 ha) parcel at the corner of Tremont Ave and South Blvd which combines lots 1919, 1923 and 1933 South Blvd. The historic building at 1923 South Blvd., which was part of the land purchased by Southern Land Company, was relocated to 1829 Cleveland Ave. Tyber Creek closed on March 18, 2024. Grounding breaking is planned for late 2026.
900 South McDowell	238 ft (73 m)	18	2029	Northwood Ravin is developing an 18-story 328 unit apartment building at 900 South McDowell, right next to The Pearl. The developer purchased the 1.3 acre property for $11.25 million in June 2025 from Duncan-Parnell. The building should break ground in 2026.
The Gallery Office Tower	275 ft (84 m)	19		On 3.87 acre site in SouthPark currently occupied by single-story retail building Hines is planning a 250,000 square feet (23,000 m^{2}) office tower.
The Gallery Mixed Use Tower	275 ft (84 m)	19		On 3.87 acre site in SouthPark currently occupied by single-story retail building Hines is planning a 19 story 302 apartments and 50,000 square feet (4,600 m^{2}) of retail space with a significant portion of that space being on the ground floor to create an activated plaza.
Carson & Tryon Office Building	411 ft (125 m)	31	2025	It is a 31-story mixed use tower with 565,000 square feet (52,500 m^{2}) of office space, 200 room hotel, 10,000 square feet (930 m^{2}) of retail, and 200 residential units. The 3 acres (1.2 ha) site is currently occupied by an Enterprise Rent-A-Car location at the corner of Carson and Tryon at 1102 S Tryon St. The developers Crescent Communities and Nuveen Real Estate paid $37 million for the four parcels from different owners that make up the site. Crescent Communities applied for building permits with Mecklenburg County on October 14, 2024, although a ground breaking date has not been set. In October 2024 it was reported by the Charlotte Business Journal that Charlotte's largest law firm Moore & Van Allen will anchor the building. However, Moore & Van Allen agreed to anchor 1111 South Tryon instead.
Carson & Tryon Hotel	265 ft (81 m)	20	2025	200 room hotel that is a part of the development Carson & Tryon. The development also includes a 31-story mixed use tower with 565,000 square feet (52,500 m^{2}) of office space, 10,000 square feet (930 m^{2}) of retail, and 200 residential units. The 3 acres (1.2 ha) site is currently occupied by an Enterprise Rent-A-Car location at the corner of Carson and Tryon at 1102 S Tryon St. The developers Crescent Communities and Nuveen Real Estate paid $37 million for the four parcels from different owners that make up the site Construction will start in 2023 and complete in 2025.
VeLa Uptown	368 ft (112 m)	32	2026	379 luxury apartments which are being developed at 200 E. Seventh St., former site of the Levine Museum of the New South. The .7 acres (0.28 ha) site at the corner of East Seventh and North College was purchased on March 13, 2022, for $10.75 million. It will also include 4,000 square feet (370 m^{2}) of retail and 20,000 square feet (1,900 m^{2}) of resident amenity space. The project cost is $170 million. Construction will begin in 2025 and complete in the 4th quarter of 2026.
205 E Bland St	265 ft (81 m)	20	2026	Cousins Properties is planning a 200,000 square feet (19,000 m^{2}) office building on a .9 acres (0.36 ha) parking lot. The building will also include ground-floor retail and onsite parking. The lot was purchased in November 2020 as part of a larger $28.1 million deal that also gave Cousins nearby parking lot 1401 S. Tryon St. and 200 E. Bland St.
Camden Exchange	398 ft (121 m)	30	2026	Apartment tower with 315 units, 10,000 square feet (930 m^{2}) of ground floor retail, and 10,000 square feet (930 m^{2}) of office space occupied by Catalyst. It is being developed by Catalyst Capital Partners and Stiles Corp and it will be built on the former site of Price's Chicken Coop located at 1600 and 1604 Camden Road. It will break ground in late 2024.
Intercontinental Hotel at Belk Place	451 ft (137 m)	34	2026	It will contain 244 room luxury hotel, which will make it the 22nd largest hotel in Charlotte by number of rooms. Construction started in February 2018, on hold due to the COVID-19 pandemic's effect on the Charlotte hotel business Will become the tallest hotel in the Southern United States outside of Atlanta upon completion. The hotel developer, Salter Brothers, announced in June 2023 the project is back on track. Construction will start in summer 2024 and complete in mid-2026.
1427 South Blvd	411 ft (125 m)	31	2027	Washington, D.C. developer Akridge and Virginia-based property management company Kettler are developing a 31-story 450 unit apartment building on a .9 acres (0.36 ha) lot. The building will also include ground level retail, a resort style pool, fitness center, and co-working space. The companies purchased the lot on December 20, 2022, for $13.5 million. It is currently occupied by businesses Modern Man, Savvy Seconds Consignment, Fresh Nails, Lucky Fish and Destined To Make It. It will break ground in 2024.
401 South College			2027	Animal investment firm and Millennium Venture Capital in December 2022 purchased the building for $24 million. The site is 2.3 acres. However, Charlotte Regional Visitors authority swapped a 1.9-acre parcel at 501 South Caldwell St for a .7-acre parcel on the site at the corner of College Street and Martin Luther King Jr. Blvd. A 1.6-acre site remains available for the development, which will be divided into two parcels. On one of the parcels will be a high-rise multifamily tower with 350 to 400 units. Construction is expected to start in late 2025.
1426 S Tryon St.	265 ft (81 m)	20		Highwoods Properties Inc. in May 2022 purchased the lot across the street from the Railyard for $27 million. Currently occupying the site is a low-rise building containing an ABC store. A mixed-use building with 300,000 square feet (28,000 m^{2}) of office space and 250 apartments is planned.
South End Station Building 1	212 ft (65 m)	16		Cousins Properties is planning a 2 building 700,000 square feet (65,000 m^{2}) mixed use complex at 200 E Bland; where All American Pub, Hot Taco and Slate are currently located. The complex will include a potential 300 multifamily units, retail and office space. The lot was purchased in November 2020 as part of a larger $28.1 million deal that also gave Cousins nearby parking lots 1401 S. Tryon St. and 205 E. Bland St.
South End Station Building 2	212 ft (65 m)	16		Cousins Properties is planning a 2 building 700,000 square feet (65,000 m^{2}) mixed use complex at 200 E Bland; where All American Pub, Hot Taco and Slate are currently located. The complex will include a potential 300 multifamily units, retail and office space. The lot was purchased in November 2020 as part of a larger $28.1 million deal that also gave Cousins nearby parking lots 1401 S. Tryon St. and 205 E. Bland St.
1435 South Tryon	318 ft (97 m)	24		Cousins Properties is planning a 24-story mixed tower on the site of a surface parking lot. It will have office space and a multifamily component. The land was part of a 2.2 acre $20 million purchase in November 2020 that also included 200 East Bland. The development of 1435 South Tryon and 200 East Bland will break ground in a year or two.
1175 Pearl Park Way	275 ft (84 m)			Pappas Properties is a planning a three building development in midtown that is the final phase of a multi phase development in the area. The three building includes a 275-foot apartment tower with 425 units, 150-room hotel, 100,000 square feet (9,300 m^{2}) of office space, 35,000 square feet (3,300 m^{2}) of retail on a 2.2-acre lot.

== Timeline of tallest buildings ==
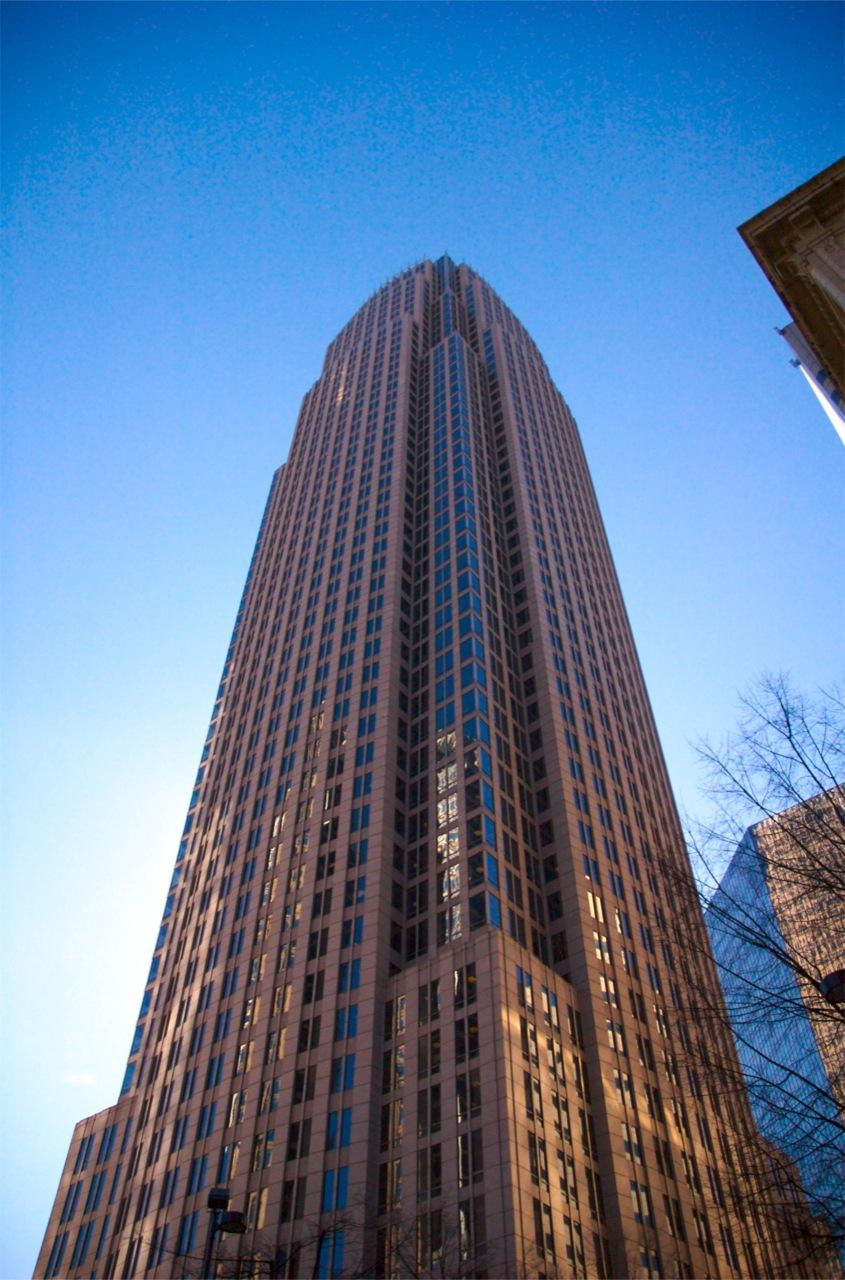
The Bank of America Corporate Center has been the tallest building in Charlotte since 1991.

Since 1909, the year the first high-rise in the city was constructed, the title of the tallest building in Charlotte has been held by eight high-rises.

Original name	Years as tallest	Height ft (m)	Floors	Reference(s)
Independence Building (Note: Demolished in 1981.)	1909–1924 (15 years)	185 ft (56 m)	14	
Johnston Building (Note: Original height unknown. 17 floors since 1929.)	1924–1926 (2 years)	225 ft (69 m)	17	
112 Tryon Plaza	1926–1961 (35 years)	280 ft (85 m)	22	
200 South Tryon	1961–1971 (10 years)	299 ft (91 m)	18	
Two Wells Fargo Center	1971–1974 (3 years)	433 ft (132 m)	32	
One South at The Plaza	1974–1988 (14 years)	503 ft (153 m)	40	
301 South College	1988–1991 (3 years)	588 ft (179 m)	42	
Bank of America Corporate Center	1991–present (35 years)	871 ft (265 m)	60	

== See also ==
- Uptown Charlotte
- List of tallest buildings in North Carolina / the United States / the world
- List of tallest buildings in Asheville
- List of tallest buildings in Greensboro
- List of tallest buildings in Raleigh
- List of tallest buildings in Winston-Salem
