= Bank of America Corporate Center =

Headquarters of Bank of America and skyscraper in Uptown Charlotte, North Carolina

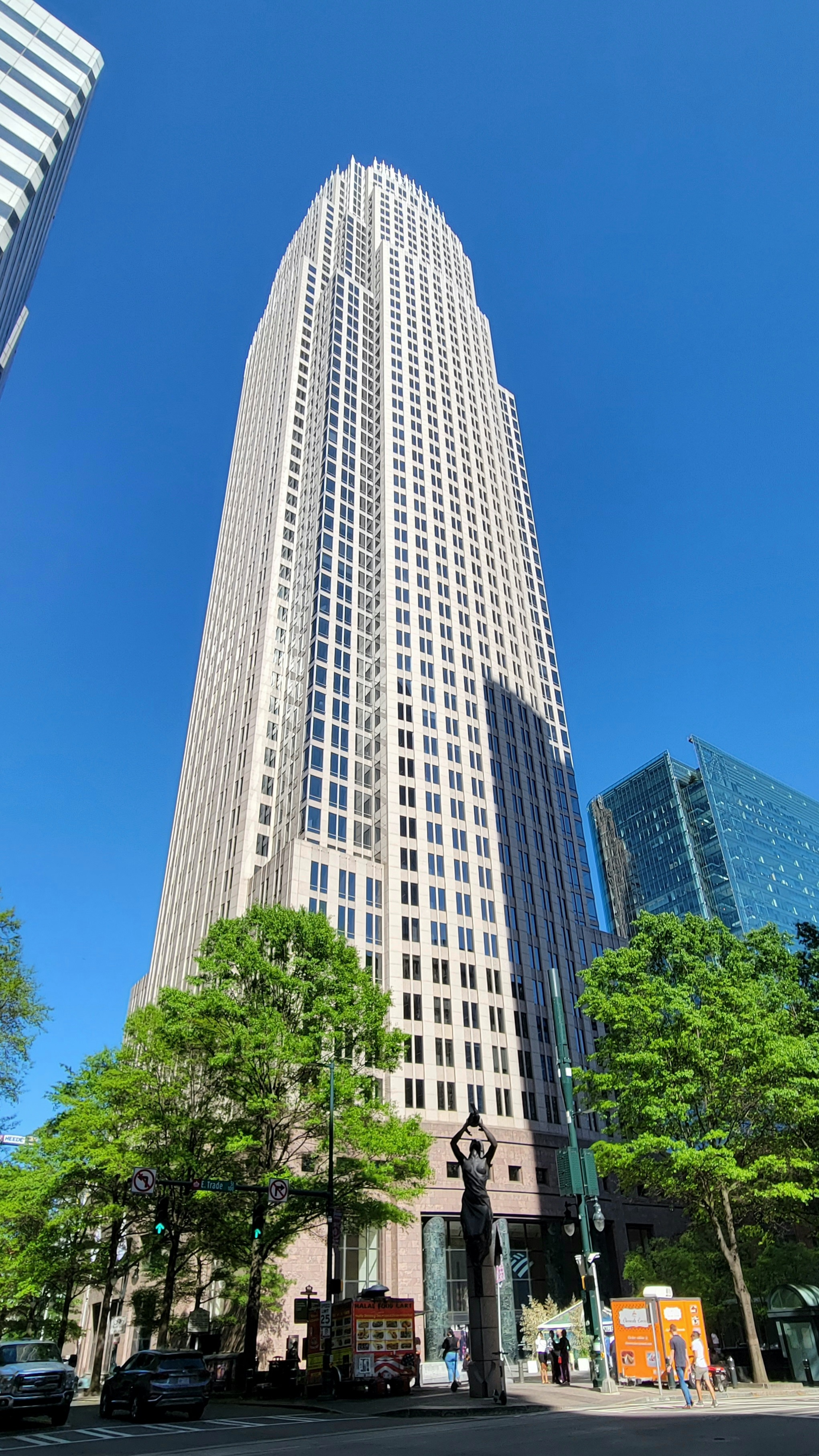
- Bank of America Corporate Center in 2022

General information
- Location: 100 North Tryon Street; Charlotte, North Carolina, U.S.
- Construction started: November 18, 1989; 36 years ago
- Topped-out: October 2, 1991; 35 years ago
- Completed: July 1992; 34 years ago
- Opening: October 17, 1992; 33 years ago
- Owner: Bank of America

Height
- Roof: 871 feet (265 m)

Technical details
- Floor count: 60
- Floor area: 1,212,176 square feet (112,614.8 m^{2})

Design and construction
- Architects: Cesar Pelli and HKS Architects

Other information
- Public transit: Tryon Street

The Bank of America Corporate Center is an 871 ft (265 m) skyscraper in Uptown Charlotte, North Carolina. Designed by Argentine architect César Pelli and HKS Architects, and best known as the headquarters of the namesake Bank of America, it has been the tallest building in North Carolina since its 1992 construction, the 61st-tallest building in the United States, and the 174th-tallest building in the world.

Sometimes locally referred to as the "Taj McColl" after former Bank of America CEO Hugh McColl, who was responsible for the tower's construction, on a clear day the tower is visible to the naked eye from 35 miles (56 km) away.

== Amenities ==
=== Ben Long Frescoes ===
Located in the Corporate Center's lobby are three frescoes that measure 18 by 23 feet (5.5 m × 7.0 m) each and are the largest secular fresco in the United States. Created by North Carolinian artist Ben Long and a team of nine artists, the frescoes were completed in approximately four months in 1992. The three frescoes are a triptych, three related works, which was inspired by Shingon. The first panel Making/Building, on left, depiction of the construction of the Corporate Center. A row of workers holding golden spades appear at the bottom, while at the top is another worker, a leader, holds a spade as he gazes into the distance towards a figure asleep on the hill. The second panel Chaos/Creativity, at center, depicts a jostling crowd of figures of various occupations, while a circle of six nude figures spin above the crowd, creating a contrast. The third panel Planning/Knowledge, on right, is a portrait of a young boy, geometric shapes, a pyramid, people in the lower-left corner in a discussion, a dancing girl, and a figure sitting by a burning tree.

=== Blumenthal Performing Arts Center ===
Connected to the Corporate Center, along East 5th Street, the Blumenthal Performing Arts Center contains three performance halls: Belk Theater, Booth Playhouse, and Stage Door Theater.

=== Founders Hall ===
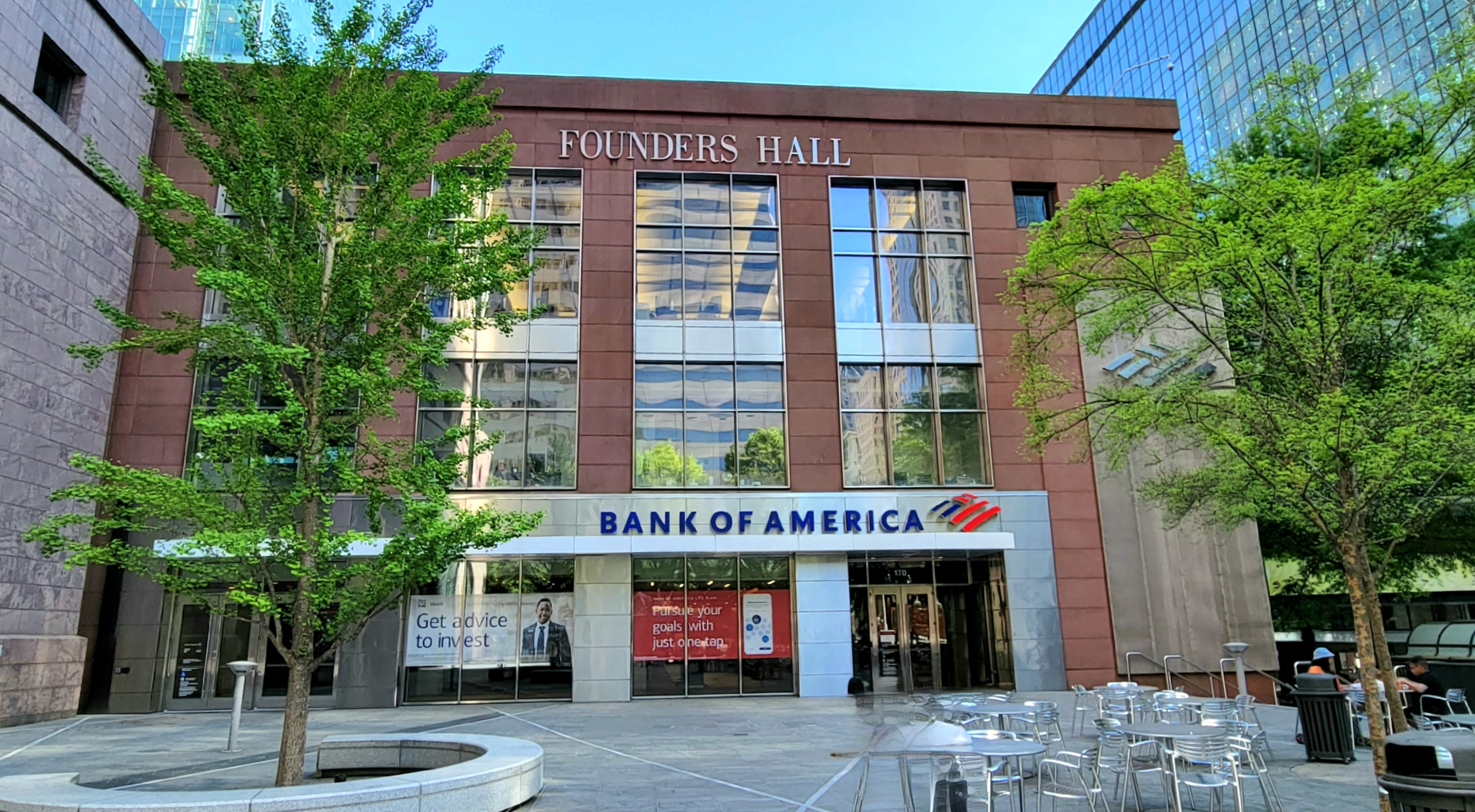
Founders Hall

Connected to the Corporate Center, Founders Hall is a large vaulted atrium that features red-brown marble floors and a water fountain. Ringed around it are two levels of retail and restaurants, which are part of the Overstreet Mall, and is connected by skybridges to neighboring Bank of America Center, One South at The Plaza, and Truist Center.

== History ==
=== Announcement ===
On Wednesday, December 10, 1986, North Carolina National Bank announced that it would construct what would become the Corporate Center. Jointly developed with Charter Properties, the project was initially announced as a 50 story tower to be constructed with a 350-room hotel and what would become the North Carolina Blumenthal Performing Arts Center. The initial design for the 50 story tower was created by Charlotte-based Odell Associates. Its design featured a circular tower complete with a Greek cross lying flat on top to pay homage to the intersection of Trade and Tryon.

Additionally, its construction resulted in the demolition of an entire city block bound by North Tryon, East Trade, North College and East 5th Streets. The most notable buildings lost in its construction were the Belk department store, constructed in 1908, along East Trade and the Efird's department store, constructed in 1922, on North Tryon.

=== Design competition ===
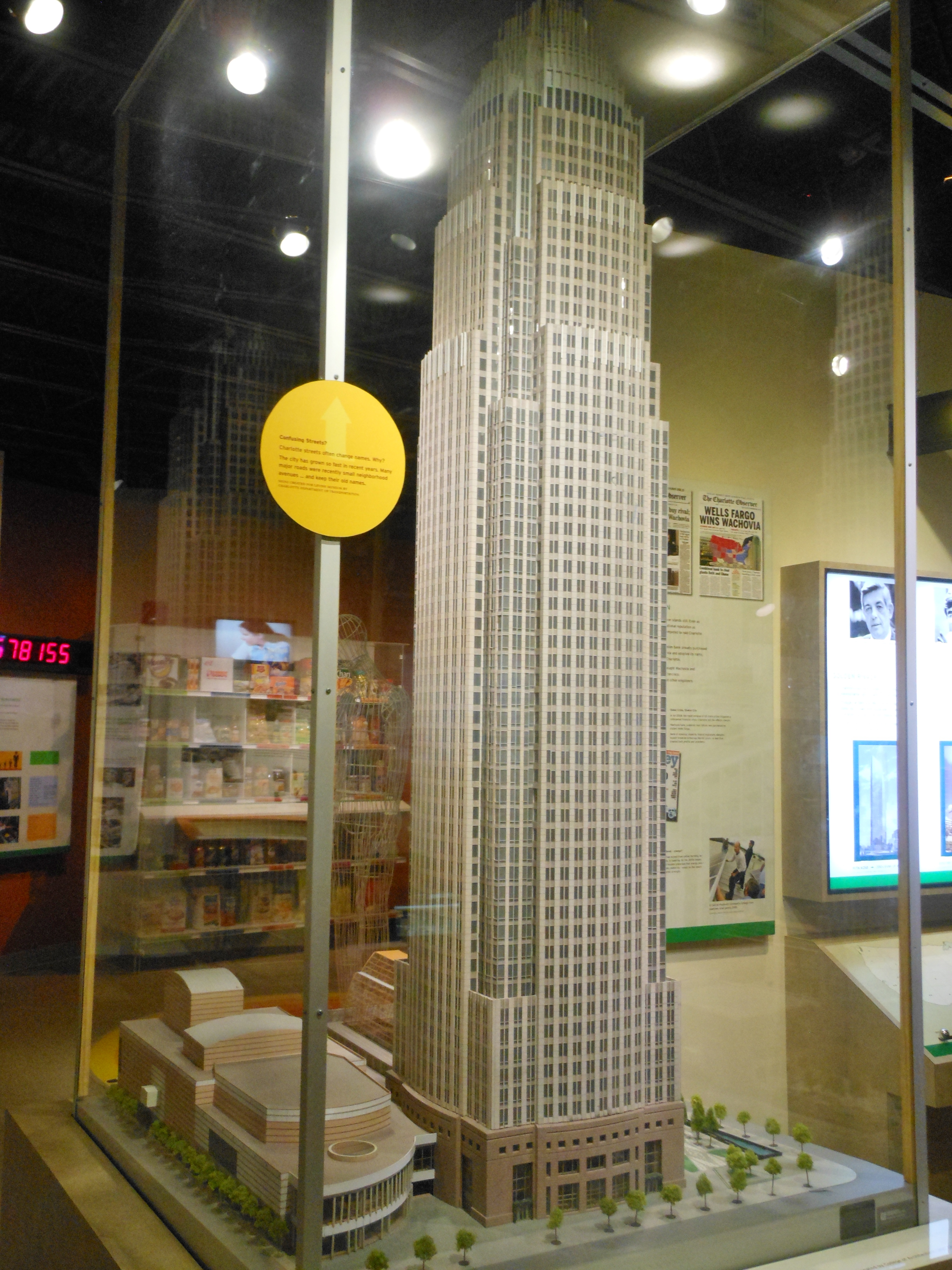
Bank of America Corporate Center architectural model at Levine Museum of the New South

On Monday, July 20, 1987, NCNB announced Lincoln Property as a general partner for the project. With the development team set, the process of hiring an architect of the project commenced in August 1987.

The architectural firms that competed for the job included:

- I.M. Pei of New York City
- Skidmore, Owings and Merrill of Chicago
- Cesar Pelli & Associates of New Haven, Connecticut
- HKS Architects of Dallas
- John Burgee Architects of New York City
- WZMH Group of Dallas
- Kohn Pedersen Fox Associates of New York City

On Friday, September 25, 1987, the Cesar Pelli design was announced by NCNB Chairman Hugh McColl as being selected for the project. Additionally at the press conference it was revealed that the tower would be between 55-60 stories tall, sheathed in granite and be officially named the NCNB Corporate Center.

After winning the contract, its design was unveiled eight months later to the public on Tuesday, June 14, 1988. The final design was the 60 floor tower seen today. It features a 30-foot (9.1 m) granite base along North Tryon Street followed by a facade of rosy beige granite and silver glass rising complete with curved sides. The tower gradually tapers through a series of six setbacks at the 13th, 44th and 53rd floors on the corners and at the 47th, 56th and 60th floors on the face as it reaches the tip of its crown 871 feet (265 m) above Tryon Street.

=== Construction ===
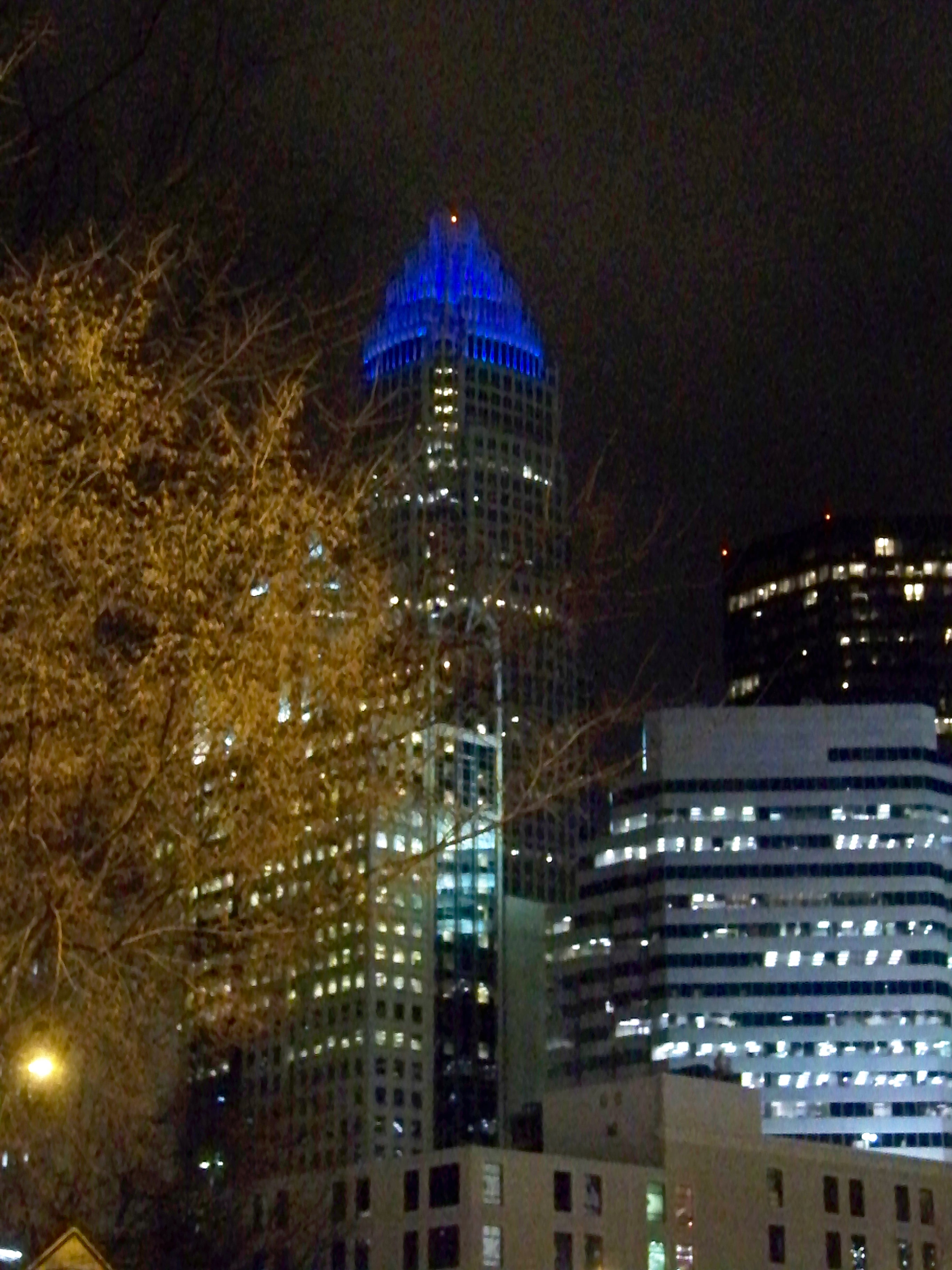
Bank of America Corporate Center with its crown lit in blue for a Carolina Panthers home night game

On Tuesday, January 3, 1989, demolition commenced on the block where the tower would eventually rise. The demolition work would take just over seven months to complete before excavation could commence. Site preparation would continue from August through November. During the excavation for the foundation, contractors found threads and flakes of gold embedded within pieces of granite removed from the site. The discovery was not unexpected as Charlotte was the center of America's first gold rush during the 1830s.

On November 19, 1989, the initial concrete pour was completed signaling the beginning of actual construction. The mat foundation consists of a thick slab containing 3,500 cubic yards (2,700 m^{3}) of concrete and 150 tons of reinforcing steel at the center of the tower. The foundation reaches 38 feet (12 m) below Tryon Street at its deepest point with the tower being supported by 36 concrete and steel piers. These piers are able to withstand the 150,000 lb/sq ft (730,000 kg/m^{2}) placed upon them by the 300,000,000-pound (136,080,000 kg) structure.

After only a couple of months, construction was temporarily halted after Hurricane Hugo slammed Charlotte with 90 mph (140 km/h) winds causing some damage on-site on Friday, September 22, 1989.

By November 1990, the tower had reached its 30th floor and as a result had risen to being the 5th tallest within Charlotte. On Wednesday, March 20, 1991, the tower officially became both Charlotte's and North Carolina's tallest when it reached a height of 589 feet (180 m) at its 47th floor to surpass the 588-foot (179 m) tall One First Union Center. The tower was officially topped-out on Wednesday, October 2, 1991 with the final concrete pour completed. From this point, the 95-foot (29 m) tall crown was installed with its completion coming in December bringing the tower to its final 871-foot (265 m) height.

By January 1992, the tower had since been renamed the NationsBank Corporate Center to reflect the bank's name change from NCNB to NationsBank in summer 1991. On May 1, the first tenants moved into the tower with its inaugural crown lighting taking place on May 9.

Completed in July 1992, its official dedication ceremony took place on Saturday, October 17, 1992. The celebrations that day included live entertainment, rappellers from Fort Bragg's 16th Military Police Brigade rappelling the height of the tower and a fireworks show.

=== Post-opening ===
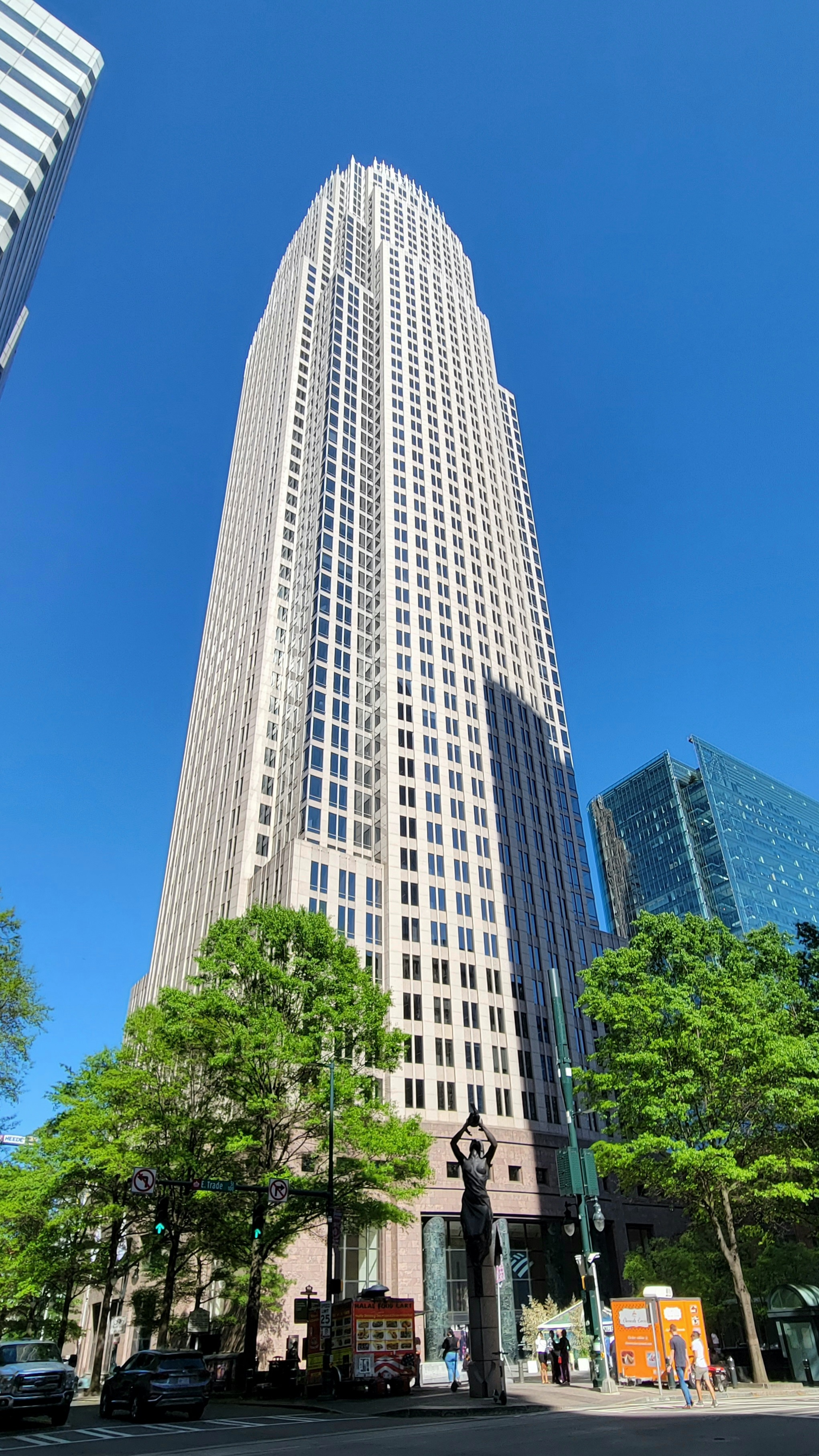
Bank of America Corporate Center as seen from the corner of S Tryon and W Trade Streets

Since its completion, the Bank of America Corporate Center has been the world headquarters for what is now Bank of America. NationsBank bought BankAmerica Corporation in 1998, changed its name to Bank of America and sold BankAmerica's headquarters at 555 California Street, then the Bank of America Center, in San Francisco. Law firm Moore & Van Allen and Ernst & Young are also tenants in the tower. However, both companies will be moving into the mixed use building 1111 South Tryon in 2028, which is part of the Queensbridge Collective development in South End currently under construction.

The Bank of America Corporate Center's crown shaped spire is the focal point of the building and it makes it stand out architecturally. Its spire does not reflect from the outside like the Chrysler Building or any others; it shines from within and instead of stainless steel there is glass illuminated by floodlights, making it stand out from the many world skyscrapers. Bank of America began shining the top of the crown shaped spire from white to blue in honor of the Carolina Panthers who were NFC champions in the 2003–2004 NFL season. In 2017 it was announced LEDs had been installed in the spire.

On July 20, 2005 Ken Lewis, then CEO and Mr. Cyprian White of the Credit Bureau of the Bank of America, announced the construction of a brand new 150 key Ritz-Carlton and LEED certified 40 story office retail complex located adjacent to the Bank of America Corporate Center.

== FAA controversy ==
On May 15, 1989, a ruling by the Federal Aviation Administration stated that the tower's height would potentially jeopardize some flights taking off and landing at Charlotte-Douglas International Airport. The ruling came even though Charlotte's dominant airline, USAir, and airport officials had determined that the tower was not a hazard. A June 12 appeal filed with the regional FAA office in Atlanta upheld the original ruling resulting in the case being appealed to Washington. Although the FAA could not force NCNB to halt construction of the tower, its "declaration of hazard to air navigation" could have potentially cost the city millions in federal airport grants as well as impeding the ability of NCNB to secure insurance for the tower upon its completion.

By December 1989, the issue was resolved when the FAA ruled that slight changes in air-traffic procedures around the building would resolve the hazard posed by the 871-foot (265 m) tower. With the influence of both U.S. representative Alex McMillan and Senator Ernest Hollings, the reversal of the original ruling was made after further review by the FAA. Since its construction, there has not been an incident involving an aircraft and the tower.

== See also ==
- List of Skyscrapers
- World's tallest structures
- List of tallest buildings by U.S. state
- List of tallest buildings in Charlotte
- List of tallest buildings in North Carolina

Preceded by One First Union Center	Tallest Building in Charlotte; 1992—Present; 265 m	Succeeded by None
