= Skye (Charlotte) =

Building in Charlotte, North Carolina, United States

Coordinates: 35.2226°N 80.8411°W

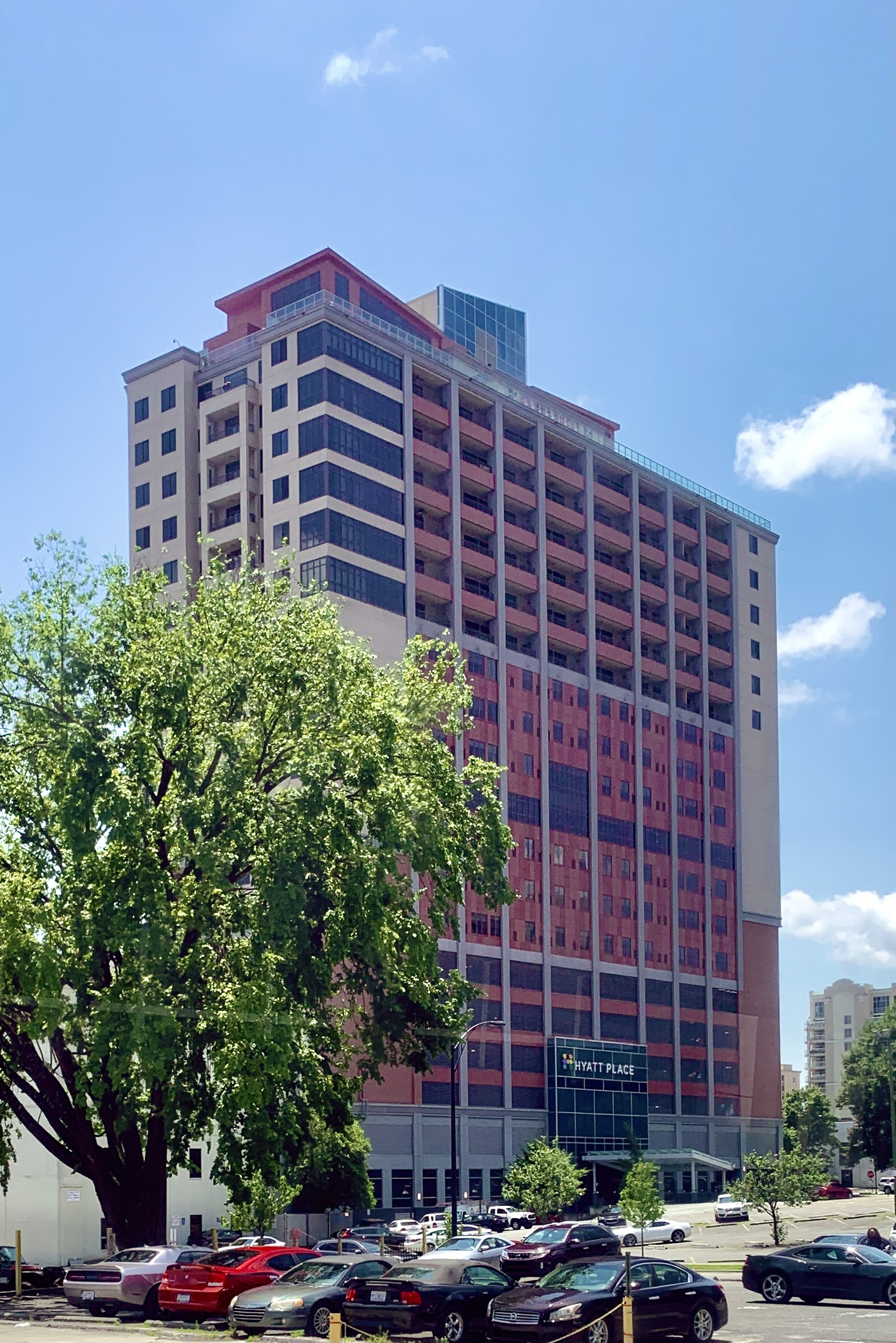
Skye

Skye, formerly known as The Park, is a 22-story building at Caldwell and Third Streets in Charlotte, North Carolina that includes a 172-room Hyatt Place hotel opened October 15, 2013, and a 69-unit condominium development.

In 1985, developer Pete Verna built the Charlotte National Building and a parking garage designed to be the base of a skyscraper. Both structures were four stories; the Charlotte National Building included the facade of the First Citizens Bank building which was demolished for First Citizens Plaza. Architect/preservationist Jack Boyte described the reconstructed facade as "classical Greek temple architecture."

In 2000, downtown Charlotte's first luxury condominium development, The Park, was announced. The project was delayed by an uncertain economy after the September 11 attacks. Originally, Charlotte's second tallest residential building was to have 126 units, but the number changed to 105 units so they could be larger; sizes would range from 504 to 1,859 square feet (46.8 to 172.7 m^{2}). Four levels of parking already existed at the site; the fifth through ninth floors would be parking as well. Construction was set to begin in June 2004, with completion in Fall 2005. A rooftop park with a swimming pool was inspired by Fairmont Hotel in San Francisco.

In January 2006, after many delays, construction was ready to start on the $46 million project, with Verna & Associates as general contractor and 222 S. Caldwell St. Partnership, whose managing director was Pete Verna, as the developer. 80 of 107 units ranging from 1000 to 1,800 square feet (170 m^{2}) had been sold. Completion of The Park was set for December 2007. In March 2008, with Verna claiming the project was 80 percent finished, work slowed and eventually stopped. On August 7, lender BB Syndication Services Inc. of Wisconsin bought The Park for $17.9 million in a foreclosure auction. Verna himself eventually filed for Chapter 11 bankruptcy and the project was put on hold. A subsidiary of Small Brothers LLC of Naples, Florida bought the building in 2009 for $4.5 million.

The new developers decided to add more hotel rooms due to the demand that resulted from Charlotte hosting the 2012 Democratic National Convention. However, a month before the convention, Small Brothers Charlotte LLC could only promise that the exterior of the building would look finished. The completion date was 2013, and 14 buyers had taken steps toward purchases.

The ground floor will include 2,600 square feet (240 m^{2}) of retail space. A first-floor lobby will have "stone flooring and wall panels with wood accents and include imported marble and granite." Hotel guests will use a modernist/art deco tenth-floor lobby with its own elevators.

Perkins Eastman is the project architect. Cleveland Construction of Mentor, Ohio will complete construction.

The name Skye was chosen because of the views from the planned rooftop restaurant Fahrenheit, to open in January 2014.

The Hyatt Place opened October 15, 2013. More than half of the condominiums were already sold.
