= Kingston South End (Charlotte, North Carolina) =

Coordinates: 35.2126°N 80.8573°W

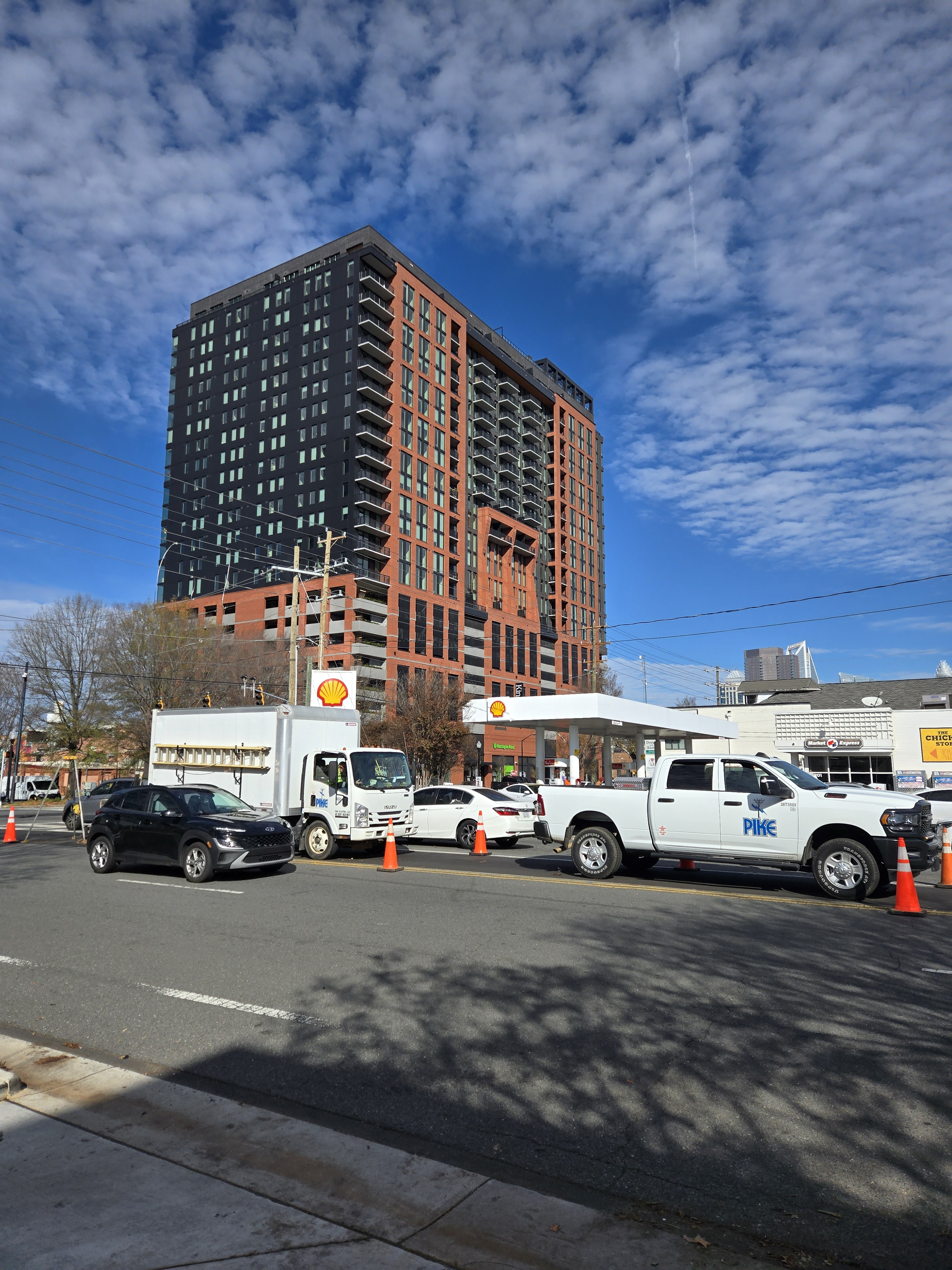
- Kingston South End pictured in December 2025.
- Former names: Ascent South End

General information
- Status: Completed
- Type: Residential building
- Location: 124 E Kingston Ave; Charlotte, North Carolina
- Construction started: December 2021
- Opening: October 2024
- Owner: White Point Partners and Greystar

Height
- Roof: 318 feet (97 m)

Technical details
- Floor count: 24
- Floor area: 590,000 sq ft (55,000 m^{2})

Design and construction
- Architect: R2L
- Developer: White Point Partners and Greystar
- Structural engineer: SK&A Structural Engineers
- Main contractor: Greystar

Other information
- Parking: 472 spots
- Public transit access: East/West Blvd

Kingston South End is a 24-story transit oriented residential building in South End Charlotte, North Carolina. Upon completion it will be 318 feet (97 m).

== History ==
White Point Partners specializes in mixed use and adaptive reuse of multifamily, retail, and office properties. Its signature Charlotte project is Optimist Hall, a former gin mill that received a $60 million adaptive reuse renovation to become a food hall and office space leased to Duke Energy. This vision really fits this area of South End at E Kingston and South Blvd. Although Dilworth Artisan Station is not directly a part of the project it is also owned by White Point and is directly behind the project. It has been preserved since it fits with the project vision, it hosts many artists' studios, its two buildings date back to 1909 and 1950. The 4 parcels of land that make up Ascent South End's site contained a former restaurant, an abandoned convenience store, a single story Walgreen's, and a small 2 story former brewery.

The property acquisitions that shaped the development of the building occurred in 3 separate transactions over a 2-year period from 2019 to 2021. In February 2019 White Point Partners purchased the Dilworth Artisan Station at 118 E Kingston for $8.7 million, although this property is not part of the four parcels that make up Ascent South it is important to the project. After purchasing the property, it was rezoned as transit-oriented development-mixed use. The rezoning of Dilworth Artisan Station was another step in the creation of the 3.5-acre lot the building occupies. The adaptive reuse of Dilworth Artisan Station, the Ascent South End's amenities such as co-working space and extensive gathering spaces and the 400,000 square feet (37,161 m^{2}) office building being developed at 1728 South Blvd. are a part of White Point Partner's vision to transform the entire block into a "live, work, and play" destination.

The final two transactions were closed in June 2021 for $17.1 million. One of the transactions White Point Partners and Greystar completed was to acquire two parcels located at addresses 1700 South Blvd which included a parking lot and 1708 South Blvd which contained a two story 18,946 square feet (1,760 m^{2}) building. This two-story building was formerly a brewery for Atlanta-based New Realm Brewing Co. New Realm Brewing had a brewery located at 1708 for 4 years. Prior to the brewery it was 1950s manufacturing facility owned by Boulevard Films. The third and final transaction included the permanently closed Rosemont and 120 E Kingston. The rezoning petition for 3.5 acres along South Boulevard to rezoned as mixed use was approved by city council in June 2021. About an acre of the 3.5 acres has been rezoned as transit-oriented development urban center, the most flexible and dense transit-oriented zoning. This acre was for the lots with addresses 1700 and 1708 South Blvd., 1714 South Blvd. is the location of the building.

The building delivered in October 2024. At the time of delivery White Point did not have any retail tenants to occupy the 13,000 square feet (1,208 m^{2}) of ground-floor retail space. However, Walgreens, which previous occupied a building next door that was torn down, is expected to occupy some of that retail space. Huntington National Bank opened a ground-floor branch in the building in November 2025.

== Building design ==
The building will include 324 apartments and 15,000 square feet (1,394 m^{2}) of ground floor retail. The apartments will range in size from microunits to three-bedroom units with two three-bedroom penthouse units. They will have many high-end features such as custom closets, elevated appliance and fixture packages, and highly functional kitchens. It will have 20,000 square feet (1,858 m^{2}) of amenity space for residents to include extensive communal gathering spaces, co-working offices, and a fitness center. The rooftop terrace features will include hammocks, fire pits, a sky bar, and added spaces for events and general recreation. Another important feature of the building will be its many green initiatives such as lighting control strategies and safer materials, EV charging stations, and smart thermostats.

The exterior and interior design of the building have been carefully crafted by R2L Architects and EoA Group for interior design. The exterior has been specifically designed as reminder of South End's past as a warehouse and industrial district, it will feature a largely masonry exterior and oversized windows. The gold and brass accents on the exterior are intended to reference Charlotte’s days as an important national gold mine location. The interior's use of brick masonry, concrete, and deep crimson colors were used to match the exterior's industrial and warehouse reminiscent design. SK&A Structural Engineers designed the concrete structure including post-tensioned slabs, columns, shear walls, and pile cap foundations.

== See also ==
- List of tallest buildings in Charlotte
