= Queensbridge Collective =

Buildings in Charlotte, North Carolina, U.S.

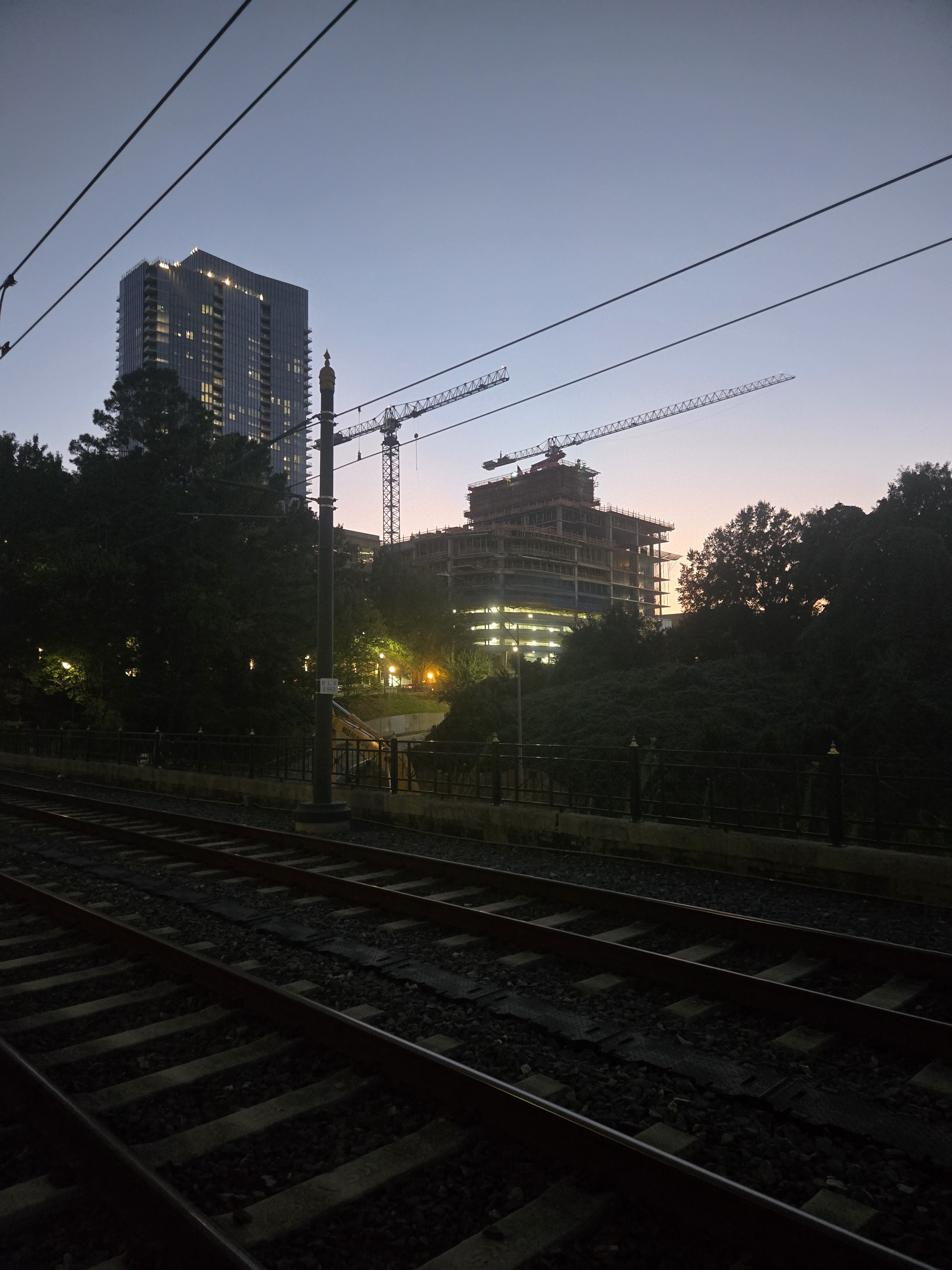
- Queensbridge Collective complex in August 2026.
- Location: South End, Charlotte, NC
- Status: Under Construction
- Groundbreaking: May 2023
- Estimated completion: 2028
- Website: queensbridgecollective.com

Companies
- Architect: Goettsch Partners
- Contractor: Clark Construction Group
- Developer: Riverside Investment & Development Co., Woodfield Development
- Manager: Woodfield Development

Technical details
- Cost: $725 million
- Buildings: 1111 South Tryon Street, Queensbridge Collective Residential Tower
- Size: 2.75 acres (1.11 ha)

Queensbridge Collective, formerly known as 1111 South Tryon, is a two-building development under construction in the South End neighborhood in Charlotte, North Carolina. It broke ground in May 2023.

== Site history ==
The recent history of the site where Queensbridge Collective is being built can be traced back to a 1920s fire insurance map, the two-story Uptown Cabaret building, which formerly occupied the site at East Morehead and Tryon, had been built by 1929. (Some real estate records, however, report it being built in 1932). Starting in 1934, the building was occupied by Reese's Antiques Shop, until the store moved to another location in 1954. In 1956, business owner E. B. Stone renovated the building and moved his company, E. B. Stone Finance Co., onto the second floor. At E. B. Stone Finance's peak, 100 of its employees worked in the building. After the 1956 renovations, the building's first floor was also occupied by various other offices and businesses, including an IBM Service facility, Palmetto Security Services (c. 1973), and Carolina Plasma Corp. (c. 1975), among others.

In 1984, E. B. Stone Finance dissolved, and the building was sold to Joseph and Diane Vandevere of Key Realty. After the sale, the premises was rented for short periods by several businesses, including a computer store, a carpet store, a print shop, and a map store.

In 1995, the building at Morehead and Tryon was purchased and converted into a strip club by Daniel Seeman and his business partner Brian Dominick. Originally known as The Dollhouse, the name of the club was later changed to the Uptown Cabaret. In July 2007, it was announced that the Uptown Cabaret was under consideration as a possible location for a condo development built by Raleigh-based developer Lichtin. Dominick confirmed this inquiry. However, he did not then suggest that the development was a serious possibility.

In August 2004, Dominick purchased a 1.1-acre lot from Boone-based Oscar Investors Management for $3.14 million; at that point, the lot was occupied by the Ascot Inn, which had been at the site since 1963. Dominick and his investment group demolished the Ascott Inn in August 2011; at that time, Dominick again alluded to future development plans for the site.

In December 2004, just months after the purchase of the Ascot Inn lot, Dominick and Tom Wicker took control of the entire block by purchasing an 11,000 square foot (1,000 m^{2)} former car lot for $613,000.

In April 2010, Dominick purchased a diner originally located in Kings Mountain, North Carolina, and reopened it as the 24-hour Midnight Diner on the premises he had purchased in 2004. The Midnight Diner operated in that location until 2021 when it was moved to a new site near Spectrum Center in uptown Charlotte.

== Development history ==
In December 2021, around the same time the Midnight Diner announced its move, Chicago developer Riverside Investment & Development Co. paid $35 million for seven parcels of land (totalling 2.75 acres (1.11 hectares)) at Morehead and Tryon that had been occupied by the Midnight Diner and Uptown Cabaret. During the planning stages there was no word of the Uptown Cabaret opening in another location. The original plans called for three towers for a project cost totaling $750 million. It is designed to link the growing South End neighborhood with Uptown Charlotte, which is why the name Queensbridge Collective was chosen and this name was revealed in March 2022. The three buildings included a 42-story office tower with 750,000 square feet (70,000 m^{2}) of space, a 38-story apartment tower with 350 units, and a 30-story apartment tower with 300 units.

In August 2022, the Midnight Diner announced it would close on September 5, 2022, to have the building moved to 420 E Trade Street in Uptown Charlotte. The Trade St site occupies a portion of a surface parking lot. The Midnight Diner move preparation was originally intended to take 10 to 14 days and 45 to 60 days were scheduled for construction at the new site. At 1:30 AM on November 2, 2022, the Midnight Diner was towed by a large truck from 115 E. Carson St. to 420 E. Trade. The mile journey took 90 minutes. The entrance to the diner was moved by a crane within a week, after the building was secure on its new foundation.

In September 2022, Riverside announced that the development has been changed to consist of 2 buildings instead of 3. The 42-story office building remained unchanged however the 2-apartment towers were merged into 1 larger building. However, prior to groundbreaking in May 2023, the office tower was reduced to 35 stories. The residential tower was adjusted to be 45 stories and contain 400 units. The changed occurred because after announcing the 3 buildings in March 2022 a geological survey revealed the site water table was higher than originally thought. Therefore, eliminating 1 of the 2 residential towers allowed an above ground parking structure to be created. The parking structure is on stories 2 through 9 and consists of 2,000 spots.

Part of the new development will be road improvements. Riverside worked with Charlotte's transportation and planning departments to determine the best improvements. Morehead Square Drive, South Tryon, East Morehead St, and East Carson will be widened. Also, new bike lanes and pedestrian crossings, along with a connection to the Carson Boulevard light rail stop, will be added. The College Street Connector was destroyed, it's possible a new connector will be created.

On May 16, 2023, it was announced that Riverside Investment & Development Co. had scheduled May 24, 2023, as the development groundbreaking ceremony. The groundbreaking featured representatives of Clark Construction Group, Riverside Investment, Woodfield Development, Goettsch Partners, and CBRE. The ceremony location was 111 East Carson Blvd.

The residential tower began site work after the groundbreaking ceremony. The Uptown Cabaret, which occupied the site of the office tower, closed on July 1, 2023, and the building was torn down shortly thereafter. Riverside Investment & Development Co. stated that commercial real estate markets conditions will govern when the office tower begins construction. Woodfield Development is partnering with Riverside Development, Chad Hagler, development partner at Woodfield said vertical construction on the tower will start before the end of 2023.

In June 2024 Night Swim Coffee was the first retail tenant to announce they will be part of the 25,000 square feet (2,300 m^{2}) of retail in Queensbridge Collective Residential Tower. They plan to open the location in late 2025 In January Guard and Grace, a steakhouse from Denver, became the second retail tenant by announcing they will open a location with rooftop views in mid-2026. It will be a 10,224 square feet (949.8 m^{2}) space with indoor and outdoor seating. The third retail tenant, announced in March 2025, will be Chicago-based restaurant FARE. It will occupy a 1,500 square feet (140 m^{2}) space along South Tryon St. The building topped out February 6, 2025 and it will deliver in the third quarter of 2025.

In September 2025 Riverside announced it was starting the second phase of the development. Due to commercial real estate market conditions, the building was changed from being an office building to mixed used. The new plans consisted of a 43-story building with 356,000 square feet (33,100 m^{2}) of space across the top 17 floors and 346 apartments spread across the lower floors. The catalyst for starting construction was Charlotte law firm Moore & Van Allen sign a 15-year lease for 206,000 square feet (19,100 m^{2}) spread across the top 9 floors. Currently, the law firm occupies 165,000 square feet (15,300 m^{2}) at Bank of America Corporate Center. Once the building is complete the firm's 700 Charlotte employees will relocate to the building. In October 2025 California-based Pacific Life Insurance Company announced it had signed a lease for 68,000 square feet (6,300 m^{2}) of space for 301 Charlotte employees. The company is expected to occupy the space beginning in 2028.

In December 2025 Ernst & Young announced they had signed a lease for 45,000 square feet (4,200 m^{2}) across two floors. EY is currently located at Bank of America Corporate Center and they will move into the space in 2028. In response Riverside decided to expand the building's office space to cover the top 19 floors spanning 400,000 square feet (37,000 m^{2}). To accommodate the change, it will now contain 304 apartments instead of 346. EY's lease brings the building to 90% pre-leased. Part of the success of the building's pre-leasing is it is one of the only high-rise office buildings in the city currently under construction.

== See also ==
- List of tallest buildings in North Carolina / the United States / the world
- List of tallest buildings in Charlotte
