= The Arlington =

Building in Charlotte, North Carolina

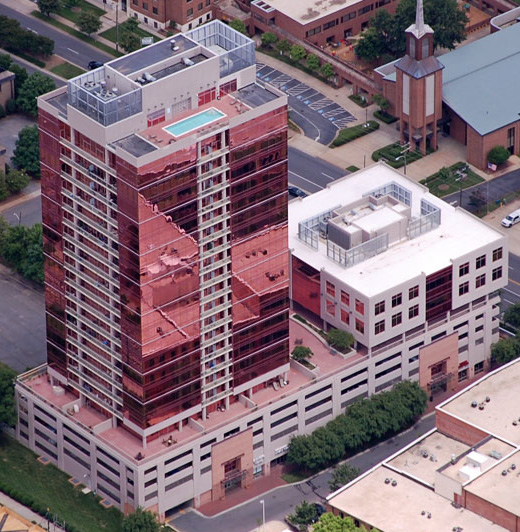
- Interactive map of the The Arlington area

General information
- Status: Completed
- Type: Mixed Use
- Coordinates: 35.217174°N 80.852343°W
- Completed: March 2003
- Opening: March 2003

Height
- Antenna spire: 310 feet (94 m)

Technical details
- Floor count: 24

Design and construction
- Architect: LS3P
- Developer: Jim Gross, (formerly with) The Metropolitan Group
- Main contractor: Beers Skanska

Other information
- Parking: On site parking garage
- Public transit access: Carson

The Arlington is a 310 feet (94 m) tall mixed-use high-rise in Charlotte, North Carolina. The building was the first residential high-rise and first mixed use high-rise development in the city. The developer, Jim Gross, is also noted for the first downtown residential development (Ivey's) and the first loft-style development in the city (Factory South) among many other developments. It was completed in 2003 and has 24 floors and an outdoor swimming pool on the roof.

It was originally planned to be 425 ft (130 m) and 42 stories tall when announced in September 1997, but it was scaled back because the developer was unable to secure the financing required to build a 425-foot (130 m) building. Because the building is located outside the I-277 inner-loop, the apartments on the city-side of the building have a fantastic view of the Charlotte skyline.

A residential tower with some office and commercial space, The Arlington is well known because of its pink glass. Local nicknames include "The Pink Building", "Big Pink", “The Pink Lady” and "Pepto-Bismol." The actual color of the glass is "Desert Rose" or "6F2828". The color does not tint views from the inside.

The building is notable for being the location of Nikko's, a large modern sushi restaurant which is one of Charlotte's hottest night spots.

== See also ==
- List of tallest buildings in Charlotte
- List of tallest buildings in North Carolina
- List of tallest buildings in the United States
