= Catalyst (building) =

Apartment building in Charlotte, North Carolina, United States

Coordinates: 35.2262°N 80.8492°W

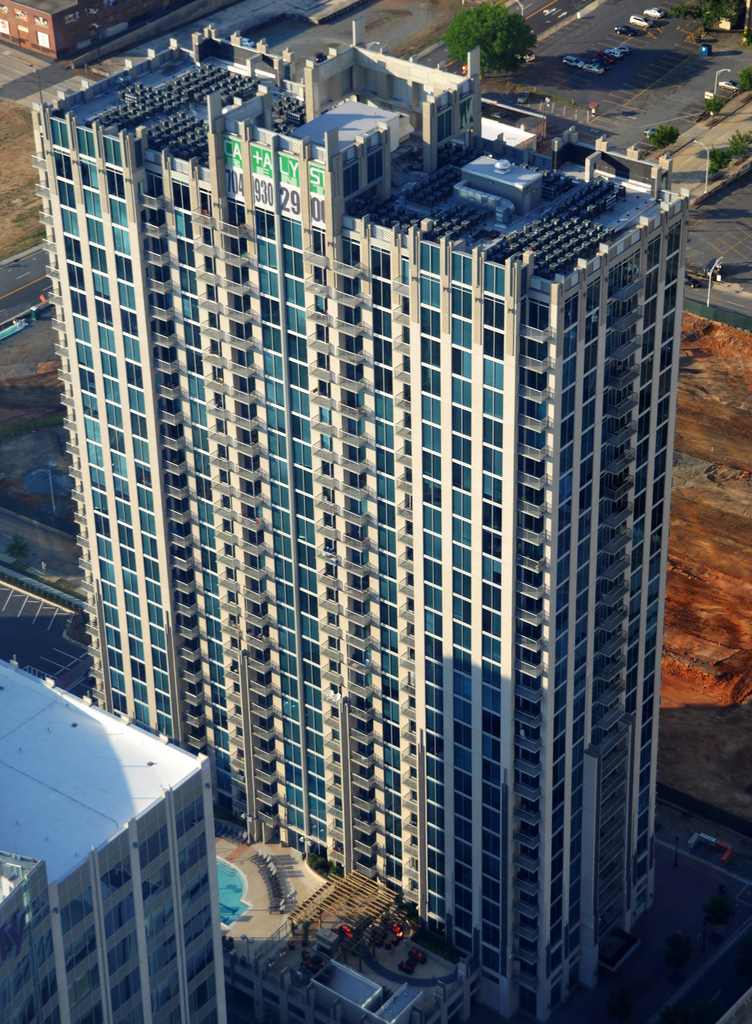
- Catalyst in 2014
- Interactive map of the Catalyst area

General information
- Status: Completed
- Type: Residential
- Location: 255 West Martin Luther King Jr Blvd in Charlotte, North Carolina
- Construction started: 2007
- Opened: 2009
- Owner: John Joyce
- Management: C and J Catalyst

Height
- Antenna spire: 338 feet (103 m)

Technical details
- Floor count: 27
- Lifts/elevators: 3

Design and construction
- Architect: Smallwood, Reynolds, Stewart, Stewart
- Developer: Novare Carolinas Development

Catalyst is a 27-story 462-unit apartment building on West Martin Luther King Jr. Boulevard in Charlotte, North Carolina. The concrete and glass skyscraper in Third Ward, designed by Smallwood, Reynolds, Stewart, Stewart, was built by Atlanta-based Novare Group and completed in 2009.

Tony Skillbeck, president of Novare Carolinas Development, said that the name reflected the building's status as "a literal catalyst for the re-development and the regeneration of Third Ward" as well as the fact that for many residents, this would be their first home purchase, "a catalyst in our buyers' lives."

Groundbreaking took place August 29, 2007. A 15-story, 363,000-square-foot (33,700 m^{2}) office building called 440 South Church was built next door by Trinity Capital Advisors, designed by the same architectural firm. Novare was involved with the office tower, which has Ally Financial as a major tenant. However, Novare was dropped as an operating partner, though keeping its investment, because the company had significant debts that could result in foreclosures, and auditor Deloitte had "substantial doubt about the company’s ability to continue as a going concern." Novare's problems had little effect on the Catalyst project, however.

In February 2009, half the Catalyst units changed from condominiums to apartments due to the decline in the condominium market. As of September 18, 2009, one hundred people lived in the building, and about half the units were leased. As of January 2013, the building is 98% occupied with renters.

Novare managed Catalyst for "an investment fund controlled by affiliates of Lehman Brothers Holdings" with which the developer "restructured its relationship" in Summer 2009. Novare still owned the land and was building a parking lot.

C and J Catalyst bought the Catalyst in 2011 for $103.3 million, or $223,500 per unit. The building was managed by John Joyce.

Catalyst's first floor contains 19,792 SF of retail space and is leased by C and J Catalyst LLC.
