= Ballantyne (Charlotte neighborhood) =

- Edge City / Neighborhood
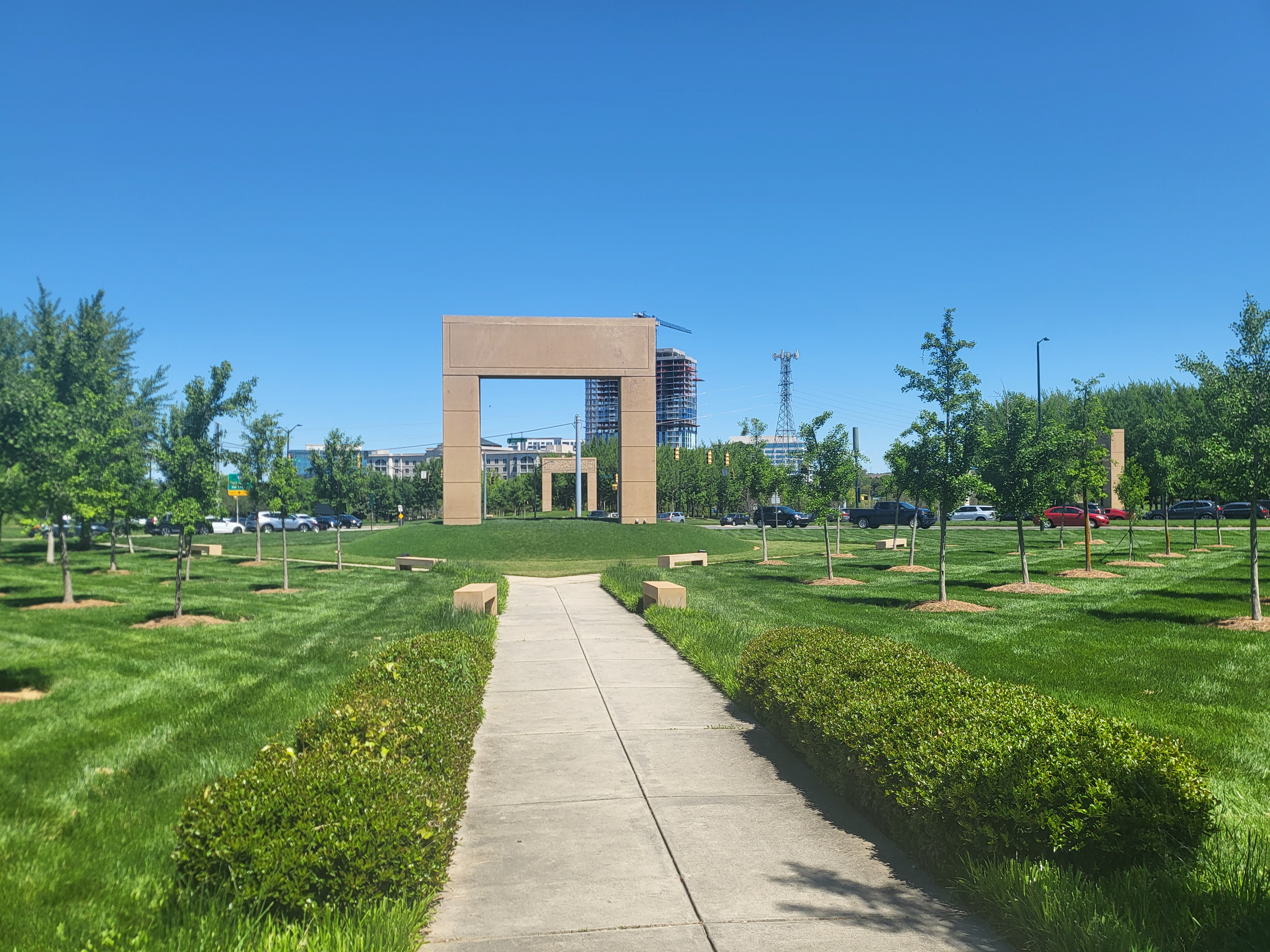
- Ballantyne at the intersection of Johnston Rd and Ballantyne Commons Parkway in April 2024
- Interactive map of Ballantyne
- Coordinates: 35.0547°N 80.8502°W
- Country: United States
- State: North Carolina
- County: Mecklenburg County
- City: Charlotte
- Council District: 7
- Neighborhood Profile Areas: 75, 169, 187, 188, 189, 253, 255, 257, 355, 356
- Founded: 1992
- Annexed: 1999–2003
- Founder: Bissell Companies

Government
  - City Council: Edmund H. Driggs

Area
  - Total: 5,114 acres (2,070 ha)

Population (2016)
  - Total: 70,582
  - Density: 8,833/sq mi (3,410/km^{2})
- Time zone: UTC-5 (EST)
  - Summer (DST): UTC-4 (EDT)
- Zip Code: 28277
- Area codes: 704 and 980

Ballantyne is a neighborhood and developing edge city on the southside of Charlotte, North Carolina, occupying a 2,000-acre (8.1 km^{2}) area of land adjacent to the South Carolina border. The neighborhood is home to St. Matthew Catholic Church.

In June 2013, Wingate University announced that it was moving its Matthews campus to Ballantyne.

== History ==
Ballantyne was originally a large hunting tract owned by the Harris family, descendants of former North Carolina governor Cameron A. Morrison. In 1992, Johnny Harris and his brother-in-law, Smoky Bissell, started Ballantyne Corporate Park, which has become one of the most successful master-planned communities in the United States. Harris had the 2,000 acres rezoned, the largest in Mecklenburg County history. Another developer, Crescent Resources, had already purchased the 610 acres that would later become the Ballantyne Country Club and the accompanying residential development. In October 1995, Bissell bought out his brothers-in-law's shares for $20 million and established Ballantyne, named after his great-aunt. Bissell also developed and designed the Ballantyne Hotel, which opened in September 2001.

At the intersection of Johnston Road and Ballantyne Commons stand four 30-foot monuments representing transportation, technology, finance, and the human spirit of Charlotte. The art installation was commissioned by Yugoslavian artist Boris Tomic, who spent three years crafting them at a brick factory in Salisbury.

=== Proposed secession from Charlotte ===
On April 14, 2012, residents met to discuss an idea of breaking away from the city of Charlotte to form their own city. In the history of North Carolina, this has never been done before. If it is done, the residents will name the new city Providence. However, there is currently a North Carolina community that already carries this name and has its own zip code. Due to a layout that combines a variety of land uses and densities plus a reliance on vehicular journeys, traffic congestion in the area has been a consistent problem.

== Demographics ==
As of 2011, Ballantyne had a population of 20,936. The racial makeup of the neighborhood was 69.2% White American, 11.3% Asian American, 10.3% Black or African American, and 2.5% of some other race. Hispanic or Latino American of any race were 6.7% of the population. The median household income for the area was $96,435.

As of 2020, Ballantyne had a population of approximately 27,342. The racial makeup of the neighborhood was 57% White, 20% Asian, and 10% Black or African American, with residents of other racial groups making up the remaining portion of the population. Hispanic or Latino Americans of any race were 9% of the population. The median household income for the area was approximately $107,578.

As of 2026, current demographic estimates place Ballantyne's population at approximately 27,129 residents. The racial makeup of the neighborhood is estimated to be 55.0% White, 17.3% Asian, 10.6% Black or African American, and 5.0% other races. Hispanic or Latino residents of any race account for approximately 12.1% of the population. The median household income for the area is approximately $125,513. These figures indicate that Ballantyne has become considerably more racially and ethnically diverse than it was in 2011, while also experiencing continued population and economic growth.

== Cityscape ==
=== Ballantyne Corporate Park ===
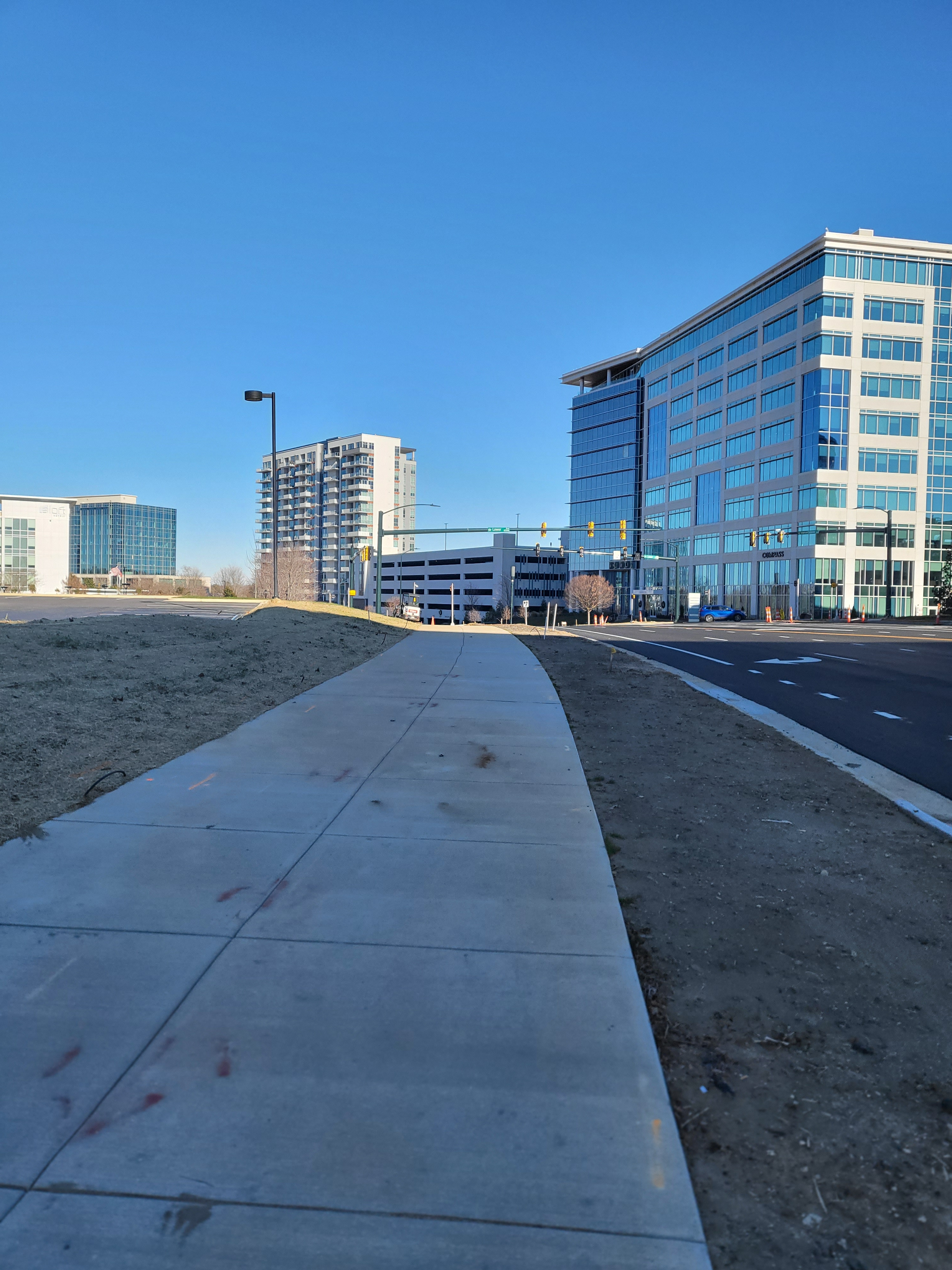
Ballantyne Corporate Park in December 2023

Ballantyne Corporate Park is a 535-acre (217 ha) business park. With over 4,000,000 square feet (370,000 m^{2}) of Class A office space, the business park includes the headquarters of Dentsply Sirona, Babcock & Wilcox, Curtiss-Wright, Snyder's-Lance Inc, Premier Inc, Extended Stay America, Inc, SPX, RXO, and ESPN regional television. Brighthouse Financial, TIAA, and Wells Fargo also have a major corporate presence in Ballantyne.

In 2010, Ballantyne Corporate Park was recognized as International Office Park of the Year by the Building Owners and Managers Association International (BOMA).

In 2017, Northwood Investors purchased the office park to redevelop it into a dense, walkable community, referred to as "Ballantyne Reimagined" from H.C. "Smoky" Bissell, who developed Ballantyne Corporate Park. At $1.2 billion, the sale became the largest transaction in Charlotte real estate history. The deal was also the third largest US office deal in the first half of 2017 according to data collected by Yardi Matrix. The deal was 41 separate transactions totaling $1.2 billion. The transactions ranged in size from the Woodward Building and Gragg Building for $165 million to The Goddard School at 13820 Ballantyne Corporate Place purchased for $1.7 million.

In October 2019, Northwood announced the area's first apartment tower, the 16-story Towerview Ballantyne. The building was part of the early stages of Ballantyne Reimagined.

In March 2021, the Overlook, a 328,000 square feet (30,472 m^{2}) office building opened. Credit Karma leases 95,000 square feet (8,800 m^{2}) in the Overlook building to establish an east coast headquarters in Charlotte.

=== The Bowl at Ballantyne ===
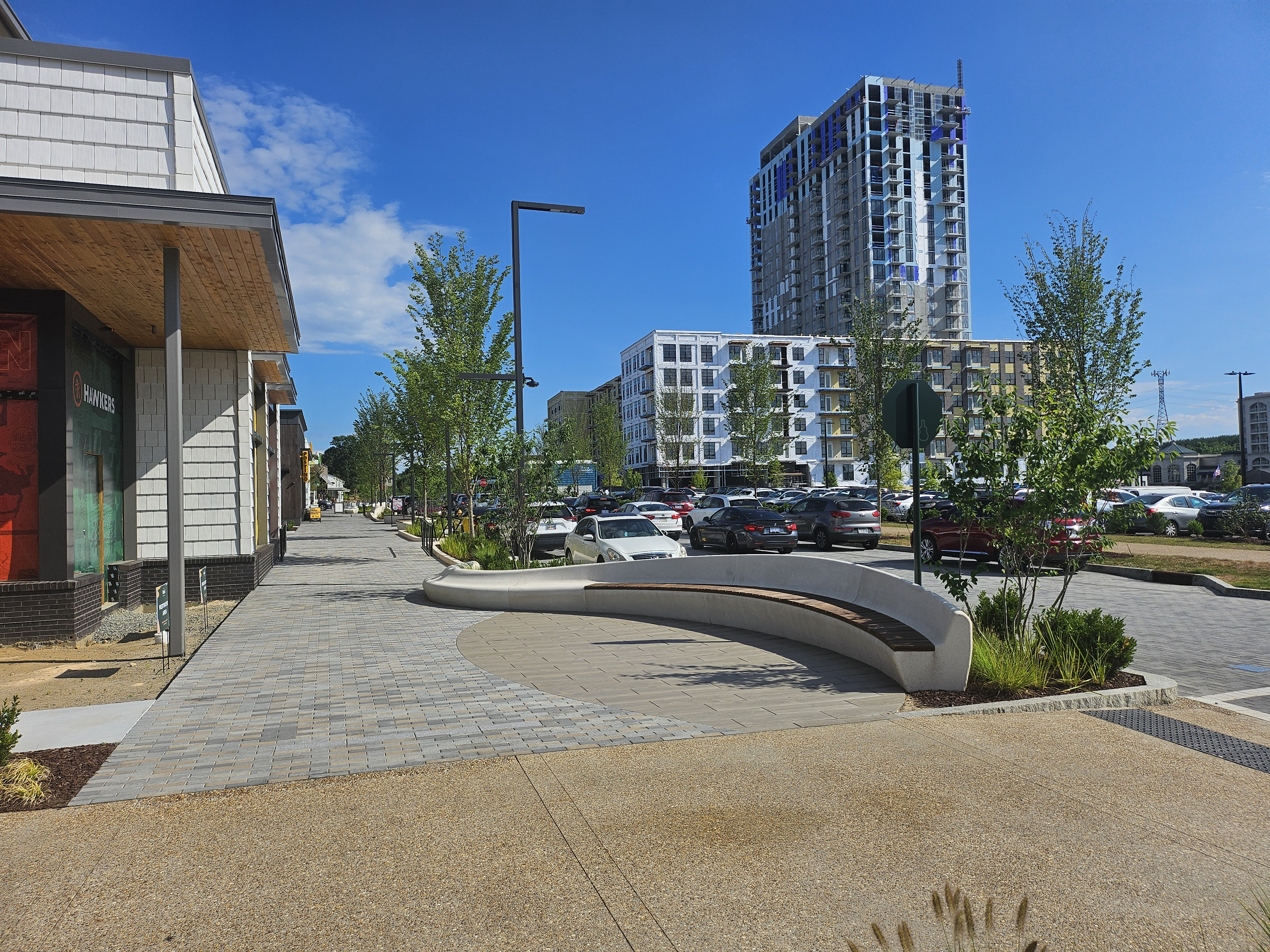
The Bowl at Ballantyne in 2024.

In an effort to transform Ballantyne from a corporate park into a walkable, dense community, Northwood announced plans to construct a 25-acre mixed-use development on the current site of The Golf Club at Ballantyne. Phase I of the development includes 1,200 multifamily units, 300,000 square feet (28,000 m^{2}) of retail, a 3,5000-seat amphitheater, multiple parks, and a greenway. In May 2022 Northwood Investors gave more details about this phase, it will include 70,000 square feet (6,503 m^{2}) of retail space and 350 apartments in a 26-story residential high rise. The retail space will be anchored by Olde Mecklenburg Brewery which will be a, this will be 14,000 square feet (1,300 m^{2}) building with a 7,000 square feet (650 m^{2}) patio. Ballantyne's first brewery. Phase II includes an additional 1,000 multifamily units, 300 townhomes, and 400,000 square feet (37,000 m^{2}) of additional office space.

=== Ballantyne Village ===
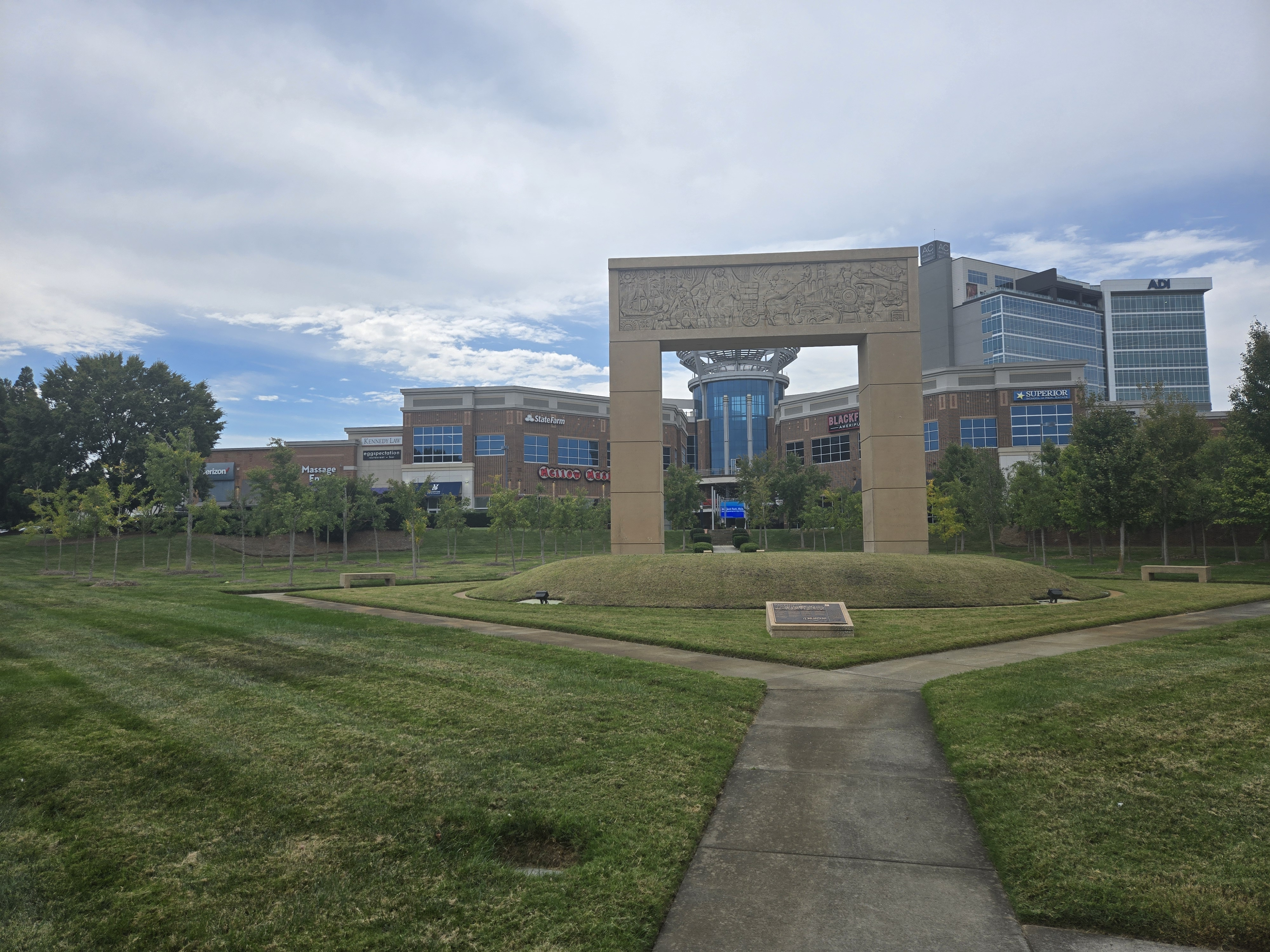
Ballantyne Village in September 2025

Ballantyne Village is a 171,000 square foot mixed used development (excluding the Panorama Tower). It was purchased by American Realty Advisors and Stonemar Properties for $43.2 million in 2017. Previously it was purchased by Charlotte-based Vision Ventures and Mount Vernon Asset Management for $26 million in 2013. It includes a number of restaurants, personal care business, 25,000 square feet of office space with an additional 53,000 square of office being developed in place of the Regal Ballantyne Village that closed in 2020 , and outdoor gathering space. One of the most notable tenants is Blackfinn Ameripub which employees 125 people, occupies 7,500 square feet, and has a popular outdoor seating area. Blackfinn has been a tenant since 2016.

== Panorama Tower ==
In July 2019 Charlotte-based Panorama Holdings broke ground on the Panorama Tower in Ballantyne Village, and it was completed in the second quarter of 2021. It is a 14-story mixed used building. At an estimated height of 182 feet it is one of the tallest buildings in Ballantyne. It includes a 186-room AC Hotel by Marriott and 100,000 square feet of office space, and a rooftop restaurant. Part of the plan for the office space is co working space, which is a part of the office market that Ballantyne that is under represented. The land was acquired in two separate transactions a .6 acre plot and a .5 acre for a combined totaled of $6.7 million paid in 2017. The project has been financed with a $66 million loan through Medalist Capital. Jane Wu, president of Panorama Holdings, said this about the project “Panorama Tower is a first for the Ballantyne area and brings new and exciting urban amenities to one of Charlotte’s top submarkets. Ballantyne already has great office, hotel and dining, so our goal is to offer something unique within each use. It’s rare to see Class A office built over a hotel, and our restaurant will offer views like no other.”

In October 2022 the building signed three new tenants. Panorama Holdings, the project developer will be moving in a 3,500 square feet (325 m^{2}) space. Reinsurer PartnerRe will be leasing 11,130 square feet (1,034 m^{2}). ServisFirst Bank will be leasing 5,500 square feet (511 m^{2}). This is ServisFirst's first Charlotte office, the company's 9 local employees will occupy the space in December 2022. However, the space can accommodate 35 to 40 employees. The bank is currently looking to grow their Charlotte presence by creating a Lake Norman area office and hiring a market president to serve that area. Lee Millian, the new president will start on October 24, 2022.

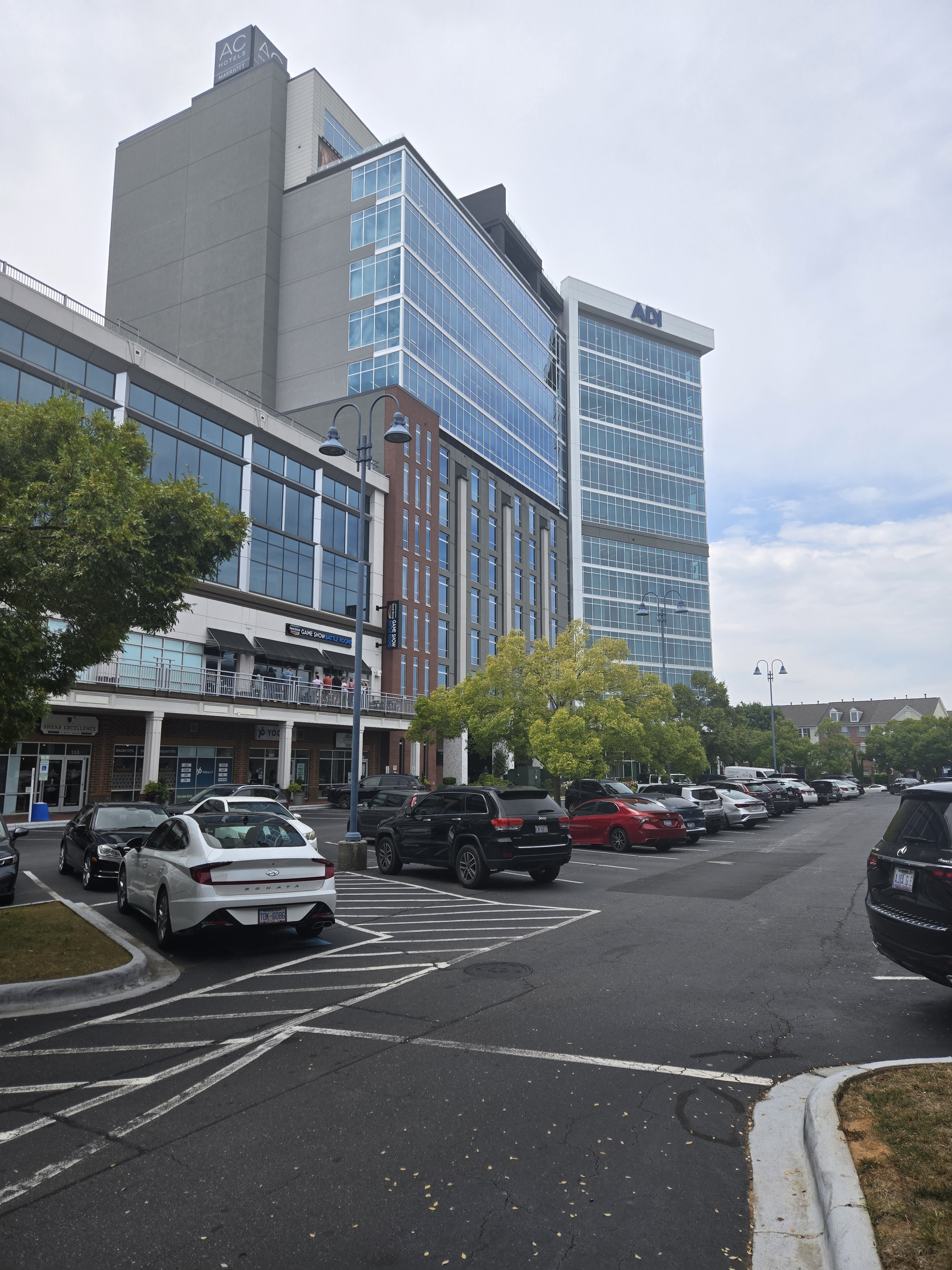
The Panorama Tower in September 2025

== Printed media ==
- Ballantyne magazine

== Notable residents ==
- Allen Iverson, former NBA player, member of Naismith Memorial Basketball Hall of Fame
- Blake Van Leer III film producer, investor, civil rights advocate and celebrity advisor

== See also ==
- List of tallest buildings in Charlotte
- List of Charlotte neighborhoods
- Charlotte metropolitan area
