= First Citizens Plaza =

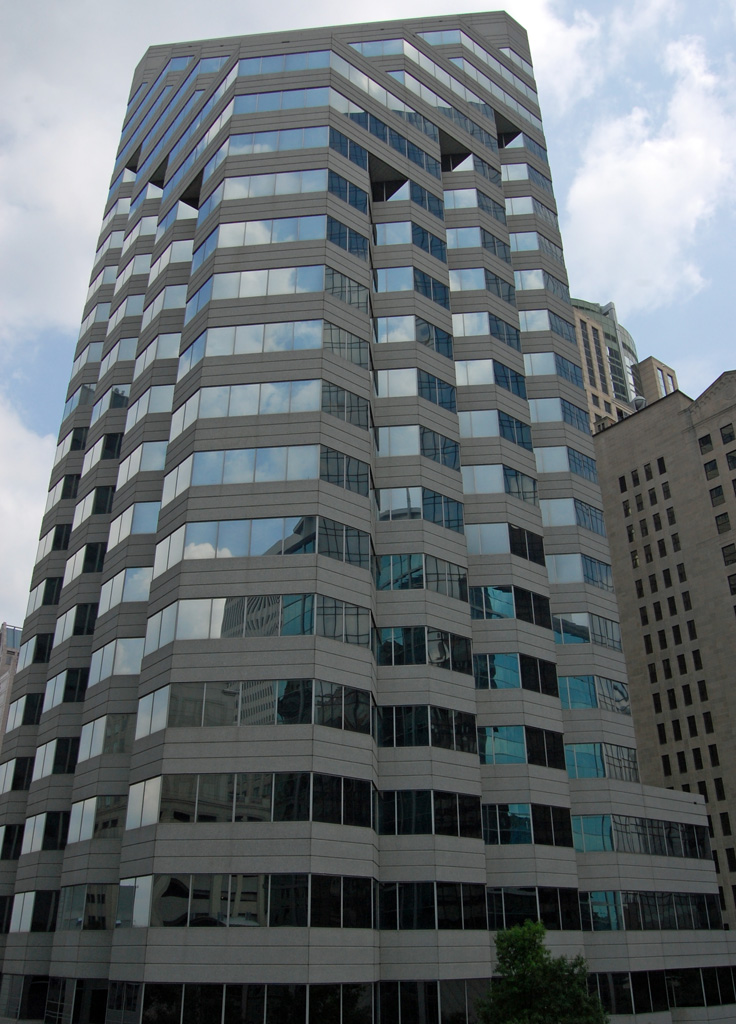
- Interactive map of the First Citizens Plaza area

General information
- Status: Completed
- Coordinates: 35.2268°N 80.8442°W
- Opening: 1985

Height
- Antenna spire: 320 ft (98 m)

Technical details
- Floor count: 23
- Floor area: 476,987 square feet (44,313.5 m^{2})

Other information
- Public transit access: Tryon Street

First Citizens Plaza is a 320 feet (98 m) office high-rise in Charlotte, North Carolina. It was completed in 1985 and has 23 floors.

== See also ==
- List of tallest buildings in Charlotte
