= Hearst Tower =

Hearst Tower may refer to the following buildings in the United States:

- Hearst Tower (Manhattan)
- Hearst Tower (Charlotte)
