= South Tryon Square =

Building complex in Charlotte, NC

201 South Tryon
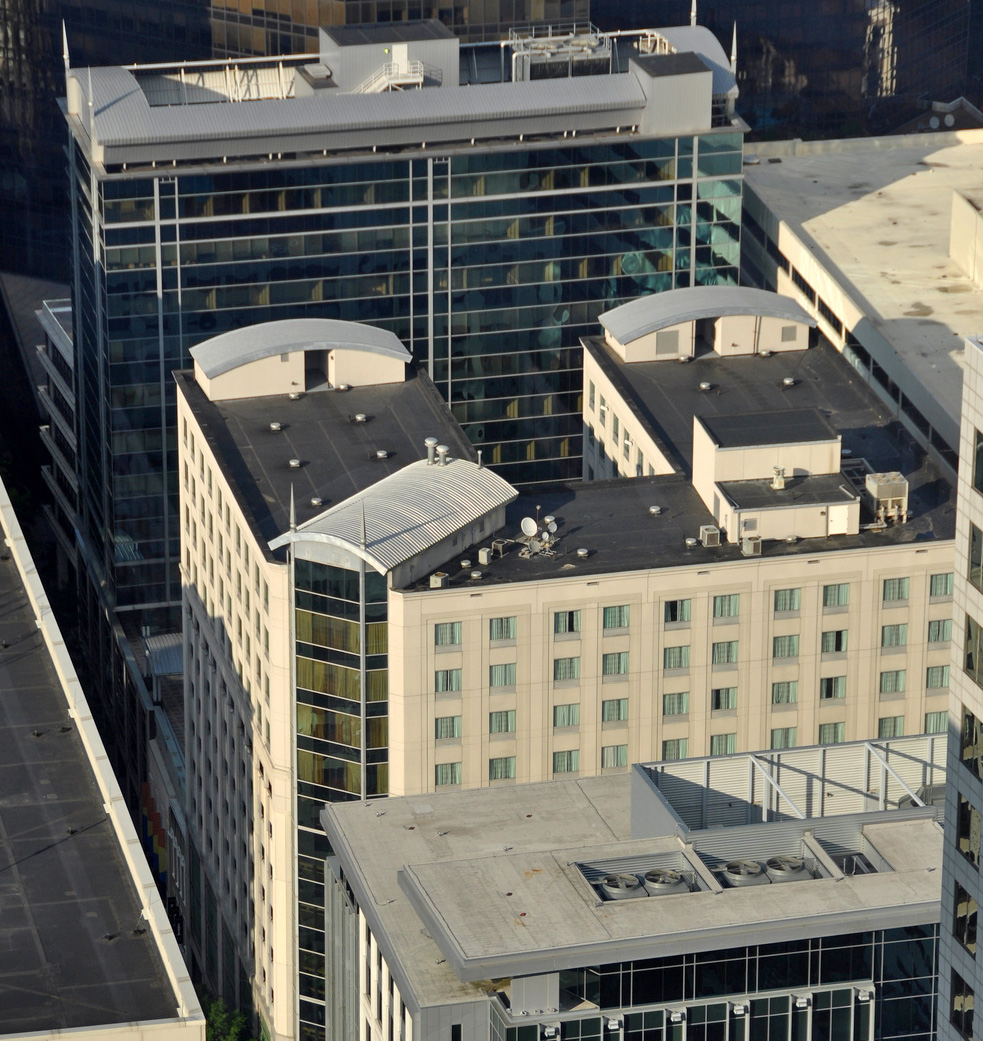
- Interactive map of the 201 South Tryon area

General information
- Type: Office
- Architectural style: Modern
- Location: 201 South Tryon Street; Charlotte, North Carolina, United States
- Coordinates: 35.2260°N 80.8441°W
- Construction started: 1960
- Opened: 1961
- Renovated: 1980, 1999
- Management: Spectrum Properties

Height
- Height: 185.83 feet (57 m)

Technical details
- Floor count: 14
- Floor area: 236,697 sq ft (21,989.9 m^{2})
- Lifts/elevators: 5

Other information
- Public transit access: Tryon Street

Courtyard Charlotte City Center
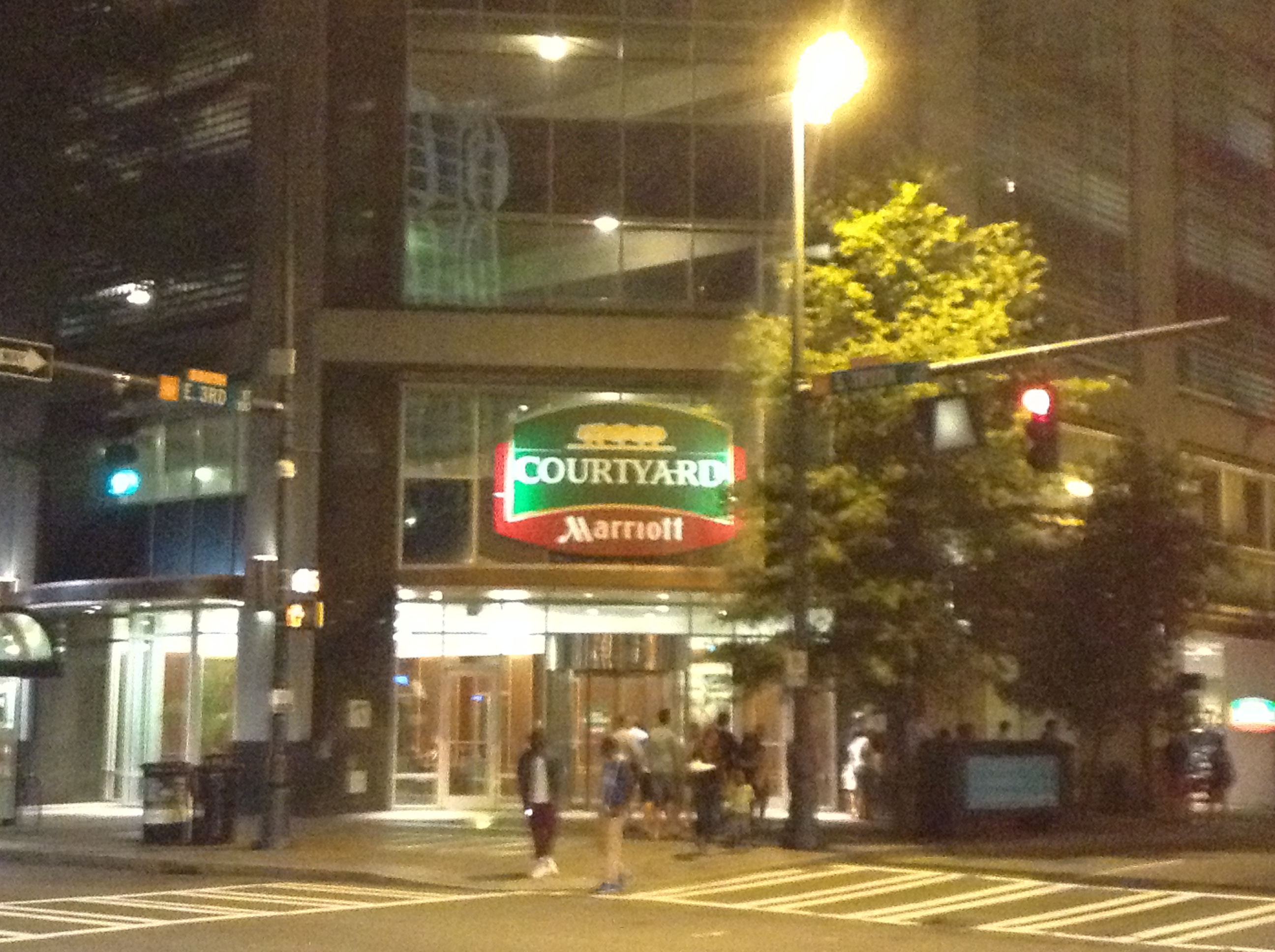
- Interactive map of the Courtyard Charlotte City Center area
- Hotel chain: Courtyard by Marriott

General information
- Type: Hotel
- Architectural style: Postmodern
- Location: 237 South Tryon Street; Charlotte, North Carolina, United States
- Coordinates: 35.2256°N 80.8447°W
- Opened: 2001
- Renovated: 2016
- Management: Spectrum Properties

Height
- Height: 185.83 feet (57 m)

Technical details
- Floor count: 14

Other information
- Number of rooms: 181
- Parking: On site parking garage
- Public transit access: Tryon Street

South Tryon Square is a development consisting of two 14-story high-rises in Charlotte, North Carolina. The first building, at 201 South Tryon, was opened in 1961 as the American Credit Corporation building; from its second renovation, in 1999, the facade was changed to the current gray and green granite with green glass and ornamental metal. The second building, at 237 South Tryon, was opened in 2001 as a hotel branded Courtyard by Marriott and houses the 698-space parking garage. Both buildings are also connected to the neighboring BB&T Center by dual skybridges, as part of the Overstreet Mall.

== History ==
The George Cutter Building and the NCNB Building across the street may have been the state's first Miesian glass and steel skyscrapers. Their design was based on the Lever House skyscraper in New York City.

American Credit Corporation, whose "ACC" logo on top of the building became prominent in Charlotte's skyline, became Barclays American in 1980.

Spectrum Properties renovated the BarclaysAmerican building in the 1990s. Tearing the building down was considered, but developers added a new exterior.

At the time the building was sold for $68.5 million to a pension fund for the city of Detroit in 2006, major tenants included Wachovia, Dean & DeLuca, and a Marriott Courtyard hotel. Spectrum continued to manage the building.
