= Smallwood, Reynolds, Stewart, Stewart =

Architectural firm

Smallwood
- Type: Private
- Founded: 1979
- Headquarters: Atlanta, Georgia, U.S.
- Area served: Worldwide
- Services: Architecture; Master Planning; Experiential Graphic Design; Interior Design; Landscape Architecture
- Website: www.smallwood-us.com

Smallwood is an American architectural firm based in Atlanta, Georgia. Established in 1979, the company has approximately 108 total employees across all of its locations and generates $25.00 million in sales (USD). There are 2 companies in the Smallwood, Reynolds, Stewart, Stewart & Associates, Inc. corporate family; with the Atlanta office serving the United States and international clients with an additional office in Singapore. Its Atlanta office is headed by eleven principal architects, many of whom are members of the American Institute of Architects (AIA) and are Leadership in Energy and Environmental Design (LEED) Certified Professionals. The firm has worked on designs in corporate, commercial, hospitality, multifamily, industrial, governmental, and educational settings.

== Notable projects ==
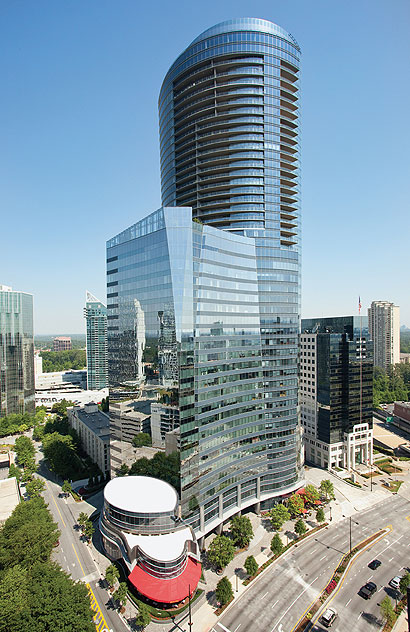
3344 Peachtree is 50 stories tall, making it the tallest structure in Buckhead and the tallest to be built in Atlanta since 1992.

- 3344 Peachtree, Atlanta, 2006
- Truist Center, Charlotte, North Carolina 2002
- 1100 Peachtree, Atlanta, 1990
- Resurgens Plaza, Atlanta, 1988
- RBC Gateway, Minneapolis, 2021
- Atlanta Financial Center, Atlanta, 1982
- Lincoln Financial Building, Greensboro, North Carolina, 1990
- Fifth Third Center, Charlotte, North Carolina, 1997
- Frisco Station, Texas, Frisco, Texas, 2019

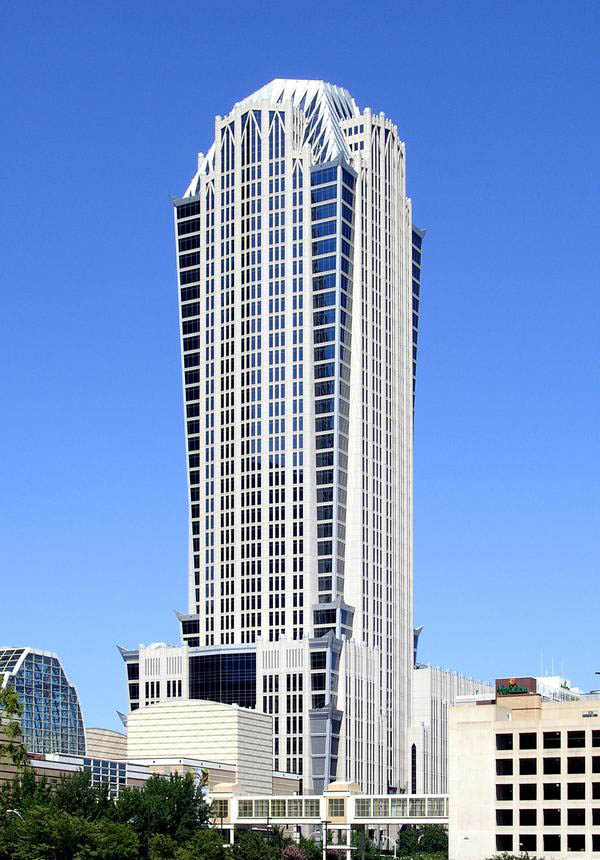
Hearst Tower, Charlotte, North Carolina

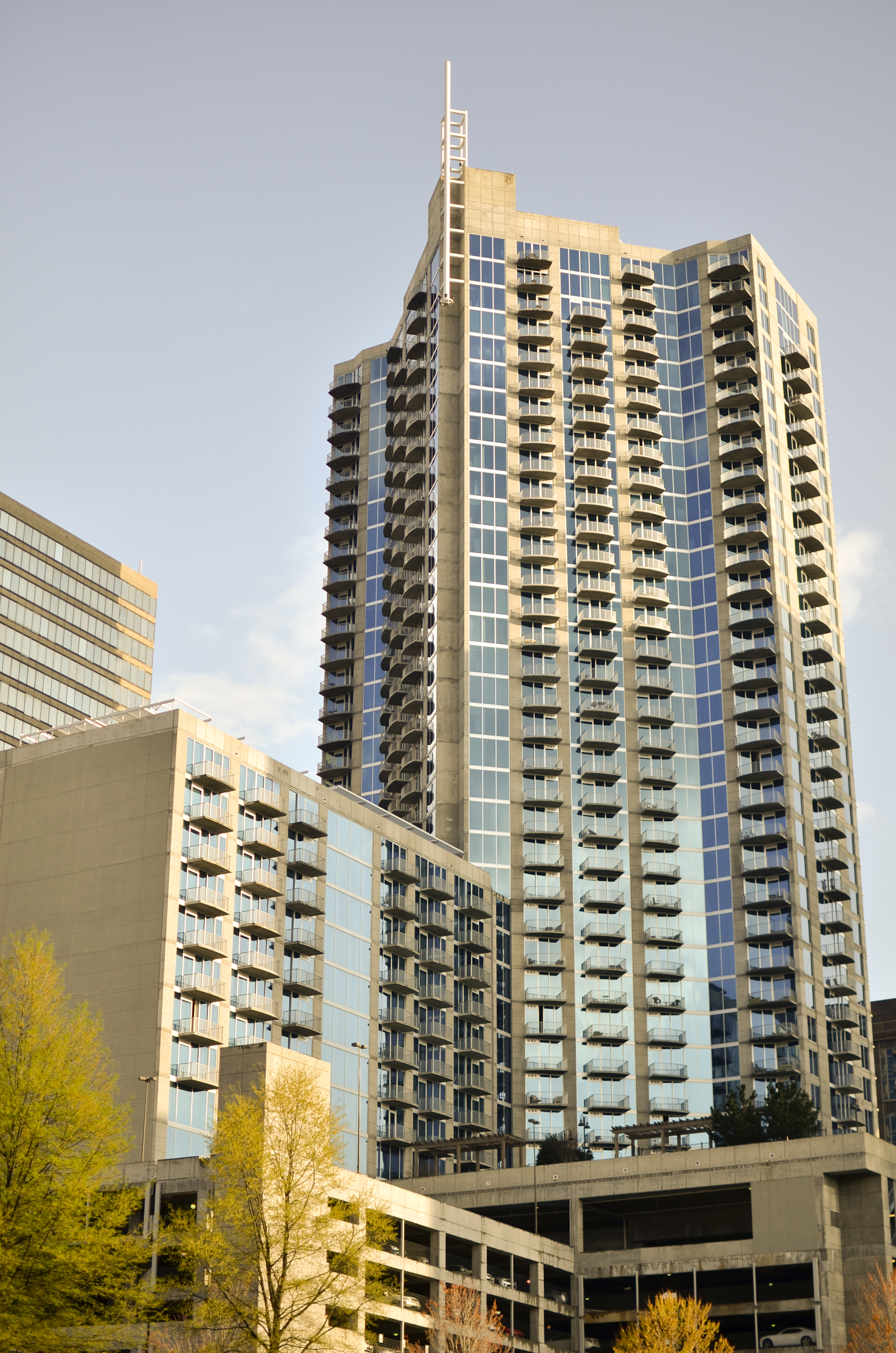
TWELVE Centennial Park, Atlanta, Georgia

- TWELVE Centennial Park, Atlanta, 2007
- Avenue, Charlotte, 2007
- The Atlantic
- Capital Plaza, Abu Dhabi, UAE, 2011
- Signature Tower Jakarta, Jakarta, 2021
- Icon Buckhead, Atlanta, 2019
- Cay Building, Savannah, 2012

== Recognition ==
- Ranked 26 in the 2019 Interior Design Magazine 100 Rising Giants
- Ranked 83 in the 2021 Interior Design Magazine Top 100 Giants
- Ranked 439 in 2020 ENR Top 500 Design Firms
- Ranked 76 in 2020 ENR Top 100 Green Design Firms
- 2020 ENR Top 500 Sourcebook
  - Ranked 18 – Top 20 Design Firms for Hotels, Motels, and Convention Centers
  - Ranked 17 – Top 20 Design Firms for Mixed-Use Developments
- Ranked 7 in Atlanta Business Chronicle Top 25 Architectural Design Firms 2019
- Ranked 6 in Atlanta Business Chronicle Top 25 Interior Design Firms 2019
- Ranked 58 in 2020 Building Design + Construction Giants Top 155 Architecture Firms
