= 201 North Tryon (Charlotte, North Carolina) =

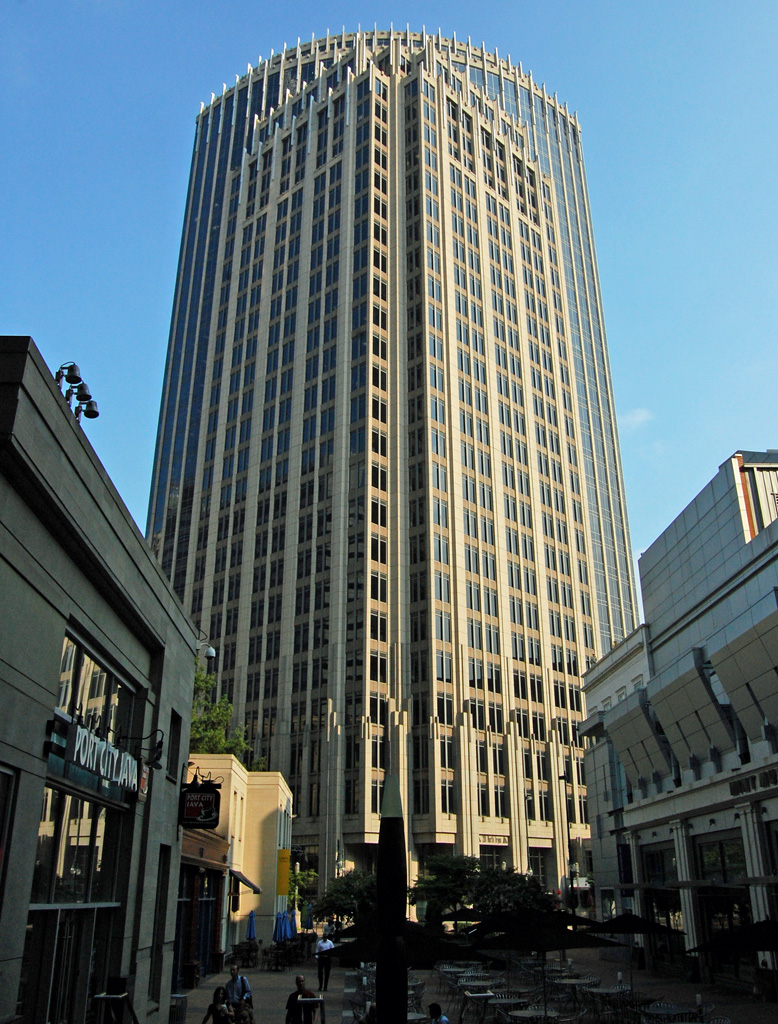
- Interactive map of the 201 North Tryon area

General information
- Type: Office
- Location: 201 North Tryon Street Charlotte, North Carolina
- Coordinates: 35.2285°N 80.8419°W
- Completed: 1997
- Owner: Cousin's Properties

Height
- Antenna spire: 447 feet (136 m)

Technical details
- Floor count: 30
- Floor area: 697,817 square feet (64,829.3 m^{2})

Design and construction
- Architects: Smallwood, Reynolds, Stewart, Stewart & Associates, Inc.
- Developer: Trammell Crow Co.

Other information
- Public transit: Tryon Street

201 North Tryon, formally known as the IJL Financial Center and Fifth Third Center, is a 447 feet (136 m) high rise office building in Charlotte, North Carolina. It was completed in 1997, and has 30 floors. It is located at the intersection of West Fifth Street and North Tryon Street. It was designed by Smallwood, Reynolds, Stewart, Stewart & Associates. The building contains 697,817 square feet (65,000 m^{2}) of rentable floor space and it includes an attached 1,030 space parking deck. In 2001 the building won the BOMA International's TOBY award for excellence in office building management and operations.

== History ==
The building was developed by Trammel Crow Co. for the former NationsBank now Bank of America. After Interstate/Johnson Lane signed on as a tenant the bank agreed to give them naming rights which gave the tower the name IJL Financial Center. In the spring of 1998 260 Interstate/Johnson Lane employees moved into the building to occupy their new headquarters. The company had leased the first five floors for a total of 105,000 square feet (9,800 m^{2}). They moved from their previous headquarters at 121 West Trade, at that time called the Interstate Tower. Other original tenants of the building included MCI leasing 24,000 square feet (2,200 m^{2}), Carousel Capital with 6,000 square feet (560 m^{2}), law firm Smith Helms Mulliss & Moore leased 85,000 square feet (7,900 m^{2}), and Landcraft Properties occupying 2,700 square feet (250 m^{2}). The building had three restaurants The Capital Grill (opened in spring 1998), CoCo Pazzo (opened in the summer of 1998), and Leo's Delicatessen (opened in the spring of 1998) across 15,000 square feet (1,400 m^{2}). In November 1997 it was announced that Bank of America would occupy 350,000 square feet (33,000 m^{2}) in the building. In December 1997 the first NationsBank employees moved into the building, the bank space had increased to 400,000 square feet (37,000 m^{2}). Additional employees moved in during the spring of 1998.

In October 1998 Wachovia purchased Interstate/Johnson Lane Inc. for $230 million. In February 2002 Wachovia announced it would lease five floors in the building for a total of 110,000 square feet (10,000 m^{2}). On March 10, 2010, Fifth Third Bank announced that 201 North Tryon will be the North Carolina headquarters for the bank; renaming it to Fifth Third Center. Previously the building was known as IJL Financial Center. The signage on the building was replaced in May 2010. Fifth Third began to occupy the building in June 2010. They moved their 250 local employees into space that spanned three floors. At the time they moved into the space Bob James, bank president for North Carolina, said that they only had room for 10 additional employees. At that time there was an option to lease a fourth floor. Their previous Charlotte office was in University Research Park. The bank first entered the Charlotte market with their 2008 acquisition of First Charter Corp. First Charter had occupied a small amount of space in the building.

In July 2012 Real estate investment firm Parmenter Realty Partners purchased the building from Bank of America for $163 million, which came out to $240 per square foot. This price per square foot was similar to other recent transactions in Charlotte. In June 2012 Parkway properties paid for $257 per square foot for Truist Center formerly Hearst Tower for a total of $250 million and also in June an Israeli real estate firm purchased One Wells Fargo Center for $249 per square foot for a total of $245 million. At the time of the purchase the building was 99% leased. This sale was part of a broader effort by Bank of America to sell the building along with Truist Center formerly Hearst Tower. The bank leased back space in both buildings.

In November 2013 Winstead, a Texas-based law firm signed a lease for 20,000 square feet (2,000 m^{2}) to house its 40 local employees. In March 2014 law firm McGuireWoods renewed their lease of 150,000 square feet (14,000 m^{2}) across 7 floors. The firm is the third largest tenant after Bank of America and Fifth Third. In March 2015 HFF Inc. signed a lease for 6,000 square feet.

In June 2014 Cousins Properties purchased the building for $215 million, which equals $308 pers square foot. This transaction set the record for the highest price per square foot for an office building. The previous record was from 2007 when the Carillon building was purchased for $140 million, with a price of $298 per square foot.

In November 2019 Fifth Third expanded their space in the tower to 100,300 square feet (9,000 m^{2}). The expansion of space at that time was 25,000 square feet (2,000 m^{2}), an additional floor. Tenant Dimensional Fund Advisors vacated two floors earlier in 2019, which they occupied starting in 2015, to occupy its newly built East Coast headquarters in South End. In 2019 Fifth Third had 500 employees based in the Charlotte area with plans to add an additional 300 in the coming years. Even with Fifth Third's expansion Bank of America remained the largest tenant with 318,000 square feet (30,000 m^{2}).

In May 2024 Bank of America announced plans to exit the building in July 2025. Their current space is 316,751 square feet (29,000 m^{2}), which equals 46% of the building's current occupancy. As of May 2024, the building was 92% occupied, this will drop to 53% once the bank leaves. In August 2025 the building's owner, Cousins Properties, announced the building will be undergoing a multimillion-dollar renovation. The building is being rebranded as 201 North Tryon, the exterior facade, and first two floors will be redone. At the time of the announcement the building's occupancy was below 50%.

== See also ==
- List of tallest buildings in Charlotte
- List of tallest buildings in North Carolina
