= Mint Street station =

Streetcar station in Charlotte

Mint Street
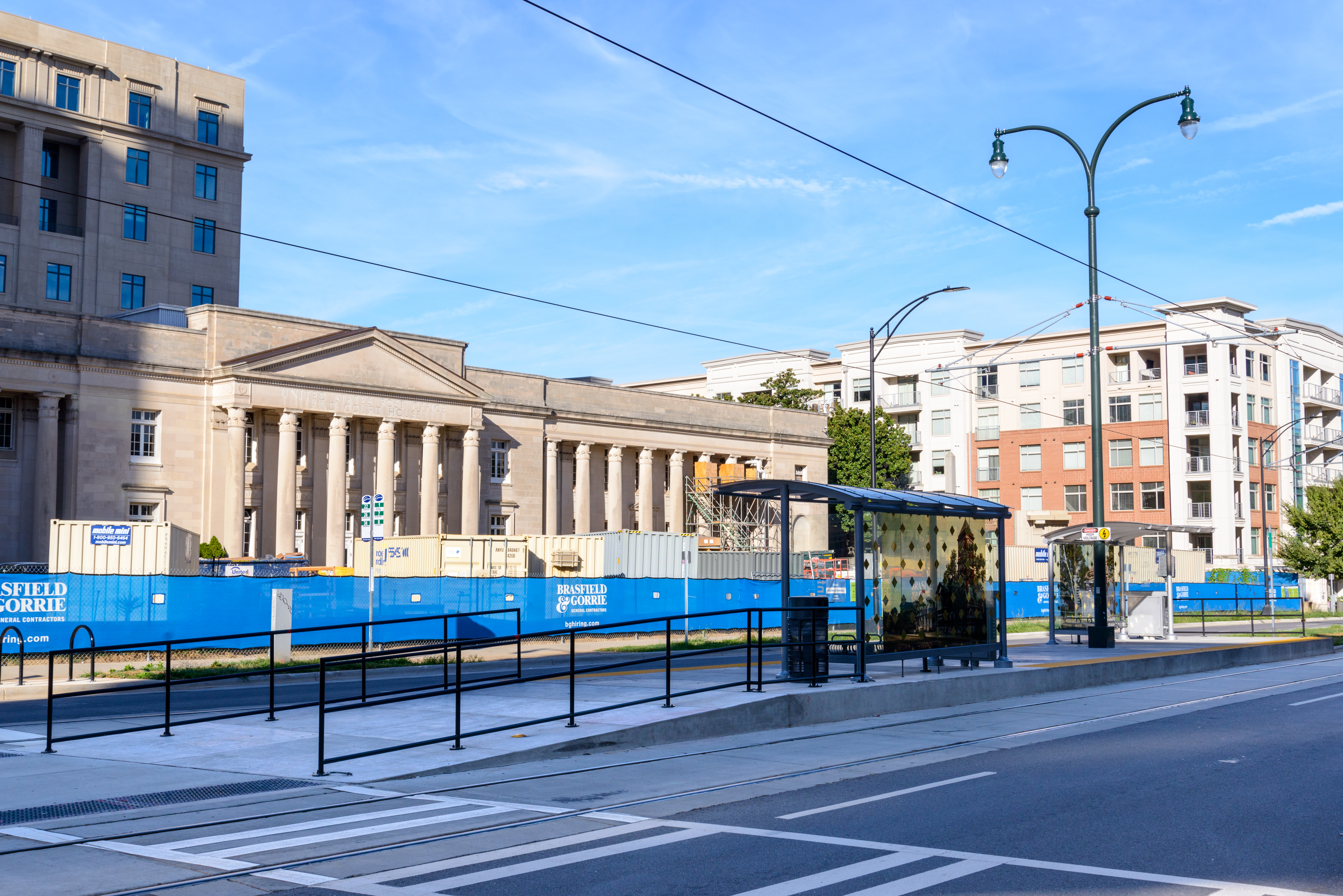
- Streetcar stop along West Trade Street

General information
- Location: 419 West Trade Street; Charlotte, North Carolina; United States
- Coordinates: 35.22967°N 80.84593°W
- Owner: Charlotte Area Transit System
- Platforms: 1 island platform
- Tracks: 2

Construction
- Structure type: At-grade
- Cycle facilities: Bicycle racks
- Accessible: yes

History
- Opened: August 30, 2021

Services
Preceding station	CATS	Following station
Charlotte Gateway Station toward French Street	CityLynx Gold Line	Tryon Street toward Sunnyside Avenue
Location

Mint Street is a streetcar station in Charlotte, North Carolina. The at-grade island platform on West Trade Street is a stop along the CityLynx Gold Line, serving the Charles R. Jonas Federal Building as well as several commercial and residential towers.

== Location ==
Mint Street station is located at the intersection of West Trade and Mint Streets, in Uptown Charlotte. In the immediate is the Charles R. Jonas Federal Building, TradeMark, Carillon Tower and the Vue; while nearby is Romare Bearden Park, Truist Field, and Old Settlers' Cemetery.

== History ==
Mint Street station was approved as a Gold Line Phase 2 stop in 2013, with construction beginning in Fall 2016. Though it was slated to open in early-2020, various delays pushed out the opening till mid-2021. The station opened to the public on August 30, 2021.

== Station layout ==
The station consists of an island platform with two passenger shelters; a crosswalk and ramp provide platform access from West Trade Street. The station's passenger shelters house two art installations by Jim Hirschfield and Sonya Ishii.
