= The Vue =

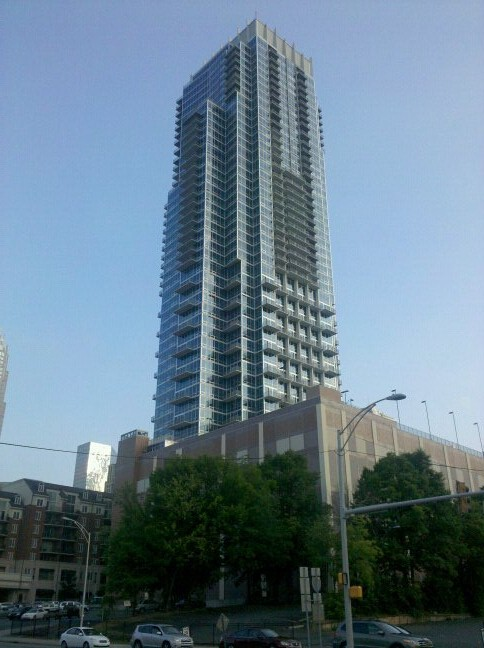
- Interactive map of the The Vue area

General information
- Status: Completed
- Type: Single-use residential
- Location: Corner of 5th and Pine Streets in the Fourth Ward
- Coordinates: 35°13′51.6″N 80°50′41.3″W
- Construction started: 2007
- Opening: Fall 2010
- Cost: $275 million
- Owner: Northwood Ravin
- Management: Northwood Ravin

Height
- Roof: 576 feet (176 m)

Technical details
- Floor count: 51 (no 13th floor; top floor will be 51st)
- Lifts/elevators: 4

Design and construction
- Architect: Lamar Johnson Collaborative
- Developer: MCL Companies
- Structural engineer: Fisher and Partners
- Main contractor: J. E. Dunn Construction Group (formerly RJ Griffin & Co.)

Website
- www.vuecharlotte.com

The VUE or The VUE Charlotte is a 576-foot (176 m) tall skyscraper in Charlotte, North Carolina. It was completed in 2010 and has 51 stories. A luxury apartment tower, the VUE is the tallest residential building in the state. The leasing center for The Vue is located at the corner of 5th Street and W. Pine.

With 402 units, residences range from studios to penthouses. Some contain private balconies, gourmet kitchens, spa inspired bathrooms, and floor to ceiling glass. The VUE features a 35,000 sq ft (3,300 m^{2}) amenity deck with a heated Jr. Olympic-sized pool, tennis–sport court, pet park, and landscaped courtyard with outdoor kitchen. Other amenities include a 24-hour full service concierge, business center, and 50th floor SKY Lounge. The name "VUE" is an acronym for "Vertical Urban Experience".

The VUE is located in the historic Fourth Ward residential Uptown Charlotte neighborhood. Neighboring sites of interest include Bank of America Stadium, BB&T Ballpark, Romare Bearden Park, Spectrum Center, Blumenthal Performing Arts Center, museum row and many restaurants and bars.

== History ==
The VUE was originally developed by three developers MCL Cos. of Chicago, Churchill Development Group of Orlando, and Westminster Partners of Lake Forest, Ill. However, in September 2007 MCL purchased the sole rights to the project during the building's construction. It broke ground at the 1.5-acre site in June 2007. It was originally composed of 403 condos with studios starting at $200,000 and penthouses up to $4 million.

Work temporarily stopped on the project on September 1, 2009, due to a legal dispute between R.J. Griffin & Co., the general contractor, and MCL Cos. because of the developer's failure to pay invoices. Work resumed on October 5, 2009. At the time that half of the condos were under contract and expected to be completed within a year. In order to restart work MCL Cos reached a deal to borrow $4 million from R.J. Griffin & Co. Also, MCL reached a new lending agreement using international investors including Cairn Financial Products Limited and Goldman Sachs International. This agreement extended the load until February 2011. MCL defaulted on the two loans totaling $194.8 million on February 22, 2011. The property was auctioned off on June 12, 2011. It was purchased by Northwood Investors for $100 million.

At the time of foreclosure only 19 units had been closed on. At one time 167 units were under contract for a total value of $82.55 million. However, this amount still would not have covered the loan. At a 25% discounted price the sale of all units would have grossed $187.79 million, which still would not have covered the loans. In June 2012 Northwood Ravin announced that the 391 unsold condos would be converted into apartments. The apartments range in size from studios to three-bedroom penthouses. The initial rent range was $1,300 to $5,000. When the conversion was announced Northwood Ravin received a lot of interest in viewing the property.

Northwood Ravin spent $20 million converting the building into a luxury apartment tower. The changes to the building included reworking the Pine Street entrance, adding two outdoor kitchens, and adding dining areas to the eighth floor deck. The most notably addition was the 3,800 square-foot SkyLounge bar on the 50th floor. The bar is only open to residents and their guests. Some of its features include a piano bar, game room, four televisions, and a wireless business center.

== See also ==
- List of tallest buildings in Charlotte
- Uptown Charlotte
- Charlotte
- TradeMark
- List of tallest buildings in North Carolina
