= 200 South Tryon =

Coordinates: 35°13′35″N 80°50′41″W

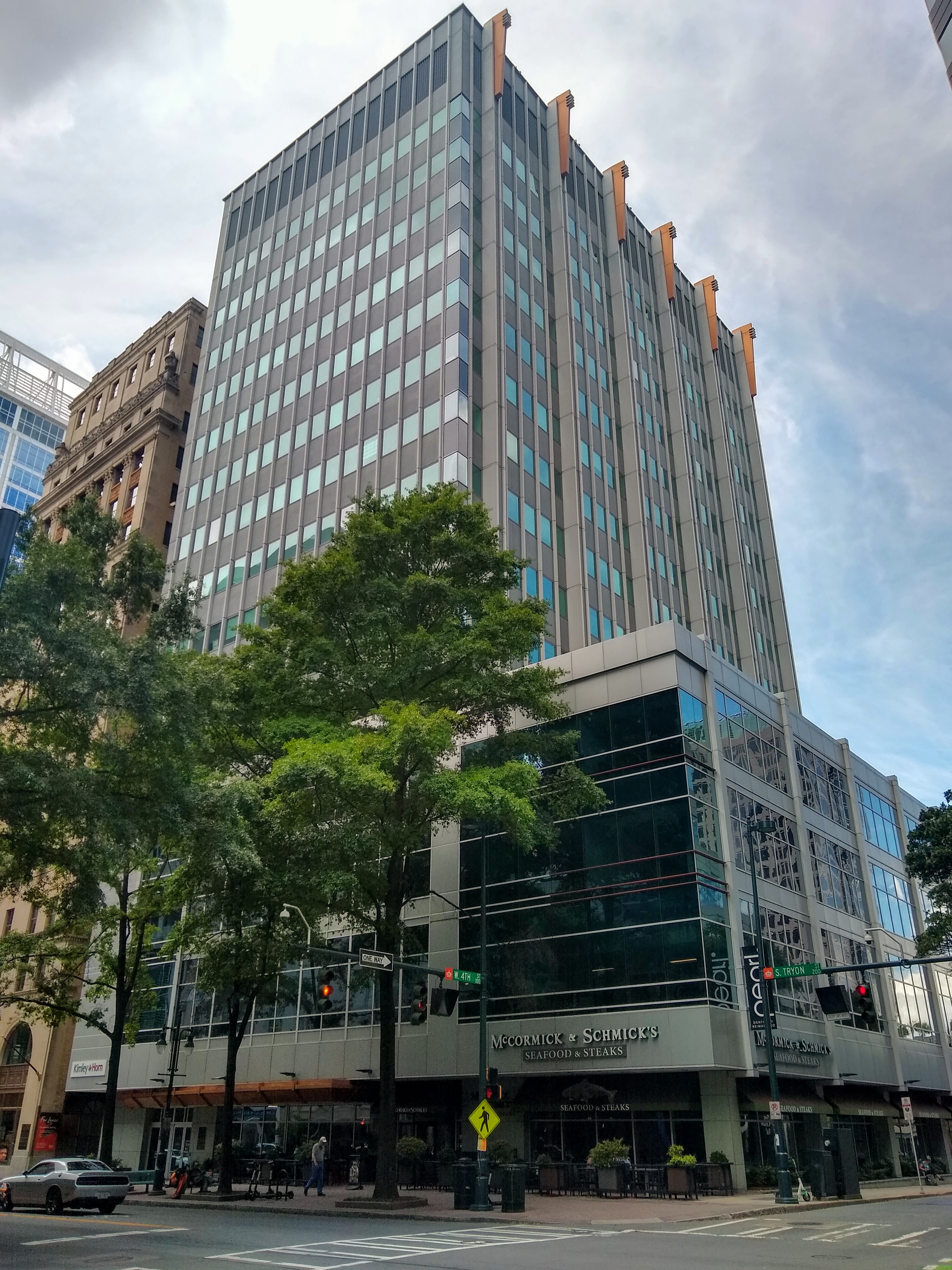
- Interactive map of the 200 South Tryon area

General information
- Status: Completed
- Type: Office
- Opening: 1961
- Owner: Hines

Height
- Antenna spire: 299 ft (91 m)

Technical details
- Floor count: 18

Design and construction
- Architects: Walter Hook Associates, Inc.

Other information
- Public transit access: Tryon Street

200 South Tryon is a 299 feet (91 m) tall high-rise in Charlotte, North Carolina. It was completed in 1961 and has 18 floors. It is the 19th tallest building in the city. Gerald D. Hines Interests purchased what was then called the BB&T Building in December 1998 and began a renovation process that added another floor which was completed in 2001. and in the process was upgraded to contain all Class B office space.

When completed as the NCNB Building, the building stood as the first glass high-rise in North Carolina. The NCNB Building and the George Cutter Building across the street may have been the state's first Miesian glass and steel skyscrapers. Both buildings were based on the Lever House building in New York City.

The Commercial National Bank Building, completed in 1912 and 12 stories tall, once stood on the site.

== See also ==
- List of tallest buildings in Charlotte

Preceded by 112 Tryon Plaza	Tallest Building in Charlotte; 1961—1971; 91 m	Succeeded by Jefferson First Union Tower
