= 7th Street station (Charlotte) =

Light rail station in Charlotte, North Carolina

7th Street
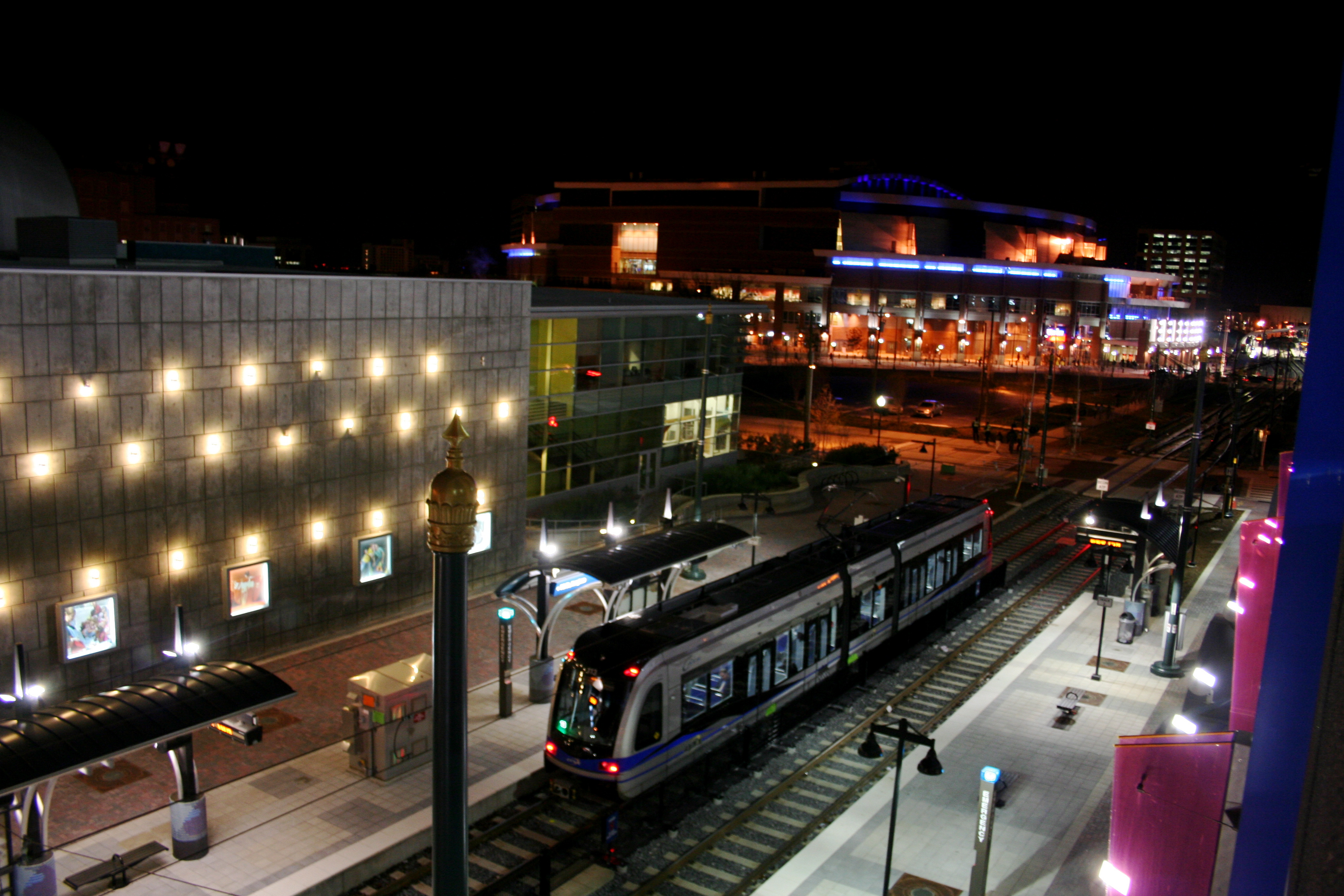

General information
- Location: 260 East Seventh Street; Charlotte, North Carolina; United States
- Coordinates: 35°13′38″N 80°50′17″W
- Owner: Charlotte Area Transit System
- Platforms: 2 side platforms
- Tracks: 2
- Connections: Uptown CycleLink

Construction
- Structure type: At-grade
- Cycle facilities: Bicycle racks
- Accessible: yes
- Architect: Ralph Whitehead Associates
- Architectural style: Modern

History
- Opened: June 28, 2004
- Rebuilt: November 24, 2007
- Former names: 6th Street

Services
Preceding station	CATS	Following station
Charlotte Transportation Center toward I-485/South Boulevard	Lynx Blue Line	9th Street toward UNC Charlotte–Main
Former services
Preceding station	CATS	Following station
Charlotte Transportation Center/Arena toward Atherton Mill	Charlotte Trolley	9th Street Terminus
Location

7th Street station is a light rail station for the LYNX Blue Line in Center City Charlotte, North Carolina, United States. It is located between 6th and 7th Streets; several privately operated parking decks and lots surround the station. Notable places nearby include Discovery Place, Hearst Tower, ImaginOn, Levine Museum of the New South, Main Public Library and the McGlohon Theatre at Spirit Square.

== History ==
The station, originally known as 6th Street, first opened for service on June 28, 2004, for the historic Charlotte Trolley, with one track and one platform, located north adjacent to Bland Street. Originally with one track active and one platform, it operated for a little over 19 months, before closing on February 6, 2006, to be reconstructed for the LYNX Blue Line. To put some distance from the new CTC/Arena Station, the newly renamed 7th Street Station was moved further north onto adjacent 7th Street. The original side platform and structure, located at the southeast corner of 6th Street, was razed; Center City Green, a parking deck, is located at the former location. During the early planning phase of the Blue Line, in February 2002, it was decided that 7th Street would be the northern terminus of the line, while 9th Street would continue to be the northern terminus for the Charlotte Trolley. The station officially reopened for service on Saturday, November 24, 2007, and as part of its opening celebration fares were not collected. Regular service with fare collection commenced on Monday, November 26, 2007. By 2017, the side platforms were lengthened, extending towards 6th Street, which will allow three-car trains at the station.

The station served as the Blue Line's northern terminus until the extension to UNC Charlotte opened on March 16, 2018.

== Public art ==
As part of the CATS Art in Transit program, 7th Street features several pieces intended to provide a better overall aesthetic for the station. The works include bas-reliefs entitled Gingko by Alice Adams, drinking fountain basins designed to look like dogwoods, the North Carolina state flower, by Nancy Blum, river stone benches by Hoss Haley and finishes on the track fencing, shelter windscreens and column cladding featuring a leaf motif of species of tree found in the station by Shaun Cassidy.
