= TWELVE Centennial Park =

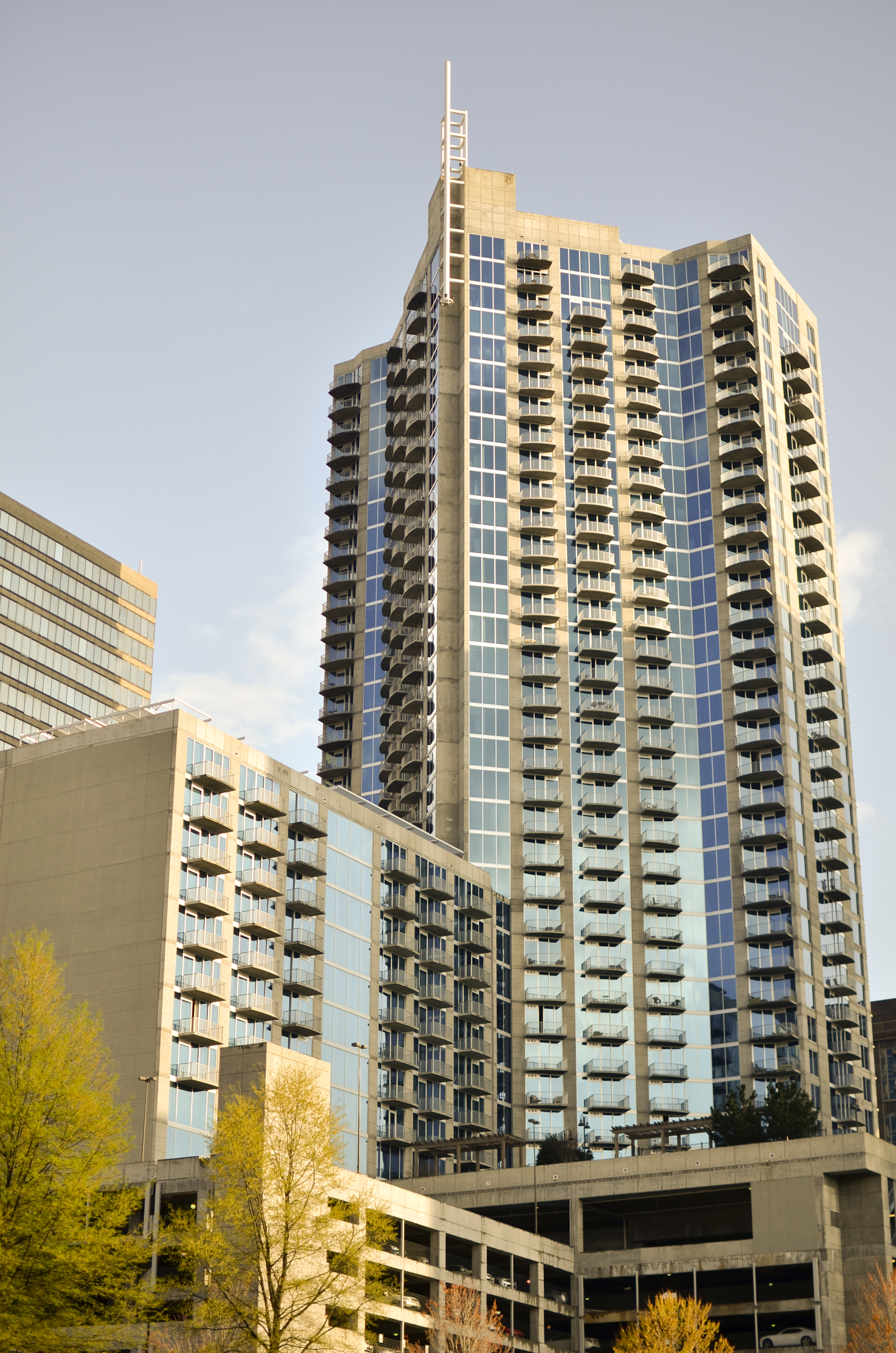
- TWELVE Centennial Park

- Location within Atlanta

General information
- Status: Completed
- Type: Highrise Condominium
- Location: 400 West Peachtree St NW. Atlanta, GA 30308
- Coordinates: 33°45′55″N 84°23′16″W
- Construction started: October 31, 2005
- Completed: 2007
- Cost: US $88M

Height
- Roof: 468 feet (143 m)
- Top floor: 40

Technical details
- Floor count: 39
- Lifts/elevators: 11

Design and construction
- Architect: Smallwood, Reynolds, Stewart, Stewart
- Developer: Novare Group
- Structural engineer: Barnes Group Inc.

TWELVE Centennial Park is a mixed-use complex located in Downtown Atlanta. The project plans consist of two residential highrise towers of 39 stories each and one mid-rise hotel.

== Planning ==
The combined residential towers would contain 1,024 condominium units while the hotel consists of 102 rooms. There is 20,000 sq ft (2,000 m^{2}) of retail space and 5,000 sq ft (500 m^{2}) of restaurant space. Due to the Great Recession, only one of the two residential towers was completed in 2007. The site of the other tower remains open and prepared for future construction.

The TWELVE Centennial Park is one of the tallest residential luxury high-rises in the Atlanta area.

== See also ==
- List of tallest buildings in Atlanta
