= Capital Plaza =

- Interactive map of the Capital Plaza area

General information
- Type: Mixed-use
- Location: Abu Dhabi, United Arab Emirates
- Coordinates: 24.4989°N 54.3677°E
- Construction started: 2004
- Completed: 2011
- Cost: 170 million euros ($179,732,500.00)
- Management: REISCO

Height
- Roof: 689 ft (210 m)

Technical details
- Floor count: 51; 39; 39; 34; 32
- Floor area: 2,690,977.6 sq ft (250,000.00 m^{2})

Design and construction
- Architects: Smallwood, Reynolds, Stewart, Stewart; Architect of Record National Consulting Office for engineering (NCO)
- Developer: Real Estate Investment & Services Company
- Structural engineer: Meinhardt Group
- Main contractor: Arabian Construction Company

Capital Plaza is a building complex with five high-rise buildings in Abu Dhabi, United Arab Emirates. Capital Plaza is located directly on the Corniche of Abu Dhabi and includes three residential towers, an office tower and a hotel tower.

The property was developed by Reisco; the facility management of the building complex has been carried out by Dussmann Middle East GmbH, a subsidiary of the German Dussmann Group. There are 247 apartments (towers A, B, C) in the building. The hotel tower houses the 283-room Sofitel Abu Dhabi Corniche, which opened in March 2012. The base of the building complex includes the hotel lobby, restaurants and a few shops.

The office tower includes the Middle East's first double-deck elevator with a destination control system.

== Buildings ==
- Residential tower A: 39 floors, height 173 meters
- Residential tower B: 45 floors, height 210 meters
- Residential tower C: 39 floors, height 173 meters
- Hotel tower: 37 floors, height 166 meters
- Office tower: 34 floors, height 200 meters

== See also ==
- List of tallest buildings in Abu Dhabi
