= Carillon Tower =

Skyscraper in Charlotte, North Carolina, US

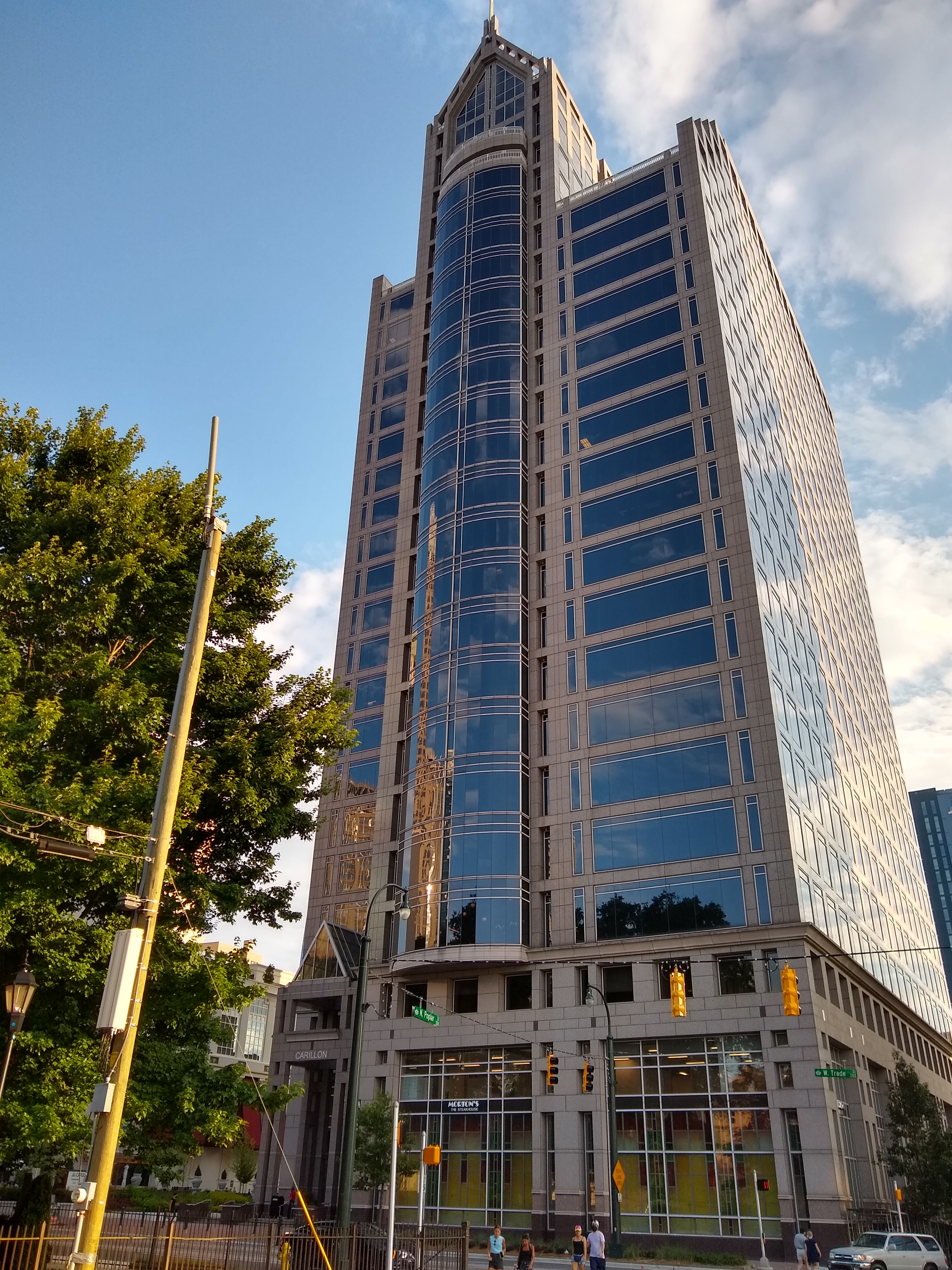
- Interactive map of the Carillon Tower area

General information
- Status: Completed
- Type: Office
- Location: 227 West Trade Street, Charlotte, North Carolina, US
- Coordinates: 35.2286°N 80.8451°W
- Opening: 1991
- Owner: Hines Interests

Height
- Antenna spire: 394 feet (120 m)

Technical details
- Floor count: 24
- Floor area: 486,994 square feet (45,243.2 m^{2})

Design and construction
- Architects: Thompson, Ventulett, Stainback & Associates

Other information
- Public transit access: Mint Street

The Carillon Tower is a 394-foot-tall (120 m) high-rise in Charlotte, North Carolina, United States. The building was completed in 1991 and it has 24 floors. The top of the high-rise contains a copper-roofed, Gothic central spire shaped like a bell tower, which rises 300 feet (91 m) from the base of the building. This structure is considered to be the most striking feature of the property, and it was designed to resemble the architecture of the historic First Presbyterian Church located across the street. The same church also inspired the building's name. An art gallery is located in the lobby of the building hosts a program of rotating exhibitions, including artist Jean Tinguely's Cascade, a 40-foot (12 m) mobile suspended above an indoor fountain. A landscaped public plaza is situated at the entrance of Carillon on West Trade Street. It surrounds a 30-foot (9 m) high multi-colored aluminum sculpture, designed by Jerry Peart, named The Garden. It has 470,726 square feet (43,732 m^{2}) of Class A office space. This building was built on the former site of the Hotel Charlotte. In 2007, it was sold for $140 million (equivalent to $217 million in 2025) to Hines.

== See also ==
- List of tallest buildings in Charlotte
- List of tallest buildings in North Carolina
