= 121 West Trade =

Skyscraper in Charlotte, North Carolina

Coordinates: 35°13′39″N 80°50′38″W

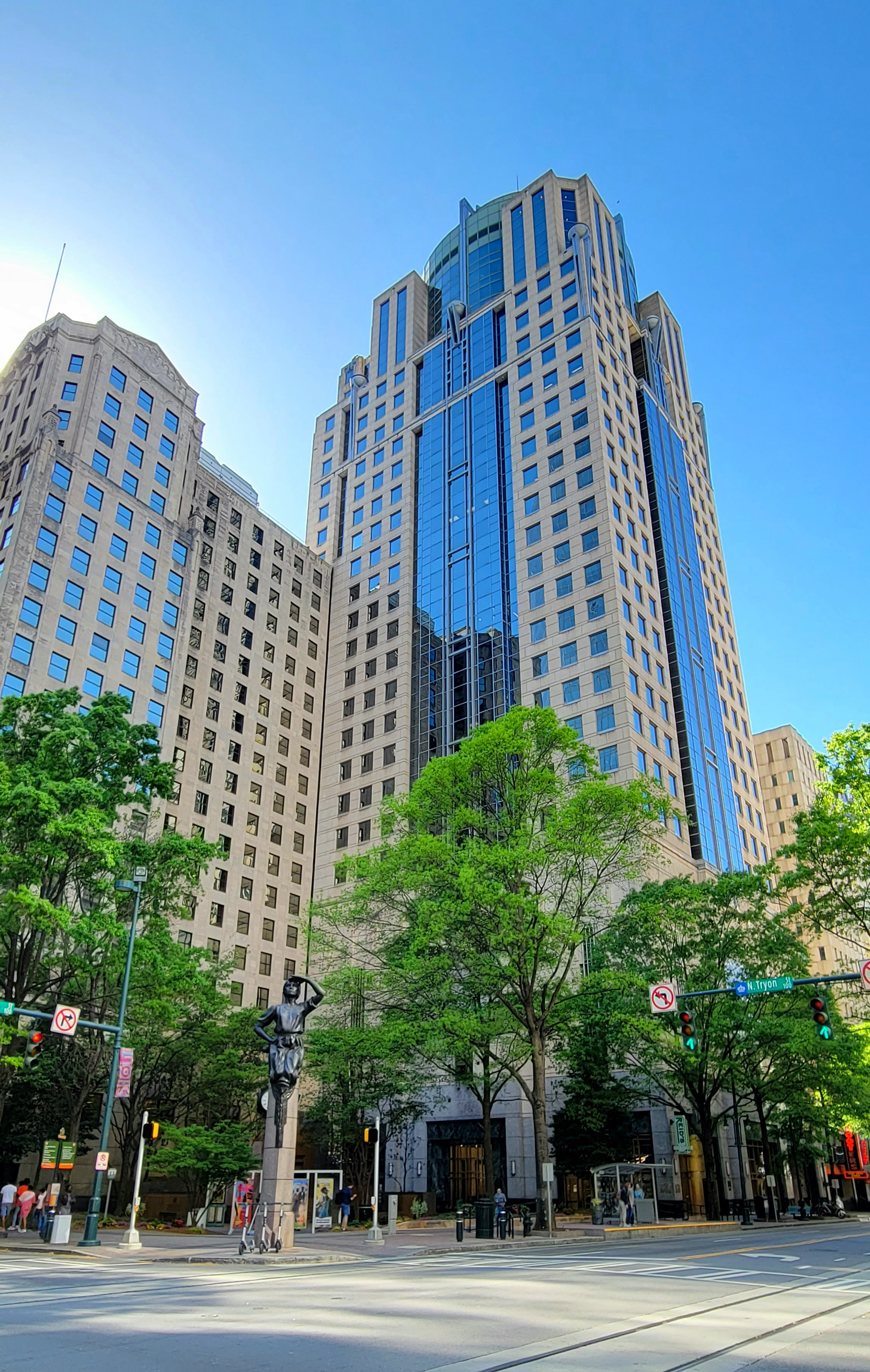
- Interactive map of the 121 West Trade area

General information
- Status: Completed
- Type: Office
- Location: 121 West Trade Street, Charlotte, North Carolina, United States
- Opening: 1990

Height
- Antenna spire: 462 ft (141 m)

Technical details
- Floor count: 32
- Lifts/elevators: 10

Design and construction
- Architect: Kohn Pedersen Fox Associates
- Developer: Faison & Associates

Other information
- Public transit: Tryon Street

121 West Trade (formerly known as the Interstate Tower) is an office high rise located at the Trade and Tryon, in Charlotte Center City, North Carolina, United States. The post modern building was designed by Kohn Pedersen Fox Associates and was completed in 1991. It also has 330,000 feet (101,000 m) of Class A office space.

== See also ==
- List of tallest buildings in Charlotte
- List of tallest buildings in North Carolina
