= First Presbyterian Church (Charlotte, North Carolina) =

Historic church in North Carolina, US

- U.S. National Register of Historic Places
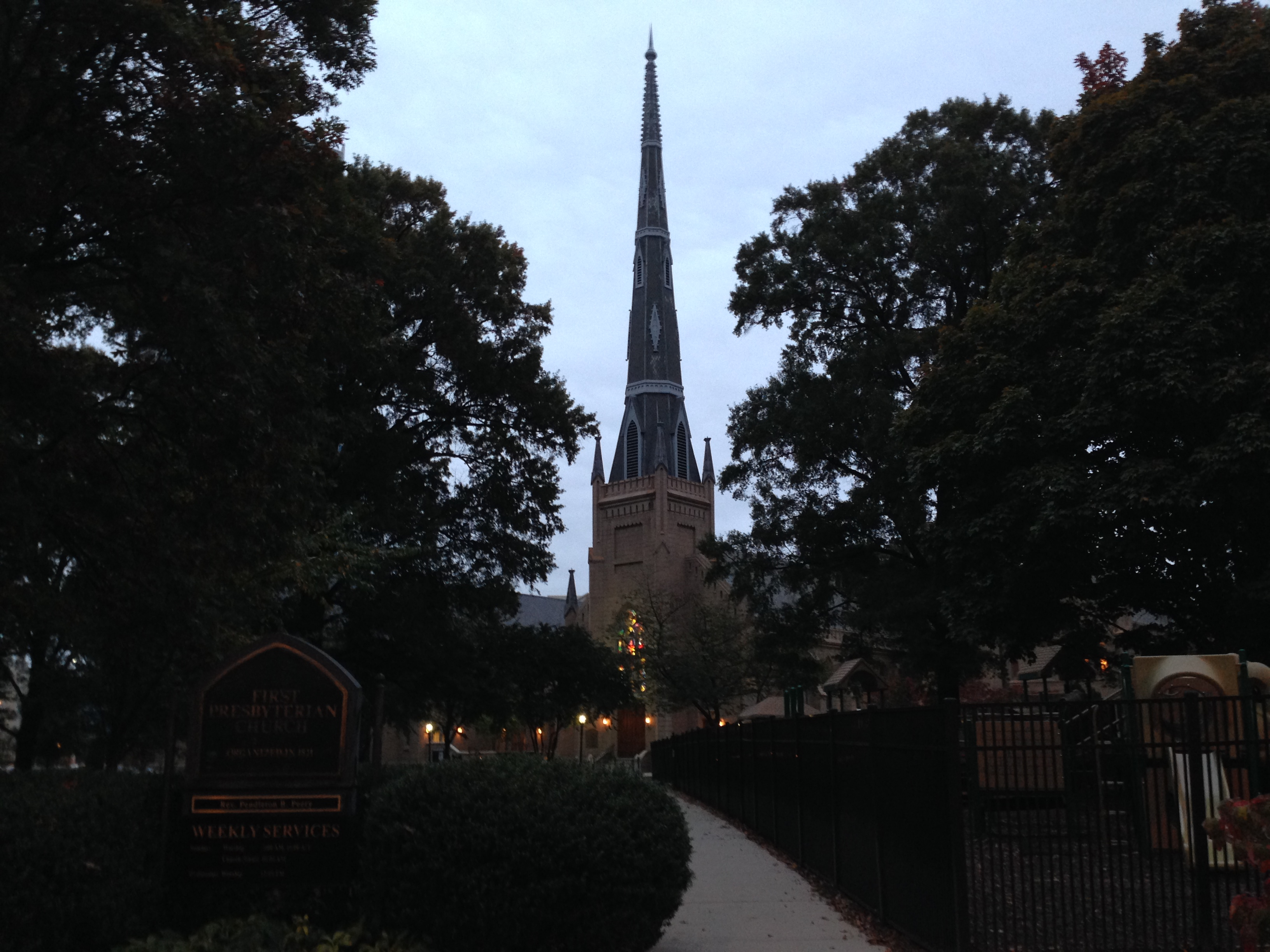
- First Presbyterian Church, November 2013

- Location within North Carolina Location within the United States
- Location: 200 W. Trade St., Charlotte, North Carolina
- Coordinates: 35°13′44″N 80°50′38″W
- Area: 3.2 acres (1.3 ha)
- Built: 1857
- Architect: Reading, Sidney
- Architectural style: Gothic Revival
- NRHP reference No.: 82001300
- Added to NRHP: November 12, 1982

First Presbyterian Church is a historic Presbyterian church located at 200 W. Trade Street in Charlotte, Mecklenburg County, North Carolina. It was built in 1857, and is a one-story, Gothic Revival style stuccoed brick building. The original spire was rebuilt in 1883-1884 and the side and rear walls of the church were taken down and a new structure was erected in 1894–1895.

It was added to the National Register of Historic Places in 1982.
