= Romare Bearden Park =

Public park in Charlotte, North Carolina

- Interactive map of Romare Bearden Park
- Type: Urban park
- Location: Charlotte, North Carolina
- Coordinates: 35.2270°N 80.8473°W
- Area: 5.4 acres (2.2 ha)
- Created: 2013
- Designer: Norie Sato
- Etymology: Romare Bearden
- Owner: Mecklenburg County
- Operator: Mecklenburg County Parks and Recreation
- Public transit: Mint Street
- Website: Romare Bearden Park

Romare Bearden Park is a 5.4-acre public park located at 300 S. Church Street in Charlotte, North Carolina. Named for Charlotte born artist Romare Bearden, it opened in late August 2013. It is across the street from Truist Field, the home of the International League's Charlotte Knights.

Located in Uptown Charlotte, the park offers fitness and cultural arts programs throughout the year. The park design is based on Bearden’s collages and paintings as interpreted by supervising artist Norie Sato. It features two gardens, a courtyard of dining tables with chairs on a bed of crushed granite, a formal event green field, a play area with interactive digital chimes including dance chimes, and several waterfalls.

The grand opening took place on August 31-September 1, 2013.

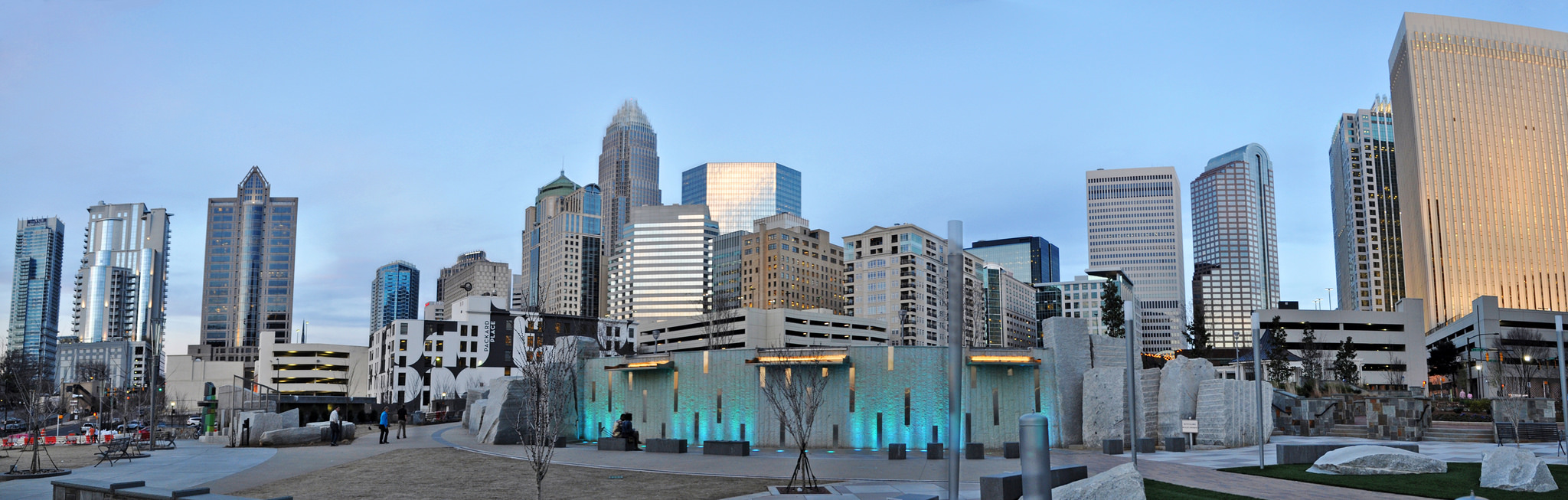
Panorama of Romare Bearden Park
