= Tryon Street station =

Streetcar station in Charlotte

Tryon Street
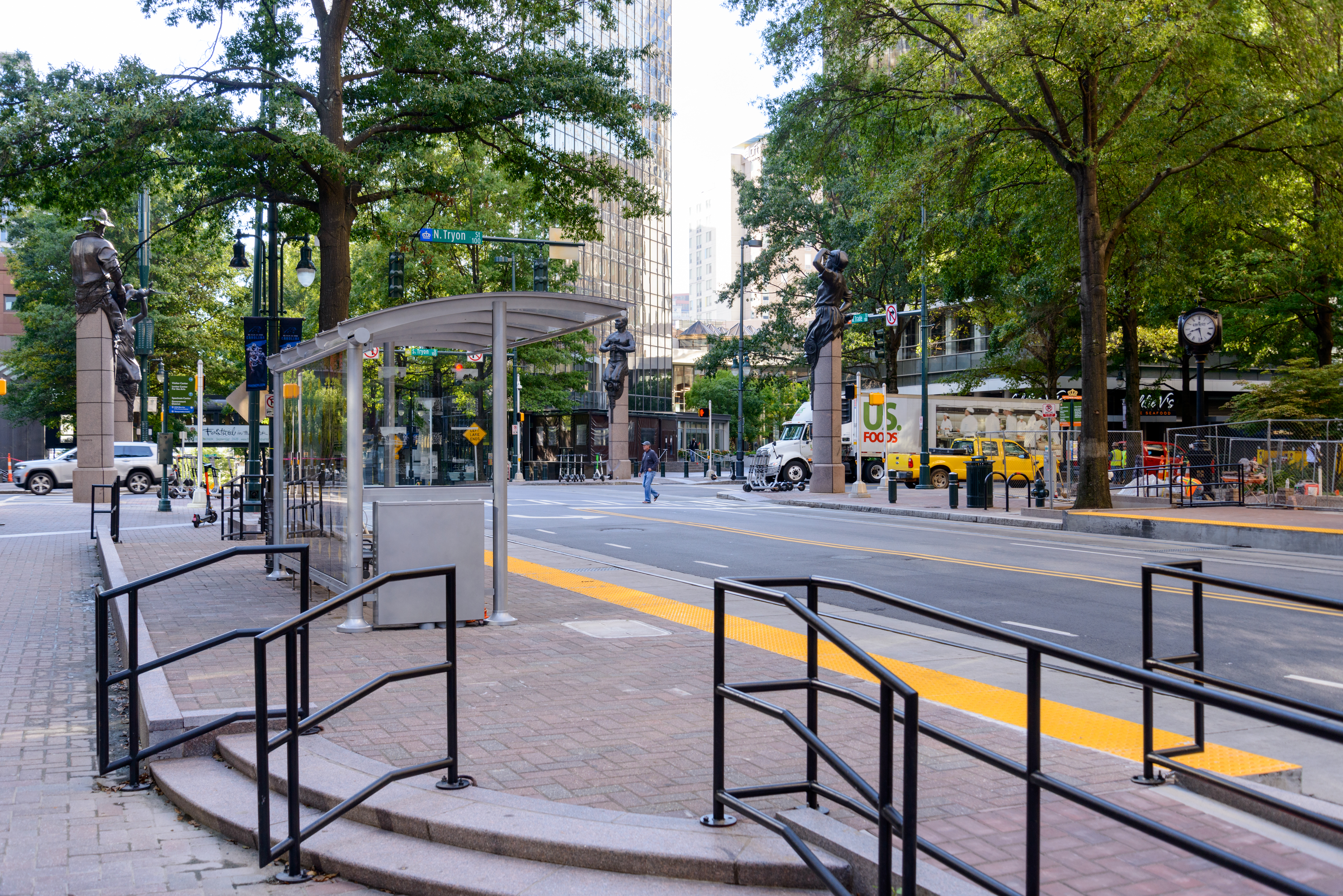
- Westbound platform and Independence Square

General information
- Location: 103 West Trade Street; Charlotte, North Carolina; United States
- Coordinates: 35.22742°N 80.84334°W
- Owner: Charlotte Area Transit System
- Platforms: 2 side platforms
- Tracks: 2
- Connections: CATS: 1, 7, 8, 11, 21, 22, 26, 34

Construction
- Structure type: At-grade
- Cycle facilities: Bicycle racks
- Accessible: yes

History
- Opened: August 30, 2021

Services
Preceding station	CATS	Following station
Mint Street toward French Street	CityLynx Gold Line	CTC/Arena toward Sunnyside Avenue
Location

Tryon Street is a streetcar station in Charlotte, North Carolina. The at-grade dual side platforms on West Trade Street are a stop along the CityLynx Gold Line, serving Independence Square and the second largest financial hub of the United States.

== Location ==
Tryon Street station is located at the intersection of Trade and Tryon Streets, in Uptown Charlotte. Surrounding Independence Square is 101 Independence Center, 112 Tryon Plaza, 121 West Trade, Bank of America Corporate Center, Charlotte Marriott City Center, One South at The Plaza, and Thomas Polk Park. Other nearby landmarks and popular destinations include: 129 West Trade, 200 South Tryon, 200 South College, Blumenthal Performing Arts Center, Charlotte Mecklenburg Library, Discovery Place, Fifth Third Center, First Citizens Plaza, Ivey's Hotel, Johnston Building, Overstreet Mall, and the Truist Center.

=== Artwork ===
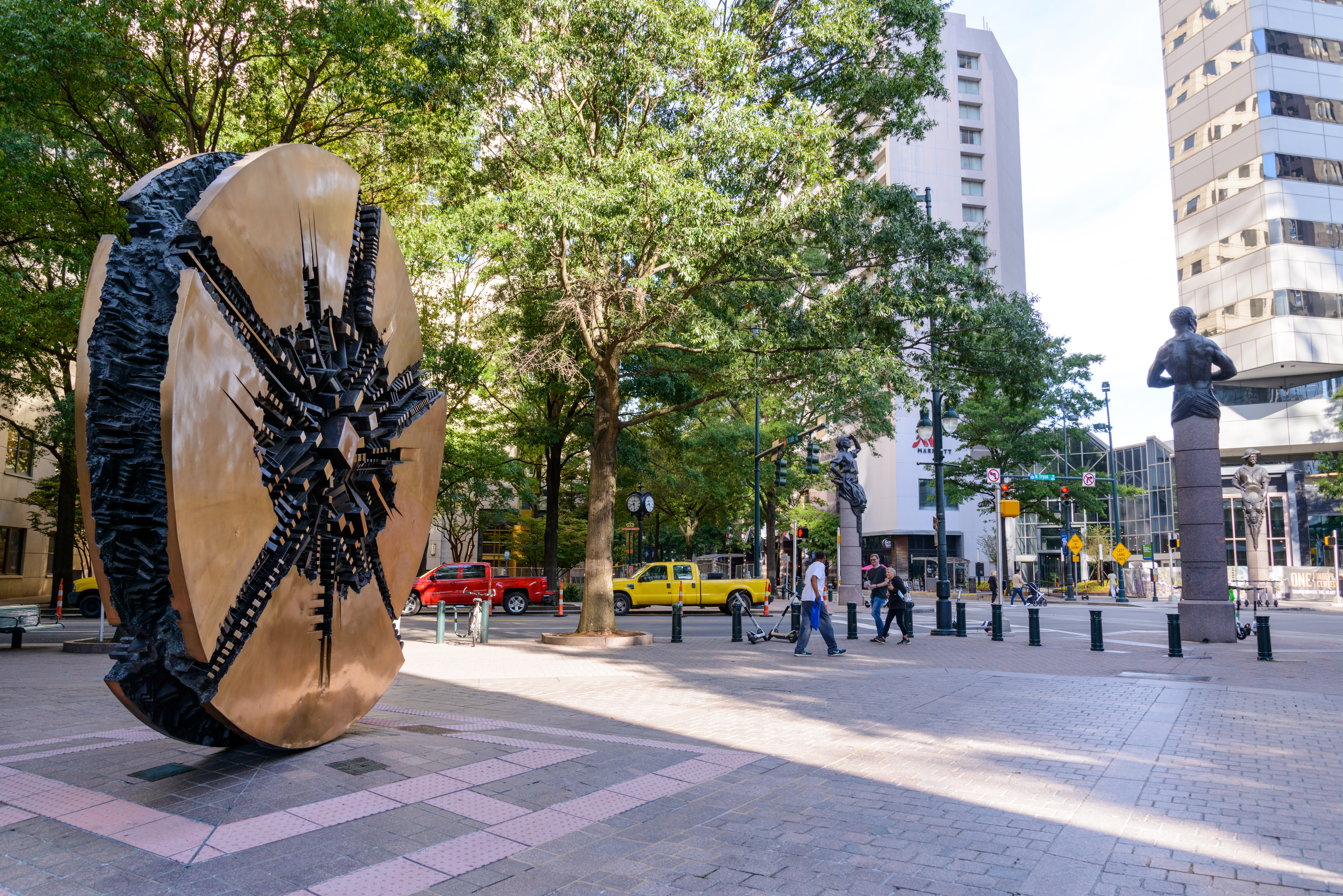
Independence Square

The Sculptures On The Square, dedicated on November 27, 1995, are a suite of four large bronze sculptures that monumentalizes the forces that have shaped the development of Charlotte and are located at each corner of the intersection of Independence Square. Created by American sculptor Raymond Kaskey, each figure, weighing approximately 5,000 pounds (2,300 kg), is mounted on a tall granite column approximately 20 feet (6.1 m) tall. Commerce, represented by a gold prospector, alludes to the Carolina Gold Rush and the foundation of the Charlotte U.S. Mint in 1835. The prospector is depicted emptying his pan onto the head of Alan Greenspan, a former Chairman of the Federal Reserve, symbolizing Charlotte's transition into a major financial center. Industry, depicted as a female millworker with a child at her feet, symbolizes the flourishing mill industry Charlotte once had, as well as the role of child labor in the era before federal labor laws protecting children from factory work. Transportation, represented by an African American male, portrayed with strength and dignity resting on his knees and with a hammer in his hand, a reference to the men who built the rail lines and thus transformed the city's economy. The number 1401, inscribed on the statue, represents engine 1401, also known as Charlotte, a steam locomotive that used to pull trains through the city. Future, is a depiction of a mother holding her child up in the air in a sort of playful embrace. The flowering branch at the bottom edge is dogwood, North Carolina's state flower. A hornet's nest, a long-standing symbol of Charlotte referencing the city's tenacity and resilience in the face of adversity, is from a rumored story of General Cornwallis calling the city a hornets nest of rebellion, during the American Revolution.

Il Grando Disco (also known as The Grand Disc), dedicated on October 2, 1974, was created by Italian sculptor Arnaldo Pomodoro. Located in front of One South, is a large, bronze coin-shaped sculpture containing a contrast of a smooth golden exteriors and a rougher, darker interior. It was commissioned and gifted to the city by Hugh McColl, a former chairman and CEO of Bank of America.

== History ==
Independence Square is the name of the intersection of Trade and Tryon Streets; it is recognition to the Mecklenburg Declaration of Independence, which county leaders signed on May 20, 1775, declaring independence from Great Britain after hearing of the battle of Lexington.

Tryon Street station was approved as a Gold Line Phase 2 stop in 2013, with construction beginning in Fall 2016. Though it was slated to open in early-2020, various delays pushed out the opening till mid-2021. The station opened to the public on August 30, 2021.

== Station layout ==
The station consists of two side platforms with two passenger shelters; ramps or steps provide platform access from the immediate sidewalks. The station's passenger shelters house two art installations by Jim Hirschfield and Sonya Ishii.
