= Truist Center =

Skyscraper in Charlotte, North Carolina

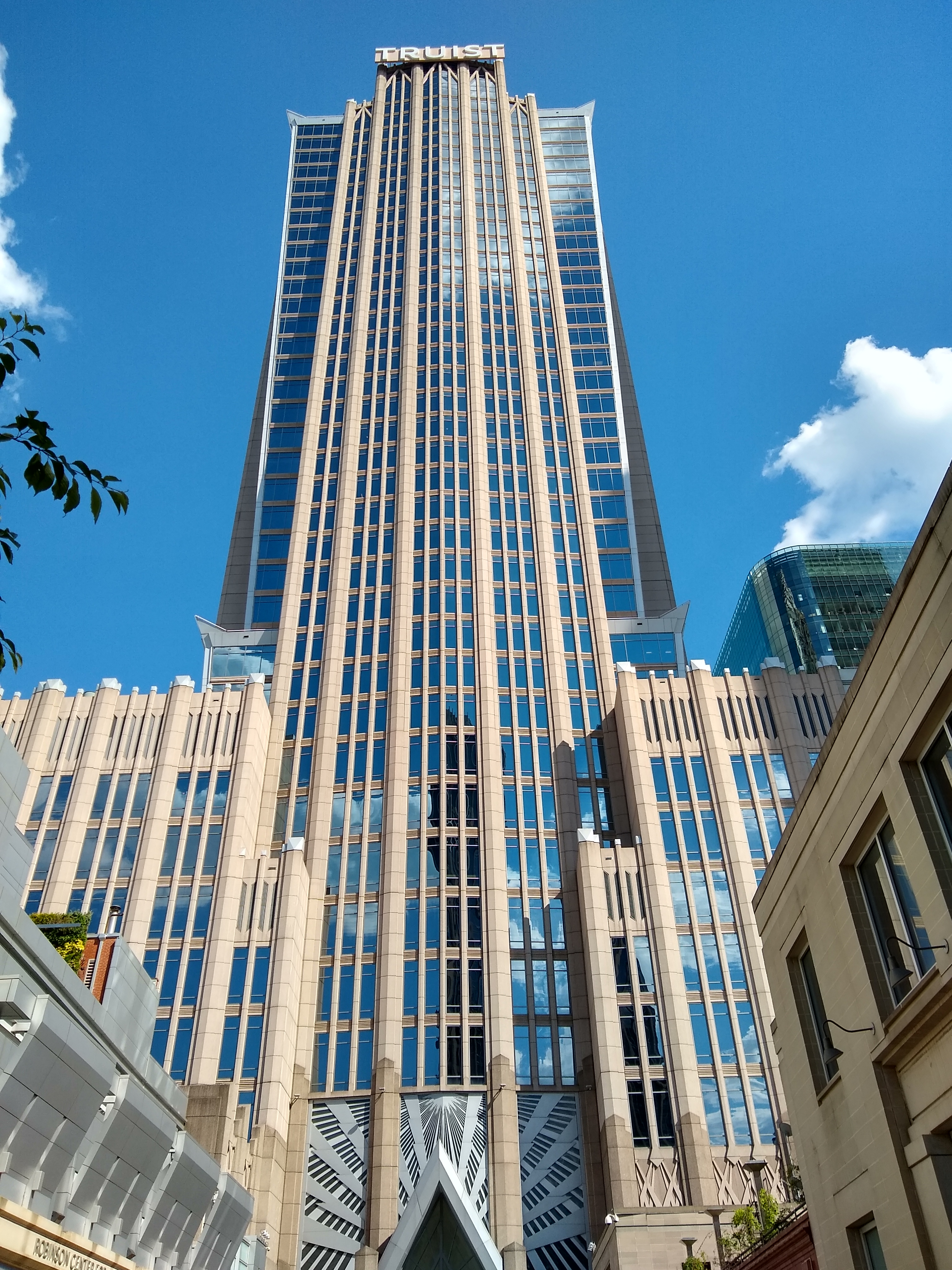
- Former names: Hearst Tower (2002–2019)

General information
- Type: Office building
- Location: 214 North Tryon Street, Charlotte, North Carolina, United States
- Coordinates: 35°13′39″N 80°50′27″W
- Named for: Truist Financial; Hearst Communications (2002–2020)
- Construction started: 1999
- Completed: 2002
- Opening: 2002
- Cost: $160 million (2002 USD)
- Owner: Truist Financial

Height
- Roof: 659 feet (201 m)

Technical details
- Floor count: 47
- Floor area: 970,002 sq ft (90,116.1 m^{2})
- Lifts/elevators: 29

Design and construction
- Architect: Smallwood, Reynolds, Stewart, Stewart & Associates, Inc.
- Developer: Trammel Crow Co. and The Keith Corporation

Other information
- Public transit: 7th Street; Tryon Street

The Truist Center is an Art Deco 47-story, 659 feet (201 m) skyscraper in Uptown Charlotte, North Carolina. The city's third tallest building, it is located along North Tryon Street. It was opened on November 14, 2002, and was the city's second tallest building, and was known as the Hearst Tower until 2019. The structure is composed of a 32-story tower resting atop a 15-floor podium. During Bank of America's occupancy in the building located on the podium was a three-story trading facility designed by Skidmore, Owings & Merrill and operated by Bank of America. The trading facility included a 6,000-square-foot (560 m^{2}), two-story trading floor. Now the former trading floor is part of Truist's 100,000 square feet (9,300 m^{2}) technology innovation center. The building is currently the headquarters of Truist, which purchased the building in March 2020.

== Architecture ==
The building's reverse floor plate design makes the upper floors average 24,000 square feet (2,200 m^{2}) compared to an average of only 20,000 square feet (1,900 m^{2}) for the lower floors. The building was specifically designed to use the Art Deco 1920s style Bank of America Corporate Center had used, but create a building that has a unique look and was taller than the 60-story Corporate Center. The emphasis on rectilinear and symmetry was altered to use triangle motifs, which are displayed in the College Street and Tryon Street entrances to make them look vaguely similar to Gothic arches. On the fourth-floor exterior, the black granite and precast concrete panels intersection look similar to interlocking triangles.

The plaza of the building on Tryon Street was created to be a mini-Rockefeller Center. The Rockefeller Center in Midtown Manhattan is composed of 19 buildings. Hearst Tower Plaza is 160 feet long and 65 wide. It was intentionally lined with public art and restaurants with the goal of creating a shared public experience and bolstering Uptown as an arts destination. Charlotte-Mecklenburg Planning Director Martin Cramton states this about the plaza's impact "It will create a tremendous element of surprise for people as they walk along Tryon Street. They will be absolutely amazed."

The building's College Street lobby features brass railings designed by Edgar Brandt that were rescued from Le Bon Marche department store in Paris. On the mezzanine level, it connects to neighboring Bank of America Corporate Center via skybridge, as part of the Overstreet Mall. The Truist Plaza, a 40,000-square-foot (3,700 m^{2}) public plaza lined with restaurants, shops, and an art gallery, is located next to the main entrance off North Tryon Street. In front of the plaza is a 10-foot (3.0 m) glass and bronze sculpture crafted by Howard Ben Tré entitled Castellan Figure. Within the lobby is Collaborate 214, a coworking space introduced in October 2014. The building's unique design was to complement the wedding cake design of nearby Bank of America Corporate Center by being the inverse of the headquarter's design.

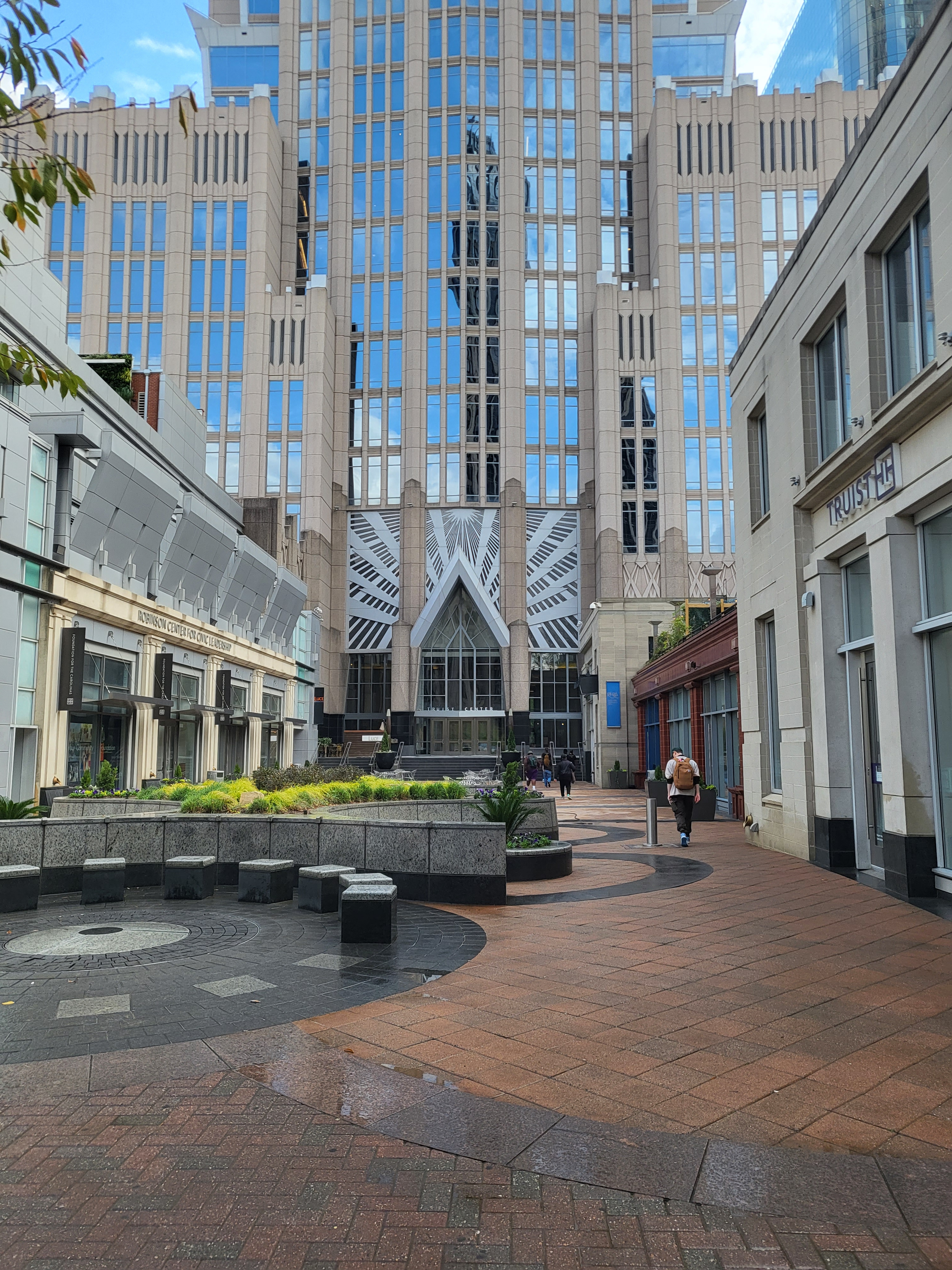
The building's Tryon Street courtyard in November 2022

== History ==
It was announced in August 1998 that the CityFair building would be torn down to make space for the building. The CityFair building opened in October 1988. It had three levels of retail and a 700-space parking structure. The public-private partnership with the city and developer Carley Capital was a bad financial decision for the city. The city spent $7 million on the project out of the original project cost of $30.4 million and the developer filed for bankruptcy shortly after the building's opening. It was the biggest retail project since the Overstreet Mall in the 1970s considered the next generation in retail at the time. The city owned the parking structure and was going to get a percentage of the project's annual profits. In December 1988, Chemical Bank acquired the CityFair building. At that time, it had 60 stores and a food court.

Hearst Tower was developed as a joint venture of Trammel Crow Co. and The Keith Corporation for Bank of America. The original cost was $160 million. The building proposal by Trammel Crow was made in June 1998. Then in December 1998 the planned building was renamed Hearst Tower after the Hearst Corporation agreed to lease 160,000 square feet (15,000 m^{2}), their space had increased to 200,000 square feet (19,000 m^{2}) before the building opened. The Hearst Corporation from relocated from the Carillon Tower. Other large tenants announced at the time were law firm Kennedy Covington Lobdell and Hickman leasing 157,000 square feet (14,600 m^{2}), an unnamed tenant leasing 65,000 square feet (6,000 m^{2}), and Bank of America occupying 380,000 square feet (35,000 m^{2}). At the time of the announcement the building was 90% leased. Other tenants that signed leases ahead of construction included Law firm Mayer Brown and Platt with 40,000 square feet (3,700 m^{2}) and Pricewaterhouse-Coopers with 80,000 square feet (7,400 m^{2}). Also, the building is planned to have 40,000 square feet (3,700 m^{2}) of retail space. Prior to the start of construction 94% of the space was leasing, with only 35,000 square feet (3,300 m^{2}) not preleased.

The CityFair building was imploded in June 1999. Then in August the original building permits for the footing and foundation of the building were issued. Construction started soon after in the fall of 1999. As construction neared completion in early February 2002 the 700-foot tower crane was removed. The building was opened on November 14, 2002.

In June 2012, Bank of America sold the building to Parkway Properties for $250 million. Then in 2016 when Cousins Properties Incorporated merged with Parkway Properties they became the new owner. At the time of the sale, Bank of America occupied 322,311 square feet (29,943.7 m^{2}), and the building was 94% leased.

On 12 June 2019, it was announced that Truist, a bank holding company to be formed from the merger of BB&T and SunTrust banks, had selected Hearst Tower for its future new corporate headquarters. Truist will occupy 561,000 square feet (52,100 m^{2}) in the tower and has the option to buy the tower from Cousins in the fourth quarter of 2019 for $455.5 million. On 14 August 2019, Hearst Communications announced it would move out of its namesake tower to offices near the city's Ballantyne neighborhood in early 2020 to make way for Truist. The space left by Bank of America, Hearst Communications, and K&L Gates moving out of the tower allowed Truist to occupy over half its square footage. U.S. Bank, PricewaterhouseCoopers, Bradley, and Dixon Hughes Goodman continue to be tenants in the building.

Truist announced plans to relocate the bank's executive team, corporate communications, finance, human resources, insurance, legal, technology, and risk management to the building. The bank will move in phases in August 2020 and lasting until June 2021. The bank plans to have as many as 2,000 in the building. Truist has announced that the Charlotte innovation center planned to bring technology, legal, and accounting staff together with its clients, will be located in the building. As of December 2020, it was under construction.

On December 11, 2019, Truist Financial announced it had officially exercised its option to purchase the building from Cousins Properties for $455.5 million and would rename the tower Truist Center. New signage will also be added. The deal was completed March 31, 2020. However, due to the COVID-19 pandemic, further actions will be delayed.

In November 2020 four signs were raised, two (on the North Tryon and North College street sides) with the Truist name, and two with its logo. The signage caused considerable controversy, with critics saying it was too sharp a contrast with the tower's curves. The building's architect, Charles Hull, denounced the new signage as an act of vandalism. Local media outlet Axios Charlotte has written a number of articles about locals' reactions to the lights and signs. In one article a resident said, "God, what a disgrace to a previously gorgeous landmark. I'd rather we just had a hole in the ground.” The lights and signs have also caused residents to create a Change.org petition to have them removed.

Another large tenant of the building is U.S. Bank, with some 300 employees occupying 81,424 square feet (7,564.5 m^{2}) as of 2014. Another 560 were added in 2020. A large number are in compliance and technology. The bank views Charlotte as an important hub that gives them access to potential talent and one of the company's fastest-growing markets. The bank has been opening retail branches in Charlotte following locating of its vice chair and head of corporate and commercial banking to Charlotte.

In June 2022 Truist Financial completed construction of their 100,000 square feet (9,300 m^{2}) technology innovation center. It consists of floors 14 and 15, which were formerly trading floors. The space will serve as a research lab and collaboration hub for engineers. To encourage collaboration it utilizes an open floor plan with different layouts for specific teams.

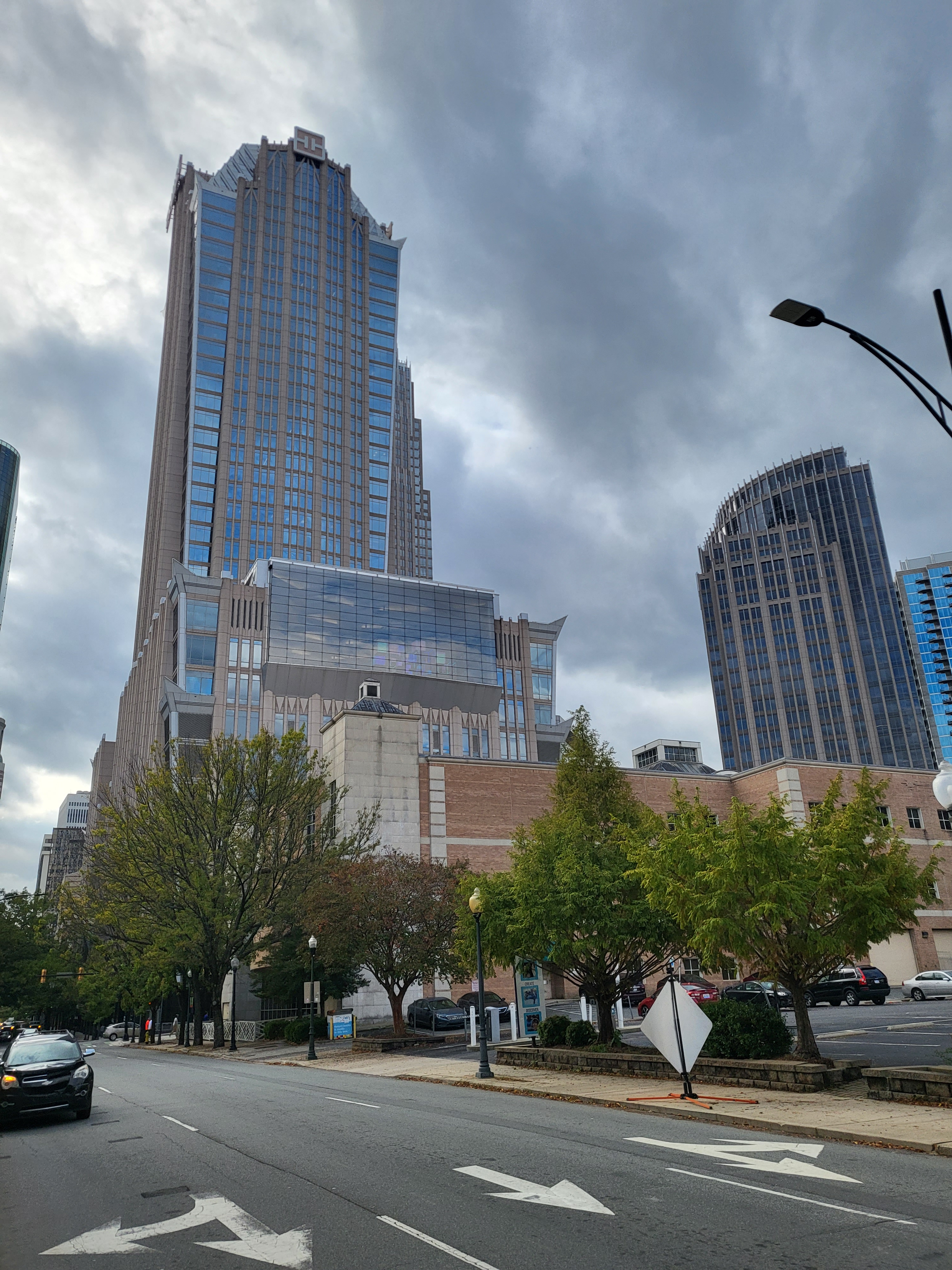
The building viewed from College Street with the two-story Innovation Center windows visible in November 2022

== See also ==
- List of tallest buildings in Charlotte
- List of tallest buildings in North Carolina
- List of tallest buildings in the United States
