= TradeMark =

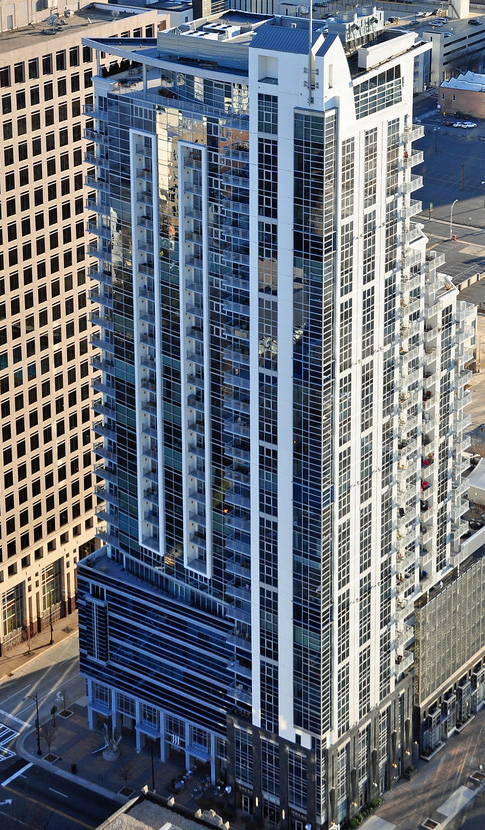
- Interactive map of the TradeMark area

General information
- Status: Completed
- Type: Residential Tower
- Location: Uptown Charlotte, Charlotte, North Carolina, United States
- Coordinates: 35.2289°N 80.8457°W
- Construction started: 2005
- Opening: 2007

Height
- Antenna spire: 325 feet (99 m)

Technical details
- Floor count: 28

Design and construction
- Architect: David Furman/Architecture

Other information
- Public transit access: Mint Street

TradeMark (a.k.a. "TradeMark Condos") is a 325-foot-tall (99 m), primarily residential, skyscraper in Charlotte, North Carolina, United States. It was completed in 2007 and has 28 floors and 200 residential units. Additionally it is one of the tallest buildings in Uptown Charlotte.

== News stories ==
WBTV of Charlotte has reported on three floods and elevator problems in the one-year-old building, raising concern over the quality of construction. Repairs for the June 3rd, 2008, flood (reported on June 4) that were promised to the flood victims by management company Duvall have, as of August 1, 2008, yet to take place. Victims of the prior floods complained about Duvall's lack of responsiveness. TradeMark was builder Boulevard Centro's first major high-rise building construction project.

== See also ==
- List of tallest buildings in Charlotte
