= AC Hotel/Residence Inn Charlotte City Center =

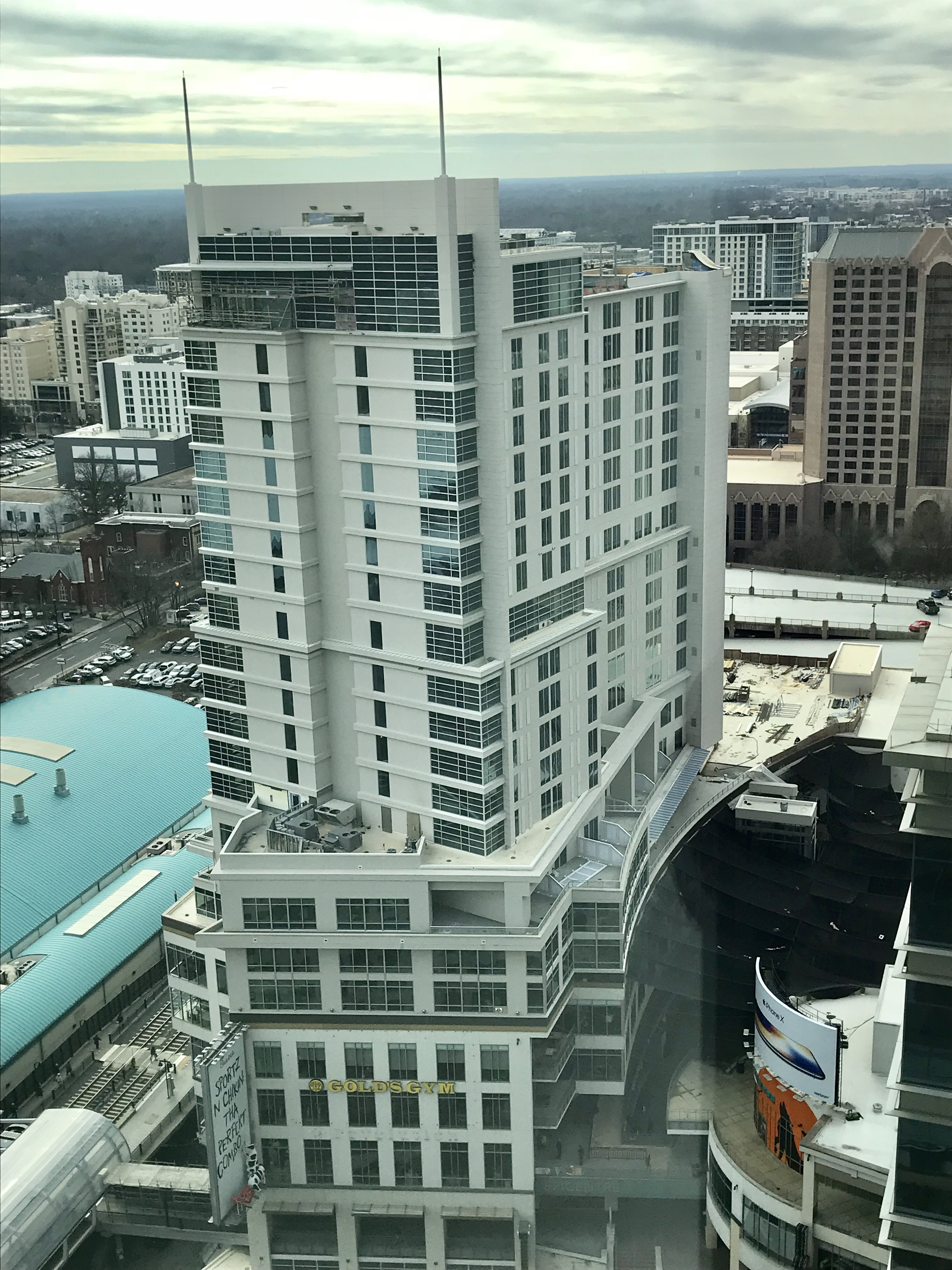
- Interactive map of the AC Hotel/Residence Inn Charlotte City Center area

General information
- Status: Completed
- Type: Hotel
- Location: Uptown Charlotte, Charlotte, North Carolina, USA
- Coordinates: 35.229232°N 80.845041°W
- Construction started: 2016
- Completed: February 2018
- Opening: June 2018

Height
- Antenna spire: 320 feet (98 m)
- Top floor: 22

Technical details
- Floor count: 22

Design and construction
- Developer: Charlotte FC, LLC
- Other designers: McKibbon Hospitality; Charlotte’s Vision Ventures
- Main contractor: Cleveland Construction

AC Hotel/Residence Inn Charlotte City Center (formally known as 210 Trade and AC Hotel/Residence Inn Charlotte EpiCentre) is a 22-story, 320 feet (98 m) hotel highrise in Uptown Charlotte, North Carolina. As of 2026, it is the fourtieth tallest building in Charlotte.

== Site ==
The building comprises two hotels, AC Hotel and Residence Inn by Marriott, which share a lobby at 220 East Trade Street between South Brevard and South College Streets in Uptown Charlotte, North Carolina, United States. It is part of the Queen City Quarter development. The Charlotte Rail Trail runs directly adjacent to the building to the east.

The hotels total 300 rooms. AC Hotel occupies floors 5 to 12 with 184 rooms, and features the AC lounge, which is open to the public. Residence Inn occupies floors 14 to 21 with 116 rooms, blending studios and one and two bedroom residences designed for longer stays. The Nuvolé Rooftop TwentyTwo bar is located on the 22nd floor, alongside a penthouse suite for rent.

== History ==
=== Planning and construction ===
The building was initially planned to be a residential tower known as 210 Trade, which began construction in 2007. Once completed, 210 Trade would have had 52 floors and become the tallest residential building in Charlotte, surpassing The Vue, as well as the second-tallest building in Charlotte by total floor count, after the Bank of America Corporate Center. Construction stalled during the 2008 financial crisis and the building sat unfinished until 2016.

=== Current status ===
Construction resumed in March 2016, and the 22-story tower was completed in 2018 and the hotels officially opened in August of that year. The general contractor was Cleveland Construction, and McKibbon Hospitality and Charlotte’s Vision Ventures participated in the development of the project. At the time of opening, AC Hotel rooms started at $279 a night, and Residence Inn rooms started at $259. The hotels feature artworks by over 20 local artists.

== See also ==
- List of tallest buildings in Charlotte
- Charlotte center city
