= CNN Grill =

Pop-up restaurant

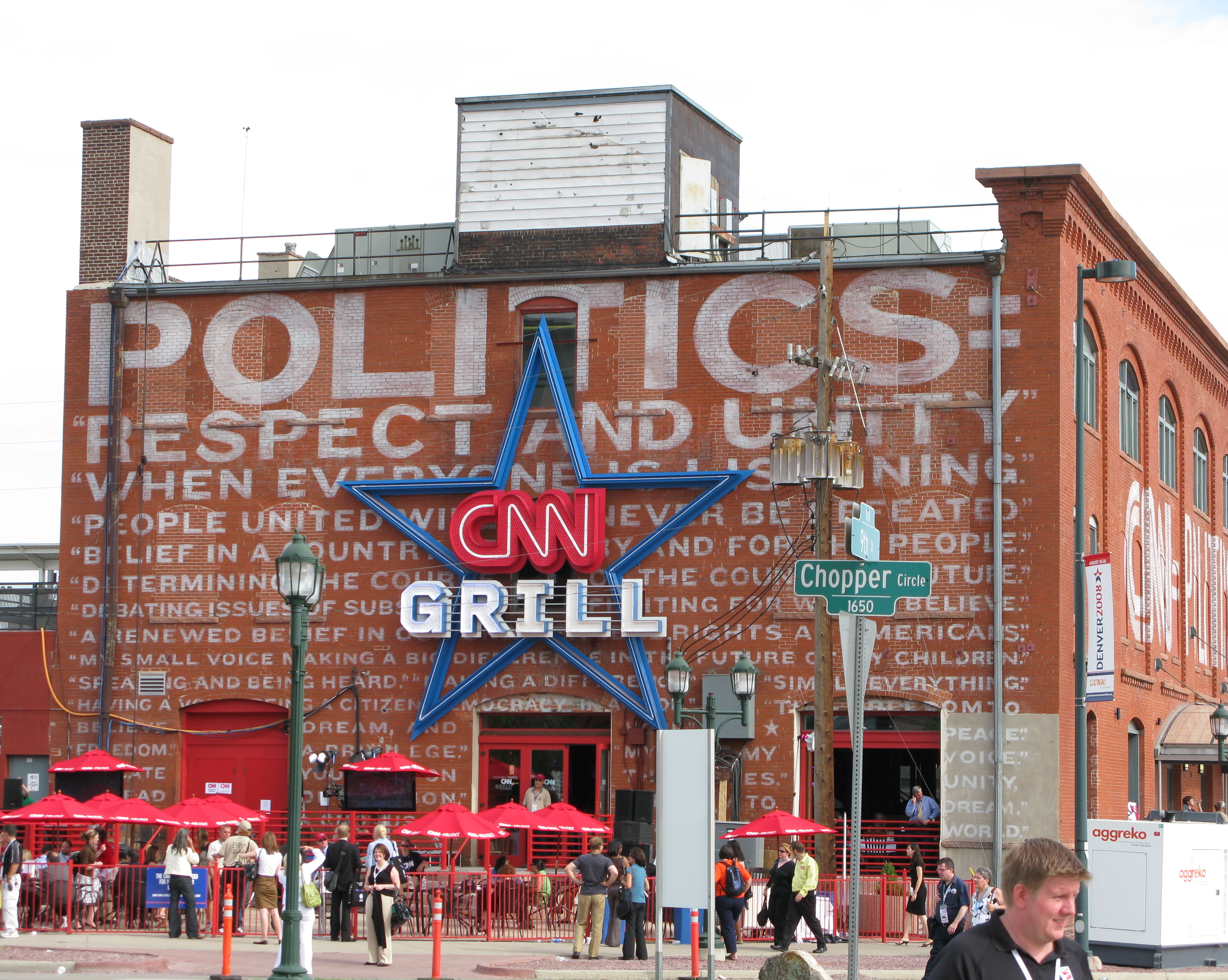
CNN Grill at the 2008 Democratic convention

The CNN Grill is a pop-up restaurant and broadcasting studio that the American cable news channel CNN has operated near the venues of major party United States presidential nominating conventions, as well as at the 2011 and 2012 iterations of the South by Southwest festival. The concept originated as the "CNN Diner" during the 2004 Republican convention. Since 2008, CNN Grills have been operated at each major party presidential nominating convention (except for the COVID-19 pandemic impacted conventions of the 2020 election).

== Overview ==
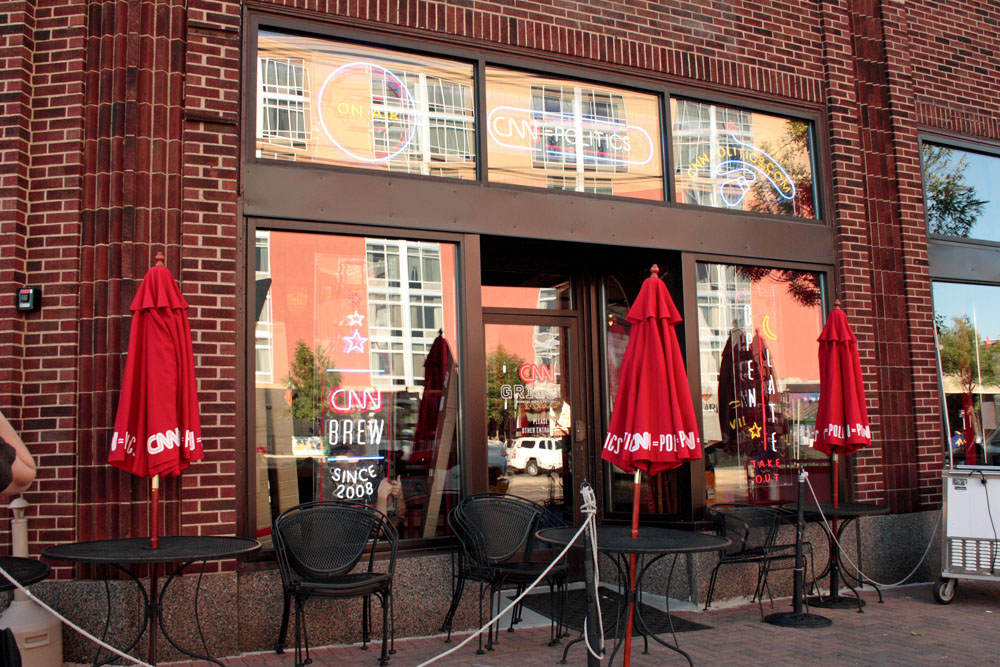
Outdoor seating at the CNN Grill for the 2008 Republican convention

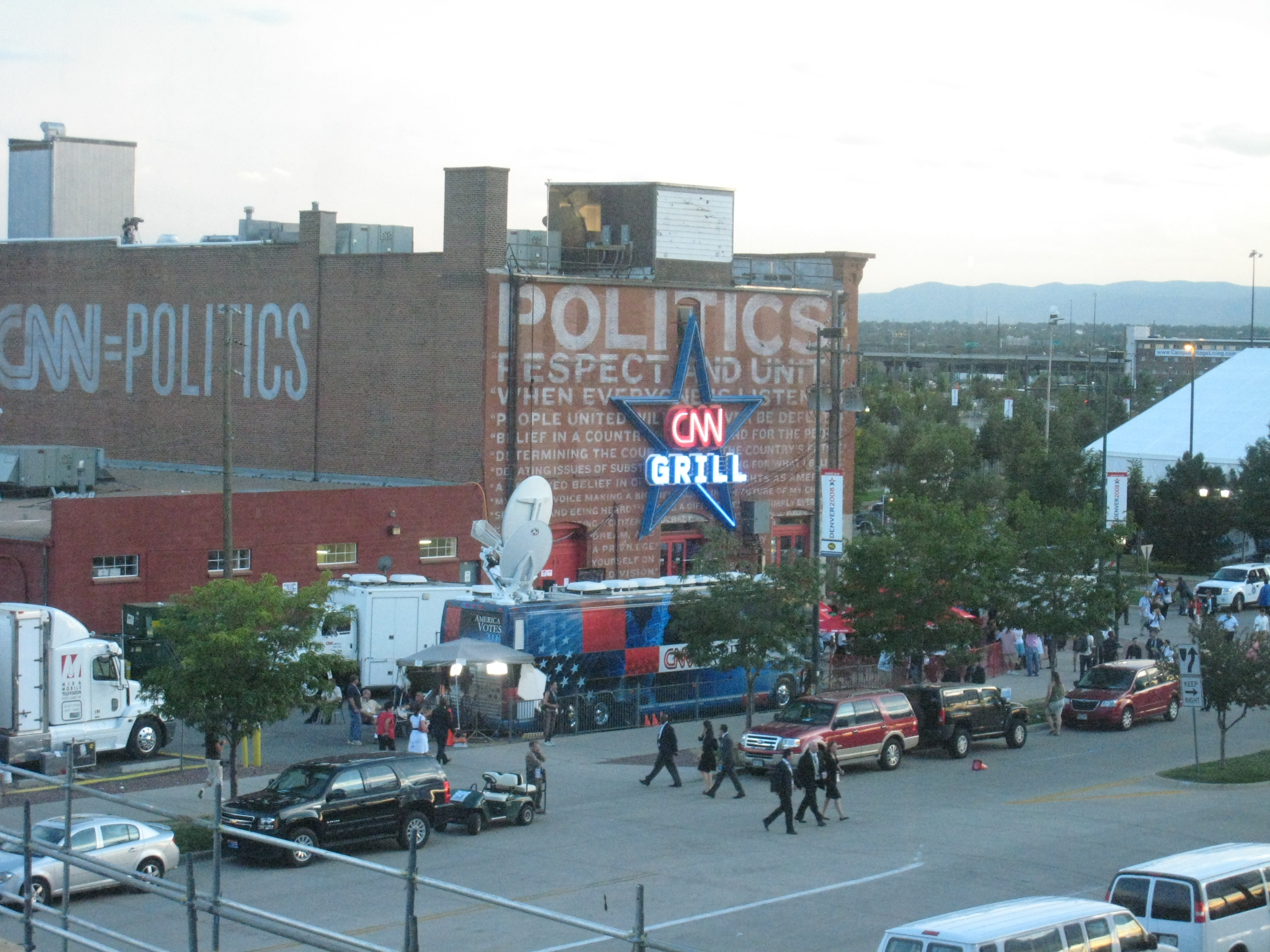
CNN Grill at the 2008 Democratic convention, with a CNN-branded bus parked outside

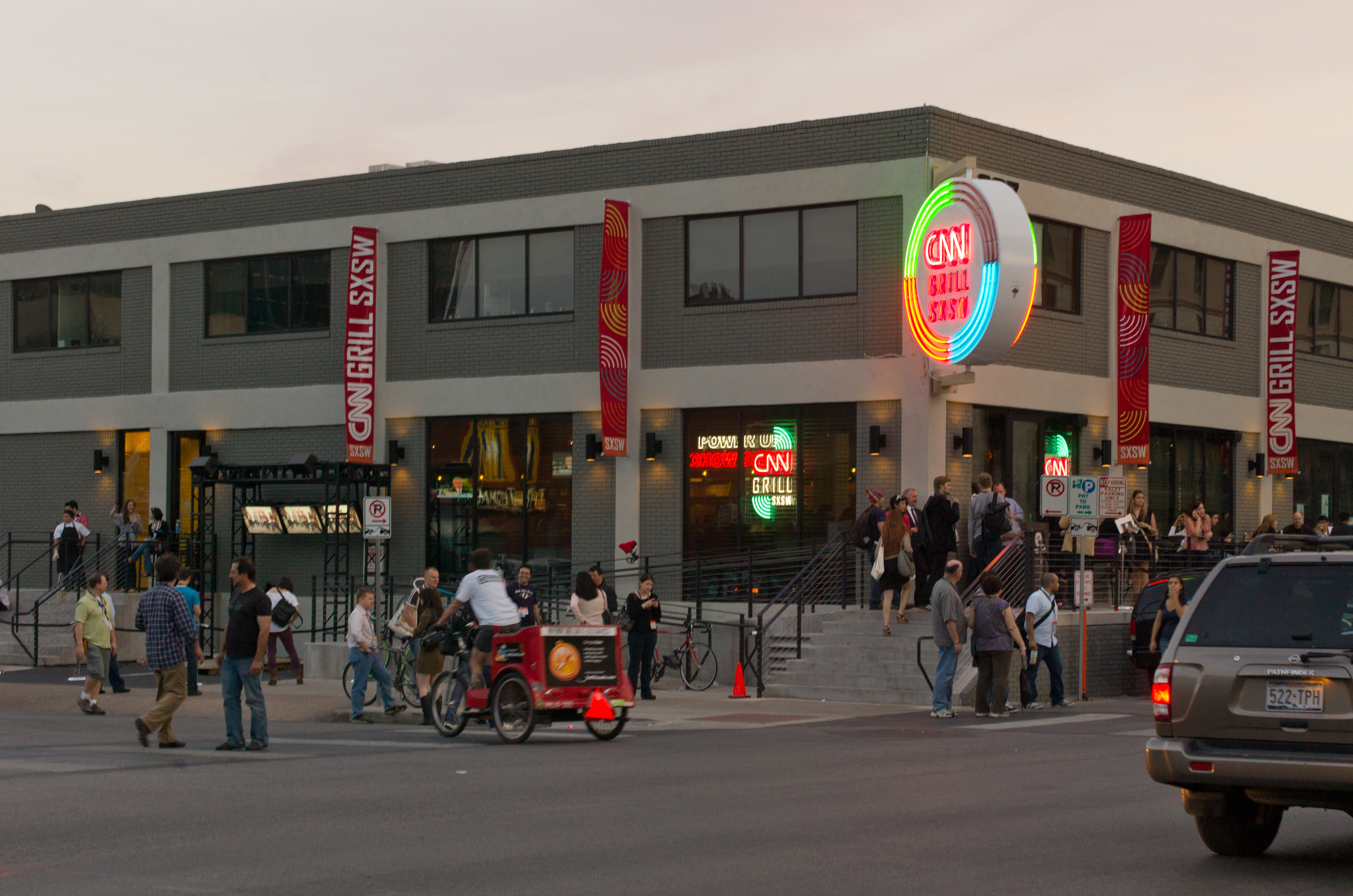
CNN Grill at South by Southwest in 2011

CNN Grills are pop-up restaurants and broadcast production centers operated by the American cable news broadcaster CNN, mainly being established near the venues of major party United States presidential nominating conventions. CNN Grills serve both as a dinning venue for event attendees and broadcast studio for CNN's convention coverage. CNN Grills are not open to the public, and are instead are invite-only venues where food is served for free. The CNN Grill has been described as serving as the "headquarters" for CNN's convention coverage. Combined, the CNN Grills at the 2008, 2012, and 2016 conventions drew 5,000 visitors.

The value to CNN of staging the CNN Grill at presidential conventions is, in part, the brand visibility it creates for CNN at conventions. Furthermore, since CNN Grills have proven a popular sought-after location for conventiongoers to congregate, it is credited with aiding CNN in fostering relations that can benefit it in booking on-air talent. The venue also serves the network as a live studio with a kinetic backdrop that benefits CNN by livening the on-screen optics of its convention coverage.

== Presidential conventions ==
=== 2004 ===
The concept of the CNN Grill debuted at the 2004 Republican convention in New York City, as the "CNN Diner". It was staged at the Tick Tock Diner, located near the main venue of the Republican convention (Madison Square Garden). For the concept, received an award for "Best Use of Event Marketing" in the 2005 annual recognition given by the marketing industry magazine PROMO.

=== 2008 ===
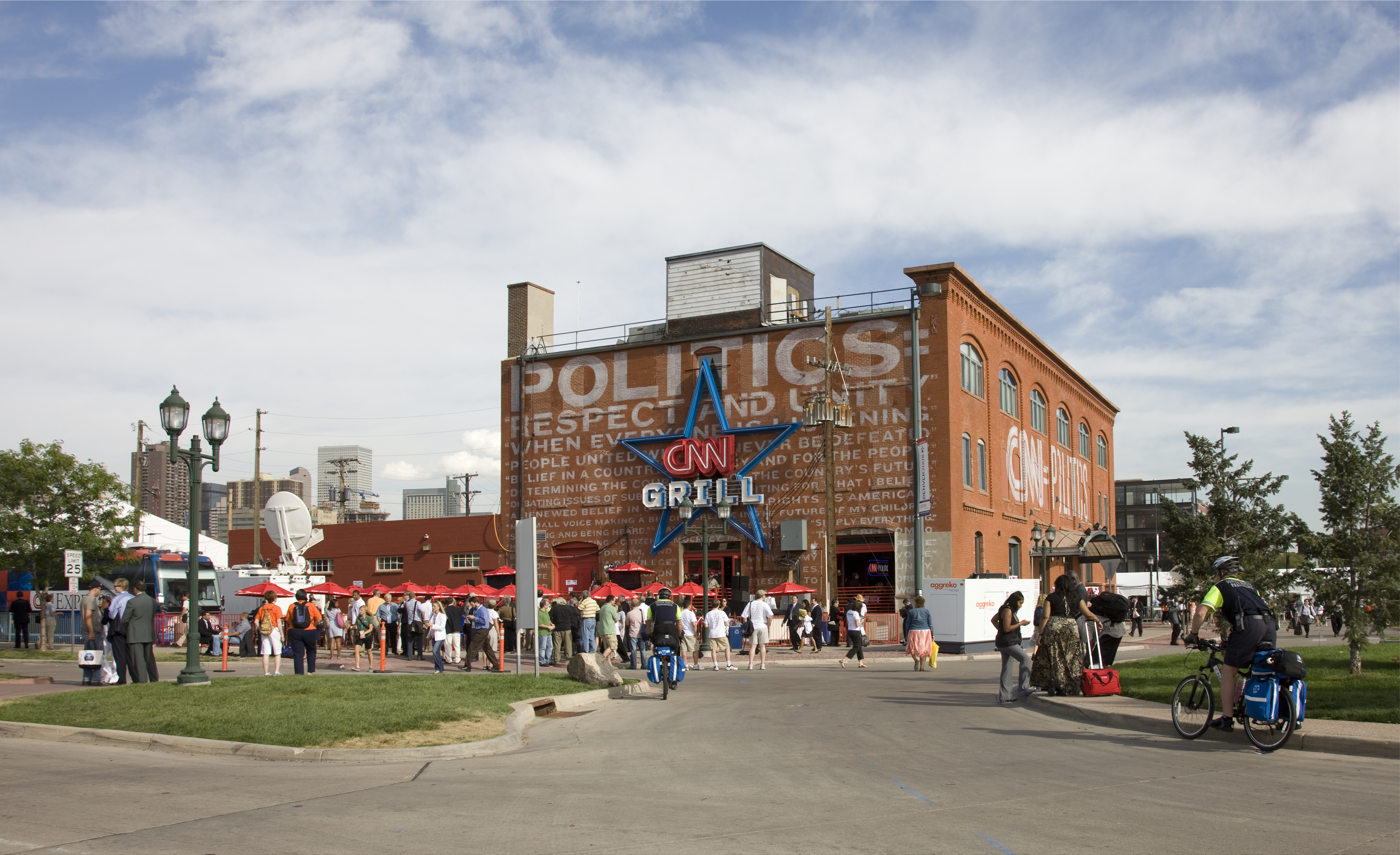
CNN Grill at Brooklyn's restaurant during the 2008 Democratic convention in Denver

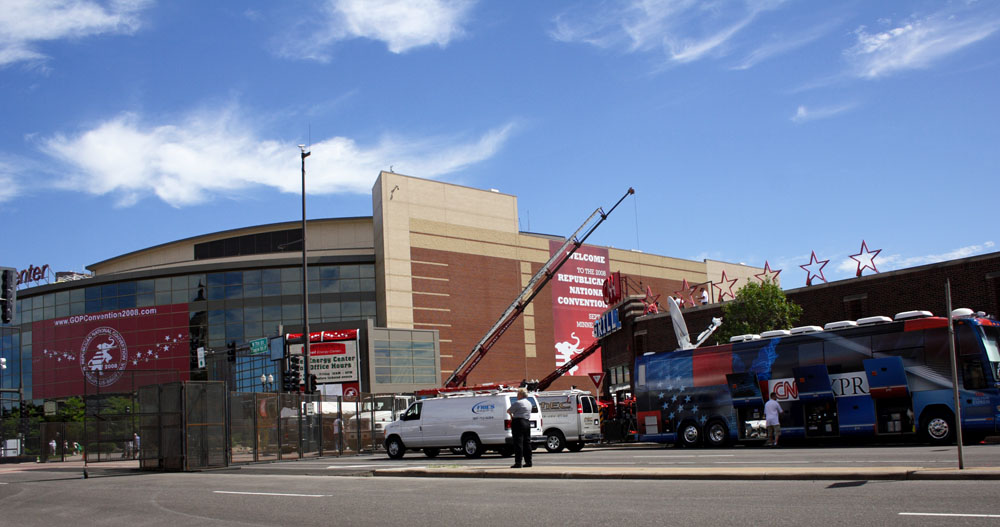
CNN Grill at Eagle Street Grille (right), photographed on the eve of the 2008 Republican convention in Saint Paul, which was held inside of the Xcel Energy Center (left)

In 2008 the concept returned under the name "CNN Grill", with CNN erecting CNN Grills in both convention cities. For the 2008 Democratic convention in Denver, a CNN Grill was housed at Brooklyn's, a restaurant located adjacent to the main convention venue (the Pepsi Center). For the 2008 Republican convention in Saint Paul, the CNN Grill was located at Eagle Street Grille, located adjacent to main convention venue (the Xcel Energy Center). Each location was adjacent to the delegate entrances to the "hard security zone" of the conventions. The CNN Election Express bus was parked outside of the CNN Grills during the conventions.

The CNN Grills at the 2008 conventions were developed for CNN by Civic Entertainment Group. During the convention, the venues functioned both as eateries and as studios for television broadcasts and online content. The venues were each a secondary broadcast studio for CNN's convention coverage. At the CNN Grills, a food menu by Danny Meyer's Union Square Hospitality Group and a special "CNN Brew" by Breckenridge Brewery were served. Michael Romano served as executive chef of the venues.

The brick exterior of the Denver venue was temporarily adorned with quotes relating to politics. To collect these quotes, CNNPolitics.com editors had asked its site users to submit personal (ten words or less) descriptions of what politics meant to them.

The CNN Grill concept was awarded in 2009's CableFax "CableFAXIES" honors in the "Media Event" category.

=== 2012 ===
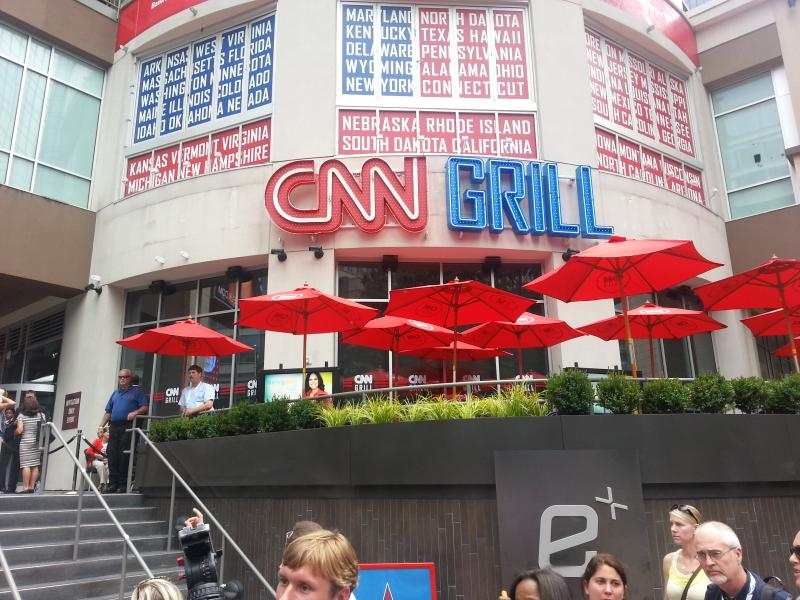
CNN Grill for the 2012 Republican convention in Tampa

In Tampa, the CNN Grill was located across the entrance plaza from the main convention venue (the Tampa Bay Times Forum). In Charlotte, the CNN Grill was located at EpiCentre, near the main convention venue (the Time Warner Cable Arena). The menus in each city were designed to reflect local food culture of the convention locations.

In Tampa, the atmosphere was likened by Vanity Fair to a sports bar.

=== 2016 ===
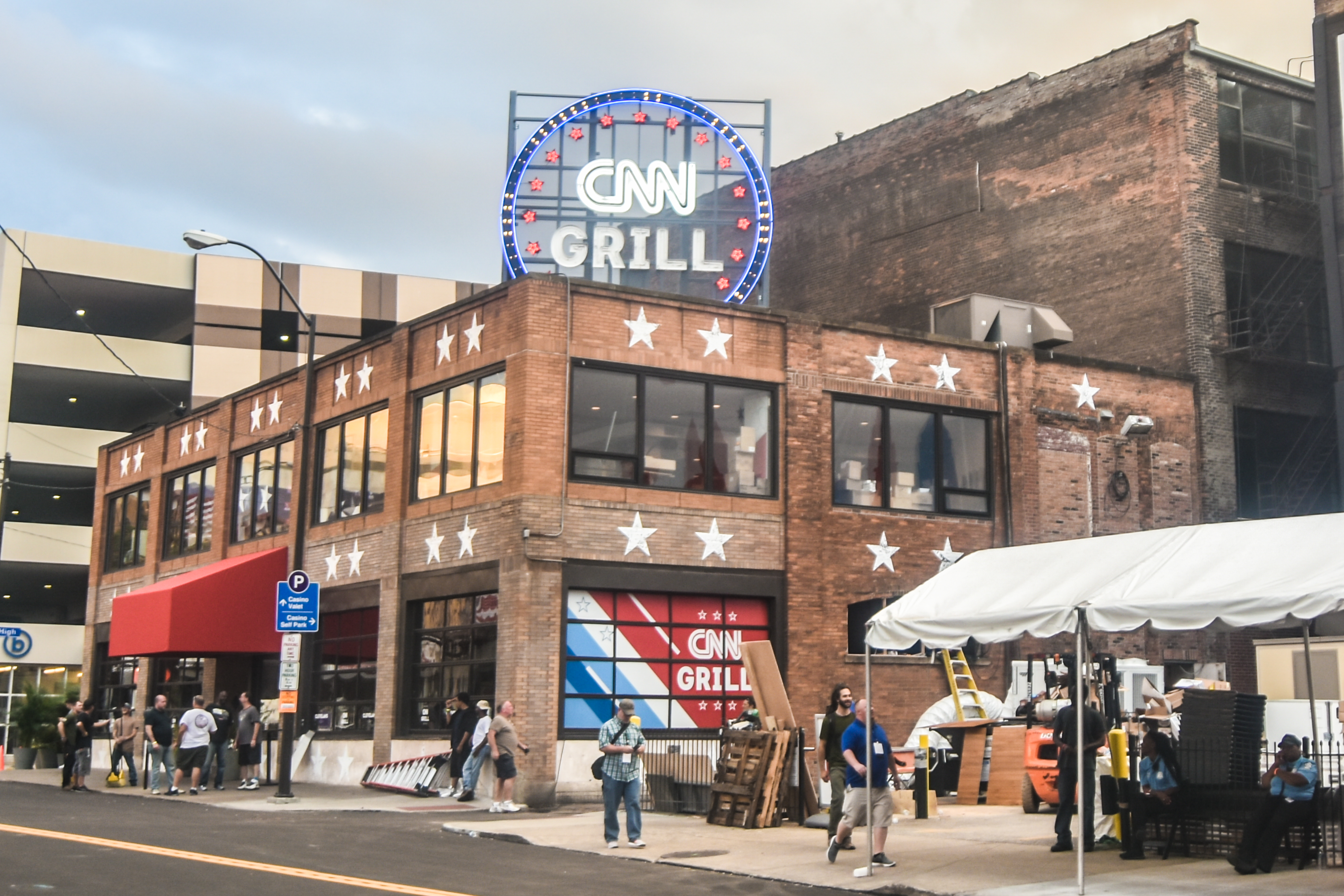
CNN Grill at Harry Buffalo for the 2016 Republican convention in Cleveland

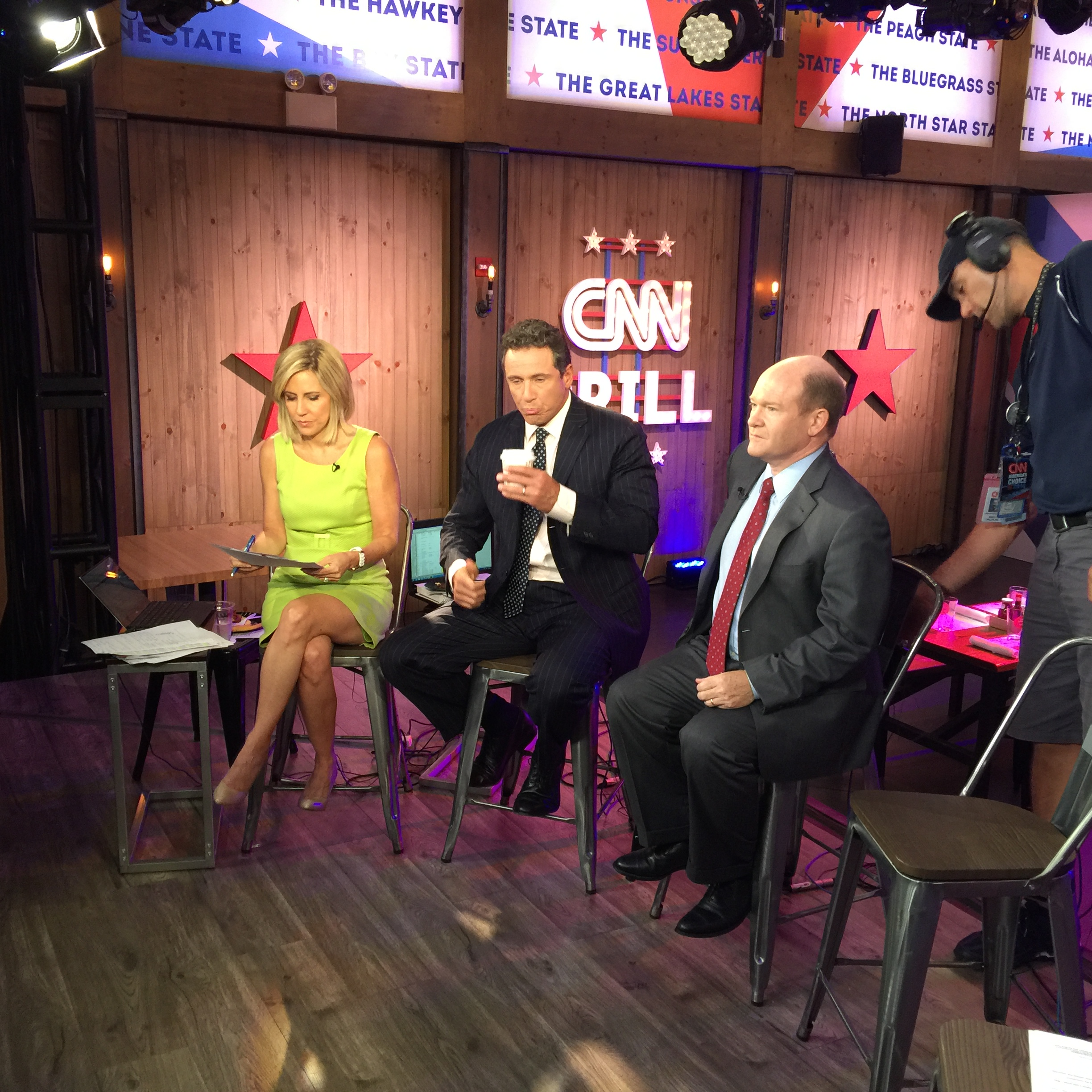
Reporters Alisyn Camerota and Chris Cuomo sit with U.S. Senator Chris Coons before an interview at the CNN Grill at Xfinity Live during the 2016 Democratic convention in Philadelphia

In 2016, CNN partnered with Google for its CNN Grills.

For the 2016 Republican convention in Cleveland, the CNN Grill was located in the restaurant Harry Buffalo, located adjacent to the main convention venue (the Quicken Loans Arena). During the convention, it featured a restaurant and multiple bars in addition to production space serving as CNN's "home base" for its convention coverage. Its menu featured offerings from local establishments, including Pierogies of Cleveland; Mitchell's Ice Cream; Humble Pie Baking Company; and Rising Star Coffee Roasters.

For the 2016 Democratic convention in Philadelphia, the CNN Grill was located in Victory Beer Hall, a facility located inside of the Xfinity Live! district complex to the convention's main venue (the Wells Fargo Center). Its menu featured offerings from local establishments, including Federal Donuts, Little Baby's Ice Cream, and La Colombe Coffee Roasters.

=== 2020 plans ===
Before the COVID-19 pandemic pandemic led to a downsizing of conventions, CNN had planned to stage its CNN Grill yet again. CNN had already reserved use of the Turner Hall for the CNN Grill it had planned to stage during the 2020 Democratic convention in Milwaukee. Like at past conventions, its announced CNN Grill at Turner Hall was to be a CNN broadcast studio and a dinning space operating during the convention. CNN had been seeking city permission to install temporary signage on the exterior of the venue, which required permission due to the building's status as an historic landmark. When the Democratic Party delayed its convention dates (in hopes that a later date would increase the likelihood of being able to stage a full-scale presidential convention), CNN worked was able to secure use of Turner Hall for the dates it would now need it to stage a CNN Grill during the new convention dates, with the venue needing to cancel multiple other bookings to accommodate CNN. However, CNN's plans were abandoned due to the impacts of the pandemic, with CNN pulling out once it became apparent that pandemic health concerns were likely to motivate Democrats to downscale their convention into a largely-virtual event.

=== 2024 ===
Logo for CNN-Politico Grill at 2024 conventions

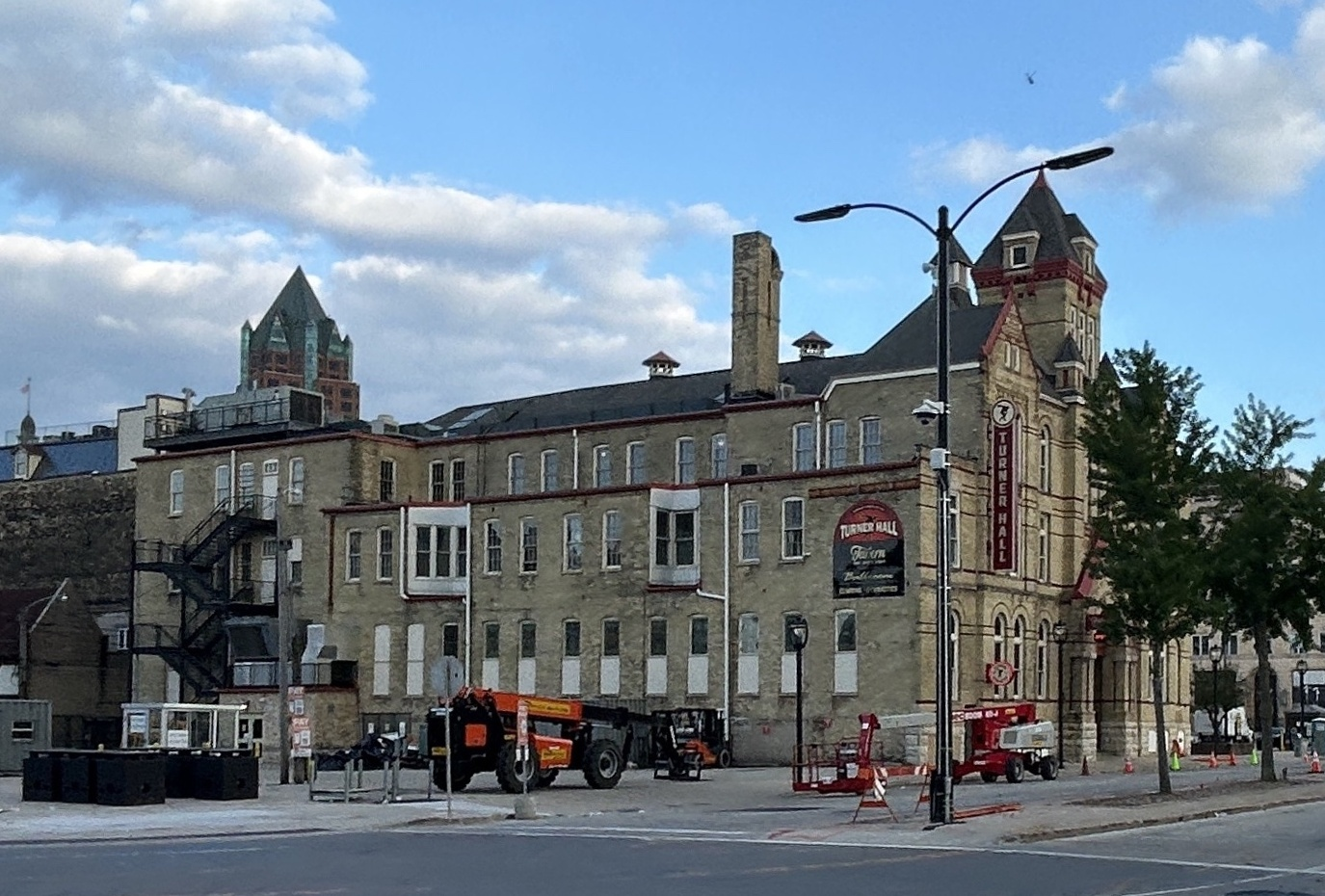
Turner Hall, photographed the day after the conclusion of the 2024 Republican convention in Milwaukee

The CNN Grill returned at the 2024 presidential conventions, being presented in partnership with Politico as the "CNN-Politico Grill". In 2024, the venues were not only used for CNN productions, but also for Politico productions. The venues served as a production space for television broadcasts, livestreams, and podcasts. The 2024 locations were location within the security perimeters surrounding the convention venues.

During the 2024 Republican convention in Milwaukee, the CNN-Politico Grill was located at Turner Hall, a building with a restaurant as well as ballroom and events space located adjacent to the main venue of the convention (the Fiserv Forum). CNN had originally intended to use the venue for a CNN Grill in its abandoned plans for the 2020 Democratic convention in the same city. For the 2024 convention, the venue was temporarily converted by CNN to house production workspace both itself and Politico. For invited visitors to congregate, CNN set-up a restaurant, a bar, an ice cream parlor, and a lounge. Venue decor and menu items were designed to reflect the convention host state of Wisconsin. CNN applied for a permit to install temporary neon signage, which the Milwaukee Historic Preservation Commission approved.

For the 2024 Democratic convention in Chicago, the CNN-Politico Grill was erected across the street from convention's main venue (the United Center). The menu featured offerings from many Chicago establishments, including Portillo's, Vienna Beef, Homer's Ice Cream (based in suburban Wilmette), Publican Quality Meats, Garrett Popcorn, Jays Potato Chips.

== South by Southwest ==
CNN Express bus parked outside of the CNN Grill at Max's Wine Dive in 2011

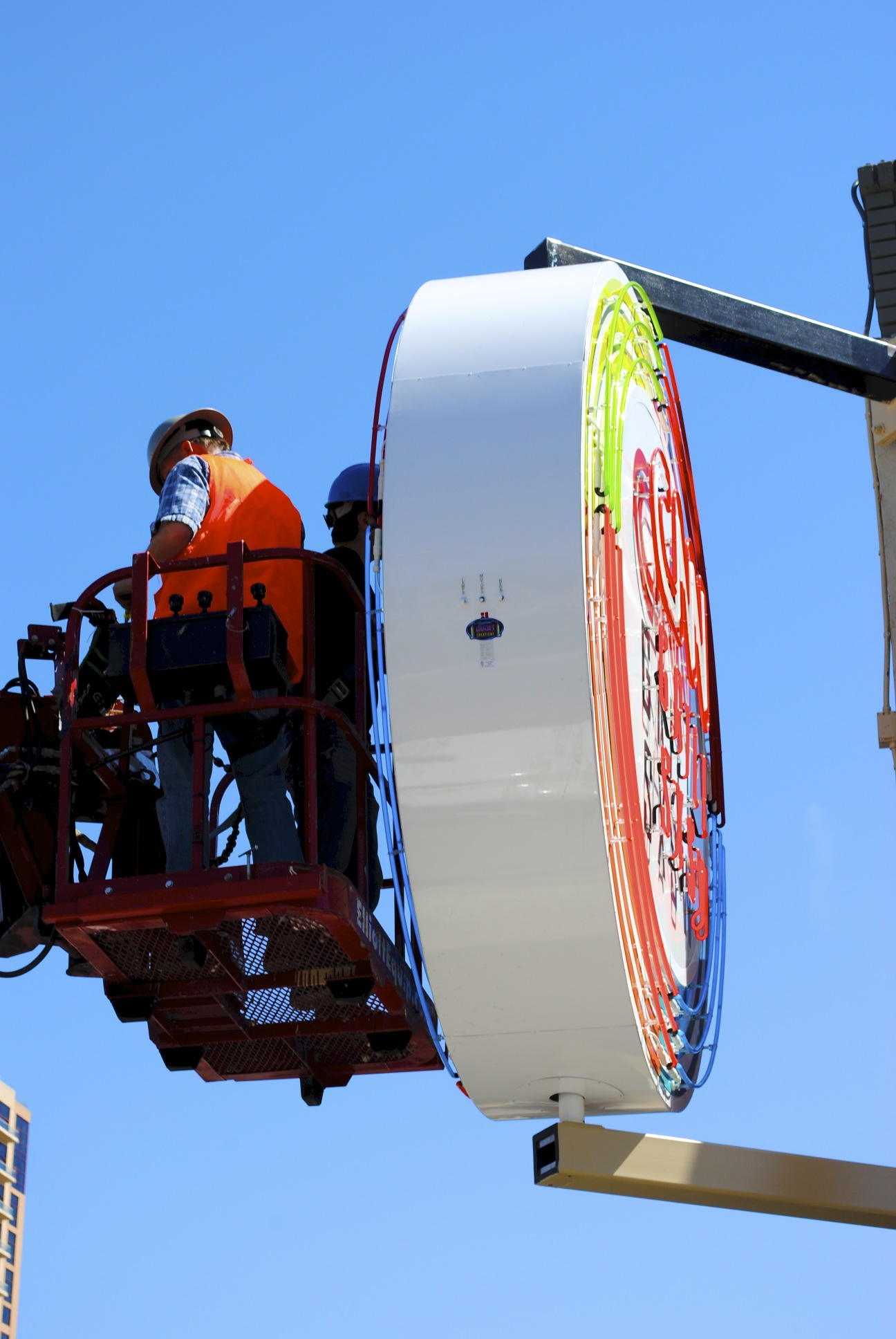
Rotating neon sign being installed on venue ahead of South by Southwest 2011

During the 2011 and 2012 iterations of South by Southwest (a festival and conference in Austin, Texas), CNN erected a CNN Grill at Max's Wine Dive, adjacent to the main venue (Austin Convention Center). To make-over the existing bar and turn it into a "CNN Grill", a large CNN-branded rotating neon sign out was installed at its entrance, television screens were added inside, and a CNN-branded bus was parked in front of the venue.

=== SBSW 2011 ===
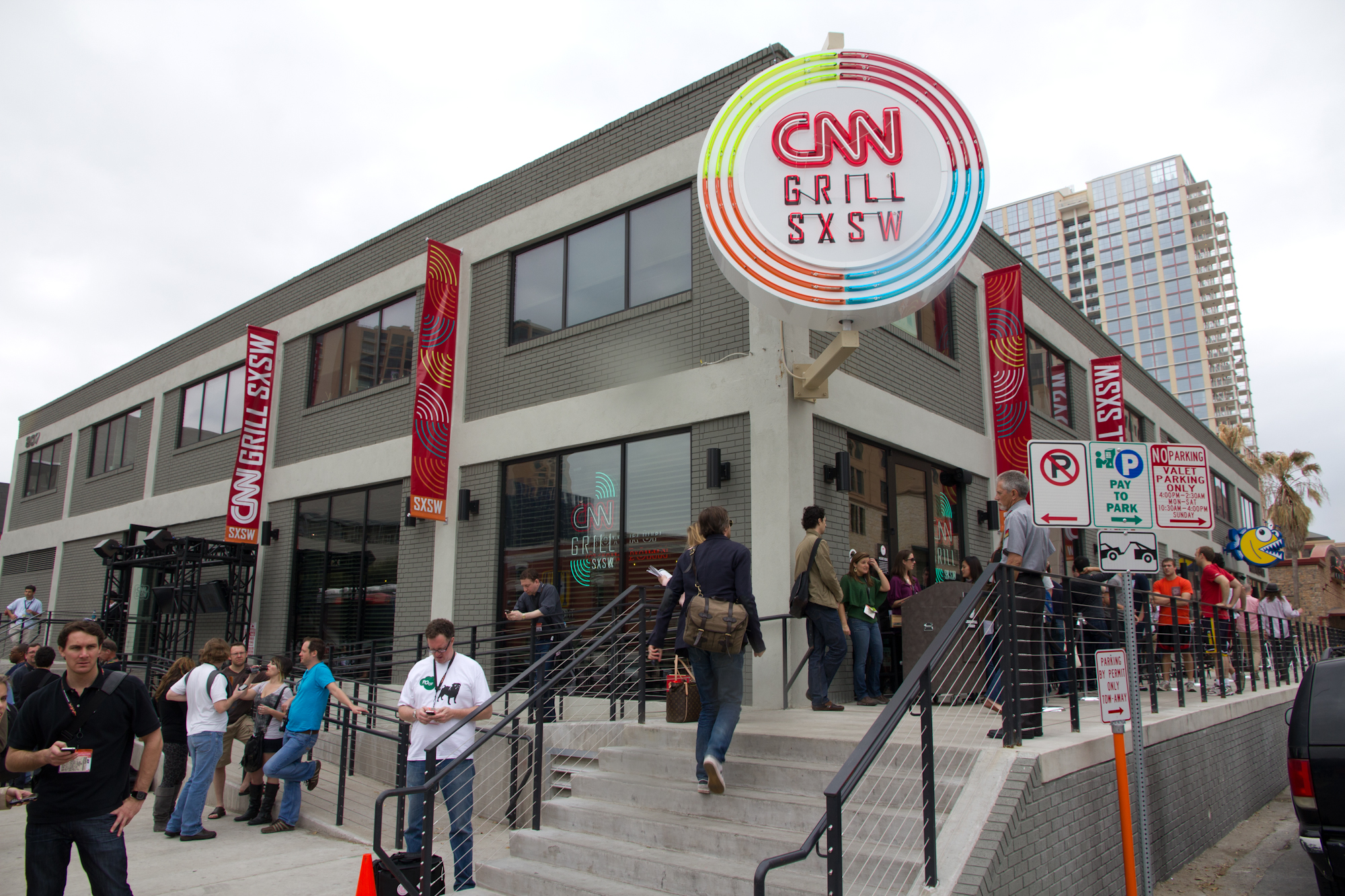
CNN Grill during South by Southwest in 2011

During the 2011 iteration of South by Southwest, CNN launched their TV Everywhere digital service. The network also partnered with Vimeo on a project to cover the conference through collaborative storytelling. In this partnership, five video creators and five "iReporters" collaborated to create video diaries of each day of the conference. The CNN Grill was used for the partnership as a video editing space. The grill was also used as a broadcast studio and filming location for interviews that were live-streamed on CNN.com and CNN Apps. For the convention, CNN scheduled a lineup of interviews with Aneesh Chopra, Philippe Cousteau, Ellen Page (Elliot Page), Rainn Wilson. The space also hosted the CNN-broadcast panel "Beyond Facebook: The Future of Alternative Social Networks", moderated by Pete Cashmore (Mashable founder and CEO). The space also hosted live musical performances, with CNN booking a lineup of acts that included Augustana, The Back Pockets, The Bridges, Brett Dennen, The Civil Wars, Death on Two Wheels, Kevin Devine, Family of the Year, Gold Motel, Granville Automatic, Lauren St. Jane, Stephen Kellogg, Locksley, Lovett, J. Roddy Walston & The Business, Miguel, Miniature Tigers, Ponderosa, and Tyler Lyle.

=== SBSW 2012 ===
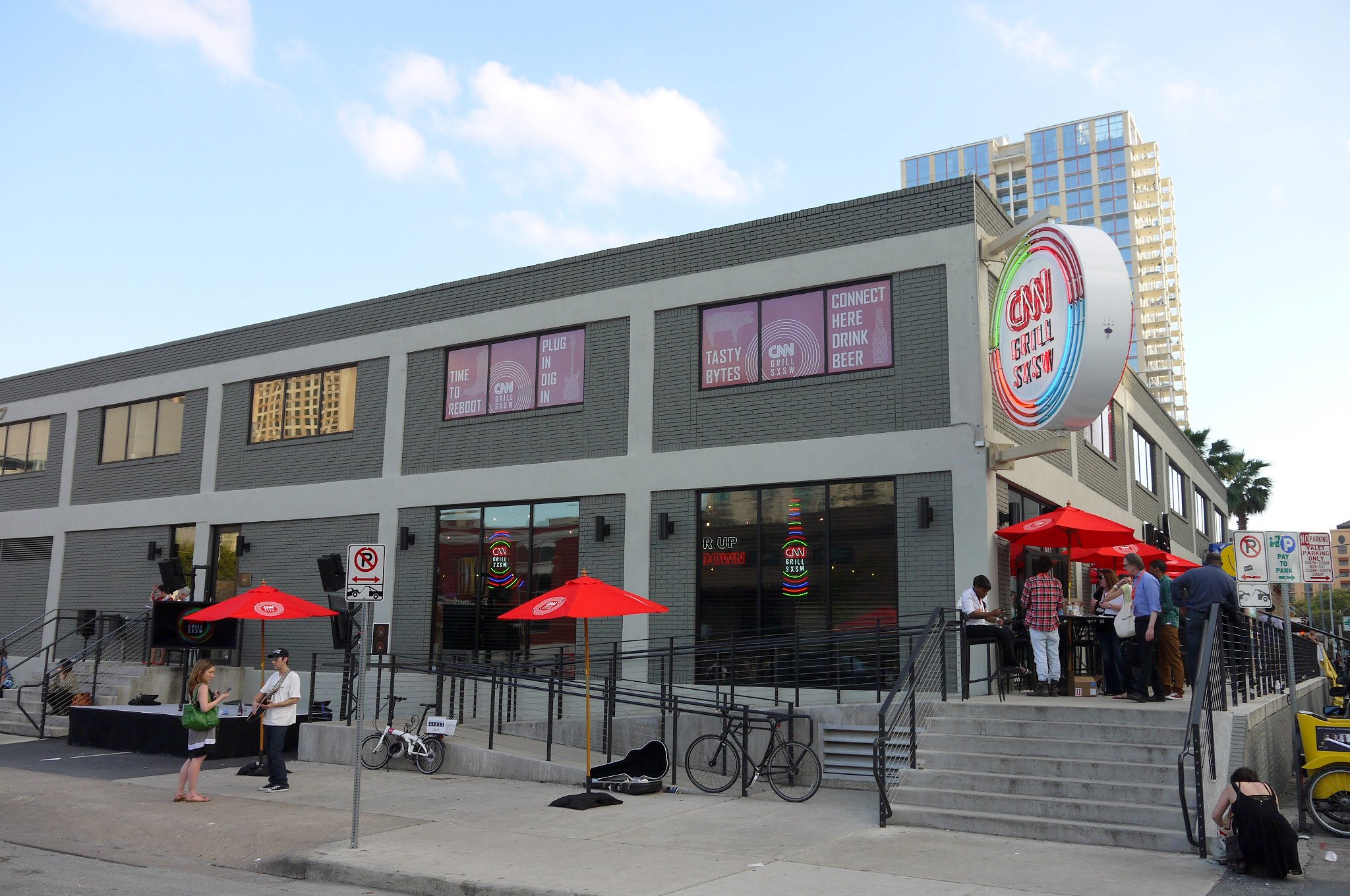
CNN Grill during South by Southwest in 2012

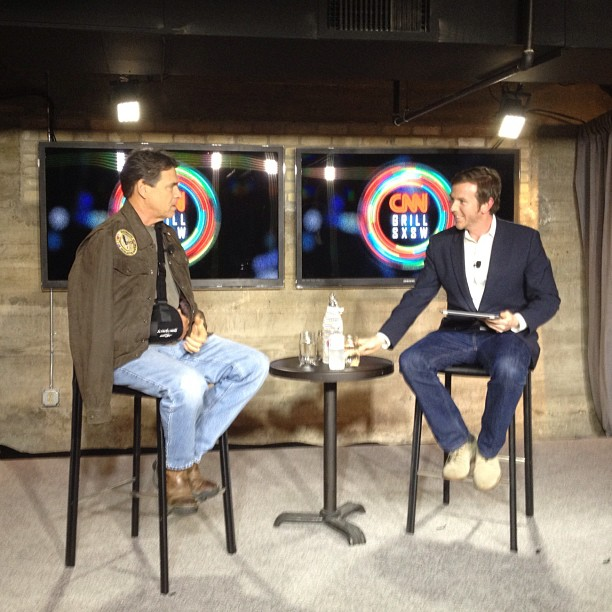
Texas Gov. Rick Perry (left) being interviewed by Peter Hamby at the CNN Grill in 2011

In 2012, CNN Grill returned to South by Southwest, again occupying Max's Wine Dive. Danny Meyer's Union Square Events created the menu served at the CNN Grill.

CNN arranged a lineup of live musical performances at the CNN Grill, including Blackberry Smoke, Austin Brown; Cherub; Hellogoodbye; Quiet Hounds; Gemma Ray; The Rocket Boys; and Zeale.

Panel discussions were hosted at the CNN Grill, including an interview of Texas Governor Rick Perry by journalist Peter Hamby.
