= Turner Hall (Milwaukee) =

- U.S. National Register of Historic Places
- U.S. National Historic Landmark
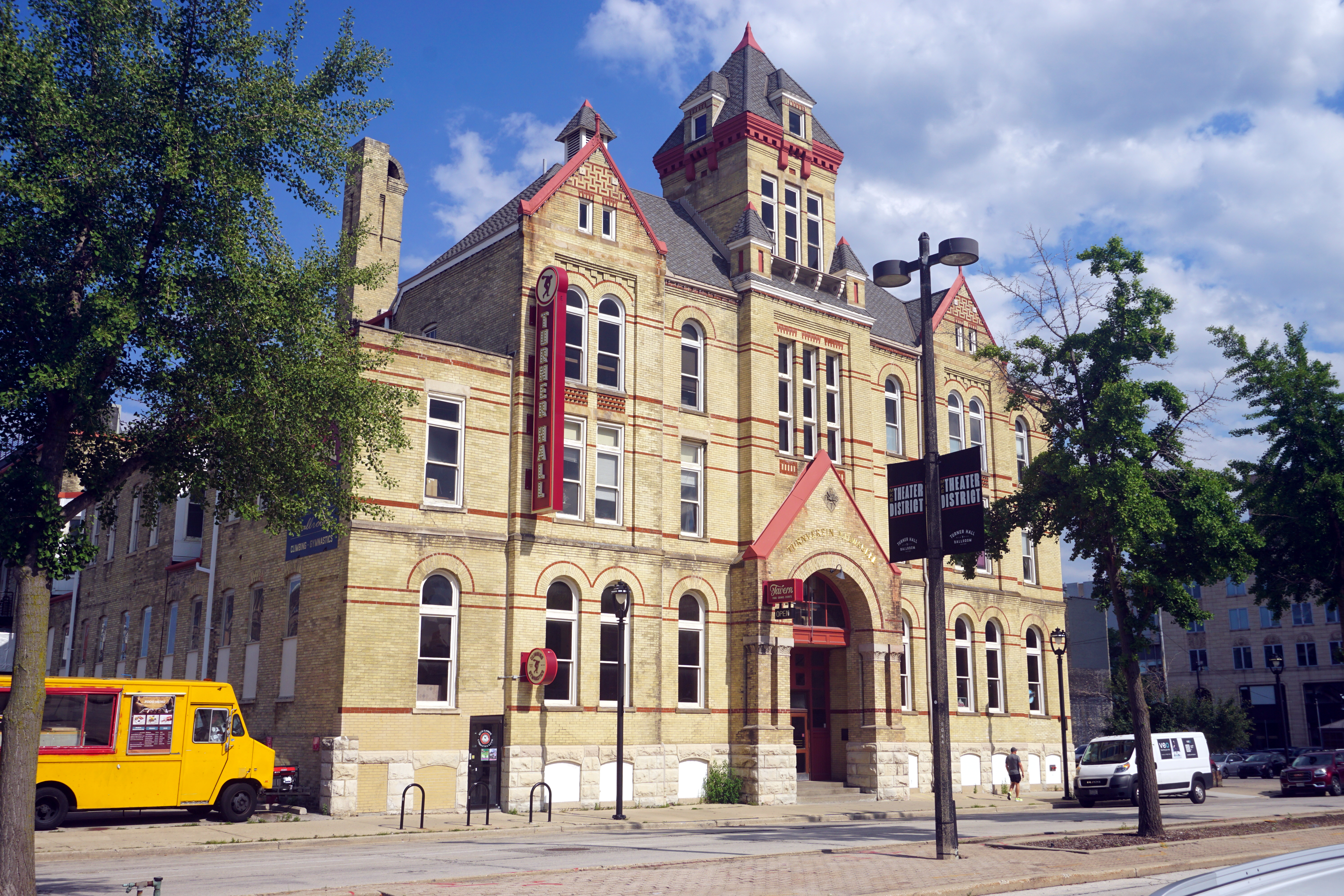

- Location within Wisconsin Location within the United States
- Location: 1034 N. 4th St., Milwaukee, Wisconsin
- Coordinates: 43°2′37″N 87°54′56″W
- Built: 1882
- Architect: Henry C. Koch
- Architectural style: Romanesque Revival, Rundbogenstil
- NRHP reference No.: 77000041

Significant dates
- Added to NRHP: November 7, 1977
- Designated NHL: November 15, 1996

Turner Hall is a historic athletic club facility at 1034 North 4th Street in Milwaukee, Wisconsin. Named using the German "Turnen", meaning gymnastics or physical fitness, it is significant for its association with the American Turners, a German-American athletic, cultural, and political association. The Milwaukee group was founded in 1853 under the title, "Socialist Turnverein"; its leaders included Socialist Congressman Victor Berger. The building is one of the largest and most distinctive surviving buildings associated with the Turner movement, and was designated a National Historic Landmark in 1996. It is now used as a performance and meeting venue.

== Description and history ==
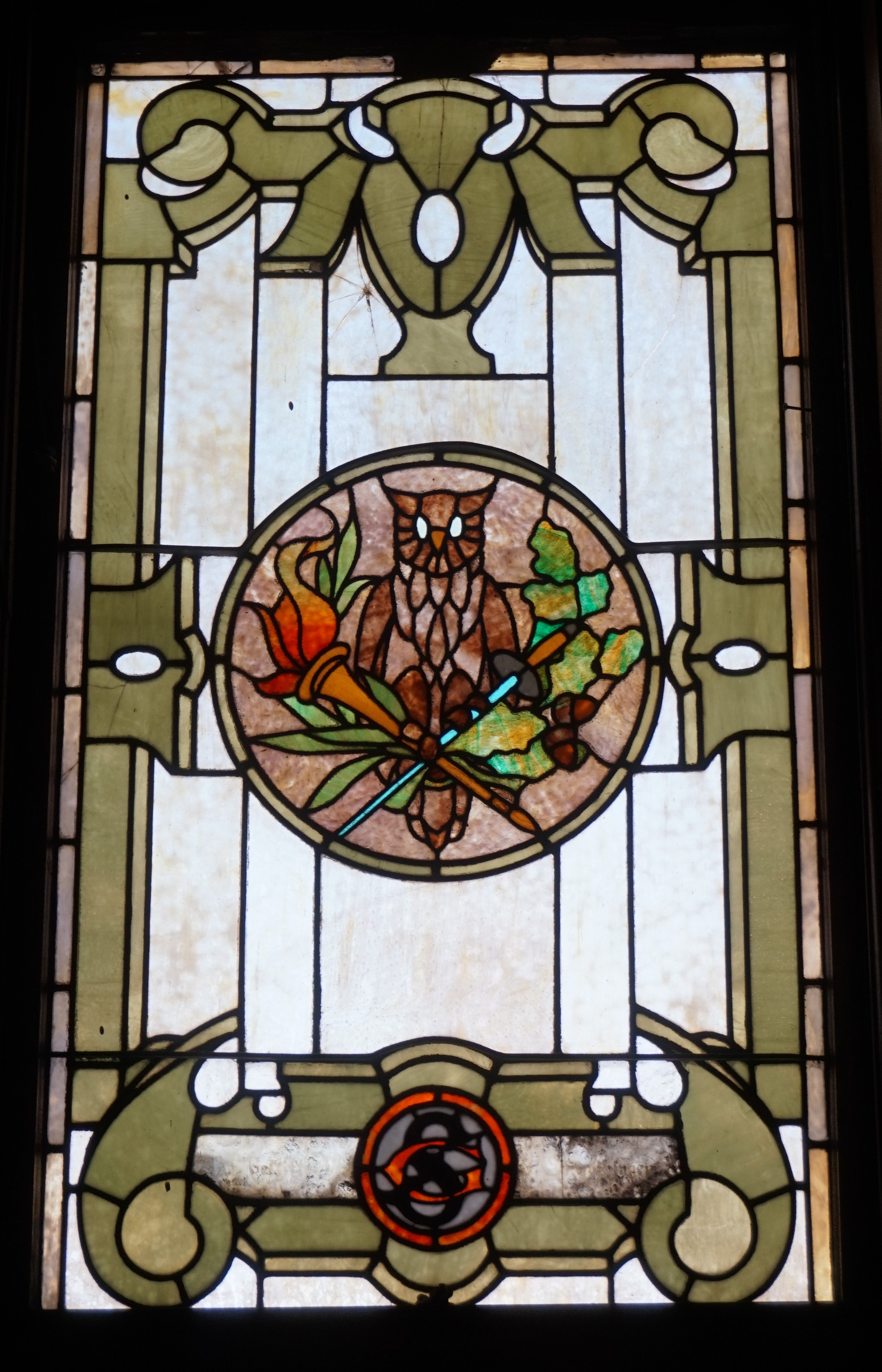
Stained-glass window in Turner Hall featuring an owl, the symbol of Milwaukee Turners

The Turner movement was founded in Germany in 1811 by Friedrich Ludwig Jahn as a gymnastic association called Turnverein, encouraging harmonious development of mind and body - to some extent a reaction to French domination during the Napoleonic Wars. After the failed revolutions of 1848, German political and economic refugees came to America, and some brought Turner ideas with them. A society was organized in Milwaukee in 1853, called the Sozializer Turnveirein Milwaukee, then renamed Turnverein Milwaukee. Their creed was "Free speech, free press, free assembly for discussion of all questions so that men and women may think unfettered and order their lives by the dictates of conscience."

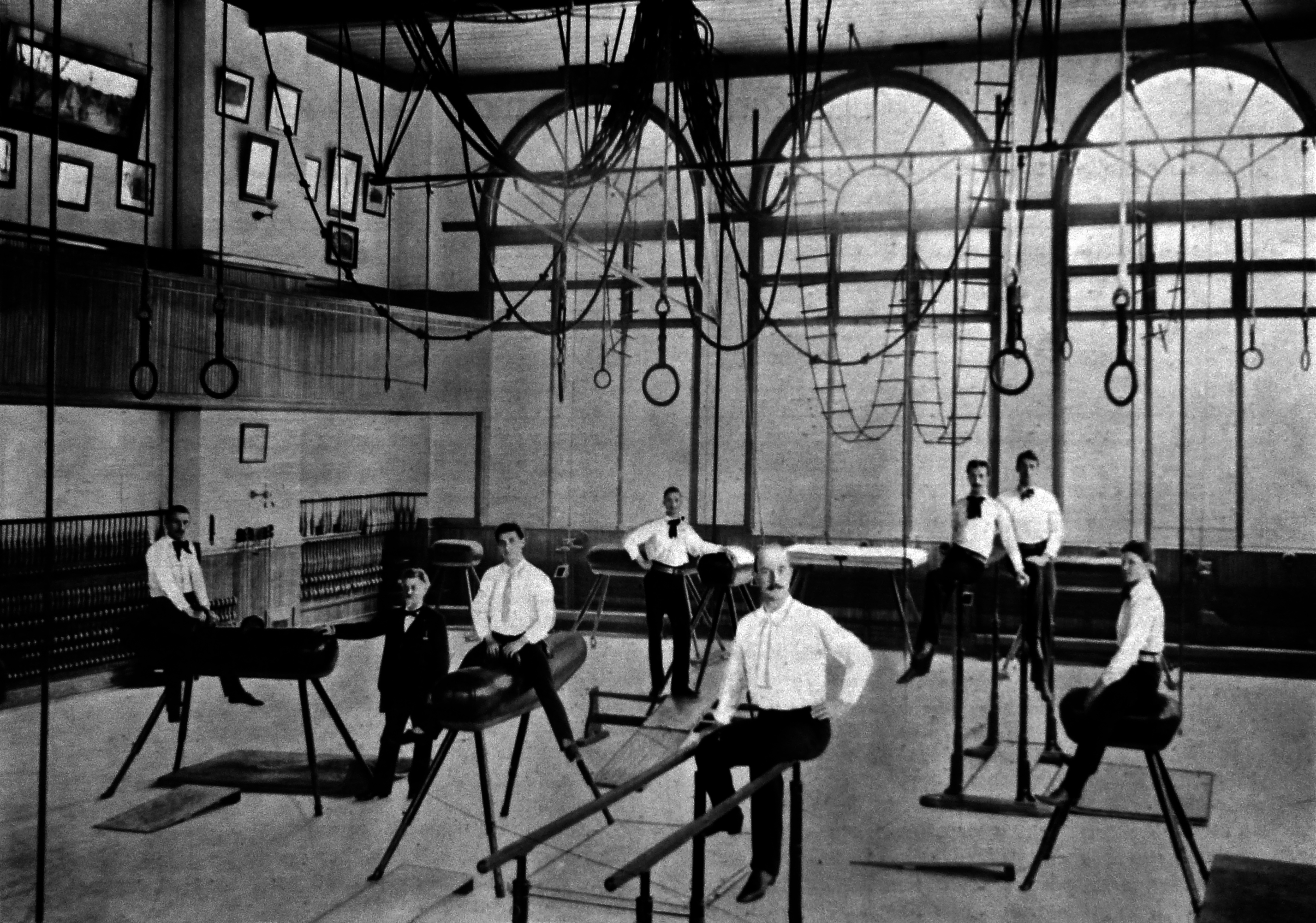
Gymnastics room in the National Gymnastics Hall at Milwaukee, ca. 1900

The Turner Society in Milwaukee grew and by the 1880s they needed a new meeting hall. The building was designed by architect Henry C. Koch, and was completed in 1882, with an addition in 1899. In keeping with the Turner movement's philosophy, the interior is decorated with artwork, including rare murals by German immigrant artists. Stained glass windows are adorned with political slogans relating to the Turner's progressive political stances.

Turner Hall stands in Milwaukee's Westown downtown area, on the east side of North 4th Street between West Highland Avenue and West State Street. It is a four-story masonry building, built out of brick in a High Victorian style. Its front facade is elaborate, with projecting gabled sections near the outer corners, and a central entrance set deeply recessed under another projection. The central section rises to a five-story pyramid-capped tower. The interior includes a ballroom with balcony level, restaurant and beer hall and meeting rooms. A gymnasium with modernized facilities is located in the building basement.

In 1994 the Governor proclaimed Turner Hall one of the "Ten Most Endangered Historic Sites" in Wisconsin. It was declared a National Historic Landmark in 1996. In 2000, The Milwaukee Turners established the Turner Ballroom Preservation Trust to renovate and maintain the building. It now hosts a wide variety of concerts. The Turner Hall Ballroom was awarded the "Venue of the Year" at the 2010 Wisconsin Area Music Industry (WAMI) awards.

== See also ==
- WMWG-LP: Turner Hall radio station
- List of National Historic Landmarks in Wisconsin
- National Register of Historic Places listings in Milwaukee
- CNN Grill —housed at Turner Hall during the 2024 Republican National Convention
