= WMWG-LP =

Glendale, Wisconsin; United States
- Broadcast area: Milwaukee, Wisconsin
- Frequency: 89.3 MHz

Ownership
- Owner: Milwaukee Turners, Inc.

History
- First air date: March 1, 2017
- Last air date: July 18, 2024

Technical information
- Facility ID: 196258
- Class: L1
- ERP: 100 watts
- HAAT: 1.3 meters (4.3 ft)
- Transmitter coordinates: 43°7′12.5″N 87°55′11.8″W

WMWG-LP (89.3 FM) was a non-commercial low-power radio station licensed to Glendale, Wisconsin, serving the Greater Milwaukee area. The station was owned by the Milwaukee Turners organization (of Turner Hall fame).
