= Queen City Quarter =

Shopping mall in Charlotte, North Carolina, U.S.

- Location: Charlotte, North Carolina, U.S.
- Coordinates: 35.225°N 80.842°W
- Address: 210 E. Trade Street
- Opened: 2008
- Developer: The Ghazi Company
- Owner: CBRE Group
- Architect: DMR Architects
- Num. of stores: 15
- Floor area: 267,000 square feet (24,800 m^{2})
- Floors: 5
- Parking: 1,100 spaces of underground parking
- Public transit: Charlotte Transportation Center; Lynx Blue Line and CityLynx Gold Line
- Website: www.queencityquarter.com

Queen City Quarter (formerly known as the Epicentre) is a mixed-use development with an open-air shopping center, office, and hotels, located in Uptown Charlotte, North Carolina, United States. It was developed by The Ghazi Company. Queen City Quarter opened to the general public in 2008 at a cost of $220 million and covers three acres (1.2 ha).

== History ==
=== Planning ===
In 1995, the Charlotte Convention Center relocated a few blocks south of its former location. The original Charlotte Convention Center closed shortly after, and was placed for sale. The building was on the market until The Ghazi Company purchased the 3.25-acre (1.32 ha) site in 2004 for $14.5 million. The 1973 structure was imploded in mid-2005, and construction on the Epicentre began soon afterwards.

The location was central to a rapidly transforming area of Uptown Charlotte with the Charlotte Area Transit System constructing a Lynx Blue Line light rail station, a new Ritz-Carlton hotel, and the Spectrum Center being constructed on the next block. The project went through various design changes to include an Aloft hotel and a direct connection to the adjoining light rail station. The project was originally set to include a 52-story residential tower located atop the retail buildings to open in 2009.

The complex is connected via sybridge to the Overstreet Mall and the Omni Hotel Charlotte. The main entrance to EpiCentre is along College Street, where valets will be stationed to handle parking. The design was criticized by urban planners due to the façade of blank walls that faced the streets, auto-dependent design reminiscent of a suburban mall, and separation from the adjacent light rail stop and sidewalks. Contractors and lenders sued the developers and each other over building permits, condominium rights, and financial issues before the complex opened.

=== Opening ===
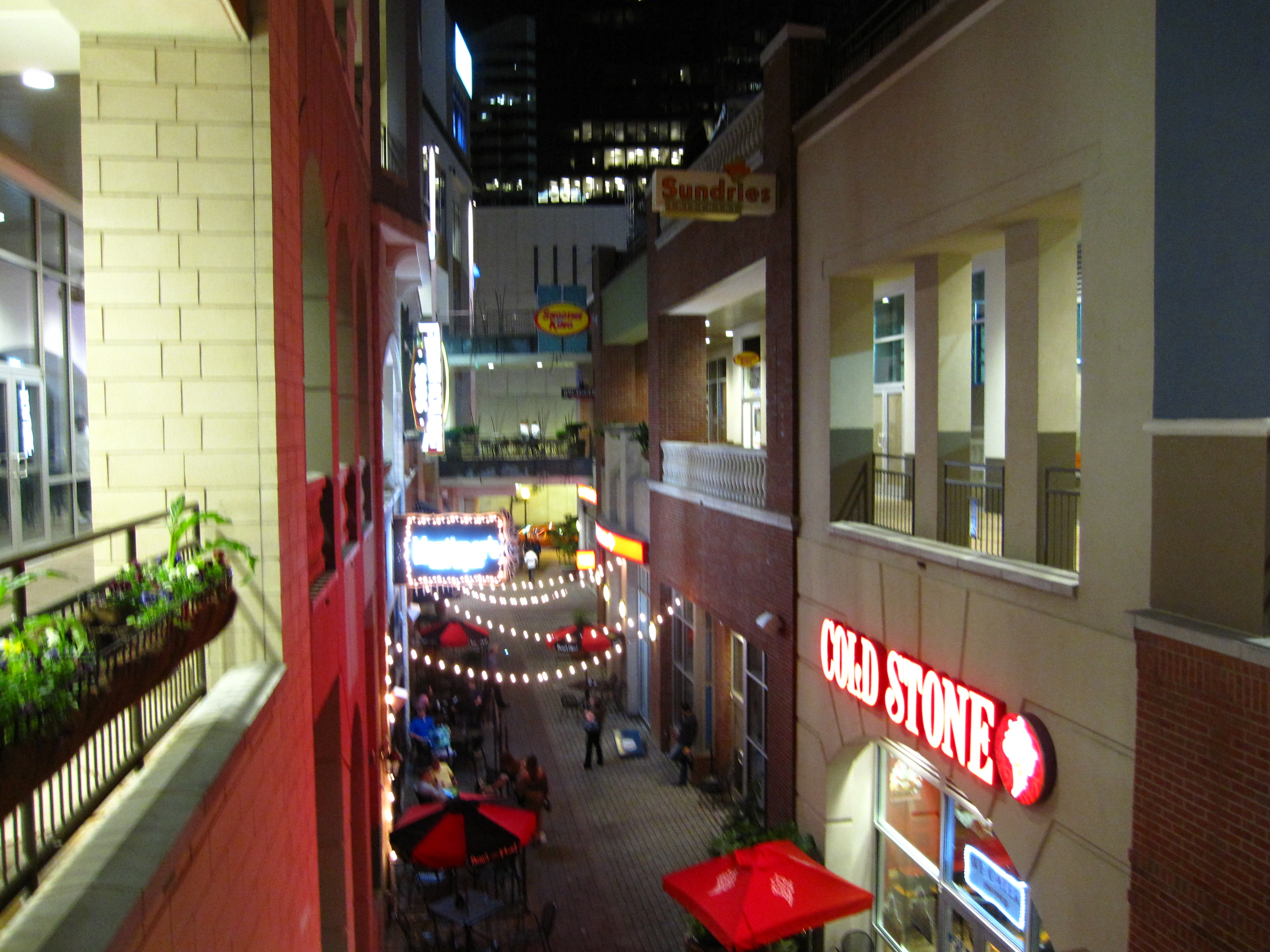
An alleyway at Queen City Quarter

The first phase of the Epicentre opened on March 13, 2008. Original tenants include Whiskey River, Smoothie King, Five Guys, Bruegger's Bagels, The Fudgery, Cantina Laredo, Fleming's Prime Steakhouse & Wine Bar, Bella Vista Restaurant and Lounge, Flying Biscuit, Shane's Rib Shack, The Rooftop Terrace, Suite, BlackFinn Restaurant & Saloon, Howl at the Moon, Cold Stone Creamery, Studio Movie Grill, and PJ's Coffee and Wine Bar. The venue also includes a bowling alley and a 175-room Aloft hotel above a portion of one of the retail buildings. For many years, the Epicentre remained a destination for nightlife in Uptown Charlotte, introducing a collection of tenants not previously offered within the city.

By 2010, the foundation for the planned residential tower was completed atop the retail building, however construction on the tower itself was halted and later stalled amid the Great Recession. The same year, the complex, facing foreclosure, declared bankruptcy. Ghazi and his partners gave up ownership in 2012 as part of a settlement with the new owners.

==== 2012 Democratic National Convention ====
The Epicentre was used as a media hub during the 2012 Democratic National Convention. Several spaces were utilized, including The CNN Grill in a former Mexican cantina space. Bloomberg Link in the former Gold's Gym, C-SPAN, an exhibit, and MSNBC, which constructed a set in the central courtyard of the EpiCentre, and has signage inside and outside of the entire venue. The network also took over a restaurant and converted into an “MSNBC fan experience”.

==== Continued success ====
Following the Democratic National Convention, the Epicentre introduced new tenants and remained successful for the following years. In 2014, CIM Group purchased the Epicentre for $131 million. In 2016, construction of the AC Hotel/Residence Inn Charlotte City Center began in the location of the planned residential tower. The venue hosted major events such as the Charlotte Hornets’ rebranding celebration that year and the Carolina Panthers’ Super Bowl pep rally in early 2016.

=== Decline ===
In March 2016, the legislature passed the controversial Public Facilities Privacy & Security Act, also known as House Bill 2; the "bathroom bill" effectively nullified Charlotte's LGBTQ nondiscrimination ordinance and other similar protections throughout North Carolina. In response, numerous events were canceled. That fall, Charlotte-Mecklenburg police shot and killed Keith Lamont Scott in the University City area, which led to massive uptown protests that coalesced at the Epicentre. Demonstrators smashed windows and caused other property damage, causing the Epicentre to temporarily close. News photos and footage of shattered glass, National Guard troops, and armored vehicles parked in front of the complex lowered foot traffic after the complex reopened.

In February 2019, the complex turned into a temporary fan venue for the 2019 NBA All-Star Game. In April 2019, a security manager was stabbed at the Suite nightclub located in the complex. The same day, an argument began inside of a restaurant at the Epicentre and continued out onto the street in front of the complex, where a man was shot. In October 2019, a fight at the Epicentre, which produced a stray bullet, struck and killed Maryland resident John Holaday, the 74-year-old CEO of a drug-disposal company visiting the city. Following the media coverage of the death, among other crimes reported at the complex, businesses began relocating from the complex.

==== Closure of businesses ====
The state of North Carolina required bars and nightclubs to remain closed throughout the COVID-19 pandemic, resulting in low foot traffic throughout the complex. By October 2020, several businesses operating at the Epicentre were evicted or closed, including Wild Wing Cafe, Whiskey River, Urban Bricks Pizza Bar, Smoothie King, Firehouse Subs, Tin Roof & The Green Room, Papa Rossi's, Tin Roof, Studio Movie Grill, Howl at the Moon, Grabbagreen, and Jason's Deli. The entire third floor of the complex was closed to visitors. The complex was in need of renovation as the building conditions began deteriorating and walkable pathways were becoming broken. By the end of 2019, the Epicentre was 78% leased.

In August 2021, the complex defaulted on its $85 million loan and was 70% vacant. In March 2022, the property began foreclosure.

=== Revitalization ===
In September 2022, CBRE, the owners of the complex, announced its name would be changed to Queen City Quarter. Additionally, it was announced that repairs would be made, including maintenance to the courtyard, parking garage, patios, and roof expected to be completed by the end of the year. Developers also detail in the announcement that all public staircases and escalators will be renovated, along with new landscaping, lighting, and benches.
